= Monoamine releasing agent =

Class of compounds

Amphetamine, the prototypical monoamine releasing agent, which induces the release of dopamine and norepinephrine.

A monoamine releasing agent (MRA), or simply monoamine releaser, is a drug that induces the release of one or more monoamine neurotransmitters from the presynaptic neuron into the synapse, leading to an increase in the extracellular concentrations of the neurotransmitters and hence enhanced signaling by those neurotransmitters. The monoamine neurotransmitters include serotonin, norepinephrine, and dopamine; MRAs can induce the release of one or more of these neurotransmitters.

MRAs work by reversing the direction of the monoamine transporters (MATs), including the serotonin transporter (SERT), norepinephrine transporter (NET), and/or dopamine transporter (DAT), causing them to promote efflux of non-vesicular cytoplasmic monoamine neurotransmitter rather than reuptake of synaptic monoamine neurotransmitter. Many, but not all MRAs, also reverse the direction of the vesicular monoamine transporter 2 (VMAT2), thereby additionally resulting in efflux of vesicular monoamine neurotransmitter into the cytoplasm.

A variety of different classes of drugs induce their effects in the body and/or brain via the release of monoamine neurotransmitters. These include psychostimulants and appetite suppressants acting as dopamine and norepinephrine releasers like amphetamine, methamphetamine, and phentermine; sympathomimetic agents acting as norepinephrine releasers like ephedrine and pseudoephedrine; non-stimulant appetite suppressants acting as serotonin releasers like fenfluramine and chlorphentermine; and entactogens acting as releasers of serotonin and/or other monoamines like MDMA. Trace amines like phenethylamine and tryptamine, as well as the monoamine neurotransmitters themselves, are endogenous MRAs. It is thought that monoamine release by endogenous mediators may play some physiological regulatory role.

MRAs must be distinguished from monoamine reuptake inhibitors (MRIs) and monoaminergic activity enhancers (MAEs), which similarly increase synaptic monoamine neurotransmitter levels and enhance monoaminergic signaling but work via distinct mechanisms.

== Types and selectivity ==
MRAs can be classified by the monoamines they mainly release, although these drugs lie on a spectrum:

- Selective for one neurotransmitter
  - Norepinephrine releasing agent (NRA) (e.g., ephedrine, levomethamphetamine)
  - Dopamine releasing agent (DRA) (no robustly selective agents known)
  - Serotonin releasing agent (SRA) (e.g., chlorphentermine, MMAI)
- Non-selective, releasing two or more neurotransmitters
  - Norepinephrine–dopamine releasing agent (NDRA) (e.g., amphetamine, methamphetamine)
  - Serotonin–norepinephrine releasing agent (SNRA) (e.g., fenfluramine, MDAI)
  - Serotonin–dopamine releasing agent (SDRA) (e.g., 5-chloro-αMT, BK-NM-AMT)
  - Serotonin–norepinephrine–dopamine releasing agent (SNDRA) (e.g., MDMA, mephedrone)

The differences in selectivity of MRAs is the result of different affinities as substrates for the monoamine transporters, and thus differing ability to gain access into monoaminergic neurons and induce monoamine neurotransmitter release.

As of present, no selective DRAs are known. This is because it has proven extremely difficult to separate DAT affinity from NET affinity and retain releasing efficacy at the same time. Several selective SDRAs, including tryptamine, (+)-α-ethyltryptamine (αET), 5-chloro-αMT, and 5-fluoro-αET, are known. However, besides their serotonin release, many of these compounds additionally act as non-selective serotonin receptor agonists, including of the serotonin 5-HT_{2A} receptor (with accompanying hallucinogenic effects), and some of them are known to act as monoamine oxidase inhibitors.

== Effects and uses ==
MRAs can produce varying effects depending on their selectivity for inducing the release of different monoamine neurotransmitters.

Selective SRAs such as chlorphentermine have been described as dysphoric and lethargic. Less selective SRAs that also stimulate the release of dopamine, such as methylenedioxymethamphetamine (MDMA), are described as more pleasant, more reliably elevating mood and increasing energy and sociability. SRAs have been used as appetite suppressants and as entactogens. They have also been proposed for use as more effective antidepressants and anxiolytics than selective serotonin reuptake inhibitors (SSRIs) because they can produce much larger increases in serotonin levels in comparison.

DRAs, usually non-selective for both norepinephrine and dopamine, have psychostimulant effects, causing an increase in energy, motivation, elevated mood, and euphoria. Other variables can significantly affect the subjective effects, such as infusion rate (increasing positive effects of DRAs) and psychological expectancy effects. They are used in the treatment of attention deficit hyperactivity disorder (ADHD), as appetite suppressants, wakefulness-promoting agents, to improve motivation, and are drugs of recreational use and misuse.

Selective NRAs are minimally psychoactive, but as demonstrated by ephedrine, may be distinguished from placebo, and may trends towards liking. They may also be performance-enhancing, in contrast to reboxetine which is solely a norepinephrine reuptake inhibitor. In addition to their central effects, NRAs produce peripheral sympathomimetic effects like increased heart rate, blood pressure, and force of heart contractions. They are used as nasal decongestants and bronchodilators, but have also seen use as wakefulness-promoting agents, appetite suppressants, and antihypotensive agents. They have additionally seen use as performance-enhancing drugs, for instance in sports.

== Mechanism of action ==
=== Mechanisms of monoamine release by MRAs ===
MRAs induce the release of the monoamine neurotransmitters serotonin, norepinephrine, and/or dopamine from monoaminergic neurons in the brain and/or periphery. MRAs are substrates of the plasma membrane-associated monoamine transporters (MATs), including of the serotonin transporter (SERT), norepinephrine transporter (NET), and/or dopamine transporter (DAT), and enter presynaptic monoaminergic neurons via these transporters. To a much lesser extent, sufficiently lipophilic MRAs may also passively diffuse into monoaminergic neurons. Once in the intracellular space of the neuron, MRAs reverse the direction of the MATs, as well as of the organic cation transporter 3 (OCT3), such that they mediate efflux of cytosolic monoamine neurotransmitters into the extracellular synaptic cleft rather than the usual reuptake. Many, though notably not all MRAs, (Note: MRAs that are inactive at VMAT2 include phentermine, phenmetrazine, and benzylpiperazine (BZP). Others, including cathinones like mephedrone, methcathinone, and methylone, also show only weak VMAT2 activity (e.g., ~10-fold weaker than the corresponding amphetamines).) additionally act at the vesicular monoamine transporter 2 (VMAT2) on synaptic vesicles to enhance the pool of cytosolic monoamine neurotransmitters available for efflux. However, MRAs can still induce monoamine release without VMAT2, for instance by releasing newly synthesized cytosolic neurotransmitters. In addition to their induction of monoamine release, MRAs act less potently as monoamine reuptake inhibitors (MRIs). This is due to substrate competition with monoamine neurotransmitters for the MATs and/or induction of MAT internalization and consequent inactivation. The monoamine neurotransmitters released by MRAs bind to and activate monoamine receptors on presynaptic and postsynaptic neurons to facilitate monoaminergic neurotransmission. As such, MRAs can be described as indirect monoamine receptor agonists.

The mechanisms by which MRAs induce MAT reverse transport and efflux are complex and incompletely understood. The process appears to depend on a number of intracellular changes, including sodium ion (Na^{+}) and calcium ion (Ca^{2+}) elevation, protein kinase C (PKC) activation, and Ca^{2+}/calmodulin-dependent protein kinase II alpha (CaMKIIα) activation, among others. Activation of protein kinases including PKC, CaMKIIα, and others results in phosphorylation of the MATs causing them to mediate efflux instead of reuptake. Exactly how MRAs induce the preceding effects is unclear however. A more recent study suggests that intracellular Ca^{2+} elevation, PKC activation, and CaMKIIα might all be dispensable for MRA-induced monoamine release, but more research is needed.

The trace amine-associated receptor 1 (TAAR1) is a receptor for trace amines like β-phenethylamine and tryptamine, as well as for monoamine neurotransmitters like dopamine and serotonin, and is a known target of many MRAs, such as amphetamine and methamphetamine. The TAAR1 is a largely intracellular receptor expressed both in presynaptic and postsynaptic monoaminergic neurons and appears to be extensively co-localized with MATs in the brain. Some in-vitro studies have found that TAAR1 agonism by MAT substrates like MRAs can produce PKC activation and thereby induce MAT reverse transport and monoamine efflux. As such, TAAR1 agonism, coupled with MAT substrate activity, could mediate or contribute to the monoamine release of MRAs. However, findings in this area are conflicting, with other studies unable to replicate the results. In addition, MRAs can still induce monoamine efflux in the absence of TAAR1 in vitro, well-known MRAs like amphetamine and methamphetamine exhibit only low-potency human TAAR1 agonism that is of uncertain general significance in humans, many other MRAs are inactive as TAAR1 agonists in humans, (Note: MRAs that are inactive at the human TAAR1 include most cathinones (e.g., methcathinone, mephedrone, flephedrone, and brephedrone), ephedrine, 4-methylamphetamine (4-MA), para-methoxyamphetamine (PMA), 4-methylthioamphetamine (4-MTA), MDMA MDEA, MBDB, 5-APDB, 5-MAPDB, 4-methylaminorex derivatives, meta-chlorophenylpiperazine (mCPP), TFMPP, and methylhexanamine (DMAA), among others.) the monoamine release and behavioral effects of amphetamines are not only preserved but substantially augmented in TAAR1 knockout mice, and the monoamine release and behavioral effects of amphetamines are strongly reduced or abolished in mice with TAAR1 overexpression. Besides induction of monoamine release, TAAR1 agonism, as well as other mechanisms, may mediate MAT internalization. MAT internalization may limit the capacity of MRAs to induce MAT reverse transport and monoamine efflux. TAAR1 signaling also activates G protein-coupled inwardly rectifying potassium channels (GIRKs) and thereby robustly inhibits the firing rates of brain monoaminergic neurons and suppresses exocytotic monoamine release. Due to the preceding mechanisms, potent TAAR1 agonism by MRAs that possess this action may actually auto-inhibit and constrain their monoaminergic effects.

Although induction of MAT reverse transport and consequent monoamine efflux is the leading theory of how MRAs act, an alternative and more recent theory has proposed that amphetamine, at therapeutic doses, may not actually act by inducing DAT reverse transport and dopamine efflux, but instead by augmenting exocytotic dopamine release and hence by enhancing phasic rather than tonic dopaminergic signaling. According to this model, DAT reverse transport may only be relevant at supratherapeutic doses and may be more associated with toxicity, for instance induction of psychosis. It is unclear how amphetamine might act to enhance exocytotic dopamine release, and more research is needed to evaluate this theory.

Aside from the mechanisms mediating the monoamine release of MRAs, other targets of some MRAs, such as the intracellular sigma σ_{1} receptor, have been found to inhibit MRA-induced monoamine efflux via interactions with the MATs. Conversely, activation of the sigma σ_{2} receptor has been found to potentiate amphetamine-induced dopamine efflux. The mechanism mediating this effect is unknown, but it has been postulated that it may be due to elevation of intracellular calcium and consequent downstream effects.

=== Differences from physiological release and reuptake inhibitors ===
The neurotransmitter release induced by MRAs is very different from normal exocytotic monoamine release, in which action potentials trigger synaptic vesicles to fuse with the cell membrane and release neurotransmitters into the synaptic cleft. In relation to this, MRAs promote tonic monoaminergic signaling, whereas normal exocytotic monoamine release involves phasic monoaminergic signaling.

The enhancement of monoaminergic signaling by MRAs also differs from that with MRIs. Because MRIs block monoamine neurotransmitter reuptake and consequent inactivation following action potentials and exocytotic release, they preferentially augment phasic monoaminergic signaling rather than tonic signaling. In addition, inhibitory presynaptic and somatodendritic monoamine autoreceptors, including serotonin 5-HT_{1A} and 5-HT_{1B} autoreceptors, dopamine D_{2} and D_{3} autoreceptors, and α_{2}-adrenergic autoreceptors, respond to elevated synaptic monoamine neurotransmitter levels by inhibiting presynaptic monoaminergic neuron firing rates, and this substantially limits the effects of MRIs. In contrast, MRAs do not depend on action potentials to induce monoamine release, and thus are able to largely bypass the negative feedback mediated by autoreceptors. Relatedly, MRAs can induce far greater maximal increases in monoamine neurotransmitter levels than MRIs. For instance, MRIs can achieve maximal elevations in brain monoamine levels of about 5- to 10-fold in animals, whereas MRAs can produce elevations of as much as 10- to 50-fold, with no clear ceiling limit. Since MRAs depend on uptake by the MATs to induce monoamine release, their mediation of monoamine release and consequent effects can be blocked by MRIs.

=== Structural requirements and partial MRAs ===
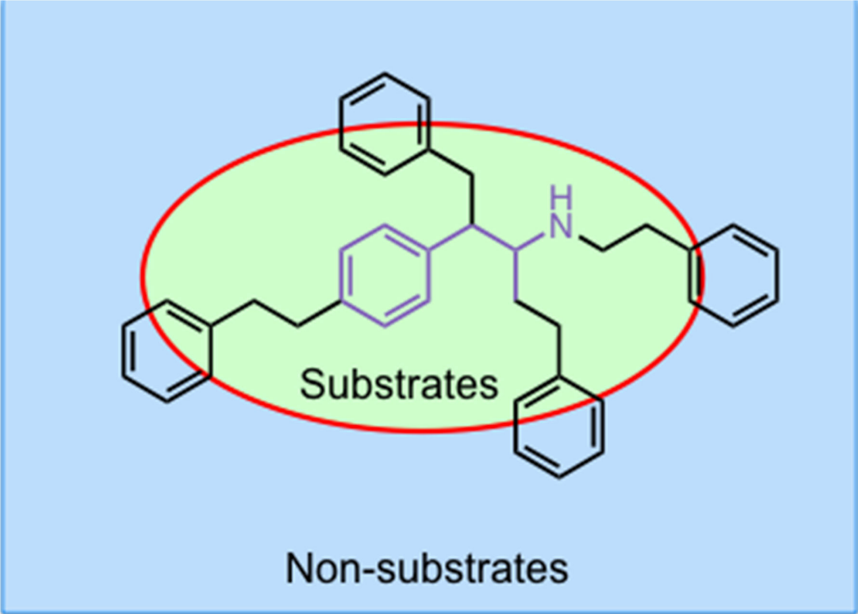
Generic pharmacophore for MRAs. Substitutions at the nitrogen, α-carbon, or phenyl ring extending beyond the red circle will result in partial releasers, transporter blockers, or be inactive.

There is a constrained and relatively small molecular size requirement for compounds to act as MRAs. This is because they must be small enough to serve as substrates of the monoamine transporters and thereby be transported inside of monoaminergic neurons by these proteins, in turn allowing them to induce monoamine neurotransmitter release. Compounds with chemical features extending beyond the size constraints for releasers will instead act as partial releasers, reuptake inhibitors, or be inactive. Partial releasers show reduced maximal efficacy in releasing monoamine neurotransmitters compared to conventional full releasers. While most MRAs are full releasers, a number of partial releasers are known and may have atypical properties. Examples of partial releasers include 3,4-methylenedioxyethylamphetamine (MDEA), N-ethylnaphthylaminopropane (ENAP), 3-trifluoromethyl-4-chlorophenylpiperazine (TFMCPP), para-nitrophenylpiperazine (pNPP), bretisilocin, and psilocin. The mechanisms responsible for the differences between full releasers and partial releasers are largely unknown.

=== Other related agents ===
==== DAT "inverse agonists" ====
Dopamine reuptake inhibitors (DRIs) have been grouped into two types, typical or conventional DRIs like cocaine, WIN-35428 (β-CFT), and methylphenidate that produce potent psychostimulant, euphoric, and reinforcing effects, and atypical DRIs like vanoxerine (GBR-12909), modafinil, benztropine, and bupropion, which do not produce such effects or have greatly reduced such effects. It has been proposed that typical DRIs may not actually be acting primarily as DRIs but rather as dopamine releasing agents (DRAs) via mechanisms distinct from conventional substrate-type DRAs like amphetamines. A variety of different pieces of evidence support this hypothesis and help to explain otherwise confusing findings. For example, typical DRIs like cocaine and methylphenidate can robustly increase brain dopamine levels similarly to substrate-type DRAs like amphetamine, whereas atypical DRIs, which are viewed as simple competitive reuptake inhibitors, achieve much more modest increases. Under this model, typical cocaine-like DRIs have been referred to with the new label of dopamine transporter (DAT) "inverse agonists" to distinguish them from conventional substrate-type DRAs. An alternative theory is that typical DRIs and atypical DRIs stabilize the DAT in different conformations, with typical DRIs resulting in an outward-facing open conformation that produces differing pharmacological effects from those of atypical DRIs.

==== Monoaminergic activity enhancers ====
Some MRAs, like the amphetamines amphetamine and methamphetamine, as well as trace amines like phenethylamine, tryptamine, and tyramine, are additionally monoaminergic activity enhancers (MAEs). That is, they enhance the action potential-mediated release of monoamine neurotransmitters (in contrast to MRAs, which induce uncontrolled monoamine release independent of neuronal firing). They are usually active as MAEs at much lower concentrations than those at which they induce monoamine release. The MAE actions of MAEs may be mediated by TAAR1 agonism, which has likewise been implicated in monoamine-releasing actions in some studies. MAEs without concomitant potent monoamine-releasing actions, like selegiline (L-deprenyl), phenylpropylaminopentane (PPAP), and benzofuranylpropylaminopentane (BPAP), have been developed.

== Endogenous MRAs ==
A number of endogenous compounds are known to act as MRAs. These include the monoamine neurotransmitters dopamine (an DRA), norepinephrine (an NRA), and serotonin (an SRA) themselves, as well as the trace amines phenethylamine (an NDRA), tryptamine (an SDRA or imbalanced SNDRA), and tyramine (an NDRA). Synthetic MRAs are substantially based on structural modification of these endogenous compounds, most prominently including the substituted phenethylamines and substituted tryptamines.

Release of monoamine neurotransmitters by themselves, for instance in the cases of serotonin, norepinephrine, and dopamine, has been referred to as "self-release". The physiological significance of the findings that monoamine neurotransmitters can act as releasing agents of themselves is unclear. However, it could imply that efflux is a common neurotransmitter regulatory mechanism that can be induced by any transporter substrate.

It is possible that monoamine neurotransmitter self-release could be a protective mechanism. It is notable in this regard that intracellular non-vesicular or cytoplasmic dopamine is toxic to neurons and that the vesicular monoamine transporter 2 (VMAT2) is neuroprotective by packaging this dopamine into synaptic vesicles. Along similar lines, MRAs induce the efflux of non-vesicular monoamine neurotransmitter and thereby move cytoplasmic neurotransmitter into the extracellular space. On the other hand, many MRAs but not all also act as VMAT2 inhibitors and reversers, and hence concomitantly induce the release of vesicular monoamine neurotransmitters like dopamine into the cytoplasm. Induction of VMAT2 efflux by MRAs appears to be related to their monoaminergic neurotoxicity.

== Monoaminergic neurotoxicity ==
Some MRAs have been found to act as monoaminergic neurotoxins and hence to produce long-lasting damage to monoaminergic neurons. Examples include dopaminergic neurotoxicity with methamphetamine and serotonergic neurotoxicity with methylenedioxymethamphetamine (MDMA). Sufficiently high doses of amphetamine can also produce dopaminergic neurotoxicity in some animals, including non-human primates. In contrast, reviews of magnetic resonance imaging (MRI) studies in humans with ADHD suggest that long-term treatment with therapeutic doses of amphetamine decreases abnormalities in brain structure and function.

Analogues of MDMA with retained MRA activity but reduced or no serotonergic neurotoxicity, like 5,6-methylenedioxy-2-aminoindane (MDAI) and 5-iodo-2-aminoindane (5-IAI), have been developed. Certain drugs have been found to block the neurotoxicity of MRAs in animals. For instance, the selective MAO-B inhibitor selegiline has been found to prevent the serotonergic neurotoxicity of MDMA in rodents.

== Chemical families ==
MRAs are usually arylalkylamines. A number of different structural families of compounds have been found to act as MRAs. The possible structural forms of MRAs are limited by a small molecular size requirement for activity. Molecules that are too large become monoamine reuptake inhibitors as they can no longer be transported into neurons by the monoamine transporters and induce monoamine release intracellularly.

=== Phenethylamine-like ===
- Phenethylamines (2-phenylethylamines) (e.g., phenethylamine, tyramine, dopamine, norepinephrine)
  - Amphetamines (α-methylphenethylamines) (e.g., amphetamine, methamphetamine, fenfluramine)
    - Cathinols (β-hydroxyamphetamines) (e.g., phenylpropanolamine, ephedrine, pseudoephedrine, cathine)
    - Cathinones (β-ketoamphetamines) (e.g., cathinone, methcathinone, mephedrone)
    - Phentermines (α-methylamphetamines) (e.g., phentermine, mephentermine, chlorphentermine, clortermine)
    - Phenylisobutylamines (α-ethylphenethylamines) (e.g., phenylisobutylamine, 4-CAB, 4-MAB, buphedrone)
    - Ring-extended amphetamines
      - Benzodioxolylaminopropanes (methylenedioxyamphetamines) (e.g., MDA, MDMA, MDEA, methylone)
        - Methylenedioxycathinones (e.g., methylone, ethylone, butylone)
        - Methylenedioxyphentermines (e.g., MDPH, MDMPH)
        - Benzodioxolylisobutylamines (e.g., BDB, MBDB, butylone)
      - Benzodioxanylaminopropanes (ethylenedioxyamphetamines) (e.g., EDA, EDMA, EDMC)
      - Benzofuranylaminopropanes (e.g., 4-APB, 5-APB, 5-MAPB, 6-APB, 6-MAPB, 5-APDB, 5-MAPDB, 6-APDB, 6-MAPDB, 7-APB, IBF5MAP)
        - Benzofuranylisobutylamines (e.g., 5-MBPB, 6-MBPB)
      - Benzothiophenylaminopropanes (e.g., 4-APBT, 5-APBT, 5-MAPBT, 6-APBT, 7-APBT)
      - Indolylaminopropanes (e.g., 5-IT/5-API, 6-IT/6-API)
      - Indanylaminopropanes (e.g., 5-APDI/IAP, 5-MAPDI)
      - Naphthylaminopropanes (e.g., NAP, methamnetamine/MNAP, ENAP, BMAPN)
      - Tetralinylaminopropanes (e.g., 6-APT/TAP)
      - Other ring-extended amphetamines (e.g., ODMA, SeDMA, TDMA)
- Cyclopentylaminopropanes (e.g., isocyclamine, cyclopentamine)
- Cyclohexylaminopropanes (e.g., norpropylhexedrine, propylhexedrine)
- Phenylpropylamines (e.g., phenylpropylamine, homo-MDA, homo-MDMA)
- Thiophenylisopropylamines (e.g., thiopropamine, methiopropamine, thiothinone)
- Phenylalkenylamines and phenylalkynylamines (e.g., phenylbutynamine, phenylbutenamine)
- Other possible groups (e.g., 2-furylethylamines, 2-tetrahydrofurylethylamines, 2-pyrrolylethylamines, 3-pyrrolylethylamines)

==== Amine fused into ring ====
- Phenylalkylpyrrolidines (e.g., α-PPP, 4-MePPP)
  - Methylenedioxyphenylalkylpyrrolidines (e.g., MDPPP)
- Phenylmorpholines (e.g., phenmetrazine, phendimetrazine)
  - Methylenedioxyphenylmorpholines (e.g., 3-MDPM)
  - Naphthylmorpholines (e.g., naphthylmorpholine, naphthylmetrazine)
- Phenyloxazolamines (e.g., aminorex, 4-methylaminorex, pemoline)
- Benzylpiperazines (e.g., 1-benzylpiperazine, MBZP)
  - Methylenedioxybenzylpiperazines (e.g., MDBZP, fipexide)
- Benzylpiperidines (e.g., 4-benzylpiperidine)
- Phenylpiperazines (e.g., 1-phenylpiperazine, mCPP, TFMPP, oMPP, pFPP, pMeOPP)

==== Alkyl chain fused into ring ====
- 2-Aminoindanes (e.g., 2-aminoindane (2-AI), NM-2-AI, MMAI, MEAI, ETAI, TAI, 5-IAI)
  - Methylenedioxyaminoindanes (e.g., MDAI, MDMAI)
  - Benzofurancyclopentanylamines (e.g., BFAI)
- 2-Aminotetralins (e.g., 2-aminotetralin, 6-CAT)
  - Methylenedioxyaminotetralins (e.g., MDAT, MDMAT)
- Other possible groups (e.g., benzylamines (e.g., MDM1EA), 2-amino-1,2-dihydronaphthalenes (e.g., 2-ADN), aminobenzocycloheptenes (e.g., 6-AB, 7-AB))

=== Tryptamine-like ===
- Tryptamines (2-(3-indolyl)ethylamines) (e.g., tryptamine, serotonin, bufotenin, DMT, psilocin, bretisilocin)
  - α-Alkyltryptamines (e.g., αMT (3-API), αET, 5-chloro-αMT, 5-fluoro-αMT)
    - β-Keto-α-alkyltryptamines (e.g., BK-NM-AMT, BK-5F-NM-AMT, BK-5Cl-NM-AMT, BK-5Br-NM-AMT)
- Isotryptamines (2-(1-indolyl)ethylamines) (e.g., isoAMT)
- Indolizinylaminopropanes (e.g., 1ZP2MA, 1Z2MAP1O)
- Benzothiophenylaminopropanes (e.g., 2-APBT, 3-APBT)
- Benzofuranylaminopropanes (e.g., 2-APB, 2-MAPB, 3-APB)
- Other possible groups (e.g., 2-pyrrolylethylamines, 3-pyrrolylethylamines)

=== Ring-less (alkylamines) ===
- Alkylamines (e.g., 1,3-DMBA, 1,4-DMAA, heptaminol, iproheptine, isometheptene, methylhexanamine/1,3-DMAA, octodrine, oenethyl, tuaminoheptane)

=== Chemical family structures gallery ===
Chemical family structure examples of monoamine releasing agents
Phenethylamine

Amphetamine

Phenylpropanolamine

Cathinone

Phentermine

Phenylisobutylamine

MDA

BDB

EDMA

5-APB

6-APB

5-APDB

6-APDB

IBF5MAP

5-MBPB

5-MAPBT

5-IT/5-API

6-IT/6-API

5-APDI/IAP

Naphthylaminopropane

6-APT/TAP

ODMA

SeDMA

TDMA

Cyclopentamine

Propylhexedrine

Thiopropamine

α-PPP

Phenmetrazine

Aminorex

1-Benzylpiperazine

4-Benzylpiperidine

1-Phenylpiperazine

2-Aminoindane

MDAI

2-Aminotetralin

MDAT

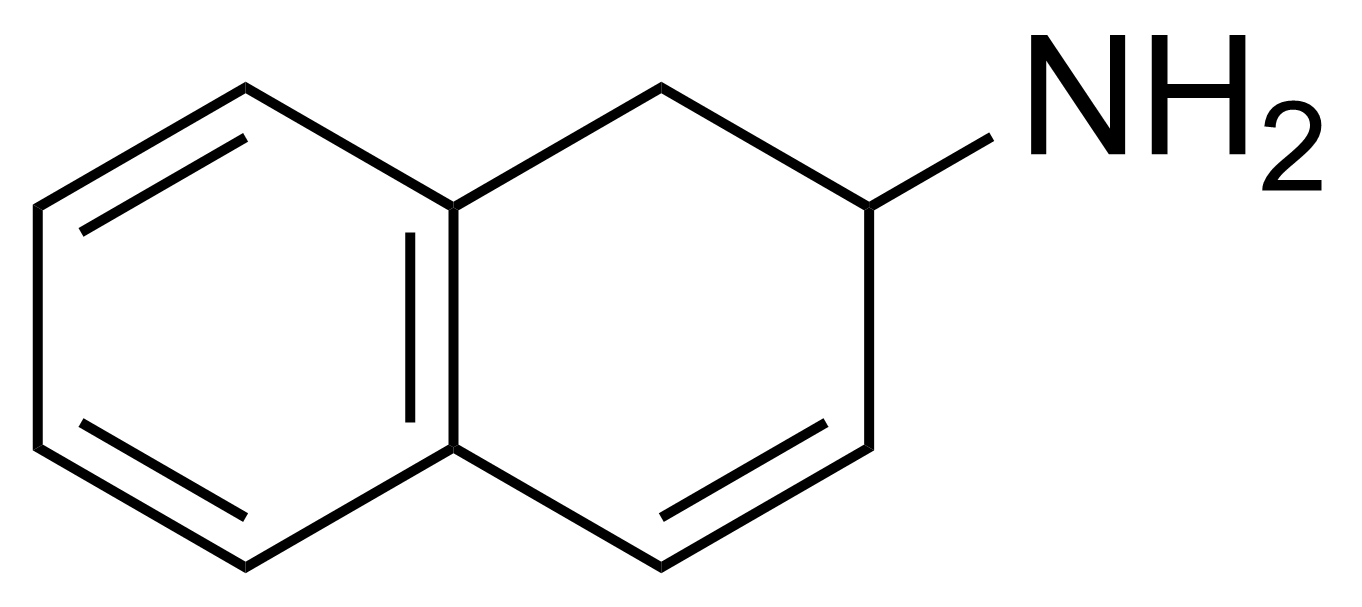
2-Amino-1,2-dihydronaphthalene

Tryptamine

α-Methyltryptamine

α-Ethyltryptamine

BK-NM-AMT

isoAMT

2-MAPB

1,3-Dimethylbutylamine

Heptaminol

Iproheptine

Isometheptene

Methylhexanamine

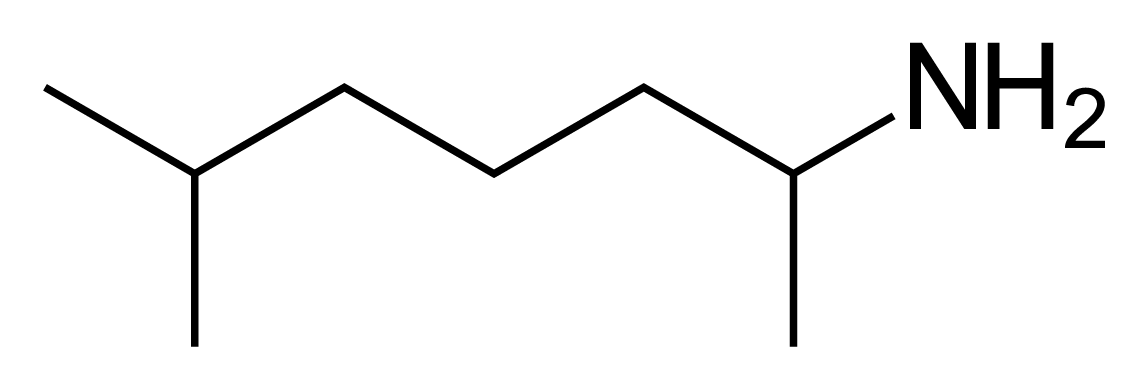
Octodrine

Oenethyl

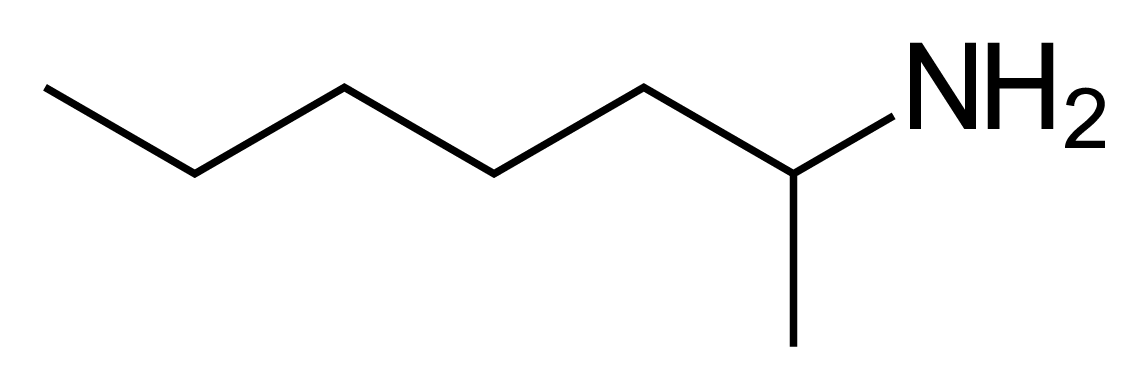
Tuaminoheptane

== Activity profiles ==
The activities of many MRAs in terms of their potencies, efficacies, and selectivities for monoamine release induction in vitro have been characterized in numerous studies in the scientific literature. These studies have been especially conducted by the research lab led by Richard B. Rothman and Michael H. Baumann at the National Institute on Drug Abuse (NIDA). These researchers developed an assay measuring monoamine release from rat brain synaptosomes in 1999 that has subsequently been widely employed. The data with this procedure from many relevant studies are provided in the table below. The Rothman and Baumann lab refers to these data as the "Phenyl Amine Library", "Phenethylamine Library", "Phenylethylamine Library", or "PAL" library, a large library of values of phenethylamine analogs at the monoamine transporters (1,400 compounds as of 2015), and has designated PAL-# code names for the drugs included in it.

Another method of measuring monoamine release involves the use of human HEK293 cells transfected with and expressing monoamine transporters. However, MRAs show differing and much lower potencies in this system compared to rat brain synaptosomes, and it is much less frequently employed. The reasons for these differences are not entirely clear, but may be related to species differences, differences in release assay methods, and/or absence of important neuronal membrane proteins in non-neuronal HEK293 cells.

Activity profiles of monoamine releasing agents in rat brain synaptosomes (EC_{50}, nM)
Compound	PAL #	5-HT	NE	DA	Type	Class	Ref
1-Methyl-T	PAL-637	53.1	>10000	>10000	SRA	Tryptamine	
1-Phenylpiperazine (PP)	ND	880	186	2530	SNRA	Phenylpiperazine	
1ZP2MA	ND	ND	ND	61.9	ND	Indolizinylethylamine	
2-Aminoindane (2-AI, AI)	ND	>10000	86	439	NDRA	2-Aminoindane	
2-APBT	ND	8.9	21.6	38.6	SNDRA	APBT	
2-BMC	ND	2837	156	650	NDRA	Cathinone	
2-CA	ND	ND	19.1	62.4	ND	Amphetamine	
2-CMC	ND	2815	93	179	NDRA	Cathinone	
2-FA	ND	ND	24.1	38.1	ND	Amphetamine	
2-FMA	ND	~15000	<100	~90	NDRA	Amphetamine	
2-FMC	ND	>10000	ND (85% at 10 μM)	48.7	NDRA	Cathinone	
2-FPM	ND	4808	28	112	NDRA	Phenylmorpholine	
2-MA	ND	ND	37	127	ND	Amphetamine	
2-MeO-A	ND	ND	473	1478	ND	Amphetamine	
2-MeO-MC	ND	7220	339	920	NDRA	Cathinone	
2-MMC	ND	347–490	53	81–97.9	SNDRA	Cathinone	
2-MPM	ND	1758	102	374	NDRA	Phenylmorpholine	
2-Phenylmorpholine	PAL-632	20260 (31% at 10 μM)	79 (96% at 10 μM)	86 (98% at 10 μM)	NDRA	Phenylmorpholine	
2-TFMeO-MC	ND	>10000	ND (33% at 10 μM)	>10000	IA	Cathinone	
2-TFMMC (2-TFMAP)	ND	8400–>10000	2200 (69% at 10 μM)	8000–>10000	SNDRA	Cathinone	
2C-C	ND	>100000	>100000	100000	IA	Phenethylamine	
2C-D	ND	IA	IA	IA	IA	Phenethylamine	
2C-E	ND	>100000	>100000	>100000	IA	Phenethylamine	
2C-I	ND	>100000	>100000	>100000	IA	Phenethylamine	
2C-T-2	ND	IA	IA	IA	IA	Phenethylamine	
3-APBT	ND	21.9	13.4	21.7	SNDRA	APBT	
3-BCPC	PAL-586	621	ND	IA (RI)	ND	Cathinone	
3-BMC	ND	136–137	25	21–28.0	SNDRA	Cathinone	
3-CA	PAL-304	120	9.4	11.8	SNDRA	Amphetamine	
3-CC	ND	567	105	64	SNDRA	Cathinone	
3-CCPC (RTI-6037-39)	PAL-433	1328	ND	IA (RI)	ND	Cathinone	
(–)-3-CCPC	PAL-1122	562	ND	IA (RI)	ND	Cathinone	
(+)-3-CCPC	PAL-1123	733	ND	IA (RI)	ND	Cathinone	
3-CEC	PAL-361	IA	ND	IA	ND	Cathinone	
3-Cl-4-Me-CPC	PAL-820	181	ND	IA (RI)	ND	Cathinone	
3′-Cl-5-Me-PM	PAL-738	23 (E_{max} = 96%)	65 (E_{max} = 89%)	58 (E_{max} = 78%)	SNDRA	Phenylmorpholine	
3-CMC (clophedrone)	PAL-434	211–410	19–54.4	26–46.8	SNDRA	Cathinone	
3-CPC	PAL-363	IA	ND	IA (RI)	ND	Cathinone	
3′-CPM	PAL-594	301	75 (82% at 10 μM)	27 (100% at 10 μM)	ND	Phenylmorpholine	
3-FA	PAL-353	1937	16.1	24.2	NDRA	Amphetamine	
3-FMC	ND	1460	ND (100% at 10 μM)	64.8	NDRA	Cathinone	
3′-FPM	PAL-593	1269–2558	17–30	43–60	NDRA	Phenylmorpholine	
3-MA	PAL-314	218	18.3	33.3	NDRA	Amphetamine	
3-MCPC	PAL-588	1067	ND	IA (RI)	ND	Cathinone	
3-MeO-A	ND	ND	58.0	103	ND	Amphetamine	
3-MeO-CPC	PAL-591	1014	ND	IA (RI)	ND	Cathinone	
3-MeO-MC	ND	306–683	111 (68% at 10 μM)	109–129	SNDRA	Cathinone	
3-MeO-PM	PAL-823	ND (78% at 10 μM)	ND (86% at 10 μM)	ND (96% at 10 μM)	ND	Phenylmorpholine	
3-MMC	ND	268–292	27	28–70.6	SNDRA	Cathinone	
3-MPM	PAL-773	5383	509	1321	SNDRA	Phenylmorpholine	
3-TFMeO-MC	ND	188	ND (79% at 10 μM)	729	SNDRA	Cathinone	
3-TFMMC (3-TFMAP)	ND	297–380	2700 (78% at 10 μM)	610–1290	SNDRA	Cathinone	
3,4-DCCPC	PAL-787	356	ND	IA (RI)	ND	Cathinone	
4-APBT	ND	21.2	46.2	66.6	SNDRA	APBT	
4-Benzylpiperidine	ND	5246	41.4	109	NDRA	Benzylpiperidine	
4-BMC (brephedrone)	ND	42.5–60.2	100	59.4	SNDRA	Cathinone	
4-CA (PCA)	ND	28.3	23.5–26.2	42.2–68.5	SNDRA	Amphetamine	
4-CC	ND	128.4	85.1	221.8	SNDRA	Cathinone	
4-CCPC	PAL-743	1632	ND	IA (RI)	ND	Cathinone	
4-CEA (PCEA)	ND	33.8	162.6	238.0	SNDRA	Amphetamine	
4-CEC	ND	152.6	5194.0	353.6	SDRA	Cathinone	
4-CMA (PCMA)	ND	29.9	36.5	54.7	SNDRA	Amphetamine	
4-CMC (clephedrone)	ND	71.1–144	44–90.9	42.2–74.7	SNDRA	Cathinone	
4-Et-PEA	PAL-505	ND	ND	2087	ND	Phenethylamine	
4-FA	PAL-303	730–939	28.0–37	51.5–200	NDRA	Amphetamine	
4-Fluoro-T	PAL-551	108	1123	106	SDRA	Tryptamine	
4-FMC (flephedrone)	ND	1290–1450	62	83.4–119	NDRA	Cathinone	
4-FPM	PAL-635	2403 (88% at 10 μM)	285 (100% at 10 μM)	529 (95% at 10 μM)	SNDRA	Phenylmorpholine	
4′-FPM	PAL-748	1895	58	191	NDRA	Phenylmorpholine	
4-iPr-PEA	PAL-595	ND	ND	IA	ND	Phenethylamine	
4-MA	PAL-313	53.4	22.2	44.1	SNDRA	Amphetamine	
4-MAR	ND	ND	ND	ND	ND	Phenyloxazolamine	
cis-4-MAR	ND	53.2	4.8	1.7	NDRA	Phenyloxazolamine	
4-MBA	ND	IA	IA	IA	IA	Amphetamine	
4-MCPC	PAL-744	667	ND	IA (RI)	ND	Cathinone	
4-MEA	ND	102	182	550	SNDRA	Amphetamine	
4-MeO-MC (methedrone)	ND	120–195	111	506–881	SNDRA	Cathinone	
4-MeO-T	PAL-548	4114	>10000	>10000	SRA	Tryptamine	
4-MMA	ND	67.4	66.9	41.3	SNDRA	Amphetamine	
4-MPA	ND	650	752	IA	SNRA	Amphetamine	
4-MPEA (4-Me-PEA)	PAL-503	ND	ND	271	ND	Phenethylamine	
4-MPM	PAL-747	86	62	227	SNDRA	Phenylmorpholine	
4-MTA	ND	ND	ND	ND	ND	Amphetamine	
4-MTMA	PAL-1063	21	ND	ND	ND	Amphetamine	
4-tBu-MC	ND	IA	ND	942 (E_{max} ≈ 50%)	ND	Cathinone	
4-TFMeO-MC	ND	118	ND	7510	ND	Cathinone	
4-TFMMC (4-TFMAP)	ND	190–270	900	2700–4230	SNRA	Cathinone	
4,4'-DMAR	ND	ND	ND	ND	SNDRA	Phenyloxazolamine	ND
cis-4,4'-DMAR	ND	17.7–59.9	11.8–31.6	8.6–24.4	SNDRA	Phenyloxazolamine	
trans-4,4'-DMAR	ND	59.9	31.6	24.4	SNDRA	Phenyloxazolamine	
5-APB	ND	19	21	31	SNDRA	Amphetamine	
5-APBT	ND	10.3	38.4	92.8	SNDRA	APBT	
5-API (5-IT)	PAL-571	28–104.8	13.3–79	12.9–173	SNDRA	Amphetamine	
5-Bromo-T	PAL-518	75.0	>10000	478	SDRA	Tryptamine	
5-Chloro-αET	PAL-526	33.2	>10000	IA (RI)	SRA	α-Ethyltryptamine	
5-Chloro-αMT	PAL-542	16.2	3434	54.3	SDRA	α-Methyltryptamine	
5-Chloro-T	PAL-441	19.1	>10000	476	SRA	Tryptamine	
5-Fluoro-αET	PAL-545	36.6	5334	150	SDRA	α-Ethyltryptamine	
5-Fluoro-αMT	PAL-544; PAL-212	14–19	78–126	32–37	SNDRA	α-Methyltryptamine	
5-Fluoro-T	PAL-284	10.1	464	82.3	SDRA	Tryptamine	
5-MABB (5-MBPB)	ND	ND	ND	ND	ND	Amphetamine	
(S)-5-MABB	ND	31	158	210	SNDRA	Amphetamine	
(R)-5-MABB	ND	49	850	IA	SRA	Amphetamine	
5-MAPB	ND	64–90	24	41–459	SNDRA	Amphetamine	
(S)-5-MAPB	ND	67	ND	258	ND	Amphetamine	
(R)-5-MAPB	ND	184	ND	1951	ND	Amphetamine	
5-MeO-αMT	ND	460	8900	1500	SNDRA	α-Methyltryptamine	
5-MeO-DALT	ND	>100000	>100000	>100000	IA	Tryptamine	
5-MeO-DET	ND	IA (RI)	IA	IA	SRI	Tryptamine	
5-MeO-DiPT	ND	>100000 (RI)	>100000 (RI)	>100000	IA	Tryptamine	
5-MeO-DMT	ND	>100000 (RI)	>100000 (RI)	>100000	IA	Tryptamine	
5-MeO-DPT	ND	IA (RI)	IA	IA (RI)	SRI	Tryptamine	
5-MeO-MiPT	ND	>100000	>100000	>100000	IA	Tryptamine	
5-MeO-NET	ND	284	>10000	>10000	SRA	Tryptamine	
5-MeO-NiPT	ND	IA (RI)	IA	IA	SRI	Tryptamine	
5-MeO-NMT	ND	1114	>10000	>10000	SRA	Tryptamine	
5-MeO-T	PAL-234	2169	>10000	11031	SDRA	Tryptamine	
5-Methyl-T	PAL-22	139	>10000	>10000	SRA	Tryptamine	
6-APB	ND	36	14	10	SNDRA	Amphetamine	
6-APBT	ND	10.7	13.6	7.2	SNDRA	APBT	
6-API (6-IT)	ND	19.9	25.6	164.0	SNDRA	Amphetamine	
6-Fluoro-T	PAL-227	4.4	1575	106	SRA	Tryptamine	
6-MABB (6-MBPB)	ND	ND	ND	ND	ND	Amphetamine	
(R)-6-MABB	ND	172	227	IA	SNRA	Amphetamine	
(S)-6-MABB	ND	54	77	41	SNDRA	Amphetamine	
6-MAPB	ND	33	14	20	SNDRA	Amphetamine	
6-MeO-T	PAL-263	53.8	465	113	SNDRA	Tryptamine	
6-Methyl-T	PAL-522	51.6	>10000	353	SDRA	Tryptamine	
7-APBT	ND	36.9	28.5	16.8	SNDRA	APBT	
7-Chloro-T	PAL-532	8.03	656	1330	SRA	Tryptamine	
7-MeO-T	PAL-533	44.6	5600	2118	SRA	Tryptamine	
7-Methyl-T	PAL-286	23.7	>10000	3380	SRA	Tryptamine	
α-Ethyltryptamine (AET, αET)	PAL-125	23.2	640	232	SDRA	α-Ethyltryptamine	
(–)-α-Ethyltryptamine	PAL-640	54.9	3670	654	SRA	α-Ethyltryptamine	
(+)-α-Ethyltryptamine	PAL-647	34.7	592	57.6	SDRA	α-Ethyltryptamine	
α-Me-MC (βk-mephentermine; RAD-081)	ND	12860	153	590	NDRA	Cathinone	
α-Methylisotryptamine (isoAMT)	PAL-569	177	81	1062	SNRA	Isotryptamine	
α-Methyltryptamine (αMT; AMT)	PAL-17	21.7–68	79–112	78.6–180	SNDRA	α-Methyltryptamine	
βk-NMPEA (FTS-096)	ND	>60000	148	1860	NRA	Phenethylamine	
AMAPN	ND	21	ND	55	ND	Cathinone	
Amfepramone (diethylpropion)	ND	>10000	>10000	>10000	PD	Cathinone	
Aminorex	ND	193–414	15.1–26.4	9.1–49.4	SNDRA	Phenyloxazolamine	
Amphetamine (A)	ND	ND	ND	ND	NDRA	Amphetamine	ND
Dextroamphetamine	ND	698–1765	6.6–10.2	5.8–24.8	NDRA	Amphetamine	
Levoamphetamine	ND	ND	9.5	27.7	NDRA	Amphetamine	
APPEA (α-Pr-PEA)	PAL-550	IA	ND	IA (RI)	ND	Amphetamine	
BDB	ND	180	540	2,300	SNRA	Amphetamine	
Benzylpiperazine (BZP)	ND	6050–>10000	62–68	175–600	NDRA	Benzylpiperazine	
BK-NM-AMT	ND	41.3	ND (55% at 10 μM)	92.8	SDRA	α-Methyltryptamine	
BK-5F-NM-AMT	ND	190	ND	620	ND	α-Methyltryptamine	
BK-5Cl-NM-AMT	ND	200	ND	865	ND	α-Methyltryptamine	
BK-5Br-NM-AMT	ND	295	ND	2100	ND	α-Methyltryptamine	
BMAPN	ND	27	ND (94% at 10 μM)	34	SNDRA	Cathinone	
BMPEA (β-Me-PEA)	ND	ND	126	627	ND	Phenethylamine	
Bretisilocin (5F-MET; GM-2505)	ND	8.4–15.7 (E_{max} = 67–71%)	ND	ND	ND	Tryptamine	
Bufotenin (DMS, 5-HO-DMT)	ND	30.5	>10000	>10000	SRA	Tryptamine	
Buphedrone (βk-MEPEA)	PAL-429	IA	ND	411	ND	Cathinone	
Bupropion (amfebutamone)	ND	IA (RI)	IA (RI)	IA (RI)	NDRI	Cathinone	
Butylamphetamine (NBA, BA)	PAL-90	ND	ND	IA	ND	Amphetamine	
Butylone (βk-MBDB)	ND	330	IA (RI)	IA (RI)	SRA/NDRI	Cathinone	
Cathinone (C; βk-AMPH)	ND	6100–7595	23.6–25.6	34.8–83.1	NDRA	Cathinone	
D-Cathinone	ND	>10000	72.0	183.9	NDRA	Cathinone	
L-Cathinone	ND	2366–9267	12.4–28	18–24.6	NDRA	Cathinone	
Chlorphentermine	ND	18.2–30.9	>10000 (RI)	935–2650	SRA	Amphetamine	
DEPEA (α-Et-EPEA)	ND	ND	209	604	ND	Amphetamine	
Dibutylone	ND	IA	IA (RI)	IA (RI)	DRI	Cathinone	
Diethyltryptamine (DET)	ND	IA (RI)	IA	IA	SRI	Tryptamine	
Diisopropyltryptamine (DiPT)	ND	IA (RI)	IA (RI)	IA	SRI	Tryptamine	
Dimethylamphetamine	ND	ND	223	1250	ND	Amphetamine	
Dimethyltryptamine (DMT)	ND	81–114 (E_{max} = 81%)	4166	>10000	SRA	Tryptamine	
Dipropyltryptamine (DPT)	ND	>100000 (RI)	>100000 (RI)	>100000 (RI)	IA	Tryptamine	
DMPP (2,3-DMPP)	PAL-218	24–26 (E_{max} = 85%)	13.7–56 (E_{max} = 62%)	1207–1320 (E_{max} = 66%)	SNRA	Phenylpiperazine	
DMPPA (β,N,N-TMPEA)	ND	ND	1337 (E_{max} = 67%)	IA	NRA	Phenethylamine	
DOC	ND	IA	IA	IA	IA	Amphetamine	
DOM	ND	IA	IA	IA	IA	Amphetamine	
Dopamine (DA)	ND	>10000 (RI)	66.2	86.9	NDRA	Phenethylamine	
EDMA	ND	117	325	597	SNDRA	Amphetamine	
EDMC	ND	347	327	496	SNDRA	Cathinone	
ENAP	PAL-1045	12	137	46	SDRA	Amphetamine	
Ephedrine (racephedrine)	ND	ND	ND	ND	NDRA	Cathinol	ND
D-Ephedrine (ephedrine)	ND	>10000	43.1–72.4	236–1350	NDRA	Cathinol	
L-Ephedrine	ND	>10000	218	2104	NRA	Cathinol	
Ephylone	ND	IA (RI)	IA (RI)	IA (RI)	IA (NDRI)	Cathinone	
Epinephrine	ND	ND	ND	ND	NDRA	Phenethylamine	ND
Ethcathinone (EC)	ND	1923–2118	88.3–99.3	267.6–>1000	NRA	Cathinone	
Ethylamphetamine (EA)	PAL-99	ND	ND	88.5	ND	Amphetamine	
S(+)-Ethylamphetamine	ND	333.0	28.8	44.1	NDRA	Amphetamine	
Ethylone (βk-MDEA)	ND	617.4	4251	1122	SNDRA	Cathinone	
Eutylone (βk-EBDB)	ND	1020	IA (RI)	IA (RI)	SRA/NDRI	Cathinone	
Fenfluramine (3-TFM-EA)	ND	79.3–108	739	>10000 (RI)	SRA	Amphetamine	
D-Fenfluramine	ND	51.7	302	>10000	SNRA	Amphetamine	
L-Fenfluramine	ND	147	>10000	>10000	SRA	Amphetamine	
HHA	ND	ND	33	3485	ND	Amphetamine	
HHMA	ND	1729	77	130	NDRA	Amphetamine	
HHMC	ND	14100	110	90	NDRA	Cathinone	
HMA	ND	897	694	1450–3423	SNDRA	Amphetamine	
HMMA	ND	589–607	625	607–3652	SNDRA	Amphetamine	
HMMC	ND	7210	6340	5840	SNDRA	Cathinone	
MBDB	ND	540	3300	>100000	SNRA	Amphetamine	
mCPP (3-CPP, 3CPP)	ND	28–38.1	≥1400	63000	SRA	Phenylpiperazine	
MDA	ND	160–162	47–108	106–190	SNDRA	Amphetamine	
(R)-MDA	ND	310	290	900	SNDRA	Amphetamine	
(S)-MDA	ND	100	50.0	98.5	SNDRA	Amphetamine	
MDAI	ND	114	117	1334	SNRA	2-Aminoindane	
MDC	ND	966	394	370	SNDRA	Cathinone	
MDEA	PAL-192	47	2608	622	SNDRA	Amphetamine	
(R)-MDEA	PAL-193	52	651	507	SNDRA	Amphetamine	
(S)-MDEA	PAL-194	465	RI	RI	SRA	Amphetamine	
MDDMA	ND	588.8	IA	IA	SRA	Amphetamine	
MDMA	ND	50–85	54–110	51–278	SNDRA	Amphetamine	
(R)-MDMA	ND	340	560	3700	SNDRA	Amphetamine	
(S)-MDMA	ND	74	136	142	SNDRA	Amphetamine	
MDMAR	ND	ND	ND	ND	SNDRA	Phenyloxazolamine	ND
cis-MDMAR	ND	43.9	14.8	10.2	SNDRA	Phenyloxazolamine	
trans-MDMAR	ND	73.4	38.9	36.2	SNDRA	Phenyloxazolamine	
MDPV	ND	IA	13 (E_{max} = 24%)	2.3 (E_{max} = 24%)	NDRI	Phenylethylpyrrolidine	
MDTMA	ND	IA	IA	IA	IA	Amphetamine	
MEAI (5-MeO-AI)	ND	134	861	2646	SNRA	2-Aminoindane	
MEPEA (α-Et-MPEA)	PAL-426	4698	58	179–225	NDRA	Amphetamine	
Mephedrone (4-MMC)	ND	118.3–122	58–62.7	49.1–51	SNDRA	Cathinone	
S(–)-Mephedrone	ND	61	ND	74	ND	Cathinone	
R(+)-Mephedrone	ND	1470	ND	31	ND	Cathinone	
Mesocarb	ND	ND	ND	>100000 (RI)	DRI	Amphetamine	
Methamphetamine (MA)	ND	ND	ND	ND	NDRA	Amphetamine	ND
Dextromethamphetamine	ND	736–1292	12.3–14.3	8.5–40.4	NDRA	Amphetamine	
Levomethamphetamine	ND	4640	28.5	416	NRA	Amphetamine	
Methcathinone (MC)	ND	2592–5853	22–26.1	12.5–49.9	NDRA	Cathinone	
D-Methcathinone	ND	IA	ND	ND	NRA	Cathinone	
L-Methcathinone	ND	1772	13.1	14.8	NDRA	Cathinone	
Methiopropamine	ND	IA (RI)	IA (RI)	IA (RI)	NDRI	Thiopropamine	
Methylone (MDMC)	ND	234–708	140–270	117–220	SNDRA	Cathinone	
Methylphenidate	ND	IA (RI)	IA (RI)	IA (RI)	NDRI	Phenidate	
Methylethyltryptamine (MET)	ND	182.7	ND	ND	ND	Tryptamine	
Mexedrone (4-MMC-MeO)	ND	2525	IA (RI)	IA (RI)	SRA/NDRI	Cathinone	
MiPT	ND	IA	IA	IA	IA	Tryptamine	
MMAI	ND	31	3101	>10000	SRA	2-Aminoindane	
MNAP (methamnetamine)	PAL-1046	13	34	10	SNDRA	Amphetamine	
MPPA (BMMPEA, β-Me-NMPEA)	ND	ND	154	574	ND	Phenethylamine	
Naphthylisopropylamine (NAP)	PAL-287	3.4	11.1	12.6	SNDRA	Amphetamine	
Naphthylmetrazine	PAL-704	IA (RI)	203	111	NDRA/SRI	Phenylmorpholine	
Naphthylmorpholine	PAL-678	ND (92% at 10 μM)	ND (88% at 10 μM)	ND (79% at 10 μM)	ND	Phenylmorpholine	
NET (NETP; N-Et-T)	PAL-536	18.6	IA (RI)	IA (RI)	SRA	Tryptamine	
NiPT	ND	IA (RI)	IA	IA	SRI	Tryptamine	
NMT	PAL-152	22.4	733	321	SRA	Tryptamine	
Norephedrine (phenylpropanolamine)	ND	ND	ND	ND	NDRA	Cathinol	ND
D-Norephedrine	ND	>10000	42.1	302	NDRA	Cathinol	
L-Norephedrine	ND	>10000	137	1371	NRA	Cathinol	
Norepinephrine (NE)	ND	>10000	164	869	NDRA	Phenethylamine	
Norfenfluramine (3-TFMA)	ND	104	168–170	1900–1925	SNRA	Amphetamine	
(+)-Norfenfluramine	ND	59.3	72.7	924	SNRA	Amphetamine	
(–)-Norfenfluramine	ND	287	474	>10000	SNRA	Amphetamine	
Normephedrone (4-MC)	ND	210	100	220	SNDRA	Cathinone	
R(+)-Normephedrone	ND	179	89	150	SNDRA	Cathinone	
S(–)-Normephedrone	ND	1592	115	391	NDRA	Cathinone	
Norpropylhexedrine	ND	ND	ND	ND	NDRA	Cyclohexylethylamine	ND
Norpseudoephedrine	ND	ND	ND	ND	NDRA	Cathinol	ND
D-Norpseudoephedrine (cathine)	ND	>10000	15.0	68.3	NDRA	Cathinol	
L-Norpseudoephedrine	ND	>10000	30.1	294	NDRA	Cathinol	
ODMA	ND	ND	ND	ND	SNDRA	Amphetamine	
oMPP (2-MPP)	PAL-169	175	39.1	296–542	SNDRA	Phenylpiperazine	
PMA (4-MeO-A)	ND	ND	166	867	SNDRA	Amphetamine	
PMMA (4-MeO-MA)	ND	ND	ND	ND	SNDRA	Amphetamine	
(S)-PMMA	ND	41	147	1000	SNRA	Amphetamine	
(R)-PMMA	ND	134	>14000	1600	SRA	Amphetamine	
Pentylone	ND	476–1030 (E_{max} ≈ 50%)	IA (RI)	IA (RI)	SRA/NDRI	Cathinone	
Phenacylamine (βk-PEA)	PAL-27	>10000	ND (96% at 10 μM)	208	NDRA	Phenethylamine	
Phendimetrazine	ND	>100000	>10000	>10000	PD	Phenylmorpholine	
Phenethylamine (PEA)	ND	>10000	10.9	39.5	NDRA	Phenethylamine	
Phenmetrazine (PM)	PAL-55	7765–>10000	29–50.4	70–131	NDRA	Phenylmorpholine	
(+)-Phenmetrazine	ND	3246	37.5	87.4	NDRA	Phenylmorpholine	
(–)-Phenmetrazine	ND	>10000	62.9	415	NDRA	Phenylmorpholine	
Phentermine (P, PH)	ND	2575–3511	28.8–39.4	262	NDRA	Amphetamine	
Phenylalaninol	ND	ND	ND	ND	ND	Amphetamine	ND
D-Phenylalaninol	PAL-329	>10000	106	1355	NRA	Amphetamine	
Phenylbutenamine	ND	ND	ND	ND	ND	Phenylbutenamine	ND
(3E)-Phenylbutenamine	PAL-881	>10000	308	666	NDRA	Phenylbutenamine	
(3Z)-Phenylbutenamine	PAL-893	>10000	301	1114	NDRA	Phenylbutenamine	
Phenylbutynamine	PAL-874	>10000	305	688	NDRA	Phenylbutynamine	
Phenylisobutylamine (α-Et-PEA, AEPEA)	ND	4698	80	225–273	NDRA	Amphetamine	
Phenylpropylamine	ND	ND	222	1491	NDRA	Phenylpropylamine	
pMeOPP (4-MeOPP)	ND	3200	440–1500	6300–11000	SNRA	Phenylpiperazine	
pMPP (4-MPP)	PAL-233	220	>10000	>20000	SRA	Phenylpiperazine	
pNPP (4-NPP)	PAL-175	19–43 (E_{max} = 57%)	>10000	>10000	SRA	Phenylpiperazine	
Propylamphetamine (PA)	PAL-424	ND	ND	RI (1013)	ND	Amphetamine	
Propylcathinone (PC)	PAL-359	ND	ND	IA	ND	Cathinone	
Propylhexedrine	ND	ND	ND	ND	NDRA	Cyclohexylethylamine	ND
Propylone	ND	3128	IA (RI)	975.9	SDRA	Cathinone	
Pseudoephedrine (racemic)	ND	ND	ND	ND	NDRA	Cathinol	ND
D-Pseudoephedrine	ND	>10000	4092	9125	NDRA	Cathinol	
L-Pseudoephedrine (pseudoephedrine)	ND	>10000	224	1988	NRA	Cathinol	
Pseudophenmetrazine	ND	>10000	514	IA (RI)	NRA/DRI	Phenylmorpholine	
(+)-Pseudophenmetrazine	ND	>10000	349	1457	NDRA	Phenylmorpholine	
(–)-Pseudophenmetrazine	ND	>10000	2511	IA (RI)	NRA/DRI	Phenylmorpholine	
Psilocin	PAL-153	561 (E_{max} = 54%)	>10000	>10000	SRA	Tryptamine	
SeDMA	ND	ND	ND	ND	SNDRA	Amphetamine	
Serotonin (5-HT)	ND	44.4	>10000 (RI)	≥1960	SRA	Tryptamine	
TDMA	ND	ND	ND	ND	SNDRA	Amphetamine	
TFMCPP (3-TFM-4-C-PP)	PAL-179	33 (E_{max} = 66%)	>10000	>10000	SRA	Phenylpiperazine	
TFMPP (3-TFMPP)	ND	121	>10000	>10000	SRA	Phenylpiperazine	
TMA (3,4,5-TMeO-A)	ND	16000	>100000	>100000	SRA	Amphetamine	
TMA-2 (2,4,5-TMeO-A)	ND	>100000	>100000	>100000	IA	Amphetamine	
TMA-6 (2,4,6-TMeO-A)	ND	>100000	>100000	>100000	IA	Amphetamine	
Tramadol	ND	IA (RI)	IA (RI)	IA	SNRI	ND	
Tryptamine (T)	PAL-235	32.6	716	164	SDRA	Tryptamine	
Tyramine	ND	2775	40.6	119	NDRA	Phenethylamine	
Notes: (1) The smaller the value, the more potently the substance releases the neurotransmitter. (2) These values were from assays conducted using rat brain synaptosomes. Values from other methods of quantifying monoamine release, such as HEK293 cells transfected with monoamine transporters, are not fully analogous to neuronal cells and result in much different and lower potencies. As a result, they are not included in this table.

In addition to the potencies of MRAs in terms of their MRA activity, data on the affinities (K_{i}) of various MRAs for the monoamine transporters (MATs) and their potencies (IC_{50}) in acting as monoamine reuptake inhibitors (MRIs) have been published. Activities of MRAs at the vesicular monoamine transporter 2 (VMAT2) have been published as well.
