= C8H19N =

The molecular formula C_{8}H_{19}N (molar mass: 129.24 g/mol) may refer to:

- 1-Octylamine
- Dibutylamine
- N,N-Diisopropylethylamine, or Hünig's base
- Octodrine
- Oenethyl
