= C10H11N =

The molecular formula C_{10}H_{11}N (molar mass: 145.2 g/mol; exact mass: 145.089149 u) may refer to:

- 2-Amino-1,2-dihydronaphthalene
- Phenylbutynamine
