= C7H17N =

The molecular formula C_{7}H_{17}N (molar mass: 115.22 g/mol, exact mass: 115.1361 u) may refer to:

- 1,4-Dimethylamylamine
- Methylhexanamine (also known as methylhexamine, 1,3-dimethylamylamine, 1,3-DMAA, dimethylamylamine, and DMAA)
- Tuaminoheptane
