= Oenethyl =

Clinical data
- Trade names: Pacamine; Neosupranol
- Other names: Œnethyl; Önethyl; 2-Methylaminoheptane; N,1-Dimethylhexylamine; 2-Heptylmethylamine; 2-(N-Methyl)heptylamine
- Drug class: Sympathomimetic; Vasopressor; Nasal decongestant

Identifiers
- IUPAC name: N-methylheptan-2-amine
- CAS Number: 540-43-2
- PubChem CID: 10896
- ChemSpider: 10434
- UNII: GXY7TL4M5R
- CompTox Dashboard (EPA): DTXSID50862150

Chemical and physical data
- Formula: C_{8}H_{19}N
- Molar mass: 129.247 g·mol^{−1}
- 3D model (JSmol): Interactive image
- SMILES: CCCCCC(C)NC
- InChI: InChI=1S/C8H19N/c1-4-5-6-7-8(2)9-3/h8-9H,4-7H2,1-3H3; Key:BGWFQRDYRSCOCO-UHFFFAOYSA-N

Oenethyl, also known as 2-methylaminoheptane and sold under the brand names Pacamine and Neosupranol, is a sympathomimetic and vasopressor medication of the alkylamine which is no longer marketed. It was used as a nasal decongestant and to control blood pressure during anesthesia. It is closely structurally related to other alkylamines, for instance methylhexanamine and tuaminoheptane, among others. These compounds are known to act as structurally simple monoamine releasing agents and to produce psychostimulant-like effects.

== See also ==
- 1,3-Dimethylbutylamine
- 1,4-Dimethylamylamine
- Heptaminol
- Iproheptine
- Isometheptene
- Methylhexanamine
- Octodrine
- Tuaminoheptane
