= C10H13N3O =

The molecular formula C_{10}H_{13}N_{3}O may refer to:

- AL-34662
- ODMA (drug)
