= Phenylbutenamine =

Clinical data
- Other names: 4-Phenylbut-3-en-2-amine; 1-Methyl-3-phenylprop-2-enylamine; PAL-881/PAL-893
- Drug class: Norepinephrine–dopamine releasing agent

Identifiers
- IUPAC name: 4-phenylbut-3-en-2-amine
- PubChem CID: 179624
- ChemSpider: 28545154

Chemical and physical data
- Formula: C_{10}H_{13}N
- Molar mass: 147.221 g·mol^{−1}
- 3D model (JSmol): Interactive image
- SMILES: CC(C=CC1=CC=CC=C1)N
- InChI: InChI=1S/C10H13N/c1-9(11)7-8-10-5-3-2-4-6-10/h2-9H,11H2,1H3; Key:QPVUUOXSCVQZQG-UHFFFAOYSA-N

Phenylbutenamine, or 4-phenylbut-3-en-2-amine, is a monoamine releasing agent (MRA) of the arylalkylamine family related to β-phenethylamine and amphetamine. It has two possible stereoisomers: (3E)-phenylbutenamine (PAL-881) and (3Z)-phenylbutenamine (PAL-893). Both of these enantiomers act as norepinephrine–dopamine releasing agents (NDRAs), and to similar comparative extents, albeit with far lower potency than β-phenethylamine or amphetamine.

== See also ==
- Phenylbutynamine
- Phenylpropylamine
