= TDMA =

TDMA may refer to:

- TDMA (drug), an MDMA analogue
- Time-division multiple access, a channel-access scheme
- Tridiagonal matrix algorithm, a mathematical system
- Digital AMPS (IS-54 and IS-136), a 2G mobile-phone standard that uses time-division multiple access
