= Aminobenzocycloheptene =

Aminobenzocycloheptenes include:

- 6-Amino-6,7,8,9-tetrahydro-5H-benzocycloheptene (6-AB)
- 7-Amino-6,7,8,9-tetrahydro-5H-benzocycloheptene (7-AB)
