= Iproheptine =

Chemical compound

Clinical data
- Trade names: Metron, Susat
- Other names: N-Isopropyl-1,5-dimethylhexylamine; N-Isopropyloctodrine

Identifiers
- IUPAC name: 6-methyl-N-propan-2-ylheptan-2-amine
- CAS Number: 13946-02-6
- PubChem CID: 19917
- ChemSpider: 18760
- UNII: P021X7VTG0
- KEGG: D01515
- ChEBI: CHEBI:134804
- ChEMBL: ChEMBL2103925
- CompTox Dashboard (EPA): DTXSID8046248
- ECHA InfoCard: 100.034.283

Chemical and physical data
- Formula: C_{11}H_{25}N
- Molar mass: 171.328 g·mol^{−1}
- 3D model (JSmol): Interactive image
- SMILES: CC(C)CCCC(C)NC(C)C
- InChI: InChI=1S/C11H25N/c1-9(2)7-6-8-11(5)12-10(3)4/h9-12H,6-8H2,1-5H3; Key:NKGYBXHAQAKSSG-UHFFFAOYSA-N

Iproheptine, also known as N-isopropyl-1,5-dimethylhexylamine or N-isopropyloctodrine and sold under the brand names Metron and Susat, is a nasal decongestant which has been marketed in Japan. It is described as a vasoconstrictor and antihistamine. The drug is available over-the-counter in Japan.

== Pharmacology ==
=== Pharmacodynamics ===
Iproheptine is described as a decongestant, vasoconstrictor, and antihistamine. Its pharmacology was characterized in a series of several preclinical studies published in the 1960s.

The drug was found to have anticholinergic- and antihistamine-like effects that were described as more potent than those of ephedrine. It was said to have hypotensive and cardiac inhibitive actions that made it differ from other known alkylamine and arylalkylamine sympathomimetics. The effects of iproheptine on blood vessels, pupils, and saliva secretion were all said to be very weak. It produced bronchodilation, vasoconstriction, and hemostasis similarly to ephedrine or methoxyphenamine. Iproheptine showed no effect against hexobarbital-induced sleep. Conversely, it showed an antidepressant- or stimulant-like effect in the forced swim test (FST).

Close analogues of iproheptine, such as methylhexanamine and tuaminoheptane, are known to act as norepinephrine and/or dopamine releasing agents by interacting with the monoamine transporters, and this is thought to underlie their sympathomimetic and stimulant effects.

=== Pharmacokinetics ===
In contrast to arylalkylamines like phenethylamines and tryptamines, iproheptine is not metabolized by monoamine oxidase (MAO).

== Chemistry ==
Iproheptine, also known as N-isopropyl-1,5-dimethylhexylamine or as N-isopropyloctodrine, is an alkylamine and the N-isopropyl derivative of octodrine (2-amino-6-methylheptane or 1,5-dimethylhexylamine (1,5-DMHA)).

Aside from octodrine, it is also closely structurally related to other alkylamines, including 1,3-dimethylbutylamine (1,3-DMBA), 1,4-dimethylamylamine (1,4-DMAA), heptaminol (2-methyl-6-amino-2-heptanol), isometheptene (2-methyl-6-methylamino-2-heptene), methylhexanamine (1,3-dimethylamylamine (1,3-DMAA)), and tuaminoheptane (tuamine; 2-aminoheptane or 1-methylhexylamine).

Iproheptine shows structural similarity to what would be 3- or 4-methyl-N-isopropylamphetamine, but with the equivalent of the phenyl ring open and incomplete (i.e., missing two carbon atoms, saturated, and the carbons not connected to form a ring).

The predicted log P (XLogP3) of iproheptine is 3.6.

== History ==
Iproheptine was first described in the scientific literature by 1960 and was first patented by 1962. It remained marketed in Japan in 2004.

== Society and culture ==
=== Names ===
Iproheptine is the generic name of the drug and its INN. In the case of the hydrochloride salt, its generic name is iproheptine hydrochloride and this is its JAN. The drug is marketed under the brand names Metron and Susat (both as the hydrochloride salt).

=== Availability ===
Iproheptine appears to have been marketed only in Japan. It is available over-the-counter in this country.

== See also ==
- 1,3-Dimethylbutylamine
- 1,4-Dimethylamylamine
- Heptaminol
- Isometheptene
- Methylhexanamine
- Octodrine
- Oenethyl
- Tuaminoheptane
