= Benzylpiperidine =

Benzylpiperidine may refer to any of several chemical compounds:

- 1-Benzylpiperidine (N-Benzylpiperidine)
- 2-Benzylpiperidine
- 3-Benzylpiperidine
- 4-Benzylpiperidine
