= 1,3-Dimethylbutylamine =

(2S)-DMBA
(2R)-DMBA

Names
- Preferred IUPAC name 4-Methylpentan-2-amine
- Other names 4-Methyl-2-pentylamine

Identifiers
CAS Number	108-09-8
3D model (JSmol)	Interactive image
ChemSpider	7620
ECHA InfoCard	100.003.227
PubChem CID	7908 CID 7908
UNII	KXP599H5R6
CompTox Dashboard (EPA)	DTXSID4025113
- InChI: InChI=1S/C6H15N/c1-5(2)4-6(3)7/h5-6H,4,7H2,1-3H3 Key: UNBMPKNTYKDYCG-UHFFFAOYSA-N; InChI=1/C6H15N/c1-5(2)4-6(3)7/h5-6H,4,7H2,1-3H3 Key: UNBMPKNTYKDYCG-UHFFFAOYAT
- SMILES: CC(C)CC(C)N

Properties
Chemical formula	C_{6}H_{15}N
Molar mass	101.193 g·mol^{−1}
Density	0.717 g/mL
Boiling point	108–110 °C (226–230 °F; 381–383 K)

Pharmacology
Legal status	BR: Class F2 (Prohibited psychotropics)

Hazards
NFPA 704 (fire diamond)	2 3 0
- Except where otherwise noted, data are given for materials in their standard state (at 25 °C [77 °F], 100 kPa). Infobox references

1,3-Dimethylbutylamine (1,3-DMBA, dimethylbutylamine, DMBA, 4-amino-2-methylpentane, or AMP), is a stimulant drug structurally related to methylhexanamine where a butyl group replaces the pentyl group. The compound is an aliphatic amine.

The hydrochloride and citrate salts of DMBA has been identified as unapproved ingredients in some over-the-counter dietary supplements, in which it is used in an apparent attempt to circumvent bans on methylhexanamine. The U.S. Food and Drug Administration (FDA) considers any dietary supplement containing DMBA to be "adulterated". Despite the FDA's opposition, DMBA continues to be sold in the US.

There are no known human safety studies on DMBA and its health effects are entirely unknown.

DMBA is not an agonist of the rodent or human trace amine-associated receptor 1 (TAAR1).

== Doping in sports ==
The substance is listed in doping group S6B, by WADA. One Norwegian football player has tested above the limit. However, in 2026 media told about investigation and conclusion that indicates that the substance came from the court that this player (and her team) played upon.

== See also ==
- List of drugs banned by the World Anti-Doping Agency
- 1,4-Dimethylamylamine
- Heptaminol
- Iproheptine
- Isometheptene
- Isopentylamine
- Methylhexanamine
- Octodrine
- Oenethyl
- Tuaminoheptane
