= Phenylpiperazine =

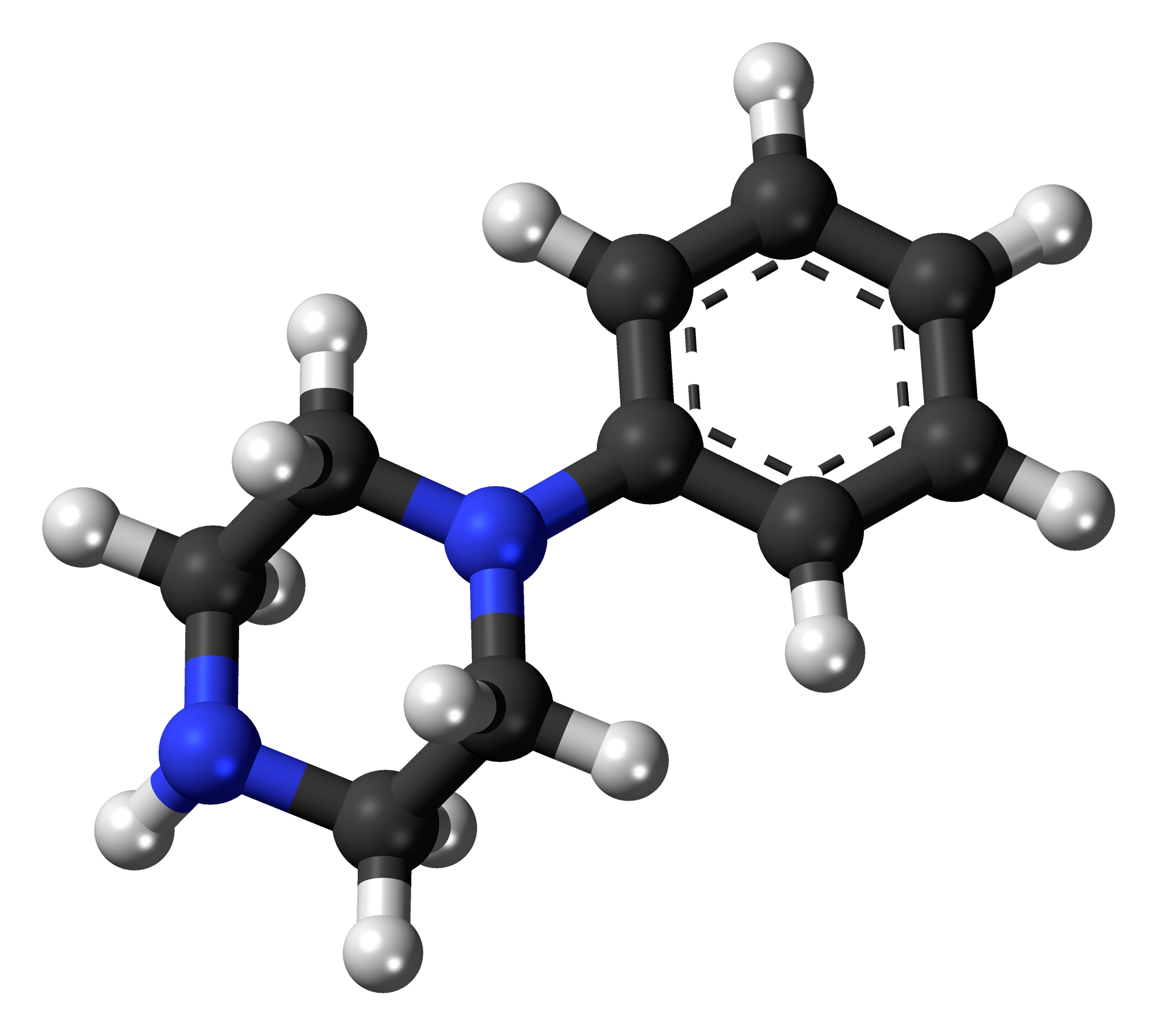

Names
- Preferred IUPAC name 1-Phenylpiperazine

Identifiers
CAS Number	92-54-6
3D model (JSmol)	Interactive image
ChEMBL	ChEMBL9434
ChemSpider	6829
ECHA InfoCard	100.001.969
PubChem CID	7096
UNII	J9225CBI7D
CompTox Dashboard (EPA)	DTXSID8057855
- InChI: InChI=1S/C10H14N2/c1-2-4-10(5-3-1)12-8-6-11-7-9-12/h1-5,11H,6-9H2 Key: YZTJYBJCZXZGCT-UHFFFAOYSA-N
- SMILES: c1cc(ccc1)N2CCNCC2

Properties
Chemical formula	C_{10}H_{14}N_{2}
Molar mass	162.23 g/mol
Appearance	clear colourless to yellow liquid
Density	1.028g/cm^{3}
Melting point	18.8 °C (65.8 °F; 291.9 K)
Boiling point	287.2 °C (549.0 °F; 560.3 K) at 760mmHg
Solubility in water	insoluble

Hazards
Flash point	138.3 °C (280.9 °F; 411.4 K)
- Except where otherwise noted, data are given for materials in their standard state (at 25 °C [77 °F], 100 kPa). Infobox references

1-Phenylpiperazine (1-PP or PP) is a simple chemical compound and drug featuring a phenyl group bound to a piperazine ring. The suffix ‘-piprazole’ is sometimes used in the names of drugs to indicate they belong to this class.

It is a rigid analogue of amphetamine. Similarly to amphetamine, 1-PP is a monoamine releasing agent, with EC_{50} values for monoamine release of 186 nM for norepinephrine, 880 nM for serotonin, and 2,530 nM for dopamine. Based on the preceding values, it is about 4.7-fold less potent in releasing serotonin than norepinephrine and about 13.6-fold less potent in releasing dopamine than norepinephrine. Hence, 1-PP is a modestly selective norepinephrine releasing agent (NRA), or could alternatively be thought of as an imbalanced serotonin–norepinephrine releasing agent (SNRA) or serotonin–norepinephrine–dopamine releasing agent (SNDRA).

Other homologues and rigid analogues of amphetamine besides 1-PP include 2-aminotetralin (2-AT), 2-amino-1,2-dihydronaphthalene (2-ADN), 2-aminoindane (2-AI), 1-naphthylaminopropane (1-NAP), 2-naphthylaminopropane (2-NAP), 6-AB, and 7-AB.

1-Phenylpiperazine shows toxicity at sufficiently high doses; its oral LD_{50} in rats is 210 mg/kg.

Numerous derivatives of 1-PP, or substituted phenylpiperazines, exist. Some examples include meta-chlorophenylpiperazine (mCPP), 3-trifluoromethylphenylpiperazine (TFMPP), and para-methoxyphenylpiperazine (pMeOPP).

== See also ==
- Substituted piperazine
- Serotonin antagonist and reuptake inhibitor
- Benzylpiperazine
- Diphenylpiperazine
- Diphenylmethylpiperazine
- Pyridinylpiperazine
- Pyrimidinylpiperazine
