= Methylenedioxytrimethylamphetamine =

MDTMA

Clinical data
- Other names: 3,4-Methylenedioxy-N,N,N-trimethylamphetamine; MDTMA; Methylenedioxytrimethylamphetamine; N,N,N-Trimethyl-MDA
- ATC code: None

Chemical and physical data
- Formula: C_{13}H_{20}NO_{2}^{+}
- Molar mass: 222.308 g·mol^{−1}
- 3D model (JSmol): Interactive image; iodide: Interactive image
- SMILES: O1COC2C=CC(=CC1=2)CC(C)[N+](C)(C)C; iodide: O1COC2C=CC(=CC1=2)CC(C)[N+](C)(C)C.[I-]
- InChI: InChI=1S/C13H20NO2/c1-10(14(2,3)4)7-11-5-6-12-13(8-11)16-9-15-12/h5-6,8,10H,7,9H2,1-4H3/q+1; Key:WTWQKGODIISWAC-UHFFFAOYSA-N

3,4-Methylenedioxy-N,N,N-trimethylamphetamine (MDTMA), also known as N,N,N-trimethyl-MDA, is a chemical compound of the amphetamine and methylenedioxyamphetamine families. In contrast to 3,4-methylenedioxyamphetamine (MDA), 3,4-methylenedioxy-N-methylamphetamine (MDMA), and 3,4-methylenedioxy-N,N-dimethylamphetamine (MDDMA), MDTMA is completely inactive as a monoamine releasing agent.

== See also ==
- Substituted methylenedioxyphenethylamine
- MDDM (N,N-dimethyl-MDA)
- Dimethylone (βk-MDDM; N,N-dimethyl-MDC)
