= Phenylalaninol =

Psychoactive stimulant and norepinephrine releasing agent

Clinical data
- Other names: DL-Phenylalaninol; Phenylmethylethanolamine; Benzylethanolamine; DL-Phenylglycinol; α-(Hydroxymethyl)phenethylamine; PAL-329; PAL329
- Drug class: Psychostimulant; Norepinephrine releasing agent; Norepinephrine–dopamine releasing agent

Identifiers
- IUPAC name: 2-amino-3-phenylpropan-1-ol
- CAS Number: 16088-07-6
- PubChem CID: 76652
- ChemSpider: 69116
- UNII: C8L8LX87R1
- ChEMBL: ChEMBL21676
- CompTox Dashboard (EPA): DTXSID90863121
- ECHA InfoCard: 100.106.984

Chemical and physical data
- Formula: C_{9}H_{13}NO
- Molar mass: 151.209 g·mol^{−1}
- 3D model (JSmol): Interactive image
- SMILES: C1=CC=C(C=C1)CC(CO)N
- InChI: InChI=1S/C9H13NO/c10-9(7-11)6-8-4-2-1-3-5-8/h1-5,9,11H,6-7,10H2; Key:STVVMTBJNDTZBF-UHFFFAOYSA-N

Phenylalaninol (code name PAL-329), or DL-phenylalaninol, also known as phenylmethylethanolamine or as α-(hydroxymethyl)phenethylamine, is a psychostimulant and monoamine releasing agent (MRA) of the phenethylamine family. It is related to the amino acid phenylalanine and to the phenethylamine psychostimulants β-phenethylamine (phenylethylamine) and amphetamine (α-methylphenethylamine).

Phenylalaninol is a psychostimulant and selective norepinephrine releasing agent (NRA) or norepinephrine-preferring norepinephrine–dopamine releasing agent (NDRA). The EC_{50} values of phenylalaninol for monoamine release are 106 nM for norepinephrine, 1,355 nM for dopamine, and >10,000 nM for serotonin in rat brain synaptosomes. It is dramatically less potent as an MRA than phenethylamine or amphetamine. The potency of phenylalaninol in inducing norepinephrine release is 13-fold higher than its potency in inducing dopamine release. Similarly to other dopamine releasers like amphetamine, the drug shows cocaine-like effects and reinforcing properties in rhesus monkeys. The much greater potency of phenylalaninol in inducing norepinephrine over inducing dopamine release does not appear to interfere with its dopamine release-mediated reinforcing effects.

The clinically used stimulant, wakefulness-promoting agent, and well-balanced norepinephrine–dopamine reuptake inhibitor (NDRI) solriamfetol (brand name Sunosi; O-carbamoyl-D-phenylalaninol) is a derivative of phenylalaninol with a carbamoyl substitution at the hydroxyl group of the molecule. Phenylalaninol is a known impurity in chemical synthesis of solriamfetol.

The predicted log P of phenylalaninol is 0.7 to 0.77 and hence it is relatively hydrophilic. The compound appears to be actively transported in the body by some of the same transporters that transport phenylalanine, such as LAT3.
