= Phenylbutynamine =

Clinical data
- Other names: 4-Phenylbut-3-yn-2-amine; PAL-874; PAL874
- Drug class: Norepinephrine–dopamine releasing agent

Identifiers
- IUPAC name: 4-phenylbut-3-yn-2-amine
- PubChem CID: 15728382
- ChemSpider: 28566744

Chemical and physical data
- Formula: C_{10}H_{11}N
- Molar mass: 145.205 g·mol^{−1}
- 3D model (JSmol): Interactive image
- SMILES: CC(C#CC1=CC=CC=C1)N
- InChI: InChI=1S/C10H11N/c1-9(11)7-8-10-5-3-2-4-6-10/h2-6,9H,11H2,1H3; Key:CBRPSVDSBGTOKK-UHFFFAOYSA-N

Phenylbutynamine (4-phenylbut-3-yn-2-amine; development code PAL-874) is a monoamine releasing agent (MRA) of the arylalkylamine family related to β-phenethylamine and amphetamine. It acts as a norepinephrine–dopamine releasing agent (NDRA), albeit with far lower potency than β-phenethylamine or amphetamine.

== See also ==
- Phenylbutenamine
- Phenylpropylamine
