= Richard B. Rothman =

American pharmacologist

- Education: University of Virginia
- Occupation: Pharmacologist
- Years active: 1979–2019
- Employer: National Institute of Drug Abuse

Richard B. Rothman is a pharmacologist who received his MD and Ph.D. degrees in pharmacology from the University of Virginia in 1982. Currently he is a senior investigator in the clinical pharmacology section of the National Institute of Drug Abuse (NIDA)'s Intramural Research Program. In addition he is a board certified psychiatrist and medical director of the BeLite Medical Centers. His expertise is in studying the opioid system and the monoamine transporters as well as drugs acting on them, such as monoamine releasing agents. His brother is Nobel laureate James Rothman.
