= Psychotropic alkylamines =

Class of chemical compounds

Psychotropic alkylamines are alkylamines that share the critical property of not containing an aromatic nucleus, but are still biologically active. While many of these molecules are stimulants, others are antiviral, have competitive NMDA antagonist activity, or are nicotinic receptor antagonists.

Compound	Core	Other	N Substituent	Pharmacology
Neramexane	Cyclohexyl	1,3,3,5,5-Pentamethyl	1-NH2	NMDA receptor antagonist
Amantadine	adamantane	—	1-NH2	antiviral, NMDA antagonist, catecholamine releaser, cholinergic
Memantine	"	3,5-DiMe	"	NMDA antagonist
Rimantadine	"	CH3CH	NH2	antiviral
Cyclopentamine	cyclopentane	n-propyl	2-NHMe	Sympathomimetic vasoconstrictor
Propylhexedrine	cyclohexane	"	"	"
Methylhexanamine	n-hexane	4-methyl	2-NH2	"
Tuaminoheptane	n-heptane	—	2-NH2	"
Octodrine	"	6-methyl	"	"
Mecamylamine	norbornane	1-exo-2,2-trimethyl	1-endo-NHMe	nicotinic antagonist

== Alkenylamines ==
- Isometheptene

== Alkanolamines ==
- Heptaminol
