= TDMA (drug) =

MDMA analogue

Clinical data
- Other names: Thiadiazolylmethamphetamine; Thiadiazolyl-N-methylamphetamine
- Drug class: Serotonin–norepinephrine–dopamine releasing agent; Entactogen; Stimulant

Identifiers
- IUPAC name: 1-(2,1,3-benzothiadiazol-5-yl)-N-methylpropan-2-amine
- CAS Number: 2302389-87-1
- PubChem CID: 172641568

Chemical and physical data
- Formula: C_{10}H_{13}N_{3}S
- Molar mass: 207.30 g·mol^{−1}
- 3D model (JSmol): Interactive image
- SMILES: N1SN=C2C=CC(=CC=12)CC(C)N([H])C
- InChI: InChI=1S/C10H13N3S/c1-7(11-2)5-8-3-4-9-10(6-8)13-14-12-9/h3-4,6-7,11H,5H2,1-2H3; Key:VEEOETRMUTYYEO-UHFFFAOYSA-N

TDMA is a bioisosteric analogue of 3,4-methylenedioxy-N-methylamphetamine (MDMA) which was developed in an attempt to create an improved MDMA alternative for potential clinical use. It is the analogue of MDMA in which the 1,3-benzodioxole ring has been replaced with a 2,1,3-benzothiadiazole ring. ODMA and SeDMA are closely related analogues. ODMA, TDMA, and SeDMA are releasing agents of serotonin, norepinephrine, and dopamine similarly to MDMA. However, they are less potent and efficacious in activating the serotonin 5-HT_{2A}, 5-HT_{2B}, and 5-HT_{2C} receptors than MDMA and show differing and potentially improved metabolic and pharmacokinetic properties in comparison. ODMA, TDMA, and SeDMA were first described in the scientific literature in June 2024.

MDMA and 3,4-methylenedioxyamphetamine (MDA) are well-known serotonergic neurotoxins that damage serotonergic neurons in the brain. However, MDMA and MDA injected directly into the brain have been found to not produce serotonergic neurotoxicity in rodents. This suggests that peripherally formed metabolites of MDMA and MDA may be the actual mediators of the neurotoxicity rather than MDMA and MDA themselves. ODMA, TDMA, and SeDMA, with the exception of N-demethylation, do not share any of the phase I or phase II metabolic pathways of MDMA. Notably, in contrast to MDMA, methylenedioxy ring opening and consequent formation of catechol metabolites, which have been linked with free radical generation, does not occur. As a result, ODMA, TDMA, and SeDMA might not share the serotonergic neurotoxicity of MDMA and MDA. However, more research is needed to assess this possibility. Moreover, other studies have found that slow infusion of MDMA directly into the brain does produce signs of serotonergic neurotoxicity.

== See also ==
- Substituted methylenedioxyphenethylamine § Related compounds
- List of investigational hallucinogens and entactogens
- d2-MDMA
