= Tuaminoheptane =

Sympathomimetic agent

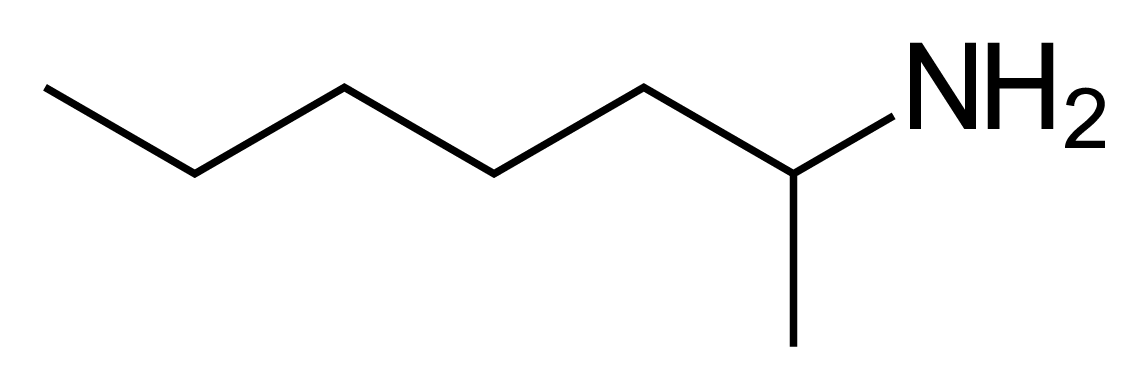

Clinical data
- Trade names: Heptin, Heptadrine, Tuamine
- Other names: Tuamine; 2-Aminoheptane; 2-Heptanamine; 1-Methylhexylamine
- ATC code: R01AA11 (WHO) R01AB08 (WHO) (combinations)

Identifiers
- IUPAC name: Heptan-2-amine
- CAS Number: 123-82-0 6240-90-0 ((R)-isomer) 44745-29-1 ((S)-isomer)
- PubChem CID: 5603
- ChemSpider: 5401
- UNII: Z0420GYD84
- KEGG: D07371
- ChEMBL: ChEMBL123693
- CompTox Dashboard (EPA): DTXSID6048468
- ECHA InfoCard: 100.004.233

Chemical and physical data
- Formula: C_{7}H_{17}N
- Molar mass: 115.220 g·mol^{−1}
- 3D model (JSmol): Interactive image
- Density: 0.766 g/mL g/cm^{3}
- SMILES: CCCCCC(C)N
- InChI: InChI=1S/C7H17N/c1-3-4-5-6-7(2)8/h7H,3-6,8H2,1-2H3; Key:VSRBKQFNFZQRBM-UHFFFAOYSA-N

Tuaminoheptane (INN, BAN; brand names Heptin, Heptadrine, Tuamine; also known as tuamine and 2-aminoheptane) is a sympathomimetic agent and vasoconstrictor which is used as a nasal decongestant. It has also been used as a stimulant.

Tuaminoheptane has been found to act as a reuptake inhibitor and releasing agent of norepinephrine, which may underlie its decongestant and stimulant effects. It is an alkylamine. The chemical structure of the drug differs from that of other norepinephrine releasing agents, such as the phenethylamines, which, in contrast to tuaminoheptane, have an aromatic ring in their structure.

Tuaminoheptane is on the 2011 list of prohibited substances published by the World Anti-Doping Agency.

== See also ==
- 1,3-Dimethylbutylamine
- 1,4-Dimethylamylamine
- Heptaminol
- Iproheptine
- Isometheptene
- Methylhexanamine
- Octodrine
- Oenethyl
