= 2-Benzylpiperidine =

Chemical compound

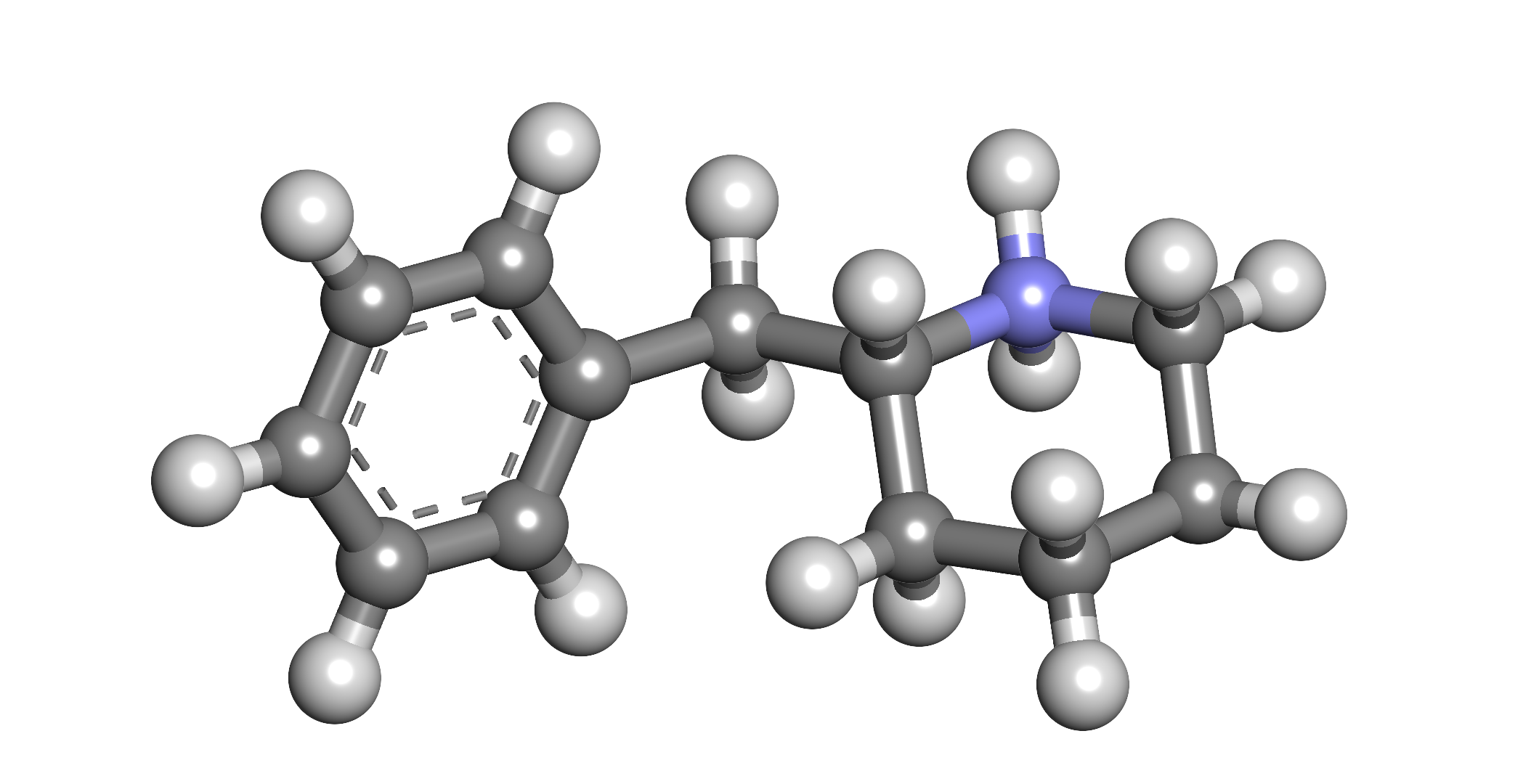

Clinical data
- Routes of administration: Oral
- Drug class: Dopamine reuptake inhibitor
- ATC code: none

Legal status
- Legal status: In general: uncontrolled

Identifiers
- IUPAC name: 2-benzylpiperidine
- CAS Number: 32838-55-4
- PubChem CID: 118004
- ChemSpider: 105447
- UNII: 8M5DNQ89DJ
- CompTox Dashboard (EPA): DTXSID40871372
- ECHA InfoCard: 100.046.581

Chemical and physical data
- Formula: C_{12}H_{17}N
- Molar mass: 175.275 g·mol^{−1}
- 3D model (JSmol): Interactive image
- SMILES: C1CCNC(C1)CC2=CC=CC=C2
- InChI: InChI=1S/C12H17N/c1-2-6-11(7-3-1)10-12-8-4-5-9-13-12/h1-3,6-7,12-13H,4-5,8-10H2; Key:ITXCORRITGNIHP-UHFFFAOYSA-N

2-Benzylpiperidine is a stimulant drug of the arylpiperidine family. It is similar in structure to certain other stimulants such as methylphenidate and desoxypipradrol. However, it is far less potent as a monoamine reuptake inhibitor in comparison. The drug is little used as a stimulant, with its main use being as a synthetic intermediate in the manufacture of other drugs.

== Pharmacology ==
The affinity (K_{i}) of 2-benzylpiperidine for the dopamine transporter (DAT) has been reported to be 6,360 nM and its functional inhibition (IC_{50}) of the DAT has been reported to be 3,780 to 8,800 nM. These values were 85-fold and 53- to 38-fold lower than those of methylphenidate, respectively. It produced 36% inhibition of binding to the norepinephrine transporter (NET) and 22% inhibition of binding to the serotonin transporter (SERT) at a concentration of 10,000 nM. However, 2-phenylpiperidine might have actually been assayed by mistake in one of the two studies that reported the preceding values, and so some of the values might be incorrect. In another older study, 2-benzylpiperidine was reported to be similarly potent to dextroamphetamine in terms of norepinephrine reuptake inhibition.

== Analogues and derivatives ==
Derivatives of 2-benzylpiperidine, such as the cathinone-like derivative α-keto-2-benzylpiperidine and its 4-methyl, 4-halo, and 3,4-dichloro analogues, have been synthesized and have been found to be much more potent as dopamine reuptake inhibitors. Another analogue of 2-benzylpiperidine, 3-phenylpiperidine, is also more potent as a monoamine reuptake inhibitor in comparison, with higher affinities for the monoamine transporters and ~8-fold higher functional inhibition of the DAT.

== See also ==
- 4-Benzylpiperidine
- 1-Benzylpiperazine
