= Isometheptene =

Sympathomimetic amine

Clinical data
- AHFS/Drugs.com: International Drug Names
- MedlinePlus: a601064
- Routes of administration: Oral
- ATC code: A03AX10 (WHO)

Identifiers
- IUPAC name: N,6-Dimethylhept-5-en-2-amine
- CAS Number: 503-01-5
- PubChem CID: 22297
- DrugBank: DB06706
- ChemSpider: 21106328
- UNII: Y7L24THH6T
- CompTox Dashboard (EPA): DTXSID9023172
- ECHA InfoCard: 100.007.236

Chemical and physical data
- Formula: C_{9}H_{19}N
- Molar mass: 141.258 g·mol^{−1}
- 3D model (JSmol): Interactive image
- SMILES: CNC(C)CCC=C(C)C
- InChI: InChI=1S/C9H19N/c1-8(2)6-5-7-9(3)10-4/h6,9-10H,5,7H2,1-4H3; Key:XVQUOJBERHHONY-UHFFFAOYSA-N

Isometheptene (usually as isometheptene mucate) is a sympathomimetic amine sometimes used in the treatment of migraines and tension headaches due to its vasoconstricting properties; that is, it causes constriction (narrowing) of blood vessels (arteries and veins).

== Mechanism of action ==
Isometheptene's vasoconstricting properties arise through activation of the sympathetic nervous system via epinephrine and norepinephrine. These compounds elicit smooth muscle activation leading to vasoconstriction by interacting with cell surface adrenergic receptors.

== See also ==
- 1,3-Dimethylbutylamine
- 1,4-Dimethylamylamine
- Heptaminol
- Iproheptine – Chemical compound
- Methylhexanamine – Chemical compound
- Octodrine – DMAA substitute
- Oenethyl
- Tuaminoheptane – Sympathomimetic agent
