= 4-Benzylpiperidine =

Chemical compound

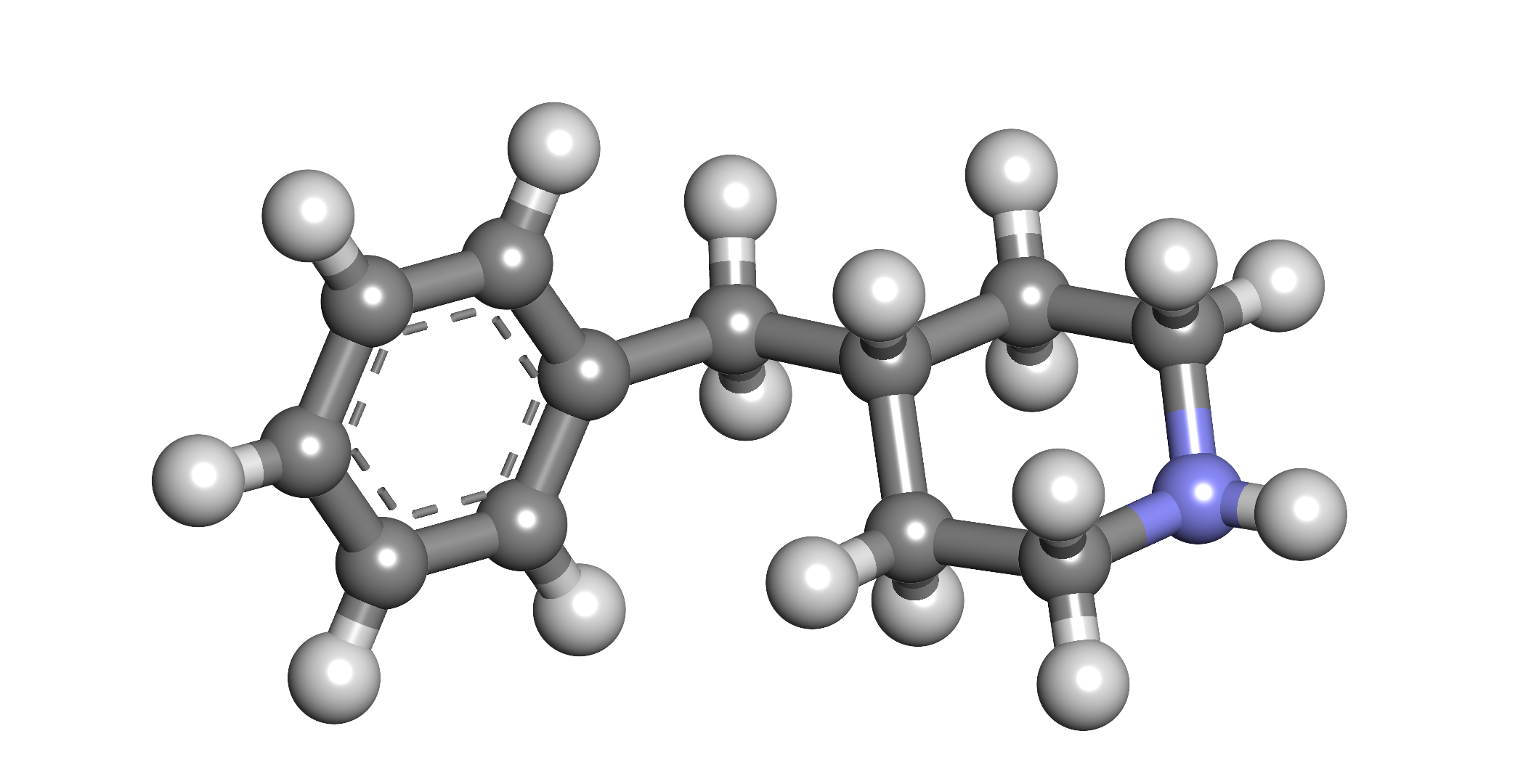

Legal status
- Legal status: DE: The NpSG do not apply to this substance, because it is not a 2-Phenylethylamine derivative; UK: Under Psychoactive Substances Act

Identifiers
- IUPAC name: 4-(phenylmethyl)piperidine
- CAS Number: 31252-42-3
- PubChem CID: 31738
- ChemSpider: 29432
- UNII: JDF1T4667S
- ChEMBL: ChEMBL144129
- CompTox Dashboard (EPA): DTXSID3067603
- ECHA InfoCard: 100.045.926

Chemical and physical data
- Formula: C_{12}H_{17}N
- Molar mass: 175.275 g·mol^{−1}
- 3D model (JSmol): Interactive image
- SMILES: C1CNCCC1CC2=CC=CC=C2
- InChI: InChI=1S/C12H17N/c1-2-4-11(5-3-1)10-12-6-8-13-9-7-12/h1-5,12-13H,6-10H2; Key:ABGXADJDTPFFSZ-UHFFFAOYSA-N

4-Benzylpiperidine is a drug and research chemical used in scientific studies. It has been encountered as a designer drug.

== Pharmacology ==
4-Benzylpiperidine acts as a monoamine releasing agent with 20- to 48-fold selectivity for releasing dopamine versus serotonin. It is most efficacious as a releaser of norepinephrine, with an EC_{50} of 109 nM (DA), 41.4 nM (NE), and 5,246 nM (5-HT).

It also functions as a weak monoamine oxidase inhibitor (MAOI) (IC_{50} = 130 μM for MAO-A and 750 μM for MAO-B).

The drug has a fast onset of action and a short duration.

== Synthesis ==
4-Cyanopyridine can be reacted with toluene to give 4-benzylpyridine. Catalytic hydrogenation of the pyridine ring then completes the synthesis.

== Applications ==
RMI-10608 is a derivative of 4-benzylpiperidine and analog of haloperidol that was discovered to have potential use in treating psychosis and preventing brain damage by virtue of its NMDA antagonist pharmacology.

== See also ==
- 2-Benzylpiperidine
- Benzylpiperazine
- Tetrahydroisoquinoline
