= Heptaminol =

Names
- IUPAC name (RS)-6-Amino-2-methylheptan-2-ol

Identifiers
CAS Number	372-66-7
3D model (JSmol)	Interactive image
ChEBI	CHEBI:94362
ChEMBL	ChEMBL2111076
ChemSpider	3464
DrugBank	DB13574
ECHA InfoCard	100.006.144
EC Number	206-758-0
MeSH	Heptaminol
PubChem CID	3590
UNII	3DQS188SY5
CompTox Dashboard (EPA)	DTXSID4048484
- InChI: InChI=1S/C8H19NO/c1-7(9)5-4-6-8(2,3)10/h7,10H,4-6,9H2,1-3H3 Key: LREQLEBVOXIEOM-UHFFFAOYSA-N; InChI=1/C8H19NO/c1-7(9)5-4-6-8(2,3)10/h7,10H,4-6,9H2,1-3H3 Key: LREQLEBVOXIEOM-UHFFFAOYAN
- SMILES: OC(C)(C)CCCC(N)C

Properties
Chemical formula	C_{8}H_{19}NO
Molar mass	145.246 g·mol^{−1}
Density	0.895 g/mL
Boiling point	250 °C (482 °F; 523 K)

Pharmacology
ATC code	C01DX08 (WHO)
Routes of administration	Oral, intravenous, intramuscular
- Pharmacokinetics
Excretion	Renal

Hazards
- Occupational safety and health (OHS/OSH)
Main hazards	Corrosive
- GHS labelling
Pictograms	(GHS05: Corrosive) (GHS07: Exclamation mark)
Signal word	Danger
Hazard statements	H314, H315, H319, H335
Precautionary statements	P260, P264, P271, P280, P301+P330+P331, P302+P352, P303+P361+P353, P304+P340, P305+P351+P338, P310, P312, P321, P332+P313, P337+P313, P362, P363, P403+P233, P405, P501
Flash point	105 °C (221 °F; 378 K)
- Except where otherwise noted, data are given for materials in their standard state (at 25 °C [77 °F], 100 kPa). verify (what is ?) Infobox references

Heptaminol is an amino alcohol which is classified as a cardiac stimulant (positive inotropic action). It also increases coronary blood flow along with mild peripheral vasoconstriction. It is sometimes used in the treatment of low blood pressure, particularly orthostatic hypotension as it is a potent positive inotrope (improving cardiac contraction).

== Use in doping ==
Heptaminol is classified by the World Anti-Doping Agency as a doping substance. In 2008, the cyclist Dmitriy Fofonov tested positive for heptaminol at the Tour de France. In June 2010, the swimmer Frédérick Bousquet tested positive. In 2013, the cyclist Sylvain Georges tested positive at the Giro d'Italia. In 2014, baseball player Joel Piniero tested positive as well as St. Louis Cardinals minor league baseball player Yeison Medina.

On March 22, 2019, Cycling South Africa reported that Ricardo Broxham has been sanctioned for an anti-doping rule violation of Articles 2.1 and 2.2 of the UCI Anti-Doping Rules after an in-competition test conducted on 18 August 2018 confirmed the presence of heptaminol in his sample.

The UCI Anti-Doping Tribunal has imposed a period of ineligibility of 12 months for the violation, applicable as of 22 September 2018 up to and including 22 September 2019 and a disqualification of all results from the 2018 UCI Junior Track Cycling World Championships.

== See also ==
- 1,3-Dimethylbutylamine
- 1,4-Dimethylamylamine
- Iproheptine
- Isometheptene
- Methylhexanamine
- Octodrine
- Oenethyl
- Tuaminoheptane
