= Phenylpropylamine =

Clinical data
- Other names: 3-Phenyl-1-propylamine
- Drug class: Norepinephrine–dopamine releasing agent

Identifiers
- IUPAC name: 3-phenylpropan-1-amine
- CAS Number: 2038-57-5
- PubChem CID: 16259
- DrugBank: DB04410
- ChemSpider: 15427
- UNII: P8326EZ31P
- ChEBI: CHEBI:45017
- ChEMBL: ChEMBL276864
- CompTox Dashboard (EPA): DTXSID10174307
- ECHA InfoCard: 100.016.376

Chemical and physical data
- Formula: C_{9}H_{13}N
- Molar mass: 135.210 g·mol^{−1}
- 3D model (JSmol): Interactive image
- SMILES: C1=CC=C(C=C1)CCCN
- InChI: InChI=1S/C9H13N/c10-8-4-7-9-5-2-1-3-6-9/h1-3,5-6H,4,7-8,10H2; Key:LYUQWQRTDLVQGA-UHFFFAOYSA-N

Phenylpropylamine, also known as 3-phenylpropylamine, is a monoamine releasing agent (MRA) related to phenethylamine (2-phenylethylamine). It is the analogue of phenethylamine in which the ethylamine side chain has been lengthened by one carbon atom to instead be a propylamine chain.

Phenylpropylamine was synthesized and characterized during investigations of the structure–activity relationships (SAR) of phenethylamine and amphetamine MRAs. It acts as a norepinephrine–dopamine releasing agent (NDRA). However, phenylpropylamine is dramatically less potent than phenethylamine as an NDRA in rat brain synaptosomes in vitro and shows ~7-fold preference for induction of norepinephrine release over dopamine release.

The analogue of phenethylamine with the ethylamine side chain shortened by one carbon atom to instead be a methylamine chain is benzylamine (phenylmethylamine). In contrast to phenethylamine and phenylpropylamine, benzylamine is said to be inactive as a norepinephrine releasing agent (NRA). However, certain derivatives of benzylamine have nonetheless been found to show MRA-like effects in animals. In addition, benzylpiperazine, an analogue of benzylamine with a methylamine-like side chain, is a potent MRA and psychostimulant.

Monoamine release of phenylpropylamine and related agents (EC_{50}, nM)
| Compound | NE | DA | 5-HT | Ref |
|---|---|---|---|---|
| Phenethylamine (2-phenylethylamine) | 10.9 | 39.5 | >10,000 | |
| Phenylpropylamine (3-phenylpropylamine) | 222 | 1,491 | ND | |
| β-Methylphenethylamine (2-phenylpropylamine) | 126 | 627 | ND | |
| Dextroamphetamine (d-phenylisopropylamine) | 6.6–7.2 | 5.8–24.8 | 698–1,765 | |
Notes: The smaller the value, the more strongly the drug releases the neurotransmitter. The assays were done in rat brain synaptosomes and human potencies may be different. See also Monoamine releasing agent § Activity profiles for a larger table with more compounds. Refs:

== See also ==
- Homo-MDA
- Homo-MDMA
