= 7-AB =

Clinical data
- Other names: 6,7,8,9-Tetrahydro-5H-benzocyclohepten-7-ylamine
- ATC code: None

Identifiers
- IUPAC name: 6,7,8,9-tetrahydro-5H-benzo[7]annulen-7-amine
- CAS Number: 450-60-2
- PubChem CID: 11789519
- ChemSpider: 9964193

Chemical and physical data
- Formula: C_{11}H_{15}N
- Molar mass: 161.248 g·mol^{−1}
- 3D model (JSmol): Interactive image
- SMILES: C1CC2=CC=CC=C2CCC1N
- InChI: InChI=1S/C11H15N/c12-11-7-5-9-3-1-2-4-10(9)6-8-11/h1-4,11H,5-8,12H2; Key:BGKVEHAWZXNHBI-UHFFFAOYSA-N

7-AB, also known as 7-amino-6,7,8,9-tetrahydro-5H-benzocycloheptene, is a conformationally restricted analogue of amphetamine related to 2-aminoindane (2-AI) and 2-aminotetralin (2-AT). Unlike amphetamine, 2-AI, and 2-AT, 7-AB did not produce stimulant-type effects in animals. Instead, it caused behavioral disruption and death at higher doses. 6-AB is a positional isomer of 7-AB.

== See also ==
- 2-Amino-1,2-dihydronaphthalene (2-ADN)
- 1-Phenylpiperazine (1-PP)
- Lorcaserin
