= 6-AB =

Clinical data
- Other names: 6-Amino-6,7,8,9-tetrahydro-5H-benzocycloheptene
- ATC code: None

Identifiers
- IUPAC name: 6,7,8,9-tetrahydro-5H-benzo[7]annulen-6-amine
- CAS Number: 57559-72-5
- PubChem CID: 41896
- ChemSpider: 38228
- ChEMBL: ChEMBL1190678

Chemical and physical data
- Formula: C_{11}H_{15}N
- Molar mass: 161.248 g·mol^{−1}
- 3D model (JSmol): Interactive image
- SMILES: C1CC(CC2=CC=CC=C2C1)N
- InChI: InChI=1S/C11H15N/c12-11-7-3-6-9-4-1-2-5-10(9)8-11/h1-2,4-5,11H,3,6-8,12H2; Key:MDVRGZASGHPBAG-UHFFFAOYSA-N

6-AB, also known as 6-amino-6,7,8,9-tetrahydro-5H-benzocycloheptene, is a conformationally restricted analogue of amphetamine related to 2-aminoindane (2-AI) and 2-aminotetralin (2-AT). Unlike amphetamine, 2-AI, and 2-AT, 6-AB did not produce stimulant-type effects in animals. In another study, it produced a biphasic effect at high doses, with initial hypolocomotion followed after a few hours by weak locomotor stimulation. 7-AB is a positional isomer of 6-AB.

== See also ==
- TFMBOX
- 2-Amino-1,2-dihydronaphthalene (2-ADN)
- 1-Phenylpiperazine (1-PP)
