= 2-Amino-1,2-dihydronaphthalene =

Chemical compound

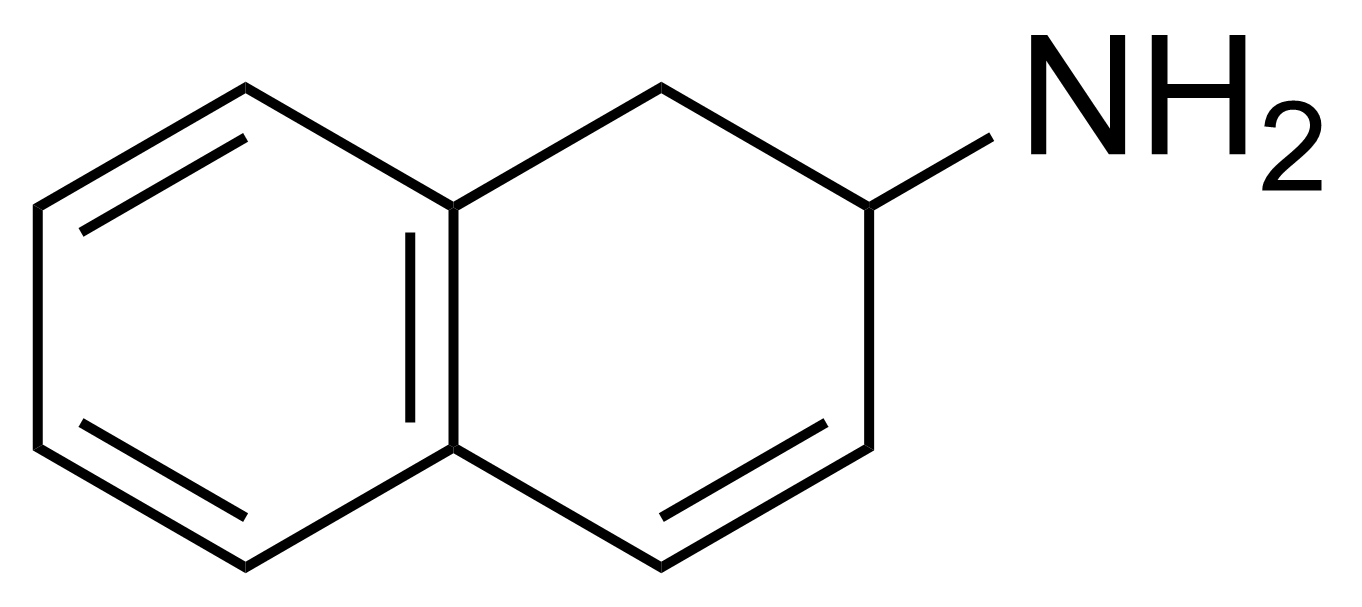

Clinical data
- Other names: 2-ADN; ADN
- Routes of administration: Oral
- ATC code: none

Legal status
- Legal status: In general: uncontrolled

Identifiers
- IUPAC name: 1,2-dihydronaphthalen-2-amine
- CAS Number: 79605-60-0
- PubChem CID: 133605
- ChemSpider: 117856
- UNII: VGU4389G8H
- CompTox Dashboard (EPA): DTXSID501001767

Chemical and physical data
- Formula: C_{10}H_{11}N
- Molar mass: 145.205 g·mol^{−1}
- 3D model (JSmol): Interactive image
- SMILES: c2ccc1c(\C=C/C(N)C1)c2
- InChI: InChI=1S/C10H11N/c11-10-6-5-8-3-1-2-4-9(8)7-10/h1-6,10H,7,11H2; Key:SHLZSYAMFQNEOF-UHFFFAOYSA-N

2-Amino-1,2-dihydronapthalene (2-ADN or ADN) is a stimulant drug. It is a rigid analogue of phenylisobutylamine and substitutes for amphetamine in rat drug discrimination tests, although at approximately one-fourth the potency.

The drug is closely related to 2-aminotetralin (2-AT; 2-amino-1,2,3,4-tetrahydronaphthalene), which also substitutes for amphetamine, and is about twice as potent as 2-AT in substituting for amphetamine. Other homologous and rigid analogues of amphetamine besides 2-ADN and 2-AT include 2-aminoindane (2-AI), 1-naphthylaminopropane (1-NAP), 2-naphthylaminopropane (2-NAP), 1-phenylpiperazine (1-PP), 6-AB, and 7-AB.

== See also ==
- 2-Naphthylamine
