= Octodrine =

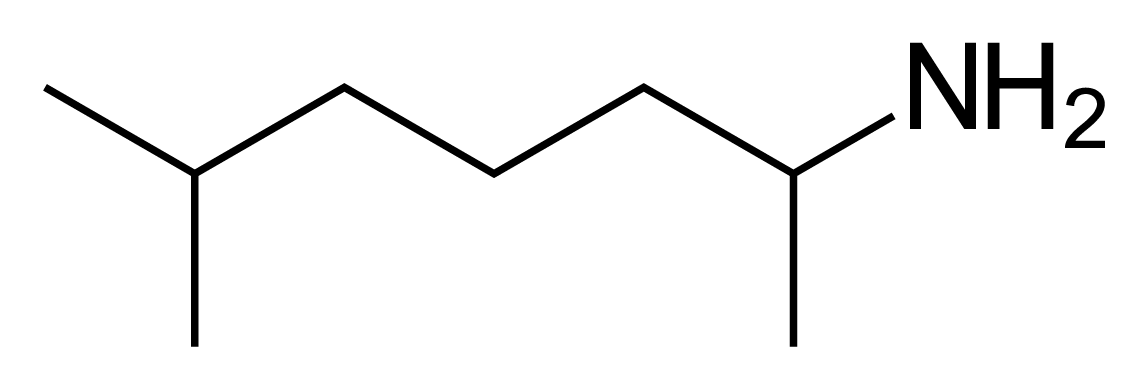

Clinical data
- Other names: Dimethylhexylamine; DMHA; Ottodrina; Vaporpac; Amidrine; 2-Aminoisooctane;2-aminoisoheptane; 2-Amino-6-methylheptane; 1,5-Dimethylhexylamine; 6-Methyl-2-heptylamine; 6-Methyl-2-heptanamine; Isoctaminium; SKF-51; SK&F-51; NSC-759813
- Routes of administration: Oral, inhaled
- ATC code: none

Legal status
- Legal status: US: Unapproved drug; use in dietary supplements, food, or medicine is unlawful.

Pharmacokinetic data
- Metabolism: Hydroxylation
- Metabolites: Heptaminol

Identifiers
- IUPAC name: 6-methylheptan-2-amine
- CAS Number: 543-82-8
- PubChem CID: 10982
- DrugBank: DB19374
- ChemSpider: 10517
- UNII: 3GQ9E911BI
- CompTox Dashboard (EPA): DTXSID8046535
- ECHA InfoCard: 100.008.047

Chemical and physical data
- Formula: C_{8}H_{19}N
- Molar mass: 129.247 g·mol^{−1}
- 3D model (JSmol): Interactive image
- SMILES: CC(C)CCCC(C)N
- InChI: InChI=1S/C8H19N/c1-7(2)5-4-6-8(3)9/h7-8H,4-6,9H2,1-3H3; Key:QNIVIMYXGGFTAK-UHFFFAOYSA-N

Octodrine, also known as dimethylhexylamine (DMHA) and sold under the brand name Vaporpac among others, is a sympathomimetic and stimulant medication that was formerly used in the treatment of hypotension (low blood pressure).

It has been studied in a dozen animal studies from the 1940s through the 1970s. These studies found that octodrine can increase blood pressure and cardiac output in animals. The drug was previously approved for use by the Food and Drug Administration (FDA) as an inhalant (i.e., Vaporpac and Tickle Tackle Inhaler) and in Germany as an oral medication as part of a multi-component medication (i.e., Ambredin and Ordinal), but is no longer available.

DMHA has also been found as an adulterant in preworkout products and is also sold online as a designer drug. The presence of a reductive amination byproduct in seized samples confirms the drug is fully synthetic in origin.

In the United States, the FDA considers DMHA to be an unsafe ingredient in dietary supplements. In 2019, the FDA issued nine warning letters to US manufacturers of dietary supplements containing DMHA as an unsafe food additive, deeming such products to be adulterated and illegal for marketing.

== Side effects ==
Reported side effects of octodrine include hypertension, dyspnea, and hyperthermia.

== Pharmacology ==
It is described as a sympathomimetic, vasoconstrictor, and local anesthetic.

=== Pharmacokinetics ===
Heptaminol is the likely active metabolite of octodrine.

== Chemistry ==
=== Related compounds ===
- Isometheptene
- Methylhexanamine (1,3-DMAA)
- Tuaminoheptane
- 1,3-Dimethylbutylamine (DMBA)
- 1,4-Dimethylamylamine (1,4-DMAA)
- Iproheptine (N-isopropyloctodrine)
- Heptaminol (hydroxyoctodrine)
- Oenethyl

== Society and culture ==
=== Names ===
Octodrine is the generic name of the drug and its INN and USAN. It is also known by its former developmental code name SKF-51.

=== As an unsafe dietary ingredient ===
In the United States, DMHA is not eligible for use as a dietary ingredient, is not approved for use in manufactured foods or dietary supplements, and is not considered to be safe for human consumption (is not GRAS); in regarding DMHA as an unsafe food additive, the FDA has warned manufacturers that dietary supplements containing DMHA are adulterated and illegal for marketing.
