= 1,4-Dimethylamylamine =

Clinical data
- Other names: 2-Amino-5-methylhexane; 1,4-Dimethylpentylamine
- Drug class: Stimulant; Sympathomimetic; Monoamine releasing agent

Identifiers
- IUPAC name: 5-methylhexan-2-amine
- CAS Number: 28292-43-5
- PubChem CID: 34204
- ChemSpider: 31520
- UNII: RJ36ZF28PW
- CompTox Dashboard (EPA): DTXSID60885416
- ECHA InfoCard: 100.044.477

Chemical and physical data
- Formula: C_{7}H_{17}N
- Molar mass: 115.220 g·mol^{−1}
- 3D model (JSmol): Interactive image
- SMILES: CC(C)CCC(C)N
- InChI: InChI=1S/C7H17N/c1-6(2)4-5-7(3)8/h6-7H,4-5,8H2,1-3H3; Key:IZCBXLKODYZSDJ-UHFFFAOYSA-N

1,4-Dimethylamylamine (1,4-DMAA), also known as 1,4-dimethylpentylamine or as 5-methylhexan-2-amine, is a stimulant drug of the alkylamine family related to methylhexanamine (1,3-DMAA; geranamine). It is naturally present in geranium plants and has also been found in certain other plants.

1,4-DMAA has been identified in dietary supplements. It produces sympathomimetic effects in animals and humans. 1,4-DMAA and other alkylamine stimulants may act as catecholamine releasing agents. Unlike octodrine and methylhexanamine, 1,4-DMAA has never been used as a pharmaceutical drug.
