= C12H17NO =

The molecular formula C_{12}H_{17}NO may refer to:

- DEET
- 1-Aminomethyl-6-methoxytetralin
- 3,4-Dimethylmethcathinone
- 4-Methyl-N,N-dimethylcathinone
- N-Ethylbuphedrone
- 4-Ethylmethcathinone
- G-130
- IBF5MAP
- Indanorex
- 5-MAPDB
- 6-MAPDB
- 4-Methylbuphedrone
- 4-Methylethcathinone
- Pentedrone
- Phendimetrazine
- Propylcathinone
- 2-Phenyl-3,6-dimethylmorpholine
