= Naphthylmorpholine =

Clinical data
- Other names: PAL-678; PAL678; 2-(2′-Naphthyl)morpholine; 2-(Naphthalen-2-yl)morpholine
- Drug class: Monoamine releasing agent

Identifiers
- IUPAC name: 2-naphthalen-2-ylmorpholine
- CAS Number: 1097796-91-2
- PubChem CID: 43350792
- ChemSpider: 38116416

Chemical and physical data
- Formula: C_{14}H_{15}NO
- Molar mass: 213.280 g·mol^{−1}
- 3D model (JSmol): Interactive image
- SMILES: C1COC(CN1)C2=CC3=CC=CC=C3C=C2
- InChI: InChI=1S/C14H15NO/c1-2-4-12-9-13(6-5-11(12)3-1)14-10-15-7-8-16-14/h1-6,9,14-15H,7-8,10H2; Key:AQOVYDDILDIECZ-UHFFFAOYSA-N

Naphthylmorpholine (code name PAL-678), also known as 2-(2′-naphthyl)morpholine, is a monoamine releasing agent of the arylmorpholine and naphthylethylamine families. It is the derivative of 2-phenylmorpholine with a 2-naphthalene ring instead of a phenyl ring. Naphthylmorpholine is a close analogue of naphthylmetrazine (PAL-704; a naphthalene analogue of phenmetrazine), but lacks naphthylmetrazine's methyl group at the 3 position of the morpholine ring.

The drug is a potent monoamine releasing agent. Its EC_{50} values for induction of monoamine release have not been reported, but it released 92% of serotonin, 88% of norepinephrine, and 79% of dopamine at a concentration of 10,000 nM in rat brain synaptosomes. Hence, it appears to act preferentially as a releaser of serotonin and norepinephrine and to a lesser extent of dopamine.

Monoamine release of naphthylmorpholine and related agents (EC_{50}, nM)
Compound	NE	DA	5-HT	Ref
d-Amphetamine	6.6–10.2	5.8–24.8	698–1,765	
Naphthylaminopropane (NAP; PAL-287)	11.1	12.6	3.4	
d-Methamphetamine	12.3–14.3	8.5–40.4	736–1,292	
Methylnaphthylaminopropane (MNAP; PAL-1046)	34	10	13	
l-Methcathinone	13.1	14.8	1,772	
2-Naphthylmethcathinone (BMAPN; βk-MNAP)	94% at 10 μM	34	27	
d-Ethylamphetamine	28.8	44.1	333.0	
Ethylnaphthylaminopropane (ENAP; PAL-1045)	137	46 ^{a}	12 ^{a}	
2-Phenylmorpholine (PAL-632)	79	86	20,260	
Naphthylmorpholine (PAL-678)	88% at 10 μM	79% at 10 μM	92% at 10 μM	
Phenmetrazine	29–50.4	70–131	7,765–>10,000	
Naphthylmetrazine (PAL-704)	203	111	RI (105)	
Notes: The smaller the value, the more strongly the drug releases the neurotransmitter. The assays were done in rat brain synaptosomes and human potencies may be different. See also Monoamine releasing agent § Activity profiles for a larger table with more compounds. Footnotes: ^{a} ENAP is a partial releaser of serotonin (E_{max} = 66%) and dopamine (E_{max} = 78%). Refs:
