= 3-Chlorophenmetrazine =

Chemical compound

Clinical data
- Other names: 3-CPM; PAL-594; PAL594

Identifiers
- IUPAC name: 3-methyl-2-(3-chlorophenyl)morpholine
- CAS Number: 1097796-78-5
- PubChem CID: 43350791
- ChemSpider: 27935393
- UNII: B6P88Q2VW5
- CompTox Dashboard (EPA): DTXSID701337061

Chemical and physical data
- Formula: C_{11}H_{14}ClNO
- Molar mass: 211.69 g·mol^{−1}
- 3D model (JSmol): Interactive image
- SMILES: CC1C(OCCN1)C2=CC(=CC=C2)Cl
- InChI: InChI=1S/C11H14ClNO/c1-8-11(14-6-5-13-8)9-3-2-4-10(12)7-9/h2-4,7-8,11,13H,5-6H2,1H3; Key:BOFUZZAQNVYZFF-UHFFFAOYSA-N

3-Chlorophenmetrazine (3-CPM; code name PAL-594) is a recreational designer drug with stimulant effects. It is a substituted phenylmorpholine derivative, closely related to better known drugs such as phenmetrazine and 3-fluorophenmetrazine (3-FPM; PAL-593).

The drug has been shown to act as a norepinephrine–dopamine releasing agent (NDRA) with additional weak serotonin release. Its EC_{50} values for induction of monoamine release are 27 nM for dopamine, 75 nM for norepinephrine, and 301 nM for serotonin in rat brain synaptosomes. Hence, it releases dopamine about 3-fold more potently than norepinephrine and about 11-fold more potently than serotonin.

Similarly to cis-4-methylaminorex, the drug is notable in being one of the most selective dopamine releasing agents (DRAs) known, although it still has substantial capacity to release norepinephrine.

== See also ==
- 3-Bromomethylphenidate
- 3-Chloromethamphetamine
- 3-Chloromethcathinone
- 4-Methylphenmetrazine
- G-130
- Methylenedioxyphenmetrazine
- Phendimetrazine
- PDM-35
- Radafaxine
