= Substituted naphthylethylamine =

Class of chemical compounds

2-Naphthylaminopropane, one of the more well-known naphthylethylamines.

1-Naphthylaminopropane, a lesser-known naphthylethylamine.

The substituted naphthylethylamines are a class of chemical compounds based on naphthalene. Many naphthylethylamines are naphthylaminopropanes (also known as naphthylisopropylamines) due to the presence of a methyl group at the alpha carbon of the alkyl chain. The naphthylethylamines are derivatives of the phenethylamines, while the naphthylaminopropanes are derivatives of the amphetamines.

There are two types of naphthylethylamines based on positional isomerism: 1-naphthylethylamines and 2-naphthylethylamines. Examples of these include 1-naphthylaminopropane (1-NAP) and 2-naphthylaminopropane (2-NAP), respectively.

== List of substituted naphthylethylamines ==
The substituted napthylethylamines include the following compounds:

- 1-Naphthylaminopropane (1-NAP; α-NAP)
- 2-Naphthylaminopropane (2-NAP; β-NAP; NAP; naphthylisopropylamine; PAL-287)
- Methylnaphthylaminopropane (MNAP; methamnetamine; PAL-1046)
- Ethylnaphthylaminopropane (ENAP; PAL-1045)
- Naphthylpropylaminopentane (NPAP)
- 1-Naphthylmethcathinone (AMAPN)
- 2-Naphthylmethcathinone (BMAPN; βk-MNAP)
- Agomelatine (7-methoxy-N-acetyl-1-naphthylethylamine)
- Napactadine (DL-588)
- PRC200-SS
- Pronethalol (β-hydroxy-N-isopropyl-2-naphthylethylamine)
- Naphthylmorpholine (PAL-678)
- Naphthylmetrazine (PAL-704)
- Naphyrone ("naphthylpyrovalerone")
- Methylnaphthidate (HDMP-28; "naphthylmethylphenidate")
- Ethylnaphthidate (HDEP-28; "naphthylethylphenidate")
- G-N (1,4-dimethoxynaphthyl-2-isopropylamine)
- 2C-G-N (1,4-dimethoxynaphthyl-2-ethylamine)

Additional naphthylethylamines include 4-NEMD, centanafadine (EB-1020), nafimidone, naphazoline, and xaliproden (SR-57746). Some synthetic cannabinoids such as THJ-018 and THJ-2201 are also naphthylethylamines.

=== Related compounds ===
Some related compounds that are not technically naphthylethylamines include 1-naphthylpiperazine and its derivatives like CSP-2503, F-11,461, S-14506, and S-14671. Another related compound is 2-naphthylpiperazine. DMNPC is a 2-naphthylpiperidine.

== Pharmacology ==
Many naphthylethylamines, like 2-naphthylaminopropane and derivatives, act as monoamine releasing agents (MRAs), monoamine reuptake inhibitors (MRIs), and/or monoamine receptor modulators. Naphthylpropylaminopentane (NPAP) is a monoaminergic activity enhancer (MAE). Some, such as 2-naphthylaminopropane and to a lesser extent 1-naphthylaminopropane, but not others, such as NPAP, are also variably potent monoamine oxidase inhibitors (MAOIs).

Monoamine release of naphthylethylamines (EC_{50}, nM)
Compound	NE	DA	5-HT	Ref
d-Amphetamine	6.6–10.2	5.8–24.8	698–1,765	
1-Naphthylaminopropane	ND	ND	ND	ND
2-Naphthylaminopropane (NAP; PAL-287)	11.1	12.6	3.4	
d-Methamphetamine	12.3–14.3	8.5–40.4	736–1,292	
Methylnaphthylaminopropane (MNAP; PAL-1046)	34	10	13	
l-Methcathinone	13.1	14.8	1,772	
1-Naphthylmethcathinone (AMAPN)	92% at 10 μM	55	21	
2-Naphthylmethcathinone (BMAPN; βk-MNAP)	94% at 10 μM	34	27	
d-Ethylamphetamine	28.8	44.1	333.0	
Ethylnaphthylaminopropane (ENAP; PAL-1045)	137	46 ^{a}	12 ^{a}	
2-Phenylmorpholine (PAL-632)	79	86	20,260	
Naphthylmorpholine (PAL-678)	88% at 10 μM	79% at 10 μM	92% at 10 μM	
Phenmetrazine	29–50.4	70–131	7,765–>10,000	
Naphthylmetrazine (PAL-704)	203	111	RI (105)	
Notes: The smaller the value, the more strongly the drug releases the neurotransmitter. The assays were done in rat brain synaptosomes and human potencies may be different. See also Monoamine releasing agent § Activity profiles for a larger table with more compounds. Footnotes: ^{a} ENAP is a partial releaser of serotonin (E_{max} = 66%) and dopamine (E_{max} = 78%). Refs:

== See also ==
- Substituted phenethylamine
- Substituted amphetamine
- Substituted cathinone
- Substituted methylenedioxyphenethylamine
- Substituted benzofuran
- Substituted 2-aminoindane
- Substituted tryptamine
