= Naphthylmetrazine =

Clinical data
- Other names: PAL-704; PAL704; 3-Methyl-2-(2′-naphthyl)morpholine
- Drug class: Norepinephrine–dopamine releasing agent; Serotonin reuptake inhibitor

Identifiers
- IUPAC name: 3-methyl-2-naphthalen-2-ylmorpholine
- CAS Number: 1350769-57-1
- PubChem CID: 54673725

Chemical and physical data
- Formula: C_{15}H_{17}NO
- Molar mass: 227.307 g·mol^{−1}
- 3D model (JSmol): Interactive image
- SMILES: CC1C(OCCN1)C2=CC3=CC=CC=C3C=C2
- InChI: InChI=1S/C15H17NO/c1-11-15(17-9-8-16-11)14-7-6-12-4-2-3-5-13(12)10-14/h2-7,10-11,15-16H,8-9H2,1H3; Key:SYFNRUAPFPQZQA-UHFFFAOYSA-N

Naphthylmetrazine (code name PAL-704), also known as 3-methyl-2-(2′-naphthyl)morpholine, is a monoamine releasing agent (MRA) and monoamine reuptake inhibitor (MRI) of the phenylmorpholine and naphthylaminopropane families related to phenmetrazine. It is an analogue of phenmetrazine in which the phenyl ring has been replaced with a naphthalene ring.

The drug acts as a hybrid norepinephrine–dopamine releasing agent (NDRA) and serotonin reuptake inhibitor (SRI). Its EC_{50} values for induction of monoamine release are 111 nM for dopamine, 203 nM for norepinephrine, and inactive for serotonin in rat brain synaptosomes, whereas its IC_{50} for serotonin reuptake inhibition is 105 nM. Hence, it is about equipotent in inducing dopamine release and inhibiting serotonin reuptake and is about 2-fold more potent in these actions than in inducing norepinephrine release.

In terms of chemical structure, naphthylmetrazine is to phenmetrazine as naphthylisopropylamine (PAL-287) is to amphetamine. Other naphthyl analogues of amphetamines and related compounds include methamnetamine (PAL-1046; "naphthylmethamphetamine"), ethylnaphthylaminopropane (ENAP; PAL-1045; "naphthylethylamphetamine"), BMAPN (βk-methamnetamine; "naphthylmethcathinone"), methylnaphthidate (HDMP-28; "naphthylmethylphenidate"), ethylnaphthidate (HDEP-28; "naphthylethylphenidate"), and naphyrone ("naphthyl-α-PVP" or "naphthylpyrovalerone"; O-2482).

A closely related compound to naphthylmetrazine is naphthylmorpholine (PAL-678), the naphthyl analogue of the phenmetrazine parent compound 2-phenylmorpholine (PAL-632).

Monoamine release of naphthylmetrazine and related agents (EC_{50}, nM)
Compound	NE	DA	5-HT	Ref
d-Amphetamine	6.6–10.2	5.8–24.8	698–1,765	
Naphthylaminopropane (NAP; PAL-287)	11.1	12.6	3.4	
d-Methamphetamine	12.3–14.3	8.5–40.4	736–1,292	
Methylnaphthylaminopropane (MNAP; PAL-1046)	34	10	13	
l-Methcathinone	13.1	14.8	1,772	
2-Naphthylmethcathinone (BMAPN; βk-MNAP)	94% at 10 μM	34	27	
d-Ethylamphetamine	28.8	44.1	333.0	
Ethylnaphthylaminopropane (ENAP; PAL-1045)	137	46 ^{a}	12 ^{a}	
2-Phenylmorpholine (PAL-632)	79	86	20,260	
Naphthylmorpholine (PAL-678)	88% at 10 μM	79% at 10 μM	92% at 10 μM	
Phenmetrazine	29–50.4	70–131	7,765–>10,000	
Naphthylmetrazine (PAL-704)	203	111	RI (105)	
Notes: The smaller the value, the more strongly the drug releases the neurotransmitter. The assays were done in rat brain synaptosomes and human potencies may be different. See also Monoamine releasing agent § Activity profiles for a larger table with more compounds. Footnotes: ^{a} ENAP is a partial releaser of serotonin (E_{max} = 66%) and dopamine (E_{max} = 78%). Refs:
