= C10H13NO =

The molecular formula C_{10}H_{13}NO (molar mass: 163.21 g/mol, exact mass: 163.0997 u) may refer to:

- Formetamide
- Kairine
- MEAI
- Methcathinone
- 4-Methylcathinone
- 4-Methyl-5-phenyl-1,3-oxazolidine
- 2-Phenylmorpholine
