= Substituted phenylmorpholine =

Class of chemical compounds

Various phenmetrazine derivatives

Substituted phenylmorpholines, or substituted phenmetrazines alternatively, are chemical derivatives of 2-phenylmorpholine or of the psychostimulant drug phenmetrazine.

Most such compounds act as releasers of monoamine neurotransmitters, and have stimulant effects. Some also act as agonists at serotonin receptors, and compounds with an N-propyl substitution act as dopamine receptor agonists.

A number of derivatives from this class have been investigated for medical applications, such as for use as anorectics or medications for the treatment of ADHD. Some compounds have also become subject to illicit use as designer drugs.

== List of phenylmorpholines ==
List of phenmetrazine analogues and related compounds
Substance	Structure	CAS #
2-phenylmorpholine		23972-41-0
4-phenylmorpholine		92-53-5
2-phenyl-3-methylmorpholine (phenmetrazine)		134-49-6
2-phenyl-3,4-dimethylmorpholine (phendimetrazine)		634-03-7
2-phenyl-5-methylmorpholine (isophenmetrazine)		80123-66-6
2-phenyl-3-ethylmorpholine (phenetrazine)		100368-98-7
2-phenyl-3-methyl-4-ethylmorpholine (phenmetetrazine)		92196-09-3
2-phenyl-3,5-dimethylmorpholine (PDM-35)		1218345-44-8
2-phenyl-3,6-dimethylmorpholine (6-methylphenmetrazine, 3,6-DMPM)		92902-99-3
2-phenyl-5,5-dimethylmorpholine (G-130)		42013-48-9
2-phenyl-3-methylmorpholin-5-one (fenmetramide)		5588-29-4
4-isopropyl-2-phenylmorpholine		23222-62-0
Fenbutrazate		4378-36-3
Morazone		6536-18-1
2-Fluorophenmetrazine		1533654-24-8
3-fluorophenmetrazine (PAL-593)		1350768-28-3
4-Fluorophenmetrazine (PAL-748)		1097796-73-0
3-Fluorophenetrazine		
3-Chlorophenmetrazine (PAL-594)		1097796-78-5
3-Methoxyphenmetrazine		
2-Methylphenmetrazine		1507705-48-7
3-methylphenmetrazine (PAL-773)		1350768-41-0
4-methylphenmetrazine (PAL-747)		1998216-41-3
4-methylphendimetrazine		1445576-23-7
3-Iodophenmetrazine		
2-(4-Bromo-2,5-dimethoxyphenyl)morpholine (2C-B-morpholine)		
3,4-Methylenedioxyphenmetrazine		
Naphthylmetrazine (PAL-704)		
2-(thiophen-2-yl)-3-methylmorpholine		
2-(3-(Trifluoromethyl)phenyl)morpholine (flumexadol)		30914-89-7
Oxaflozane		26629-87-8
Phenmetrazol		1350768-19-2
N-Ethylphenmetrazol		97630-98-3
(+)-(2S,3S)-2-(3-chlorophenyl)-3,5,5-trimethylmorpholin-2-ol (radafaxine)		106083-71-0
(2S,3S,5R)-2-(3,5-difluorophenyl)-3,5-dimethylmorpholin-2-ol (manifaxine)		135306-39-7
PF-219,061		710654-74-3
PF-592,379		710655-15-5
OSU-6162		156907-84-5
LPH-5		2641630-97-7
2-Methyl-3-phenylpiperidine		70769-67-4
2-Phenyl-3-methyl-thiomorpholine		
4-Methyl-5-phenyl-1,3-oxazolidine		42794-92-3
Picilorex		62510-56-9
Butyltolylquinuclidine		
3-benzylmorpholine (3-BZM)		7684-27-7
3-Benzhydrylmorpholine (3-BZHM)		93406-27-0

Additional phenylmorpholines and their activities as monoamine releasing agents (MRAs) have been described.

== See also ==
- Substituted amphetamine
- Substituted benzofuran
- Substituted cathinone
- Substituted methylenedioxyphenethylamine
- List of aminorex analogues
- List of methylphenidate analogues
- List of phenyltropanes
- List of cocaine analogues
