= PDM-35 =

Chemical compound

3,5-dimethyl-2-phenylmorpholine (PDM-35)

Legal status
- Legal status: CA: Unscheduled; DE: NpSG (Industrial and scientific use only); UK: Under Psychoactive Substances Act; US: Analogue to a Schedule I/II drug

Identifiers
- IUPAC name: 3,5-dimethyl-2-phenylmorpholine
- CAS Number: 1218345-44-8
- PubChem CID: 43367115
- DrugBank: Provide Please Provide
- UNII: B5FRU2US8C
- CompTox Dashboard (EPA): DTXSID801342603

2-Phenyl-3,5-dimethylmorpholine is a drug with stimulant and anorectic effects, related to phenmetrazine. Based on what is known from other phenylmorpholines with similar structure, it likely acts as a norepinephrine-dopamine releasing agent and may produce effects similar or slightly different to phenmetrazine.

== See also ==
- 3-Fluorophenmetrazine
- G-130 (2-Phenyl-5,5-dimethylmorpholine)
- 3,4-Phendimetrazine (2-Phenyl-3,4-dimethylmorpholine)
- 3,6-Phendimetrazine (2-Phenyl-3,6-dimethylmorpholine)
- 4-Methylphenmetrazine
- Manifaxine
- Radafaxine
- Viloxazine
