= C14H15NO =

The molecular formula C_{14}H_{15}NO (molar mass: 213.27 g/mol, exact mass: 213.115364 u) may refer to:

- 1-Naphthylmethcathinone
- 2-Naphthylmethcathinone
- Naphthylmorpholine
