= Pseudophenmetrazine =

Chemical compound

Clinical data
- ATC code: None

Identifiers
- IUPAC name: (±)-cis-3-methyl-2-phenylmorpholine or (±)-(2RS,3SR)-3-methyl-2-phenylmorpholine
- CAS Number: 13580-23-9
- PubChem CID: 10329865
- ChemSpider: 8505326
- UNII: 5BXE22Z857

Chemical and physical data
- Formula: C_{11}H_{15}NO
- Molar mass: 177.247 g·mol^{−1}
- 3D model (JSmol): Interactive image
- SMILES: C[C@@H]1[C@@H](OCCN1)C2=CC=CC=C2
- InChI: InChI=1S/C11H15NO/c1-9-11(13-8-7-12-9)10-5-3-2-4-6-10/h2-6,9,11-12H,7-8H2,1H3/t9-,11-/m1/s1; Key:OOBHFESNSZDWIU-MWLCHTKSSA-N

Pseudophenmetrazine is a psychostimulant of the phenylmorpholine group. It is the N-demethylated and cis-configured analogue of phendimetrazine as well as the cis-configured stereoisomer of phenmetrazine. In addition, along with phenmetrazine, it is believed to be one of the active metabolites of phendimetrazine, which itself is inactive and behaves merely as a prodrug.

Relative to phenmetrazine, pseudophenmetrazine is of fairly low potency, acting as a modest releasing agent of norepinephrine (EC_{50} = 514 nM), while its (+)-enantiomer is a weak releaser of dopamine (EC_{50} = 1,457 nM) whereas its (−)-enantiomer is a weak reuptake inhibitor of dopamine (K_{i} = 2,691 nM); together as a racemic mixture with the two enantiomers combined, pseudophenmetrazine behaves overall more as a dopamine reuptake inhibitor (K_{i} = 2,630 nM), possibly due to the (+)-enantiomer blocking the uptake of the (−)-enantiomer into dopaminergic neurons and thus preventing it from inducing dopamine release. Neither enantiomer has any significant effect on serotonin reuptake or release (both K_{i} = >10,000 nM and EC_{50} = >10,000 nM, respectively).

Monoamine release of pseudophenmetrazine and related agents (EC_{50}, nM)
Compound	NE	DA	5-HT	Ref
Phenethylamine	10.9	39.5	>10,000	
Dextroamphetamine	6.6–10.2	5.8–24.8	698–1,765	
Dextromethamphetamine	12.3–14.3	8.5–40.4	736–1,292	
2-Phenylmorpholine	79	86	20,260	
Phenmetrazine	29–50.4	70–131	7,765–>10,000	
(+)-Phenmetrazine	37.5	87.4	3246	
(–)-Phenmetrazine	62.9	415	>10,000	
Phendimetrazine	>10,000	>10,000	>100,000	
Pseudophenmetrazine	514	>10,000 (RI)	>10,000	
(+)-Pseudophenmetrazine	349	1,457	>10,000	
(–)-Pseudophenmetrazine	2,511	IA (RI)	>10,000	
Notes: The smaller the value, the more strongly the drug releases the neurotransmitter. The assays were done in rat brain synaptosomes and human potencies may be different. See also Monoamine releasing agent § Activity profiles for a larger table with more compounds. Refs:
