= Napactadine =

Antidepressant drug

Clinical data
- Other names: DL-588

Identifiers
- IUPAC name: N,N'-dimethyl-2-naphthalen-2-ylethanimidamide
- CAS Number: 76631-45-3
- PubChem CID: 42153
- ChemSpider: 38442
- UNII: 571S87U90N
- ChEMBL: ChEMBL1192539

Chemical and physical data
- Formula: C_{14}H_{16}N_{2}
- Molar mass: 212.296 g·mol^{−1}
- 3D model (JSmol): Interactive image
- SMILES: CNC(=NC)CC1=CC2=CC=CC=C2C=C1
- InChI: InChI=1S/C14H16N2/c1-15-14(16-2)10-11-7-8-12-5-3-4-6-13(12)9-11/h3-9H,10H2,1-2H3,(H,15,16); Key:NAHCWQNNENHGNH-UHFFFAOYSA-N

Napactadine (DL-588) is an antidepressant which has structural properties that look similar to PAL-287 or methamnetamine, but is based on an amidine functional group.

== Synthesis ==
The synthesis of napactadine has been described:

Napactadine synthesis

Reaction of N-methyl-2-(naphthalen-2-yl)acetamide [2086-65-9] (1) with triethyloxonium fluoroborate (Meerwein reagent) [368-39-8] (2) affords the corresponding imino ether (3). Exposure of this intermediate to methylamine (4) leads to napactidine (5).

== See also ==
- Substituted naphthylethylamine
