= C13H15N =

The molecular formula C_{13}H_{15}N (molar mass: 185.27 g/mol) may refer to:

- Naphthylaminopropane
- 1-Naphthylaminopropane
- SU-11739
