= Fenmetramide =

Chemical compound

Clinical data
- ATC code: None

Identifiers
- IUPAC name: 2-Phenyl-3-methyl-morpholin-5-one
- CAS Number: 5588-29-4
- PubChem CID: 21789
- ChemSpider: 20479
- UNII: WCH9HW127L
- KEGG: D04153
- CompTox Dashboard (EPA): DTXSID00863576

Chemical and physical data
- Formula: C_{11}H_{13}NO_{2}
- Molar mass: 191.230 g·mol^{−1}
- 3D model (JSmol): Interactive image
- SMILES: CC1C(OCC(=O)N1)C2=CC=CC=C2
- InChI: InChI=1S/C11H13NO2/c1-8-11(14-7-10(13)12-8)9-5-3-2-4-6-9/h2-6,8,11H,7H2,1H3,(H,12,13); Key:UJEPHPADGSWWRM-UHFFFAOYSA-N

Fenmetramide is a drug which was patented as an antidepressant by McNeil Laboratories in the 1960s. The drug was never marketed. It is the 5-ketone derivative of phenmetrazine and would similarly be expected to produce psychostimulant effects, though pharmacological data is lacking.

== See also ==
- Fenbutrazate
- Phendimetrazine
- Phenmetrazine
