= Naphthylmethcathinone =

Naphthylmethcathinone may refer to:

- 1-Naphthylmethcathinone (AMAPN)
- 2-Naphthylmethcathinone (BMAPN)
