= 4-Methyl-5-phenyl-1,3-oxazolidine =

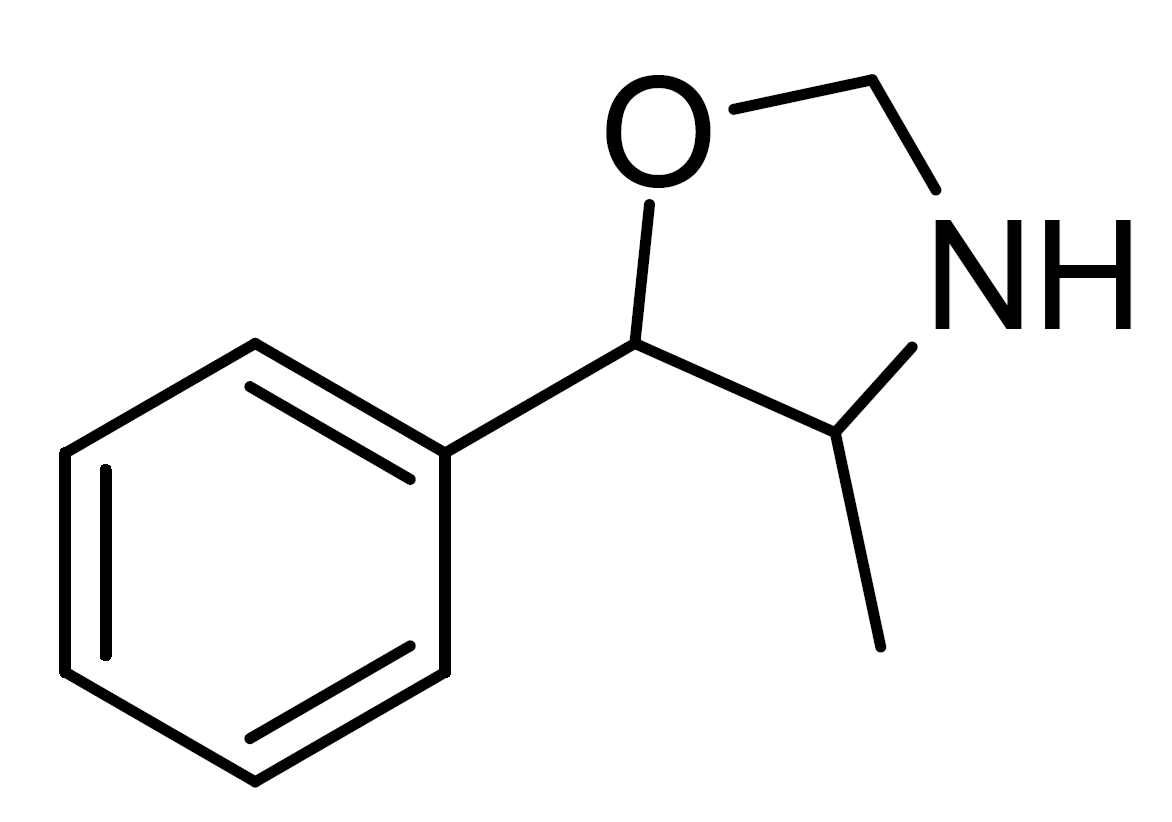

Identifiers
- CAS Number: 42794-92-3 70939-17-2 (mixture of cis isomers) 70939-18-3 (mixture of trans isomers)
- PubChem CID: 13026109
- ChemSpider: 10250838

Chemical and physical data
- Formula: C_{10}H_{13}NO
- Molar mass: 163.220 g·mol^{−1}
- 3D model (JSmol): Interactive image
- SMILES: CC1C(OCN1)C2=CC=CC=C2
- InChI: InChI=1S/C10H13NO/c1-8-10(12-7-11-8)9-5-3-2-4-6-9/h2-6,8,10-11H,7H2,1H3; Key:WGTBUDNMXMVQRQ-UHFFFAOYSA-N

4-Methyl-5-phenyl-1,3-oxazolidine is a recreational designer drug with stimulant effects. It is the ring-contracted analogue of phenmetrazine, having a 5 membered oxazolidine ring in place of the 6 membered morpholine core of phenmetrazine, and has similar stimulant effects with only slightly lower potency, though less chemical stability due to the acid-sensitive oxazolidine ring.

== See also ==
- Substituted phenylmorpholine
- List of aminorex analogues
- 3-Chlorophenmetrazine
- 3-Fluorophenmetrazine
- 4-Methylaminorex
