= 4-Methylphenmetrazine =

Stimulant designer drug

Identifiers
- IUPAC name: 3-methyl-2-(4-methylphenyl)morpholine
- CAS Number: 1094649-71-4 1998216-41-3 (Hydrochloride)
- PubChem CID: 43169333
- ChemSpider: 27935395
- UNII: V88J79BT5J
- CompTox Dashboard (EPA): DTXSID001336886

Chemical and physical data
- Formula: C_{12}H_{17}NO
- Molar mass: 191.274 g·mol^{−1}
- 3D model (JSmol): Interactive image
- SMILES: CC1C(OCCN1)C2=CC=C(C=C2)C
- InChI: InChI=1S/C12H17NO/c1-9-3-5-11(6-4-9)12-10(2)13-7-8-14-12/h3-6,10,12-13H,7-8H2,1-2H3; Key:NWNCIXFIIDVRKE-UHFFFAOYSA-N

4-Methylphenmetrazine (mephenmetrazine, 4-MPM, PAL-747) is a recreational designer drug with stimulant effects. It is a substituted phenylmorpholine derivative, closely related to better known drugs such as phenmetrazine and 3-fluorophenmetrazine. It was first identified in Slovenia in 2015, and has been shown to act as a monoamine releaser with some preference for serotonin release.

== See also ==
- 4,4'-DMAR
- 4-Methylamphetamine
- 4-Methylmethylphenidate
- G-130
- Mephedrone
- RTI-32
- Phendimetrazine
- PDM-35
