= C15H24N2O =

The molecular formula C_{15}H_{24}N_{2}O (molar mass: 248.36 g/mol, exact mass: 248.1889 u) may refer to:

- Matrine
- Morforex, or N-morpholinoethylamphetamine
- Trimecaine
