= ENAP =

ENAP may refer to:

- École nationale d'administration publique, school of public administration in Quebec, Canada
- Empresa Nacional del Petróleo, Chilean oil company
- Escuela Nacional de Artes Plásticas, art school of the National Autonomous University of Mexico
- Escuela Nacional de Artes Plásticas "Rafael Rodríguez Padilla", art school in Guatemala City, Guatemala
- Ethylnaphthylaminopropane, a partial monoamine releasing agent
