= C15H12N2O =

The molecular formula C_{15}H_{12}N_{2}O (molar mass: 236.27 g/mol) may refer to:

- Benzodiazepine (core structure)
- Carbamazepine
- Nafimidone
