= Fenbutrazate =

Chemical compound

Clinical data
- Routes of administration: Oral
- ATC code: none

Legal status
- Legal status: In general: ℞ (Prescription only)

Identifiers
- IUPAC name: 2-(3-methyl-2-phenylmorpholin-4-yl)ethyl 2-phenylbutanoate
- CAS Number: 4378-36-3
- PubChem CID: 20395
- ChemSpider: 19210
- UNII: BKY8H56395
- ChEMBL: ChEMBL2104316
- CompTox Dashboard (EPA): DTXSID6057746
- ECHA InfoCard: 100.022.256

Chemical and physical data
- Formula: C_{23}H_{29}NO_{3}
- Molar mass: 367.489 g·mol^{−1}
- 3D model (JSmol): Interactive image
- SMILES: O=C(OCCN1C(C(OCC1)c2ccccc2)C)C(c3ccccc3)CC

Fenbutrazate (INN), also known as phenbutrazate (BAN), is a psychostimulant used as an appetite suppressant under the trade names Cafilon, Filon, and Sabacid in Europe, Japan, and Hong Kong. It is a derivative of phenmetrazine and may function as a prodrug due to its similarity to phendimetrazine.

== See also ==
- Morazone
- Phendimetrazine
- Phenmetrazine
