= Methylenedioxyphenmetrazine =

Chemical compound

MDPM

Identifiers
- IUPAC name: 2-(1,3-benzodioxol-5-yl)-3-methylmorpholine
- PubChem CID: 82286499
- ChemSpider: 26709739
- UNII: MKT3G7K43G
- CompTox Dashboard (EPA): DTXSID401337062

Chemical and physical data
- Formula: C_{12}H_{15}NO_{3}
- Molar mass: 221.256 g·mol^{−1}
- 3D model (JSmol): Interactive image
- SMILES: CC1NCCOC1c1cc2OCOc2cc1
- InChI: InChI=1S/C12H15NO3/c1-8-12(14-5-4-13-8)9-2-3-10-11(6-9)16-7-15-10/h2-3,6,8,12-13H,4-5,7H2,1H3; Key:JMABLCPXWZOLCW-UHFFFAOYSA-N

3,4-Methylenedioxyphenmetrazine (MDPM or 3-MDPM) is a recreational designer drug with stimulant effects. It is a substituted phenylmorpholine derivative, closely related to better known drugs such as phenmetrazine and 3-fluorophenmetrazine. It has been identified as a synthetic impurity formed in certain routes of MDMA manufacture.

== See also ==
- Substituted methylenedioxyphenethylamine
- 3-Chlorophenmetrazine
- MDMAR
- MDPV
- Methylone
