= 2-Phenyl-3,6-dimethylmorpholine =

Chemical compound

Legal status
- Legal status: DE: NpSG (Industrial and scientific use only); UK: Under Psychoactive Substances Act

Identifiers
- IUPAC name: 2-phenyl-3,6-dimethylmorpholine
- CAS Number: 92903-00-9
- PubChem CID: 43174741
- ChemSpider: 38138973
- UNII: T043FM5H3Q
- CompTox Dashboard (EPA): DTXSID601029673 DTXSID20655677, DTXSID601029673

Chemical and physical data
- Formula: C_{12}H_{17}NO
- Molar mass: 191.274 g·mol^{−1}
- 3D model (JSmol): Interactive image
- SMILES: CC1NCC(C)OC1c2ccccc2
- InChI: InChI=1S/C12H17NO/c1-9-8-13-10(2)12(14-9)11-6-4-3-5-7-11/h3-7,9-10,12-13H,8H2,1-2H3; Key:FZEIVUHEODGHML-UHFFFAOYSA-N

2-Phenyl-3,6-dimethylmorpholine is a drug with stimulant and anorectic effects, related to phenmetrazine. Based on what is known from other phenylmorpholines with similar structure, it likely acts as a serotonin reuptake inhibitor and may produce antidepressant-like effects. Anecdotal reports suggest, however, that the compound is inactive aside from anorectic effects.

== See also ==
- 3-Fluorophenmetrazine
- G-130 (2-Phenyl-5,5-dimethylmorpholine)
- 3,4-Phendimetrazine (2-Phenyl-3,4-dimethylmorpholine)
- PDM-35 (3,5-Phendimetrazine) (2-Phenyl-3,5-dimethylmorpholine)
- Manifaxine
- Radafaxine
