= Morazone =

NSAID analgesic drug

Clinical data
- Trade names: Novartrina, Orsimon, Rosimon-Neu, Tarcuzate
- Routes of administration: Oral, SC, IM
- Drug class: Nonsteroidal anti-inflammatory drug (NSAID); Analgesic; Stimulant
- ATC code: None

Legal status
- Legal status: In general: ℞ (Prescription only)

Pharmacokinetic data
- Metabolites: Phenmetrazine

Identifiers
- IUPAC name: 1,5-dimethyl-4-[(3-methyl-2-phenylmorpholin-4-yl)methyl]-2-phenyl-1,2-dihydro-3H-pyrazol-3-one
- CAS Number: 6536-18-1
- PubChem CID: 39609
- ChemSpider: 36216
- UNII: 870Q5BL2FN
- CompTox Dashboard (EPA): DTXSID10863901
- ECHA InfoCard: 100.026.771

Chemical and physical data
- Formula: C_{23}H_{27}N_{3}O_{2}
- Molar mass: 377.488 g·mol^{−1}
- 3D model (JSmol): Interactive image
- SMILES: c1ccccc1N2N(C)C(C)=C(C2=O)CN3CCOC(C3C)c4ccccc4
- InChI: InChI=1S/C23H27N3O2/c1-17-21(23(27)26(24(17)3)20-12-8-5-9-13-20)16-25-14-15-28-22(18(25)2)19-10-6-4-7-11-19/h4-13,18,22H,14-16H2,1-3H3; Key:OOGNFQMTGRZRAB-UHFFFAOYSA-N

Morazone, sold under the brand names Novartrina, Orsimon, Rosimon-Neu, and Tarcuzate, is a nonsteroidal anti-inflammatory drug (NSAID), originally developed by the German pharmaceutical company Ravensberg in the 1950s, which is used as an analgesic. It produces phenmetrazine as a major metabolite and has been reported to have been abused as a recreational drug in the past.

== See also ==
- Substituted phenylmorpholine
- Famprofazone
- Morforex
