= 5-MAPDI =

Chemical compound

Clinical data
- ATC code: none

Identifiers
- IUPAC name: 1-(2,3-Dihydro-1H-inden-5-yl)-N-methylpropan-2-amine
- CAS Number: 1310153-27-5
- PubChem CID: 57461970
- ChemSpider: 26679339
- UNII: 7NDJ44KFB8

Chemical and physical data
- Formula: C_{13}H_{19}N
- Molar mass: 189.302 g·mol^{−1}
- 3D model (JSmol): Interactive image
- SMILES: CNC(Cc1ccc2c(c1)CCC2)C
- InChI: InChI=1S/C13H19N/c1-10(14-2)8-11-6-7-12-4-3-5-13(12)9-11/h6-7,9-10,14H,3-5,8H2,1-2H3; Key:MHBKJTHGGWQKSG-UHFFFAOYSA-N

5-MAPDI (also known as Indanylmethylaminopropane or IMP) is an entactogenic amphetamine derivative which is structurally related to MDMA as well as to dihydrobenzofuran derivatives such as 5-MAPDB and 6-MAPDB, and has been sold as a designer drug. It has reportedly been sold over grey-market websites since around 2014, although the first definitive identification was not made until September 2016 by a forensic laboratory in Slovenia.

== See also ==
- 5-MAPBT
- IBF5MAP
