= Pronethalol =

Chemical compound

Clinical data
- Trade names: Alderlin
- Other names: Nethalide; Pronetalol; Naphthylisoproterenol; ICI-38174; ICI38174; Compound 38174; AY-6204; AY6204
- Routes of administration: Oral
- Drug class: Beta blocker
- ATC code: None

Legal status
- Legal status: Withdrawn

Identifiers
- IUPAC name: 1-(naphthalen-2-yl)-2-(propan-2-ylamino)ethanol
- CAS Number: 54-80-8
- PubChem CID: 4930
- ChemSpider: 4761
- UNII: XBP4RT1IMQ
- KEGG: C11707
- ChEBI: CHEBI:8463
- ChEMBL: ChEMBL16476
- CompTox Dashboard (EPA): DTXSID8021193

Chemical and physical data
- Formula: C_{15}H_{19}NO
- Molar mass: 229.323 g·mol^{−1}
- 3D model (JSmol): Interactive image
- Chirality: Racemic mixture
- SMILES: CC(C)NCC(C1=CC2=CC=CC=C2C=C1)O
- InChI: InChI=1S/C15H19NO/c1-11(2)16-10-15(17)14-8-7-12-5-3-4-6-13(12)9-14/h3-9,11,15-17H,10H2,1-2H3; Key:HRSANNODOVBCST-UHFFFAOYSA-N

Pronethalol, sold under the brand name Alderlin, was an early non-selective beta blocker. It was the first beta blocker to be developed by James Black and associates at Imperial Chemical Industries, and the first to enter clinical use, in November 1963.

However, it was never used widely due to carcinogenicity in mice, which was thought to result from formation of a carcinogenic naphthalene epoxide metabolite, and was superseded by propranolol from 1965 onward.

== See also ==
- Beta blocker
- Discovery and development of beta-blockers
- Substituted naphthylethylamine
- Naphthylaminopropane
