= 1-Naphthylaminopropane =

Clinical data
- Other names: 1-NAP; 1-(1-Naphthyl)-2-aminopropane; α-Naphthylaminopropane; α-NAP; 1-Naphthylisopropylamine; α-Naphthylisopropylamine; Benzamphetamine

Identifiers
- IUPAC name: 1-naphthalen-1-ylpropan-2-amine
- CAS Number: 12687-37-5
- PubChem CID: 413939
- ChemSpider: 366505
- ChEMBL: ChEMBL471838
- CompTox Dashboard (EPA): DTXSID80925727

Chemical and physical data
- Formula: C_{13}H_{15}N
- Molar mass: 185.270 g·mol^{−1}
- 3D model (JSmol): Interactive image
- SMILES: CC(CC1=CC=CC2=CC=CC=C21)N
- InChI: InChI=1S/C13H15N/c1-10(14)9-12-7-4-6-11-5-2-3-8-13(11)12/h2-8,10H,9,14H2,1H3; Key:ODTJDLMNBKMVGR-UHFFFAOYSA-N

1-Naphthylaminopropane (1-NAP), also known as 1-naphthylisopropylamine or as α-naphthylaminopropane (α-NAP), is a drug of the amphetamine and naphthylaminopropane families. It is a positional isomer of 2-naphthylaminopropane (2-NAP; PAL-287).

2-NAP and derivatives like methylnaphthylaminopropane (MNAP) are known to be potent serotonin–norepinephrine–dopamine releasing agents (SNDRAs) and/or serotonin receptor agonists, whereas 1-NAP has not been assessed in these regards. Both 1-NAP and 2-NAP failed to substitute for dextroamphetamine in rodent drug discrimination tests, suggesting that they lack stimulant effects.

2-NAP is a potent monoamine oxidase inhibitor (MAOI), specifically of monoamine oxidase A (MAO-A) (IC_{50} = 420 nM). 1-NAP is an MAOI as well, also of MAO-A (IC_{50} = 5,630 nM), but was about 13-fold less potent than 2-NAP. Neither 2-NAP or 1-NAP inhibited monoamine oxidase B (MAO-B) (IC_{50} > 100,000 nM).

1-NAP was first described in the scientific literature by at least 1952.

== See also ==
- 1-Naphthylmethcathinone (AMAPN)
