= Methamnetamine =

Chemical compound

Clinical data
- Other names: Methylnaphetamine; MNA; MNT; MNAP; PAL-1046; MY-10; N-Methylnaphthylaminopropane; N-Methylnaphthylisopropylamine
- Drug class: Serotonin-norepinephrine-dopamine releasing agent

Legal status
- Legal status: DE: NpSG (Industrial and scientific use only); UK: Under Psychoactive Substances Act; Illegal in Japan

Identifiers
- IUPAC name: N-methyl-1-(naphthalen-2-yl)propan-2-amine
- CAS Number: 1178720-66-5
- PubChem CID: 17802040
- ChemSpider: 38754167
- UNII: CAS64BB01B
- CompTox Dashboard (EPA): DTXSID801032850

Chemical and physical data
- Formula: C_{14}H_{17}N
- Molar mass: 199.297 g·mol^{−1}
- 3D model (JSmol): Interactive image
- SMILES: CNC(C)Cc1ccc2ccccc2c1
- InChI: InChI=1S/C14H17N/c1-11(15-2)9-12-7-8-13-5-3-4-6-14(13)10-12/h3-8,10-11,15H,9H2,1-2H3; Key:BWWWOLYZMKACSB-UHFFFAOYSA-N

Methamnetamine (also known as methylnaphetamine, MNA, MNT, MNAP, PAL-1046, and MY-10) is a triple monoamine releasing agent of the amphetamine and naphthylaminopropane families. It is the N-methyl analog of the non-neurotoxic experimental drug naphthylaminopropane and the naphthalene analog of methamphetamine. It has been sold online as a designer drug between 2015 and 2016.

== Pharmacology ==
=== Pharmacodynamics ===
Methamnetamine acts as a releasing agent of serotonin, norepinephrine, and dopamine, with EC_{50} values of 13 nM, 34 nM, and 10 nM, respectively. It is also a lower-potency partial agonist of the serotonin 5-HT_{2A} receptor.

Monoamine release of methamnetamine and related agents (EC_{50}, nM)
Compound	NE	DA	5-HT	Ref
d-Amphetamine	6.6–10.2	5.8–24.8	698–1,765	
Naphthylaminopropane (NAP; PAL-287)	11.1	12.6	3.4	
d-Methamphetamine	12.3–14.3	8.5–40.4	736–1,292	
Methylnaphthylaminopropane (MNAP; PAL-1046)	34	10	13	
l-Methcathinone	13.1	14.8	1,772	
2-Naphthylmethcathinone (BMAPN; βk-MNAP)	94% at 10 μM	34	27	
d-Ethylamphetamine	28.8	44.1	333.0	
Ethylnaphthylaminopropane (ENAP; PAL-1045)	137	46 ^{a}	12 ^{a}	
Phenmetrazine	29–50.4	70–131	7,765–>10,000	
Naphthylmetrazine (PAL-704)	203	111	RI (105)	
Notes: The smaller the value, the more strongly the drug releases the neurotransmitter. The assays were done in rat brain synaptosomes and human potencies may be different. See also Monoamine releasing agent § Activity profiles for a larger table with more compounds. Footnotes: ^{a} ENAP is a partial releaser of serotonin (E_{max} = 66%) and dopamine (E_{max} = 78%). Refs:

== Society and culture ==
=== Legal status ===
Methamnetamine is illegal in Japan.

== See also ==
- 2-MAPB
- 5-MAPBT
- BMAPN
- Naphthylaminopropane
- Ethylnaphthylaminopropane
- Naphthylpropylaminopentane
- HDEP-28
- HDMP-28
- Naphyrone
- WF-23
