= Ethylnaphthylaminopropane =

Clinical data
- Other names: ENAP; N-Ethylnaphthylaminopropane; N-Ethyl-NAP; PAL-1045; Ethamnetamine; Ethylnaphetamine; ENA; ENT; N-Ethylnaphthylisopropylamine; ENIPA

Identifiers
- IUPAC name: N-ethyl-1-naphthalen-2-ylpropan-2-amine
- PubChem CID: 61080203
- ChemSpider: 38754192

Chemical and physical data
- Formula: C_{15}H_{19}N
- Molar mass: 213.324 g·mol^{−1}
- 3D model (JSmol): Interactive image
- SMILES: CCNC(C)CC1=CC2=CC=CC=C2C=C1
- InChI: InChI=1S/C15H19N/c1-3-16-12(2)10-13-8-9-14-6-4-5-7-15(14)11-13/h4-9,11-12,16H,3,10H2,1-2H3; Key:HKSRURFPXCLKOG-UHFFFAOYSA-N

Ethylnaphthylaminopropane (ENAP; developmental code name PAL-1045) is a monoamine releasing agent (MRA) of the amphetamine and naphthylaminopropane families that is related to naphthylaminopropane (NAP; PAL-287) and methamnetamine (MNAP; PAL-1046). It acts specifically as a serotonin–norepinephrine–dopamine releasing agent (SNDRA). However, ENAP is unusual in being a partial releaser of serotonin and dopamine and a full releaser of norepinephrine.

The EC_{50} (E_{max}) values of ENAP in terms of monoamine release induction are 12 nM (66%) for serotonin, 46 nM (78%) for dopamine, and 137 nM (94%) for norepinephrine in rat brain synaptosomes. In contrast to NAP and MNAP, which produce clearly dose-dependent increases in locomotor stimulation and brain monoamine levels in rodents, ENAP has been found to show attenuated monoamine elevations and a "flat" dose–response curve. Relatedly, it may have less misuse liability than other drugs like amphetamine, although more research is necessary to assess this possibility.

In addition to its MRA activity, ENAP has been found to be an effective pharmacological chaperone for rescuing misfolded mutant monoamine transporters (MATs).

Monoamine release of ethylnaphthylaminopropane and related agents (EC_{50}, nM)
Compound	NE	DA	5-HT	Ref
d-Amphetamine	6.6–10.2	5.8–24.8	698–1,765	
Naphthylaminopropane (NAP; PAL-287)	11.1	12.6	3.4	
d-Methamphetamine	12.3–14.3	8.5–40.4	736–1,292	
Methylnaphthylaminopropane (MNAP; PAL-1046)	34	10	13	
l-Methcathinone	13.1	14.8	1,772	
2-Naphthylmethcathinone (BMAPN; βk-MNAP)	94% at 10 μM	34	27	
d-Ethylamphetamine	28.8	44.1	333.0	
Ethylnaphthylaminopropane (ENAP; PAL-1045)	137	46 ^{a}	12 ^{a}	
Phenmetrazine	29–50.4	70–131	7,765–>10,000	
Naphthylmetrazine (PAL-704)	203	111	RI (105)	
Notes: The smaller the value, the more strongly the drug releases the neurotransmitter. The assays were done in rat brain synaptosomes and human potencies may be different. See also Monoamine releasing agent § Activity profiles for a larger table with more compounds. Footnotes: ^{a} ENAP is a partial releaser of serotonin (E_{max} = 66%) and dopamine (E_{max} = 78%). Refs:

== See also ==
- Naphthylpropylaminopentane
