= Nafimidone =

Chemical compound

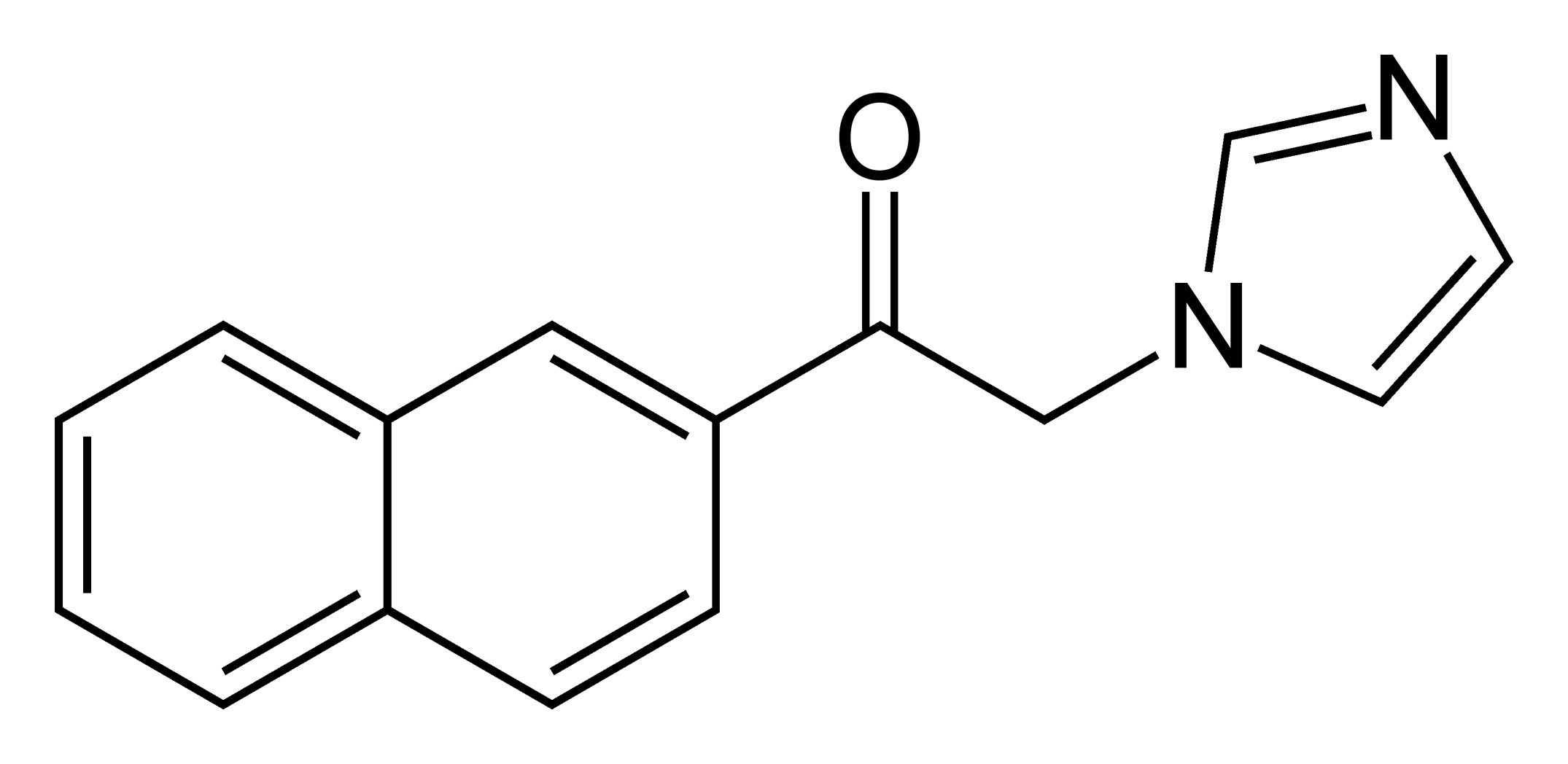

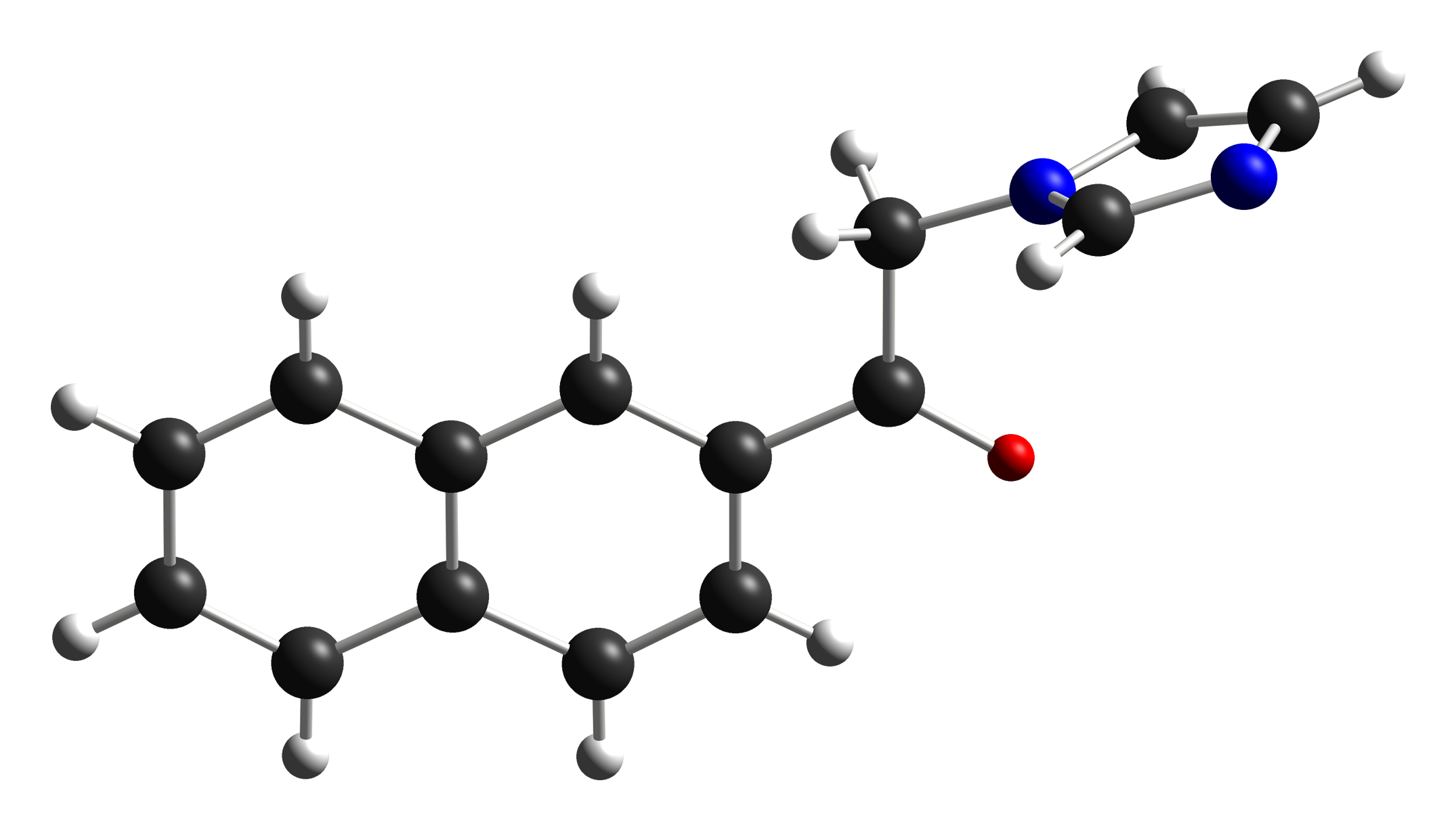

Identifiers
- CAS Number: 64212-22-2
- PubChem CID: 51200
- ChemSpider: 46394
- UNII: HZU3IQ1EWW
- CompTox Dashboard (EPA): DTXSID80214426

Chemical and physical data
- Formula: C_{15}H_{12}N_{2}O
- Molar mass: 236.274 g·mol^{−1}
- 3D model (JSmol): Interactive image
- SMILES: C1=CC=C2C=C(C=CC2=C1)C(=O)CN3C=CN=C3
- InChI: InChI=1S/C15H12N2O/c18-15(10-17-8-7-16-11-17)14-6-5-12-3-1-2-4-13(12)9-14/h1-9,11H,10H2; Key:ITPVLJQRUQVNSD-UHFFFAOYSA-N

Nafimidone is an anticonvulsant drug of the imidazole class. It contains a naphthyl group. It seems to have been discovered by accident during a search for antifungal agents.

== Synthesis ==
Nafimidone synthesis:

Its synthesis is straightforward displacement of imidazole of the activated chlorine atom of chloro-methyl-β-naphthylketone.

== See also ==
- 2-Naphthylmethcathinone
- Naphthylaminopropane
