= Propylcathinone =

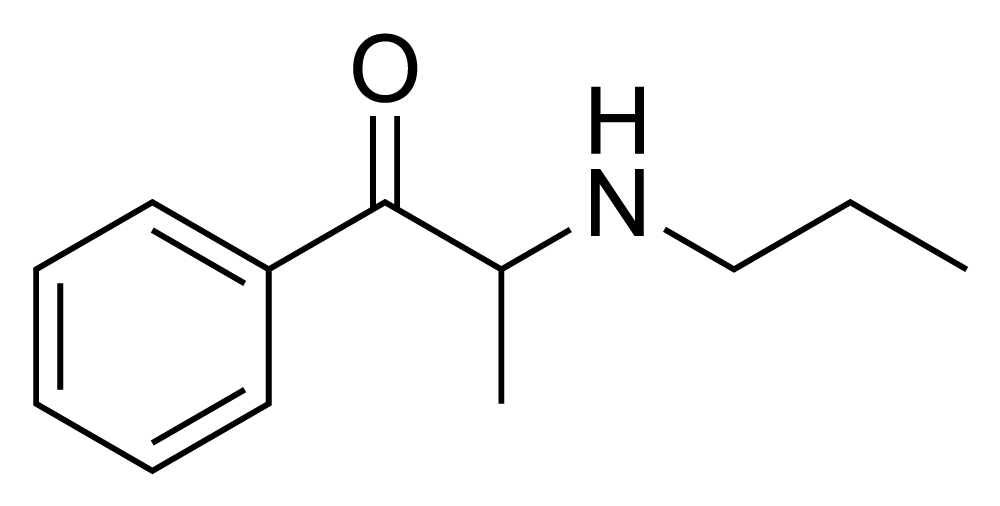

Clinical data
- Other names: PC; PrC; 2-(Propylamino)propanophenone; α-Propylaminopropiophenone; PAP; N-Propylcathinone; β-Keto-N-propylamphetamine; N-Pr-CAT; PAL-359; PAL359
- Drug class: Stimulant; Monoamine releasing agent; Monoamine reuptake inhibitor

Identifiers
- IUPAC name: 1-phenyl-2-(propylamino)propan-1-one
- CAS Number: 52597-14-5
- PubChem CID: 45049
- ChemSpider: 40983
- UNII: 5AJ9EZ7U7S

Chemical and physical data
- Formula: C_{12}H_{17}NO
- Molar mass: 191.274 g·mol^{−1}
- 3D model (JSmol): Interactive image
- SMILES: CCCNC(C)C(=O)C1=CC=CC=C1
- InChI: InChI=1S/C12H17NO/c1-3-9-13-10(2)12(14)11-7-5-4-6-8-11/h4-8,10,13H,3,9H2,1-2H3; Key:GXPFWFAQFTVCDU-UHFFFAOYSA-N

Propylcathinone (code name PAL-359), or N-propylcathinone, is a stimulant and designer drug of the amphetamine and cathinone families. It is known to be inactive as a dopamine reuptake inhibitor and releasing agent. Nonetheless, the drug substitutes for dextroamphetamine in animal drug discrimination tests. The related agent propylamphetamine is known to be partially metabolized into amphetamine and this is thought to be involved in its effects. Propylcathinone was first encountered as a novel designer drug in Europe by 2015.

== See also ==
- Ethcathinone
- Methcathinone
- Propylone
