= 3-Fluorophenmetrazine =

Stimulant designer drug

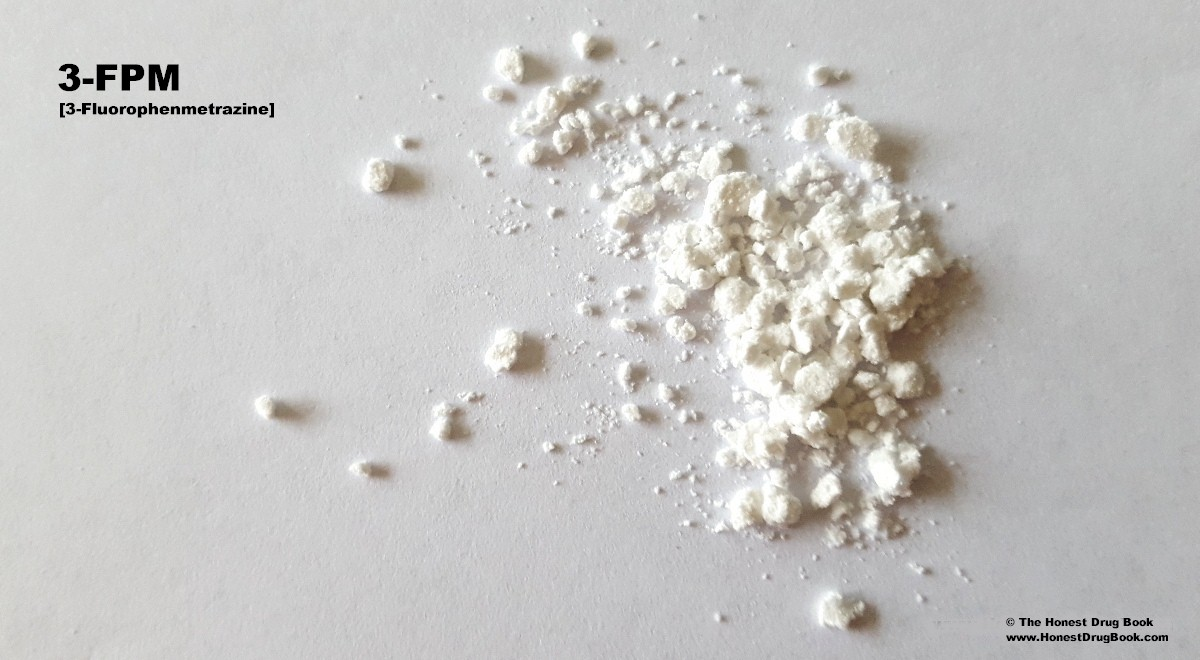

Clinical data
- Other names: 3-FPM, 3-FPH, PAL-593

Legal status
- Legal status: BR: Class F2 (Prohibited psychotropics); CA: Unscheduled; DE: NpSG (Industrial and scientific use only); UK: Under Psychoactive Substances Act; US: Unscheduled; Not controlled at the federal level, but possibly illegal under Federal Analogue Act of 1986, Schedule I in the state of Virginia; Illegal in Sweden and Switzerland

Identifiers
- IUPAC name: 2-(3-Fluorophenyl)-3-methylmorpholine
- CAS Number: 1350768-28-3; HCl: 1803562-83-5
- PubChem CID: 54673723; HCl: 75481405
- ChemSpider: 37509994; HCl: 34212559
- UNII: BEV6RF569G
- CompTox Dashboard (EPA): DTXSID201032414

Chemical and physical data
- Formula: C_{11}H_{14}FNO
- Molar mass: 195.237 g·mol^{−1}
- 3D model (JSmol): Interactive image; HCl: Interactive image
- Boiling point: 280.6 °C (537.1 °F)
- SMILES: CC1C(OCCN1)C2=CC(=CC=C2)F; HCl: CC1C(OCCN1)C2=CC(=CC=C2)F.Cl
- InChI: InChI=1S/C11H14FNO/c1-8-11(14-6-5-13-8)9-3-2-4-10(12)7-9/h2-4,7-8,11,13H,5-6H2,1H3; Key:VHYVKJAQSJCYCK-UHFFFAOYSA-N; HCl: InChI=1S/C11H14FNO.ClH/c1-8-11(14-6-5-13-8)9-3-2-4-10(12)7-9;/h2-4,7-8,11,13H,5-6H2,1H3;1H; Key:MHJBXKFJWSBWRE-UHFFFAOYSA-N

3-Fluorophenmetrazine (also known as 3-FPM, 3-FPH and PAL-593) is a phenylmorpholine-based stimulant and fluorinated analogue of phenmetrazine that has been sold online as a designer drug.

== Chemistry ==
3-Fluorophenmetrazine is a fluorinated analogue of phenmetrazine, a stimulant of the morpholine class.

3-Fluorophenmetrazine is a regioisomer of both 2-fluorophenmetrazine and 4-fluorophenmetrazine.

== Pharmacology ==
3-FPM acts as a norepinephrine–dopamine releasing agent with EC_{50} values of 30 nM and 43 nM, respectively. It shows only negligible efficacy as a releaser of serotonin, with an EC_{50} value of 2558 nM.

3-FPM also inhibits uptake mediated by dopamine transporters and norepinephrine transporters in HEK293 cells with potencies comparable to cocaine (IC_{50} values <2.5 μM), but with less potent effects at serotonin transporters (IC_{50} values >80 μM).

At sufficient doses, 3-FPM is capable of reversing monoamine transporters, particularly transporters of the catecholamines dopamine and norepinephrine, and, to a much lesser degree, serotonin transporters, thereby releasing these neurotransmitters from the cytosol into the extracellular space, where they are active.

Evaluation of its metabolic pathway revealed N-oxidation, aryl hydroxylation and subsequent O-methylation, alkyl hydroxylation, oxidation, and degradation of the ethyl-bridge yielding the O/N-bis-dealkylated metabolite, combinations thereof and further glucuronidation or sulfations.

== Legality ==
In the United States, 3-fluorophenmetrazine is not explicitly illegal at the federal level, but may be considered under the federal analogue act if intended for consumption as a structural analog of the Schedule II drug Phenmetrazine, but only if intended for human consumption.

On November 16, 2016, it became an illegal substance in the state of Virginia. As of 2019, it is also a schedule I substance in Virginia. The positional isomers of 3-fluorophenmetrazine such as 2-fluorophenmetrazine and 4-fluorophenmetrazine are also illegal under Virginia law, but not federal law.

Sweden's public health agency suggested to classify 3-Fluorophenmetrazine as illegal narcotic on June 1, 2015. It was finally classified on October 15, 2015.

3-Fluorophenmetrazine is illegal in Switzerland as of December 2015.

== See also ==
- 3F-NEH
- 3F-PiHP
- 3F-PVP
- 3-Fluoromethamphetamine
- 3-Fluoromethcathinone
- 3-Chlorophenmetrazine
- 4-Methylphenmetrazine
- 6'-Methylphenmetrazine
- G-130
- Manifaxine
- Methylenedioxyphenmetrazine
- Phenmetrazine
- Phendimetrazine
- List of substituted phenylmorpholines
