= Kairine =

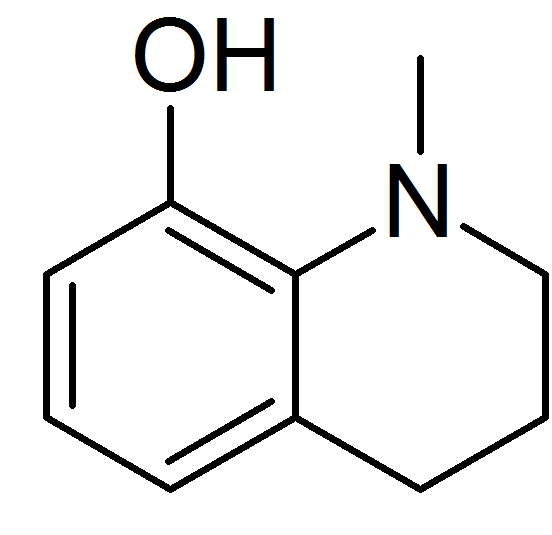

Names
- Preferred IUPAC name 1-Methyl-1,2,3,4-tetrahydroquinolin-8-ol

Identifiers
CAS Number	5080-60-4
3D model (JSmol)	Interactive image
ChemSpider	15544231
PubChem CID	12945981
UNII	L2F6AD5R4V
CompTox Dashboard (EPA)	DTXSID401027114
- InChI: InChI=1S/C10H13NO/c1-11-7-3-5-8-4-2-6-9(12)10(8)11/h2,4,6,12H,3,5,7H2,1H3 Key: AXONCVPTTFHNOI-UHFFFAOYSA-N; InChI=1/C10H13NO/c1-11-7-3-5-8-4-2-6-9(12)10(8)11/h2,4,6,12H,3,5,7H2,1H3 Key: AXONCVPTTFHNOI-UHFFFAOYAE
- SMILES: CN1CCCC2=C1C(=CC=C2)O

Properties
Chemical formula	C_{10}H_{13}NO
Molar mass	163.220 g·mol^{−1}
- Except where otherwise noted, data are given for materials in their standard state (at 25 °C [77 °F], 100 kPa). verify (what is ?) Infobox references

Kairine is a derivative of tetrahydroquinoline which was first described by Wilhelm Fischer in 1883. Its name comes from the Greek kairos, meaning "the right time". It is an antipyretic, formerly used against typhoid fever, but now largely obsolete due to severe side effects. Both kairine and its N-ethyl homolog show similar antipyretic activity.

== See also ==
- 8-Hydroxyquinoline
