= 6-MAPDB =

Chemical compound

Clinical data
- Other names: 6-(2-(Methylamino)propyl)-2,3-dihydrobenzofuran; 1-(2,3-Dihydrobenzofuran-6-yl)-N-methylpropan-2-amine

Legal status
- Legal status: CA: Schedule I; DE: NpSG (Industrial and scientific use only); UK: Class B

Identifiers
- IUPAC name: 1-(2,3-dihydro-1-benzofuran-6-yl)-N-methylpropan-2-amine
- CAS Number: 1354631-81-4
- PubChem CID: 112500534
- ChemSpider: 32078889
- UNII: 1C25E596YG
- CompTox Dashboard (EPA): DTXSID301045393

Chemical and physical data
- Formula: C_{12}H_{17}NO
- Molar mass: 191.274 g·mol^{−1}
- 3D model (JSmol): Interactive image
- SMILES: CC(CC1=CC2=C(CCO2)C=C1)NC
- InChI: InChI=1S/C12H17NO/c1-9(13-2)7-10-3-4-11-5-6-14-12(11)8-10/h3-4,8-9,13H,5-7H2,1-2H3; Key:ZKMVEORLSJXOBD-UHFFFAOYSA-N

6-MAPDB, also known as 6-(2-(methylamino)propyl)-2,3-dihydrobenzofuran, is a chemical compound which may be an entactogen of the dihydrobenzofuran family. It is structurally related to drugs like 6-APDB and 6-MAPB, which have similar effects to MDMA and have been used as recreational drugs. 6-MAPDB has never been studied to determine its pharmacological activity, though it is the N-methyl derivative of 6-APDB which is known to be a selective serotonin releaser.

== Society and culture ==
=== Legal status ===
6-MAPDB was banned in the UK in June 2013 as a temporary class drug along with 9 other related compounds, despite having never been sold as a street drug itself. This was due to concerns that it would have similar effects to drugs such as 6-APB that had been widely sold already, and 6-MAPDB might therefore be likely to become used recreationally, if it were not banned preemptively.

== See also ==
- Substituted benzofuran
- 5-MAPDB
- 5-MAPDI
- IBF5MAP
