= Naphyrone =

Substituted cathinone stimulant drug

Clinical data
- Other names: O-2482; Naphthylpyrovalerone
- ATC code: none

Legal status
- Legal status: DE: Anlage II (Authorized trade only, not prescriptible); UK: Class B; US: Schedule I; Poland: I-P

Identifiers
- IUPAC name: (RS)-1-naphthalen-2-yl-2-pyrrolidin-1-ylpentan-1-one
- CAS Number: 850352-53-3 850352-11-3 (hydrochloride)
- PubChem CID: 11243002
- ChemSpider: 9418039
- UNII: 96ON64182B
- CompTox Dashboard (EPA): DTXSID301014192

Chemical and physical data
- Formula: C_{19}H_{23}NO
- Molar mass: 281.399 g·mol^{−1}
- 3D model (JSmol): Interactive image
- SMILES: CCCC(C(C1=CC2=C(C=C1)C=CC=C2)=O)N3CCCC3

Naphyrone, also known as O-2482 and naphthylpyrovalerone, is a stimulant drug of the cathinone and naphthylaminopropane families. It was derived from pyrovalerone and acts as a serotonin–norepinephrine–dopamine reuptake inhibitor (SNDRI). Naphyrone has been reported as a novel designer drug. No safety or toxicity data is available on the drug.

The drug has been marketed under the name "NRG-1," although only a minority of samples of substances sold under this name have been found to actually contain naphyrone, and even samples that proved to contain genuine β-naphyrone were in some cases also found to contain the 1-naphthyl isomer α-naphyrone in varying proportions, further confusing the reported effects profile.

== Use in the United Kingdom ==
Naphyrone emerged as a new legal high in the United Kingdom only months after the ban of similar drug mephedrone (which was also a cathinone derivative). Until July 2010 the substance was not controlled by the Misuse of Drugs Act 1971 and was therefore not illegal for someone to possess. The Medicines Act prevented naphyrone from being sold for human consumption, and therefore it was sometimes sold as 'pond cleaner' or as another substance not normally consumed by humans.

A study by researchers at Liverpool John Moores University found that only one out of ten products labelled as "NRG-1" actually contained naphyrone when they were subjected to laboratory analysis. Compounds found in products labelled NRG-1 included MDPV, flephedrone, mephedrone, butylone and caffeine, one product tested was inorganic in composition. In the case of an individual possessing a product labelled NRG-1 that contains MDPV or other illegal substances, they are in possession of a controlled substance.

On 12 July 2010, the Home Office announced that naphyrone had been banned and made a Class B drug, following a report from the Advisory Council on the Misuse of Drugs.

== Pharmacology ==
As a triple reuptake inhibitor, naphyrone has been shown in vitro to affect the reuptake of the neurotransmitters serotonin, dopamine and norepinephrine by interacting with the serotonin transporter (SERT), dopamine transporter (DAT), and norepinephrine transporter (NET).

One study found that the dissociation constant of naphyrone interacting with SERT is 33.1 nM ± 1.1, with DAT is 20.1 nM ± 7.1 and with NET is 136 nM ± 27. The concentration of naphyrone required to inhibit the transporters by 50% is 46.0 nM ± 5.5 for SERT, 40.0 nM ± 13 for DAT and 11.7 nM ± 0.9 for NET. Of a number of pyrovalerone analogues tested, naphyrone was found to be the only serotonin–norepinephrine–dopamine reuptake inhibitor found to be active at nM concentrations.

Some samples of β-naphyrone sold have also been found to contain the alternative isomer α-naphyrone, presumably produced accidentally as an impurity in synthesis. The in vitro data available in the scientific literature was all obtained using pure β-naphyrone, and the pharmacological properties of α-naphyrone are unknown, further complicating the pharmacological profile of this little-studied designer drug.

α-naphyrone

== Legal status ==
=== Finland ===
Naphyrone is scheduled in the "government decree on psychoactive substances banned from the consumer market".

== See also ==
- α-PVP
- α-Pyrrolidinopentiothiophenone (α-PVT)
- BMAPN
- HDEP-28
- HDMP-28 (methylnaphthidate)
- MDPV
- Naphthylisopropylamine
- Naphthylpropylaminopentane
- N,O-Dimethyl-4-(2-naphthyl)piperidine-3-carboxylate
- 2β-Propanoyl-3β-(2-naphthyl)-tropane (WF-23)
- O-2390
- Pronethalol
- Pyrovalerone
- TH-PVP
