= G-130 =

Chemical compound

Legal status
- Legal status: DE: NpSG (Industrial and scientific use only); UK: Under Psychoactive Substances Act

Identifiers
- IUPAC name: 2-phenyl-5,5-dimethylmorpholine
- CAS Number: 42013-48-9
- PubChem CID: 97711
- ChemSpider: 88190
- UNII: 785F2C727T
- CompTox Dashboard (EPA): DTXSID401032153 DTXSID40963342, DTXSID401032153

Chemical and physical data
- Formula: C_{12}H_{17}NO
- Molar mass: 191.274 g·mol^{−1}
- 3D model (JSmol): Interactive image
- SMILES: CC1(C)NCC(OC1)C2=CC=CC=C2
- InChI: InChI=1S/C12H17NO/c1-12(2)9-14-11(8-13-12)10-6-4-3-5-7-10/h3-7,11,13H,8-9H2,1-2H3; Key:KJUOROGOOZJYAI-UHFFFAOYSA-N

G-130 (GP-130, 2-Phenyl-5,5-dimethyltetrahydro-1,4-oxazine) is a drug with stimulant and anorectic effects, related to phenmetrazine.

== Structural analogs ==
Compounds related to G-130 and radafaxine were synthesized that behave as combined inhibitors of monoamine uptake and nicotinic acetylcholine receptors.

== Synthesis ==
Patent: Spanish Fepradinol patent:

Ex 1: 2 moles of 2-methyl-2-aminopropanol (aminomethyl propanol) (1) is reacted with 1 moles of styrene oxide (phenyloxirane) [96-09-3] (2) in 0.2 mole water.

Ex 2: Fepradinol [36981-91-6] [63075-47-8] (3) is treated with acid, to cyclize to the morpholine ring.

== See also ==
- 2-Phenyl-3,6-dimethylmorpholine
- 3-Fluorophenmetrazine
- 4-Methylphenmetrazine
- Phendimetrazine
- Manifaxine
