= 5-MAPDB =

Chemical compound

Clinical data
- Other names: 5-(2-(Methylamino)propyl)-2,3-dihydrobenzofuran; 1-(2,3-dihydrobenzofuran-5-yl)-N-methylpropan-2-amine

Legal status
- Legal status: AU: Analogue of MDMA; BR: Class F2 (Prohibited psychotropics); CA: Schedule I; DE: NpSG (Industrial and scientific use only); UK: Class B; US: Analogue to a Schedule I/II drug (MDMA)

Identifiers
- IUPAC name: 1-(2,3-dihydrobenzofuran-5-yl)-N-methylpropan-2-amine
- CAS Number: 1354631-78-9
- PubChem CID: 112500533
- ChemSpider: 52085108
- UNII: FS5Z21939Z
- CompTox Dashboard (EPA): DTXSID601045392

Chemical and physical data
- Formula: C_{12}H_{17}NO
- Molar mass: 191.274 g·mol^{−1}
- 3D model (JSmol): Interactive image
- SMILES: CC(NC)CC1=CC(CCO2)=C2C=C1
- InChI: InChI=1S/C12H17NO/c1-9(13-2)7-10-3-4-12-11(8-10)5-6-14-12/h3-4,8-9,13H,5-7H2,1-2H3; Key:PLQTZOCLUHHCOI-UHFFFAOYSA-N

5-MAPDB, also known as 5-(2-(methylamino)propyl)-2,3-dihydrobenzofuran, is an entactogen of the dihydrobenzofuran family. It is structurally related to drugs like 5-APDB and 5-MAPB, which have similar effects to MDMA and have been used as recreational drugs. 5-MAPDB has been studied to determine its pharmacological activity, and was found to be a relatively selective serotonin releaser, though with weaker actions as a releaser of other monoamines and 5-HT_{2} receptor family agonist, similar to older compounds such as 5-APDB.

== Society and culture ==
=== Legal status ===
5-MAPDB was banned in the UK in June 2013 as a temporary class drug along with 9 other related compounds, despite having never been sold as a street drug itself. This was due to concerns that it would have similar effects to drugs such as 5-APB that had been widely sold already, and 5-MAPDB might therefore be likely to become used recreationally also, if it were not banned preemptively.

== See also ==
- Substituted benzofuran
- 5-MAPDI
- 6-MAPDB
- IBF5MAP
