= IBF5MAP =

Chemical compound

Clinical data
- Other names: 5-MAPP
- ATC code: None

Identifiers
- IUPAC name: 1-(1,3-dihydro-2-benzofuran-5-yl)-N-methylpropan-2-amine
- CAS Number: 201407-56-9
- PubChem CID: 129932754
- ChemSpider: 60618490
- UNII: B48NCK44GU

Chemical and physical data
- Formula: C_{12}H_{17}NO
- Molar mass: 191.274 g·mol^{−1}
- 3D model (JSmol): Interactive image
- SMILES: CNC(Cc1ccc2c(c1)COC2)C
- InChI: InChI=1S/C12H17NO/c1-9(13-2)5-10-3-4-11-7-14-8-12(11)6-10/h3-4,6,9,13H,5,7-8H2,1-2H3; Key:RFIJNWGOFCMHHI-UHFFFAOYSA-N

IBF5MAP, also known as 5-MAPP, is a substituted amphetamine derivative which is structurally related to drugs such as MDMA and 5-MAPDI, though its pharmacology has not been studied in detail. It is a structural isomer of dihydrobenzofuran derivatives such as 5-MAPDB and 6-MAPDB, but instead has an unusual phthalane core structure.

== See also ==
- MDxx § Related compounds
- ODMA
- Citalopram
