= Ethcathinone =

Simulant designer drug

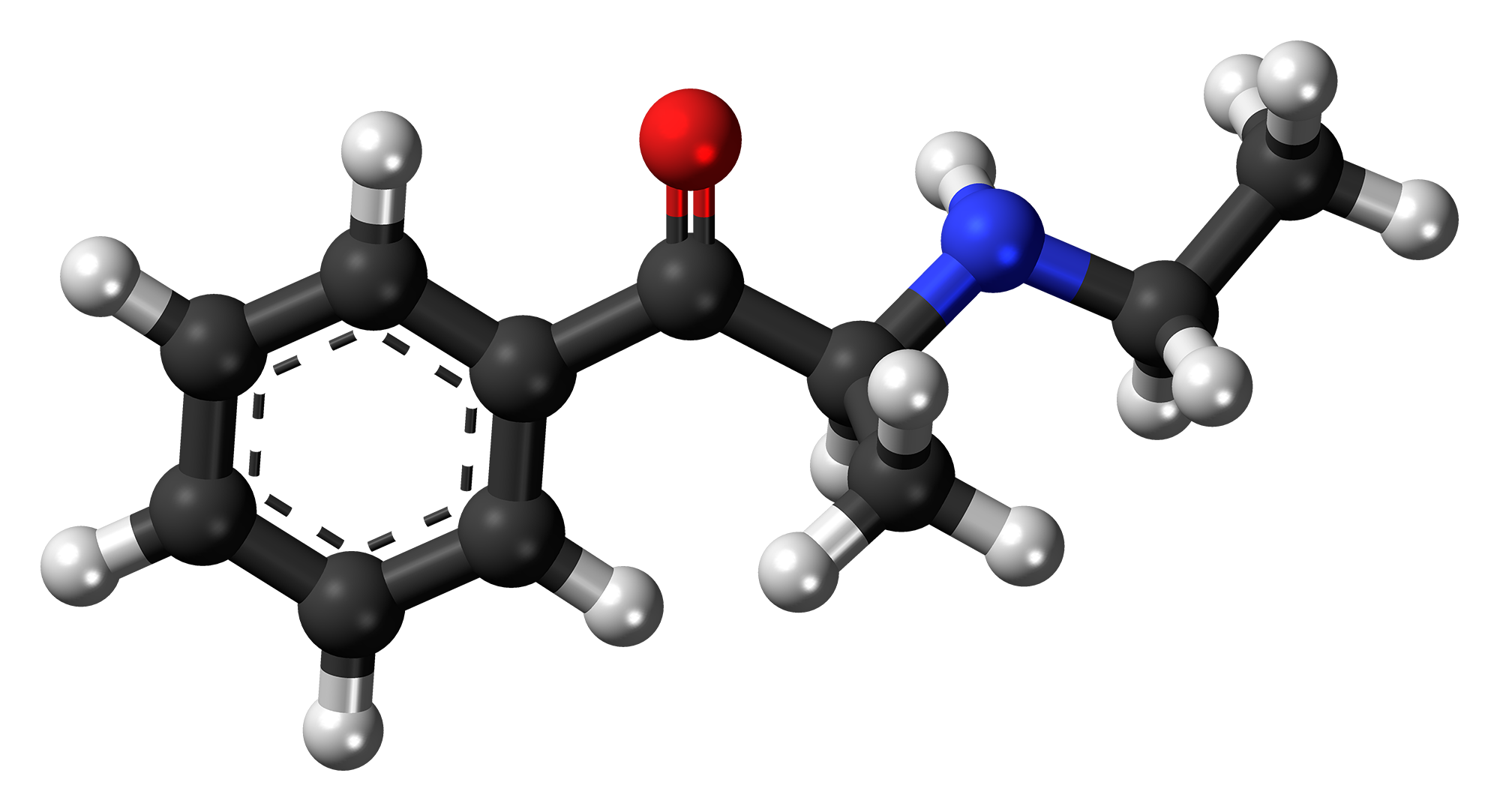

Clinical data
- Other names: N-Ethylcathinone; 2-Ethylaminopropiophenone
- Routes of administration: By mouth, intranasal
- Drug class: Norepinephrine releasing agent
- ATC code: none

Legal status
- Legal status: BR: Class F2 (Prohibited psychotropics); DE: Anlage II (Authorized trade only, not prescriptible); UK: Class B; US: Schedule I

Identifiers
- IUPAC name: (RS)-2-ethylamino-1-phenyl-propan-1-one
- CAS Number: 18259-37-5; hydrochloride: 51553-17-4
- PubChem CID: 458519
- IUPHAR/BPS: 7398
- ChemSpider: 403504
- UNII: HV3BCK77BB; hydrochloride: SQ59TT7X5R
- KEGG: C22705
- CompTox Dashboard (EPA): DTXSID70939595

Chemical and physical data
- Formula: C_{11}H_{15}NO
- Molar mass: 177.247 g·mol^{−1}
- 3D model (JSmol): Interactive image
- Chirality: Racemic mixture
- Melting point: 195 to 198 °C (383 to 388 °F) (hydrochloride)
- Boiling point: 272.3 °C (522.1 °F) at 760 mmHg (hydrochloride)
- SMILES: O=C(c1ccccc1)C(NCC)C
- InChI: InChI=1S/C11H15NO/c1-3-12-9(2)11(13)10-7-5-4-6-8-10/h4-9,12H,3H2,1-2H3; Key:LYMHIBZGTAPASQ-UHFFFAOYSA-N

Ethcathinone, also known as ethylpropion or ETH-CAT, is a stimulant drug of the phenethylamine, amphetamine, and cathinone chemical classes. It is an active metabolite of the prodrug diethylcathinone and is fully responsible for its effects. Ethcathinone has been identified as an ingredient in both quasi-legal "party pills", and, along with mephedrone, has also been reported as having been sold as "ecstasy" in the Australian city of Cairns.

== Pharmacology ==
The pharmacology for ethcathinone appeared alongside other psychostimulants in a paper by Rothman and Baumann in 2006. The predominant two modes of action for ethcathinone is as a moderately active releaser of noradrenaline (EC_{50} = 99.3 nM); however it is only a relatively weak inhibitor of dopamine reuptake (K_{i} = 1,014 nM).

Since diethylcathinone appears to be an inactive prodrug and only becomes active after it has been further metabolized to ethcathinone, it thereby would appear rational to consider that ethcathinone would also be expected to be N-dealkylated upon its consumption to the more active drug cathinone that is more able to reliably stimulate the release of dopamine. However, in contrast to diethylcathinone, ethcathinone is not universally considered to be a prodrug since (as is the case with tramadol, codeine, and MDMA) it is already active in its own right, therefore being excluded from the category by some of the more strict definitions.

== Legal status ==
Ethcathinone, along with mephedrone and flephedrone, was banned in Denmark on December 18, 2008.

As of October 2015 Ethcathinone is a controlled substance in China.

This compound is banned in the United States, being a positional isomer of mephedrone.

== See also ==
- Substituted cathinone
- Etilamfetamine
- Propylcathinone
