= Morforex =

Non-marketed appetite suppressant drug

Clinical data
- ATC code: None

Identifiers
- IUPAC name: 4-[2-[(α-Methylphenethyl)amino]ethyl]morpholine
- CAS Number: 41152-17-4
- PubChem CID: 3047774
- ChemSpider: 2310095
- UNII: O9J6ITY8UX
- CompTox Dashboard (EPA): DTXSID30866035

Chemical and physical data
- Formula: C_{15}H_{24}N_{2}O
- Molar mass: 248.370 g·mol^{−1}
- 3D model (JSmol): Interactive image
- SMILES: CC(Cc1ccccc1)NCCN2CCOCC2
- InChI: InChI=1S/C15H24N2O/c1-14(13-15-5-3-2-4-6-15)16-7-8-17-9-11-18-12-10-17/h2-6,14,16H,7-13H2,1H3; Key:ISEKMORYCCULAL-UHFFFAOYSA-N

Morforex (INN; Bo 637), also referable to as N-morpholinoethylamphetamine, is an anorectic which was never marketed.

It produces amphetamine as an active metabolite.

== Synthesis ==
Patent:

Amphetamine is reacted with N-Chloroethylmorpholine [3240-94-6] in the presence of IPA solvent.

== See also ==
- Fenethylline
- Phenmetrazine
