= 1-Naphthylmethcathinone =

Clinical data
- Other names: AMAPN
- Drug class: Serotonin–norepinephrine–dopamine releasing agent

Identifiers
- IUPAC name: 2-(methylamino)-1-naphthalen-1-ylpropan-1-one
- CAS Number: 854674-62-7
- PubChem CID: 112704364
- ChemSpider: 72080032
- UNII: DM7M36B5BS

Chemical and physical data
- Formula: C_{14}H_{15}NO
- Molar mass: 213.280 g·mol^{−1}
- 3D model (JSmol): Interactive image
- SMILES: CC(C(=O)C1=CC=CC2=CC=CC=C21)NC
- InChI: InChI=1S/C14H15NO/c1-10(15-2)14(16)13-9-5-7-11-6-3-4-8-12(11)13/h3-10,15H,1-2H3; Key:QIACKSHQBOUATI-UHFFFAOYSA-N

1-Naphthylmethcathinone (AMAPN) is a monoamine releasing agent of the cathinone and naphthylaminopropane families. It is an analogue of methcathinone in which the phenyl ring has been replaced with a 1-naphthalene ring.

The drug acts as a potent serotonin–norepinephrine–dopamine releasing agent (SNDRA). Its EC_{50} values for induction of monoamine release are 21.6 nM for serotonin and 55.2 nM for dopamine, whereas the EC_{50} for norepinephrine was not reported. However, AMAPN induced 92% release of norepinephrine at a concentration of 10,000 nM, indicating that it is an effective norepinephrine releaser as well.

== See also ==
- 1-Naphthylaminopropane (1-NAP)
- 2-Naphthylmethcathinone (BMAPN)
- 2,3-Methylenedioxyamphetamine (2,3-MDA)
- 2,3-Methylenedioxymethamphetamine (2,3-MDMA)
