= 2-Naphthylmethcathinone =

Substituted cathinone stimulant drug

BMAPN

Clinical data
- Other names: BMAPN; βk-Methamnetamine

Legal status
- Legal status: DE: NpSG (Industrial and scientific use only); UK: Under Psychoactive Substances Act

Identifiers
- IUPAC name: 2-(methylamino)-1-(naphthalene-2-yl) propan-1-one
- CAS Number: 109453-73-8
- PubChem CID: 112704365
- ChemSpider: 65998790
- UNII: DL8RX8N8NK
- CompTox Dashboard (EPA): DTXSID601337020

Chemical and physical data
- Formula: C_{14}H_{15}NO
- Molar mass: 213.280 g·mol^{−1}
- 3D model (JSmol): Interactive image
- SMILES: CC(C(=O)C1=CC2=CC=CC=C2C=C1)NC
- InChI: InChI=1S/C14H15NO/c1-10(15-2)14(16)13-8-7-11-5-3-4-6-12(11)9-13/h3-10,15H,1-2H3; Key:QIMNQDXLKHGANJ-UHFFFAOYSA-N

2-Naphthylmethcathinone (BMAPN), also known as βk-methamnetamine, is a stimulant drug of the cathinone and naphthylaminopropane families. It inhibits dopamine reuptake and has rewarding and reinforcing properties in animal studies. It is banned under drug analogue legislation in a number of jurisdictions. The drug was at one point marketed under the name NRG-3, although only a minority of samples of substances sold under this name have been found to actually contain BMAPN, with most such samples containing mixtures of other cathinone derivatives.

Monoamine release of BMAPN and related agents (EC_{50}, nM)
Compound	NE	DA	5-HT	Ref
d-Amphetamine	6.6–10.2	5.8–24.8	698–1,765	
Naphthylaminopropane (NAP; PAL-287)	11.1	12.6	3.4	
d-Methamphetamine	12.3–14.3	8.5–40.4	736–1,292	
Methylnaphthylaminopropane (MNAP; PAL-1046)	34	10	13	
l-Methcathinone	13.1	14.8	1,772	
2-Naphthylmethcathinone (BMAPN; βk-MNAP)	94% at 10 μM	34	27	
d-Ethylamphetamine	28.8	44.1	333.0	
Ethylnaphthylaminopropane (ENAP; PAL-1045)	137	46 ^{a}	12 ^{a}	
Phenmetrazine	29–50.4	70–131	7,765–>10,000	
Naphthylmetrazine (PAL-704)	203	111	RI (105)	
Notes: The smaller the value, the more strongly the drug releases the neurotransmitter. The assays were done in rat brain synaptosomes and human potencies may be different. See also Monoamine releasing agent § Activity profiles for a larger table with more compounds. Footnotes: ^{a} ENAP is a partial releaser of serotonin (E_{max} = 66%) and dopamine (E_{max} = 78%). Refs:

== See also ==
- 1-Naphthylmethcathinone (AMAPN)
- βk-Ephenidine
- Methamnetamine
- Methylnaphthidate
- Methylone
- Naphyrone
- WF-23
