= 2-Phenylmorpholine =

Clinical data
- Other names: PAL-632; PAL632
- Drug class: Norepinephrine–dopamine releasing agent; Psychostimulant

Identifiers
- IUPAC name: 2-phenylmorpholine
- CAS Number: 23972-41-0
- PubChem CID: 91101
- ChemSpider: 82261
- ChEMBL: ChEMBL4069068
- CompTox Dashboard (EPA): DTXSID70946825

Chemical and physical data
- Formula: C_{10}H_{13}NO
- Molar mass: 163.220 g·mol^{−1}
- 3D model (JSmol): Interactive image
- SMILES: C1COC(CN1)C2=CC=CC=C2
- InChI: InChI=1S/C10H13NO/c1-2-4-9(5-3-1)10-8-11-6-7-12-10/h1-5,10-11H,6-8H2; Key:ZLNGFYDJXZZFJP-UHFFFAOYSA-N

2-Phenylmorpholine (code name PAL-632) is the parent compound of the substituted phenylmorpholine class of compounds. Examples of 2-phenylmorpholine derivatives (i.e., substituted phenylmorpholines) include phenmetrazine (3-methyl-2-phenylmorpholine), phendimetrazine ((2S,3S)-3,4-dimethyl-2-phenylmorpholine), and pseudophenmetrazine ((2RS,3SR)-3-methyl-2-phenylmorpholine), which are monoamine releasing agents (MRAs) and psychostimulants. 2-Phenylmorpholine itself is a potent norepinephrine–dopamine releasing agent (NDRA) and hence may act as a stimulant similarly.

Monoamine release of 2-phenylmorpholine and related agents (EC_{50}, nM)
Compound	NE	DA	5-HT	Ref
Phenethylamine	10.9	39.5	>10,000	
Dextroamphetamine	6.6–10.2	5.8–24.8	698–1,765	
Dextromethamphetamine	12.3–14.3	8.5–40.4	736–1,292	
2-Phenylmorpholine	79	86	20,260	
Phenmetrazine	29–50.4	70–131	7,765–>10,000	
Phendimetrazine	>10,000	>10,000	>100,000	
Pseudophenmetrazine	514	>10,000 (RI)	>10,000	
Notes: The smaller the value, the more strongly the drug releases the neurotransmitter. The assays were done in rat brain synaptosomes and human potencies may be different. See also Monoamine releasing agent § Activity profiles for a larger table with more compounds. Refs:
