= Naphthylaminopropane =

Chemical compound

Clinical data
- Other names: NAP; Naphthylisopropylamine; NIPA; PAL-287; Naphetamine; Amnetamine; 1-(2-Naphthyl)-2-aminopropane; beta-Methylnapthylethylamine; β-Methylnaphthylethylamine; 1-(β-Naphthyl)-2-aminopropane
- Routes of administration: Oral
- ATC code: None

Legal status
- Legal status: In general: uncontrolled

Identifiers
- IUPAC name: 1-(Naphthalen-2-yl)propan-2-amine
- CAS Number: 18085-03-5
- PubChem CID: 10219723
- ChemSpider: 8395215
- UNII: 53PF675WUK
- ChEMBL: ChEMBL471839
- CompTox Dashboard (EPA): DTXSID70630474

Chemical and physical data
- Formula: C_{13}H_{15}N
- Molar mass: 185.270 g·mol^{−1}
- 3D model (JSmol): Interactive image
- SMILES: CC(N)Cc2ccc1ccccc1c2
- InChI: InChI=1S/C13H15N/c1-10(14)8-11-6-7-12-4-2-3-5-13(12)9-11/h2-7,9-10H,8,14H2,1H3; Key:UPQSZFKXKRKCGZ-UHFFFAOYSA-N

Naphthylaminopropane (NAP; code name PAL-287), also known as naphthylisopropylamine (NIPA), is an experimental drug of the amphetamine and naphthylaminopropane families that was under investigation for the treatment of alcohol and stimulant addiction.

== Pharmacology ==
=== Pharmacodynamics ===
==== Activities ====
Naphthylaminopropane is a serotonin–norepinephrine–dopamine releasing agent (SNDRA). Its EC_{50} values for induction of monoamine release are 3.4 nM for serotonin, 11.1 nM for norepinephrine, and 12.6 nM for dopamine.

The drug is also an agonist of the serotonin 5-HT_{2A}, 5-HT_{2B}, and 5-HT_{2C} receptors. Its EC_{50} values are 466 nM at the serotonin 5-HT_{2A} receptor, 40 nM at the serotonin 5-HT_{2B} receptor, and 2.3 nM at the serotonin 5-HT_{2C} receptor. It is a full agonist of the serotonin 5-HT_{2A} and 5-HT_{2B} receptors and a weak partial agonist of the serotonin 5-HT_{2C} receptor (E_{max} = 20%).

Naphthylaminopropane has been found to act as a potent monoamine oxidase A (MAO-A) inhibitor, with an IC_{50} of 420 nM. This is similar to the potency of the well-known MAO-A inhibitors para-methoxyamphetamine (PMA) and 4-methylthioamphetamine (4-MTA).

Monoamine release of naphthylaminopropane and related agents (EC_{50}, nM)
| Compound | NE | DA | 5-HT | Ref |
|---|---|---|---|---|
| d-Amphetamine | 6.6–10.2 | 5.8–24.8 | 698–1,765 | |
| Naphthylaminopropane (NAP; PAL-287) | 11.1 | 12.6 | 3.4 | |
| d-Methamphetamine | 12.3–14.3 | 8.5–40.4 | 736–1,292 | |
| Methylnaphthylaminopropane (MNAP; PAL-1046) | 34 | 10 | 13 | |
| l-Methcathinone | 13.1 | 14.8 | 1,772 | |
| 2-Naphthylmethcathinone (BMAPN; βk-MNAP) | 94% at 10 μM | 34 | 27 | |
| d-Ethylamphetamine | 28.8 | 44.1 | 333.0 | |
| Ethylnaphthylaminopropane (ENAP; PAL-1045) | 137 | 46 ^{a} | 12 ^{a} | |
| Phenmetrazine | 29–50.4 | 70–131 | 7,765–>10,000 | |
| Naphthylmetrazine (PAL-704) | 203 | 111 | RI (105) | |
Notes: The smaller the value, the more strongly the drug releases the neurotransmitter. The assays were done in rat brain synaptosomes and human potencies may be different. See also Monoamine releasing agent § Activity profiles for a larger table with more compounds. Footnotes: ^{a} ENAP is a partial releaser of serotonin (E_{max} = 66%) and dopamine (E_{max} = 78%). Refs:

==== Effects ====
In animal studies, naphthylaminopropane was shown to reduce cocaine self-administration, yet produced relatively weak stimulant effects when administered alone, being a much less effective stimulant than dextroamphetamine. Further research was being conducted in primates to see if the drug would be a useful substitute for treating drug addiction in humans.

An important observation is that in behavioral studies, rodents would consistently self-administer selective norepinephrine–dopamine releasing agents (NDRAs) like dextroamphetamine, yet compounds that also potently release serotonin like naphthylaminopropane would not be self-administered. In addition to the drug's effects on self-administration, the available evidence suggests that the locomotor activation caused by dopamine releasers is also dampened when they additionally induce serotonin release. Notably, despite potent dopamine release induction, naphthylaminopropane produces weak or no locomotor activation in rodents.

The high affinity of naphthylaminopropane for the serotonin 5-HT_{2C} receptor meant that it might function as an appetite suppressant and was being considered for possible clinical use for this indication (i.e., weight loss). However, concerns were raised over the affinity of the drug for the serotonin 5-HT_{2B} receptor, since some of the more serious side effects of the serotonin-releasing weight loss drug fenfluramine were linked to activation of this receptor. It is uncertain, although was considered unlikely per the researchers who developed the drug, that activation of the serotonin 5-HT_{2A} and 5-HT_{2B} receptors occurs to a significant degree in vivo.

== Chemistry ==
Naphthylaminopropane was first described in the scientific literature by 1939. The drug is also known as 2-naphthylaminopropane (2-NAP) or β-naphthylaminopropane, and it was described along with its positional isomer 1-naphthylaminopropane (1-NAP; α-naphthylaminopropane). Both 2-NAP and 1-NAP failed to substitute for dextroamphetamine in rodent drug discrimination tests, suggesting that they lack psychostimulant-like effects. The β-keto and N-methyl analogue of 2-NAP has been assessed and was found to act as a potent SNDRA similarly to naphthylaminopropane.

Naphthylaminopropane is structurally related to certain rigid analogues of amphetamine. Rigid amphetamine analogues include 2-aminotetralin (2-AT), 2-amino-1,2-dihydronaphthalene (2-ADN), 1-phenylpiperazine (1-PP), 2-aminoindane (2-AI), 6-AB, and 7-AB.

A few derivatives of naphthylaminopropane have been developed or have appeared, including methamnetamine (N-methylnaphthylaminopropane; MNAP; PAL-1046), N-ethylnaphthylaminopropane (ENAP; PAL-1045), and BMAPN (βk-methamnetamine; β-keto-MNAP; 2-naphthylmethcathinone). Like naphthylaminopropane, these derivatives also act as potent monoamine releasing agents, including of serotonin, norepinephrine, and/or dopamine.

== See also ==
- Substituted naphthylethylamine
- 5-APDI
- 6-APT
- HDEP-28
- HDMP-28
- Naphthylmetrazine
- Naphyrone
- Naphthylpropylaminopentane
