= Manifaxine =

Chemical compound

Clinical data
- Other names: GW-320,659; GW-320659; GW320659
- Routes of administration: Oral
- Drug class: Norepinephrine–dopamine reuptake inhibitor
- ATC code: None

Identifiers
- IUPAC name: (2S,3S,5R)-2-(3,5-difluorophenyl)-3,5-dimethylmorpholin-2-ol
- CAS Number: 135306-39-7
- PubChem CID: 60829
- ChemSpider: 54816
- UNII: J8IE53G2IV
- CompTox Dashboard (EPA): DTXSID60928953

Chemical and physical data
- Formula: C_{12}H_{15}F_{2}NO_{2}
- Molar mass: 243.254 g·mol^{−1}
- 3D model (JSmol): Interactive image
- SMILES: C[C@@H]1CO[C@]([C@@H](N1)C)(C2=CC(=CC(=C2)F)F)O
- InChI: InChI=1S/C12H15F2NO2/c1-7-6-17-12(16,8(2)15-7)9-3-10(13)5-11(14)4-9/h3-5,7-8,15-16H,6H2,1-2H3/t7-,8+,12-/m1/s1; Key:OZGPVYJHWWPEFT-RGNHYFCHSA-N

Manifaxine (developmental code name GW-320,659) is a norepinephrine–dopamine reuptake inhibitor (NDRI) developed by GlaxoSmithKline through structural modification of radafaxine, an isomer of hydroxybupropion and one of the active metabolites of bupropion. Manifaxine was researched for treatment of attention deficit hyperactivity disorder (ADHD) and obesity and was found to be safe, reasonably effective, and well-tolerated for both applications. However, no results were reported following these initial trials and development was discontinued.

== Chemistry ==
=== Synthesis ===
Synthesis: Patent: See also:

The Grignard reaction between 3,5-difluorobenzonitrile (1) and ethylmagnesium bromide gives 3,5-difluoropropiophenone (2). Halogenation with molecular bromine occurs at the alpha-keto position providing 2-bromo-3',5'-difluoropropiophenone (3). Intermolecular ring formation with DL-alaninol (2-aminopropanol) completes the synthesis of manifaxine (4).

== See also ==
- Substituted cathinone
- Substituted phenylmorpholine
- 3,5-Difluoromethcathinone
- 3-Fluorophenmetrazine
