= Methcathinone =

Psychoactive stimulant

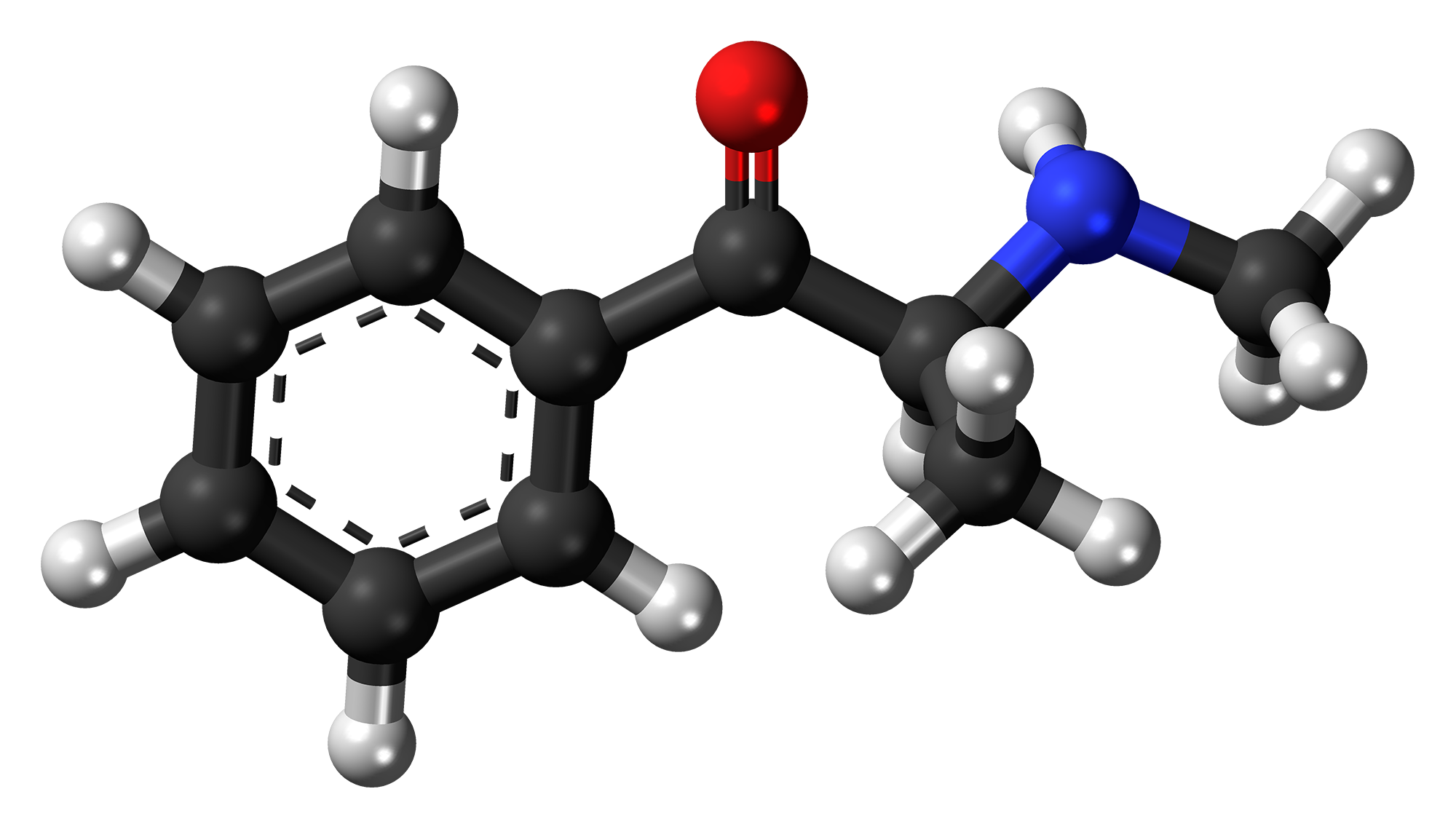

Clinical data
- Pronunciation: /ˌmɛθˈkæθɪˌnoʊn/
- Other names: MC; METHCATH; Ephedrone; β-Ketomethamphetamine; β-Keto-N-methylamphetamine; N-Methylcathinone; 2-(Methylamino)propanophenone
- Routes of administration: Oral, insufflation, inhalation, intravenous injection
- Drug class: Stimulant; Euphoriant; Norepinephrine-dopamine releasing agent
- ATC code: None

Legal status
- Legal status: AU: S9 (Prohibited substance); BR: Class F2 (Prohibited psychotropics); CA: Schedule III; DE: Anlage I (Authorized scientific use only); UK: Class B; US: Schedule I; UN: Psychotropic Schedule I

Pharmacokinetic data
- Excretion: Urine

Identifiers
- IUPAC name: (RS)-2-(methylamino)-1-phenyl-propan-1-one
- CAS Number: 5650-44-2 (R form) 49656-78-2 (R form · HCl) 112117-24-5 (S form) 66514-93-0 (S form · HCl)
- PubChem CID: 1576
- DrugBank: DB15339
- ChemSpider: 1519
- UNII: 386QA522QG; S2Q5GUH10H
- KEGG: C22263
- ChEBI: CHEBI:149677
- ChEMBL: ChEMBL4070364
- CompTox Dashboard (EPA): DTXSID30863589
- ECHA InfoCard: 100.024.630

Chemical and physical data
- Formula: C_{10}H_{13}NO
- Molar mass: 163.220 g·mol^{−1}
- 3D model (JSmol): Interactive image
- Chirality: Racemic mixture
- SMILES: O=C(c1ccccc1)C(NC)C
- InChI: InChI=1S/C10H13NO/c1-8(11-2)10(12)9-6-4-3-5-7-9/h3-8,11H,1-2H3; Key:LPLLVINFLBSFRP-UHFFFAOYSA-N

Methcathinone, also known as ephedrone, N-methylcathinone, or β-keto-N-methylamphetamine, as well as by nicknames such as "cat" or "jeff" or "catnip" or "M-Kat" or "kat" or "intash", is a stimulant and alkaloid of the cathinone family. It is used as a recreational drug due to its stimulant and euphoric effects and is considered to be addictive, with both physical and psychological withdrawal occurring if its use is discontinued after prolonged or high-dosage administration. It is usually snorted, but can be smoked, injected, or taken orally.

Methcathinone is listed as a Schedule I controlled substance by the Convention on Psychotropic Substances and the United States' Controlled Substances Act, and as such it is not considered to be safe or effective in the treatment, diagnosis, prevention, or cure of any disease, and has no approved medical use. Possession and distribution of methcathinone for the purpose of human consumption is illegal under any/all circumstances in the United States and is either illegal or highly regulated in most jurisdictions worldwide.

== Use and effects ==
Methcathinone is a stimulant with similar effects to those of methamphetamine. The effects have also been compared to those of cocaine, since it commonly causes hypertension (elevated blood pressure) and tachycardia (elevated heart rate). The drug produces stimulant effects and strong euphoria at doses of 50 to 100 mg orally. Individuals with high tolerance may consume many hundreds of milligrams in 24-hour periods.

Anecdotal reports have provided some information on patterns of methcathinone use. The most common route of administration is via nasal insufflation (snorting). Other routes of administration include oral, IV injection and smoking. The effects of methcathinone usually last from four to six hours.

Reported effects of methcathinone include:

- Feelings of euphoria
- Increased alertness
- Slurred speech
- Shaking of the limbs
- Increased heart rate
- Increased blood pressure, risk of stroke or heart attack
- Increased empathy and sense of communication
- Both decreased and increased sexual function and desire
- Bruxism

Methcathinone binges resemble amphetamine binges in that the user may not sleep or eat, and takes in little in the way of liquids. The methcathinone binge is followed by long periods of sleep, excess eating, long-lasting nosebleeds (insufflation of methcathinone is corrosive to the nasal mucosa in the same manner as methamphetamine) and, in some cases, depression.

== Adverse effects ==
Side effects of methcathinone include sympathomimetic effects like increased heart rate and blood pressure. Users can easily forget to consume fluids leading to increased thirst and dehydration. Methcathinone can be highly psychologically addictive, and can produce a methamphetamine-like withdrawal.

Injecting this substance has been associated with symptoms similar to those seen in patients with Parkinson's disease (manganism) due to the compound manganese dioxide which is a byproduct of synthesis with permanganate.

== Pharmacology ==
=== Pharmacodynamics ===
Monoamine release of methcathinone and related agents (EC_{50}, nM)
Compound	NE	DA	5-HT	Ref
Phenethylamine	10.9	39.5	>10,000	
Amphetamine	ND	ND	ND	ND
Dextroamphetamine	6.6–7.2	5.8–24.8	698–1,765	
Levoamphetamine	9.5	27.7	ND	
Methamphetamine	ND	ND	ND	ND
Dextromethamphetamine	12.3–13.8	8.5–24.5	736–1,292	
Levomethamphetamine	28.5	416	4,640	
Cathinone	23.6–25.6	34.8–83.1	6,100–7,595	
D-Cathinone	72.0	184	>10,000	
L-Cathinone	12.4–28	18–24.6	2,366–9,267	
Methcathinone	22–26.1	12.5–49.9	2,592–5,853	
D-Methcathinone	ND	ND	IA	
L-Methcathinone	13.1	14.8	1,772	
Notes: The smaller the value, the more strongly the drug releases the neurotransmitter. The assays were done in rat brain synaptosomes and human potencies may be different. See also Monoamine releasing agent § Activity profiles for a larger table with more compounds. Refs:

Methcathinone is a norepinephrine–dopamine releasing agent (NDRA). Methcathinone has very strong affinities for the dopamine transporter (DAT) and the norepinephrine transporter (NET). Its affinity for the serotonin transporter (SERT) is less than that of methamphetamine.

Methcathinone increases spontaneous rodent locomotor activity, In rodent drug discrimination studies, methcathinone evokes responses similar to those induced by both dextroamphetamine and cocaine. In preclinical studies, methcathinone produces a misuse potential profile similar to that of the amphetamines.

The C=O bond at the R_{β}-position (directly right of the phenyl ring) is slightly polar, and as a result the drug does not cross the lipid blood–brain barrier quite as well as amphetamine. Nevertheless, it is a potent central nervous system (CNS) stimulant and dopamine reuptake inhibitor. Chronic high dosage use may result in acute mental confusion ranging from mild paranoia to psychosis. These symptoms typically disappear quickly if use is stopped.

== Chemistry ==
Methcathinone is a β-keto-N-methylamphetamine and is closely related to the naturally occurring compounds, cathinone and cathine. It is also very closely related to methamphetamine, differing by only the β-ketone substituent and differing from amphetamine by both a keto and N-methyl substituent. Its carbon skeleton is identical to pseudoephedrine and methamphetamine. It differs from pseudoephedrine in that the hydroxyl beta to the aromatic ring is oxidized to a ketone.

Methcathinone possesses a chiral carbon atom, and therefore two enantiomers are possible. When it is made semi-synthetically from pseudo/ephedrine as a starting material, then only a single enantiomer is produced. Given that the chiral center has an alpha hydrogen and adjacent the carbonyl group, the molecule will racemize in solution via an enol intermediate. This process is known as keto–enol tautomerism.

Methcathinone as free base is very unstable; it easily loses its ketone group, which is substituted with a hydroxyl group, yielding pseudoephedrine, in the reverse of the typical synthesis reaction. Structurally, this occurs when the C=O bond at the Rβ-position is converted into a C-OH bond. Additionally, a dimerization reaction has been observed in solutions of freebase methcathinone, which yields a biologically inactive compound.

=== Synthesis ===
Methcathinone production utilizes the oxidation of pseudoephedrine or ephedrine, the former being preferred because of much higher yields achieved. Oxidation of pseudoephedrine to methcathinone requires little chemistry experience, making it (relatively) easy to synthesize. Potassium permanganate (KMnO_{4}) in an acidic solution is most commonly used as the oxidant.

In clandestine laboratories, synthesizing methcathinone using potassium permanganate is considered undesirable because of the low yields and the high toxicity of this oxidant; however, if done in a proper laboratory using the proper procedures potassium permanganate can be a high-yielding reactant. A method that yields more methcathinone is oxidizing (pseudo)ephedrine with chromium (VI) compounds, which are far more toxic than permanganate compounds.

=== Analogues ===
Analogues of methcathinone include methamphetamine, cathinone, cathine, methylone (MDMC), mephedrone (4-MMC), metaphedrone (3-MMC), and α-methylmethcathinone, among many others.

== History ==
Methcathinone was first synthesized in 1928 in the United States and was patented by Parke-Davis in 1957. It was used in the Soviet Union during the 1930s and 1940s as an antidepressant (under the name Эфедрон—ephedrone). Methcathinone has long been used as a drug of abuse in the Soviet Union and Russia.

Circa 1994, the United States government recommended to the UN Secretary-General that methcathinone should be listed as a Schedule I controlled substance in the Convention on Psychotropic Substances. In 1995, following US advice, China added the drug to its list of prohibited substances and discontinued its pharmaceutical use.

It is currently a Schedule III drug in Canada along with codeine, anabolic steroids, and testosterone. It is legal to possess in Canada, but illegal to purchase. Methcathinone used to have the nick-name "bath salts", to avoid restrictions on importation.

== Society and culture ==
=== Legal status ===
==== International ====
The United Nations Convention on Psychotropic Substances lists methcathinone as a Schedule I substance which restricts its use for government-approved medical and scientific uses.

==== Australia ====
Methcathinone is a Schedule 9 prohibited substance in Australia under the Poisons Standard (February 2021). A Schedule 9 substance is defined as a substance which may be abused or misused, the manufacture, possession, sale or use of which should be prohibited by law except when required for medical or scientific research, or for analytical, teaching or training purposes with approval of Commonwealth and/or State or Territory Health Authorities.

==== United Kingdom ====
In the United Kingdom, methcathinone is listed as a Class B drug with no clinical uses.

==== United States ====
In the United States, methcathinone is listed as a Schedule I drug, for which there is no clinical use.

==== Netherlands ====
In the Netherlands, methcathinone is listed as a Level I substance of the Opium Law, for which there is no clinical use.

==== Finland ====
Methcathinone is illegal in Finland. It is scheduled in the "government decree on substances, preparations and plants considered to be narcotic drugs".

== See also ==
- Substituted cathinone
