= Phendimetrazine =

Pharmaceutical drug

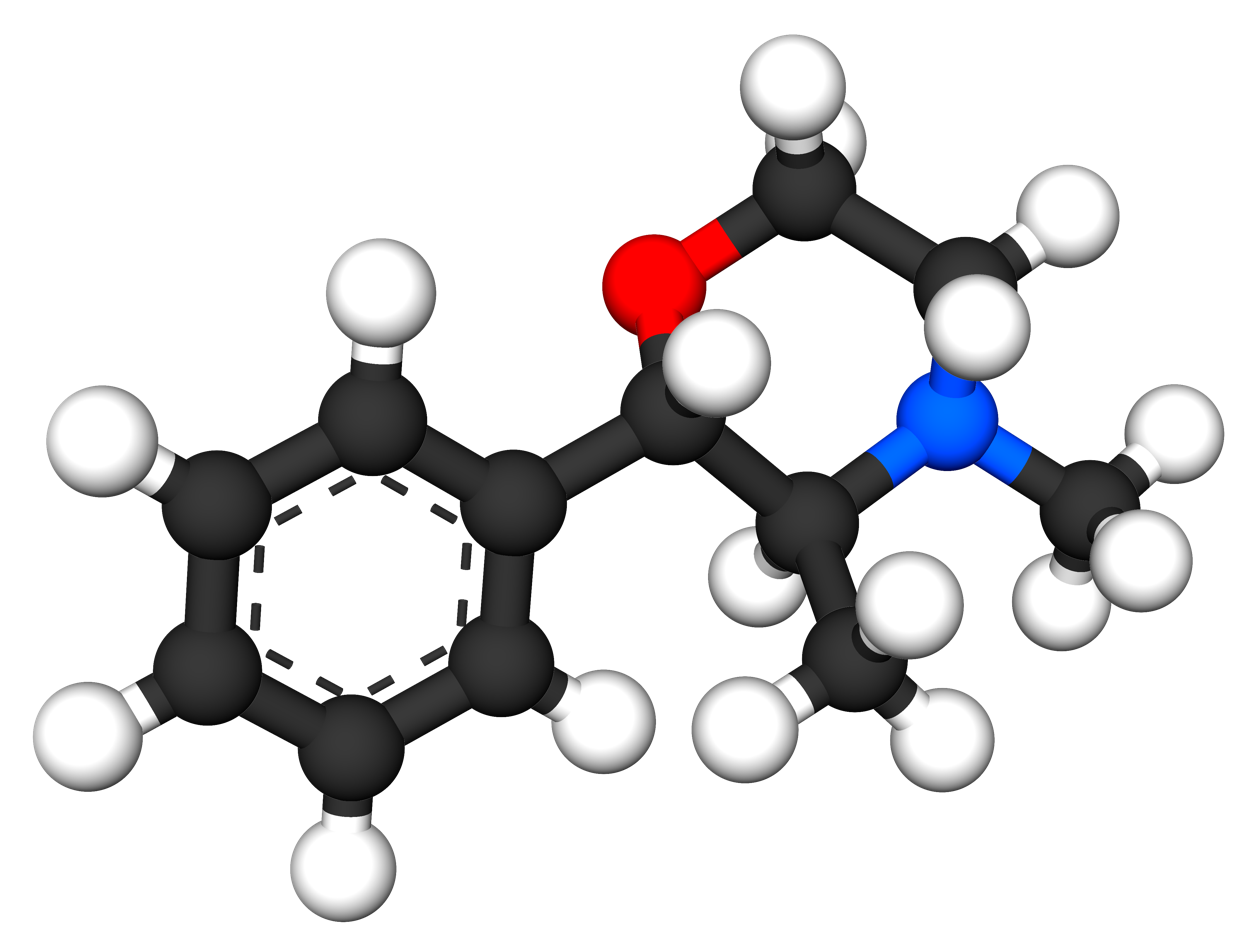

Clinical data
- Trade names: Bontril
- Other names: Mephenmetrazine; (2S,3S)-3,4-Dimethyl-2-phenylmorpholine
- AHFS/Drugs.com: Monograph
- Routes of administration: Oral
- ATC code: None

Legal status
- Legal status: BR: Class B2 (Anorectic drugs); CA: Schedule IV; DE: Anlage II (Authorized trade only, not prescriptible); US: Schedule III

Pharmacokinetic data
- Metabolism: Liver
- Elimination half-life: 19–24 hours
- Excretion: Urinary elimination

Identifiers
- IUPAC name: 3,4-dimethyl-2-phenylmorpholine
- CAS Number: 634-03-7
- PubChem CID: 30487
- DrugBank: DB01579
- ChemSpider: 28295
- UNII: AB2794W8KV
- KEGG: D08347
- ChEMBL: ChEMBL1615439
- CompTox Dashboard (EPA): DTXSID1023447
- ECHA InfoCard: 100.010.186

Chemical and physical data
- Formula: C_{12}H_{17}NO
- Molar mass: 191.274 g·mol^{−1}
- 3D model (JSmol): Interactive image
- SMILES: C[C@H]1[C@@H](OCCN1C)C2=CC=CC=C2
- InChI: InChI=1S/C12H17NO/c1-10-12(14-9-8-13(10)2)11-6-4-3-5-7-11/h3-7,10,12H,8-9H2,1-2H3/t10-,12+/m0/s1; Key:MFOCDFTXLCYLKU-CMPLNLGQSA-N

Phendimetrazine, sold under the brand name Bontril among others, is a stimulant medication of the morpholine chemical class used as an appetite suppressant.

== Pharmacology ==
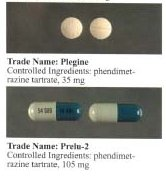
Phendimetrazine tablets and capsules

Phendimetrazine functions as a prodrug of phenmetrazine; approximately 30% of an oral dose is converted into it. Phendimetrazine can essentially be thought of as an extended-release formulation of phenmetrazine with less potential for abuse. Phendimetrazine is an anorectic drug which acts as a norepinephrine–dopamine releasing agent (NDRA).

As an amphetamine congener, its structure incorporates the backbone of methamphetamine, a potent CNS stimulant. While the addition of an N-methyl group to amphetamine significantly increases its potency and bioavailability, methylation of phenmetrazine renders the compound virtually inactive. However, phendimetrazine is a prodrug for phenmetrazine which acts as the active metabolite. Phendimetrazine possesses preferable pharmacokinetics over phenmetrazine as a therapeutic agent because its metabolization by demethylases produces a more steady and prolonged exposure of active drug within the body. This decreases abuse potential as the peak blood-concentration of active phenmetrazine that's produced from a single dose of phendimetrazine is lower than a single therapeutically equivalent dose of phenmetrazine.

Indicated as a short-term secondary treatment for exogenous obesity, phendimetrazine immediate-release 35 mg tablets are typically consumed one hour before meals, not to exceed three doses daily. Phendimetrazine is also manufactured as a 105 mg extended-release capsule for once daily dosing, typically consumed 30 to 60 minutes before a morning meal. Whereas the immediate-release formulation has a maximum daily dosage of 210 mg (6 tablets), the extended-release capsules have a maximum daily dosage of 105 mg (one capsule).

== Legality ==
According to the List of Psychotropic Substances under International Control published by the International Narcotics Control Board, phendimetrazine is a Schedule III controlled substance under the Convention on Psychotropic Substances.

== Synthesis ==
The reaction between 2-bromopropiophenone 1 and N-methylethanolamine 2 produces the intermediate of 3a/b in equilibrium, which is reductively cyclized using formic acid to yield phendimetrazine.

Scheme of phendimetrazine synthesis

== Society and culture ==
=== Brand names ===
It is sold under various brand names including Bontril, Bontril PDM, Adipost, Anorex-SR, Appecon, Melfiat, Obezine, Phendiet, Plegine, Prelu-2, and Statobex.
