= Phenmetrazine =

Discontinued anorexiant

- Skeletal formula of phenmetrazine

- Ball-and-stick model of phenmetrazine

Clinical data
- Trade names: Preludin, others
- Other names: Fenmetrazine; Oxazimedrine; Phenmetrazin; 3-Methyl-2-phenylmorpholine; 2-Phenyl-3-methylmorpholine; 3-Methyl-2-phenyltetrahydro-2H-1,4-oxazine; PAL-55; PAL55; Prellies
- Routes of administration: By mouth, Intravenous, insufflation, inhalation, rectal
- Drug class: Norepinephrine–dopamine releasing agent; Stimulant; Anoretic
- ATC code: None

Legal status
- Legal status: AU: S8 (Controlled drug); BR: Class A3 (Psychoactive drugs); CA: Schedule IV; DE: Anlage II (Authorized trade only, not prescriptible); UK: Class B; US: Schedule II; UN: Psychotropic Schedule II; SE: Förteckning II

Pharmacokinetic data
- Elimination half-life: 16–31 hours
- Excretion: Kidney

Identifiers
- IUPAC name: 3-methyl-2-phenylmorpholine
- CAS Number: 134-49-6
- PubChem CID: 4762
- DrugBank: DB00830
- ChemSpider: 4598
- UNII: XA501VL3VR
- KEGG: C07432
- ChEBI: CHEBI:8067
- ChEMBL: ChEMBL1201208
- CompTox Dashboard (EPA): DTXSID5023455
- ECHA InfoCard: 100.004.677

Chemical and physical data
- Formula: C_{11}H_{15}NO
- Molar mass: 177.247 g·mol^{−1}
- 3D model (JSmol): Interactive image
- SMILES: CC1C(C2=CC=CC=C2)OCCN1
- InChI: InChI=1S/C11H15NO/c1-9-11(13-8-7-12-9)10-5-3-2-4-6-10/h2-6,9,11-12H,7-8H2,1H3; Key:OOBHFESNSZDWIU-UHFFFAOYSA-N

Phenmetrazine, sold under the brand name Preludin among others, is a stimulant drug first synthesized in 1952 and originally used as an appetite suppressant, but withdrawn from the market in the 1980s due to widespread misuse. It was initially replaced by its analogue phendimetrazine (under the brand name Prelu-2) which functions as a prodrug to phenmetrazine, but now it is rarely prescribed, due to concerns of misuse and addiction. Chemically, phenmetrazine is a substituted amphetamine containing a morpholine ring or a substituted phenylmorpholine.

== Medical uses ==
Phenmetrazine has been used as an appetite suppressant for purposes of weight loss. It was used therapeutically for this indication at a dosage of 25 mg two or three times per day (or 50–75 mg/day total) in adults. Phenmetrazine has been found to produce similar weight loss to dextroamphetamine in people with obesity.

In addition to its appetite suppressant effects, phenmetrazine has been shown to produce very similar subjective psychostimulant effects to those of amphetamine and methamphetamine in clinical studies, although only about one-fifth to one-third of the potency of dextroamphetamine by weight.

== Pharmacology ==
=== Pharmacodynamics ===
Phenmetrazine acts as a norepinephrine–dopamine releasing agent (NDRA), with EC_{50} values for induction of norepinephrine and dopamine release of 29–50 nM and 70–131 nM, respectively. It has very weak activity as a releaser of serotonin, with an EC_{50} value of 7,765 to >10,000 nM. The drug is several times less potent than dextroamphetamine and dextromethamphetamine as an NDRA in vitro. This is in accordance with the higher doses required clinically.

Monoamine release of phenmetrazine and related agents (EC_{50}, nM)
Compound	NE	DA	5-HT	Ref
Phenethylamine	10.9	39.5	>10,000	
Dextroamphetamine	6.6–10.2	5.8–24.8	698–1,765	
Dextromethamphetamine	12.3–14.3	8.5–40.4	736–1,292	
2-Phenylmorpholine	79	86	20,260	
Phenmetrazine	29–50.4	70–131	7,765–>10,000	
(+)-Phenmetrazine	37.5	87.4	3246	
(–)-Phenmetrazine	62.9	415	>10,000	
Phendimetrazine	>10,000	>10,000	>100,000	
Pseudophenmetrazine	514	>10,000 (RI)	>10,000	
(+)-Pseudophenmetrazine	349	1,457	>10,000	
(–)-Pseudophenmetrazine	2,511	IA (RI)	>10,000	
Notes: The smaller the value, the more strongly the drug releases the neurotransmitter. The assays were done in rat brain synaptosomes and human potencies may be different. See also Monoamine releasing agent § Activity profiles for a larger table with more compounds. Refs:

In contrast to many other monoamine releasing agents (MRAs), phenmetrazine is inactive in terms of vesicular monoamine transporter 2 (VMAT2) actions. A few other MRAs have also been found to be inactive at VMAT2, such as phentermine and benzylpiperazine (BZP). These findings indicate that VMAT2 activity is non-essential for robust MRA actions.

Phenmetrazine does not appear to have been assessed at the trace amine-associated receptor 1 (TAAR1).

Phenmetrazine has been found to dose-dependently elevate brain dopamine levels in rodents in vivo. A 10 mg/kg i.v. dose of phenmetrazine increased nucleus accumbens dopamine levels by around 1,400% in rats. For comparison, dextroamphetamine 3 mg/kg i.p. increased striatal dopamine levels by about 5,000% in rats. On the other hand, the maximal increases in brain dopamine levels with phenmetrazine are similar to those with the proposed dopamine transporter (DAT) "inverse agonists" methylphenidate and cocaine (e.g., ~1,500%). Dopamine-releasing drugs that lack VMAT2 activity are theorized to produce much smaller maximal impacts on dopamine levels under experimental conditions than those which also act on VMAT2 like amphetamine. However, the pharmacological significance of these VMAT2 interactions in humans is unclear.

In trials performed on rats, it has been found that after subcutaneous administration of phenmetrazine, both optical isomers are equally effective in reducing food intake, but in oral administration the levo isomer is more effective. In terms of central stimulation however, the dextro isomer is about four times as effective in both methods of administration.

=== Pharmacokinetics ===
After an oral dose, about 70% of the drug is excreted from the body within 24 hours. About 19% of that is excreted as the unmetabolised drug and the rest as various metabolites.

The salt which has been used for immediate-release formulations is phenmetrazine hydrochloride (Preludin). Sustained-release formulations were available as resin-bound, rather than soluble, salts. Both of these dosage forms share a similar bioavailability as well as time to peak onset, however, sustained-release formulations offer improved pharmacokinetics with a steady release of active ingredient which results in a lower peak concentration in blood plasma.

== Chemistry ==
Phenmetrazine, also known as (2RS,3RS)-2-phenyl-3-methylmorpholine or as (2RS,3RS)-3-methyl-2-phenyltetrahydro-2H-1,4-oxazine, is a substituted phenylmorpholine. It is the (2RS,3RS)- or (±)-trans- enantiomer of 2-phenyl-3-methylmorpholine.

Phenmetrazine's chemical structure incorporates the backbone of amphetamine, the prototypical psychostimulant which, like phenmetrazine, is a releasing agent of dopamine and norepinephrine. The molecule also loosely resembles ethcathinone, the active metabolite of popular anorectic amfepramone (diethylpropion). Unlike phenmetrazine, ethcathinone (and therefore amfepramone as well) are mostly selective as norepinephrine releasing agents.

A variety of phenmetrazine analogues and derivatives have been encountered as designer drugs. In addition, the activities of various phenmetrazine analogues and derivatives as monoamine releasing agent (MRA) have been described.

=== Synthesis ===
Phenmetrazine can be synthesized in three steps from 2-bromopropiophenone and ethanolamine. The intermediate alcohol 3-methyl-2-phenylmorpholin-2-ol (1) is converted to a fumarate salt (2) with fumaric acid, then reduced with sodium borohydride to give phenmetrazine free base (3). The free base can be converted to the fumarate salt (4) by reaction with fumaric acid.

== History ==
Phenmetrazine was first patented in Germany in 1952 by Boehringer-Ingelheim, with some pharmacological data published in 1954. It was the result of a search by Thomä and Wick for an anorectic drug without the side effects of amphetamine. Phenmetrazine was introduced into clinical use in 1954 in Europe.

== Society and culture ==
=== Names ===
Phenmetrazine is the generic name of the drug and its INN, USAN, and BAN. It is also known by the brand name Preludin.

=== Availability ===
In 2004, phenmetrazine remained marketed only in Israel.

=== Legal status ===
Phenmetrazine is a Schedule II controlled substance in the United States.

=== Recreational use ===
Phenmetrazine has been used recreationally in many countries, including Sweden. When stimulant use first became prevalent in Sweden in the 1950s, phenmetrazine was preferred to amphetamine and methamphetamine by users. In the autobiographical novel Rush by Kim Wozencraft, intravenous phenmetrazine is described as the most euphoric and pro-sexual of the stimulants the author used.

Phenmetrazine was classified as a narcotic in Sweden in 1959, and was taken completely off the market in 1965. Formerly the illegal demand was satisfied by smuggling from Germany, and later Spain and Italy. At first, Preludin tablets were smuggled, but soon the smugglers started bringing in raw phenmetrazine powder. Eventually amphetamine became the dominant stimulant of abuse because of its greater availability.

Phenmetrazine was taken by the Beatles early in their career. Paul McCartney was one known user. McCartney's introduction to drugs started in Hamburg, Germany. The Beatles had to play for hours, and they were often given the drug (referred to as "prellies") by the maid who cleaned their housing arrangements, German customers, or by Astrid Kirchherr (whose mother bought them). McCartney would usually take one, but John Lennon would often take four or five. Hunter Davies asserted, in his 1968 biography of the band, that their use of such stimulants then was in response to their need to stay awake and keep working, rather than a simple desire for kicks.

Jack Ruby said he was on phenmetrazine at the time he killed Lee Harvey Oswald.

Preludin was also used recreationally in the US throughout the 1960s and 1970s. It could be crushed up in water, heated and injected. The street name for the drug in Washington, DC was "Bam". Phenmetrazine continues to be used and abused around the world, in countries including South Korea.
