= Aminorex =

Chemical compound

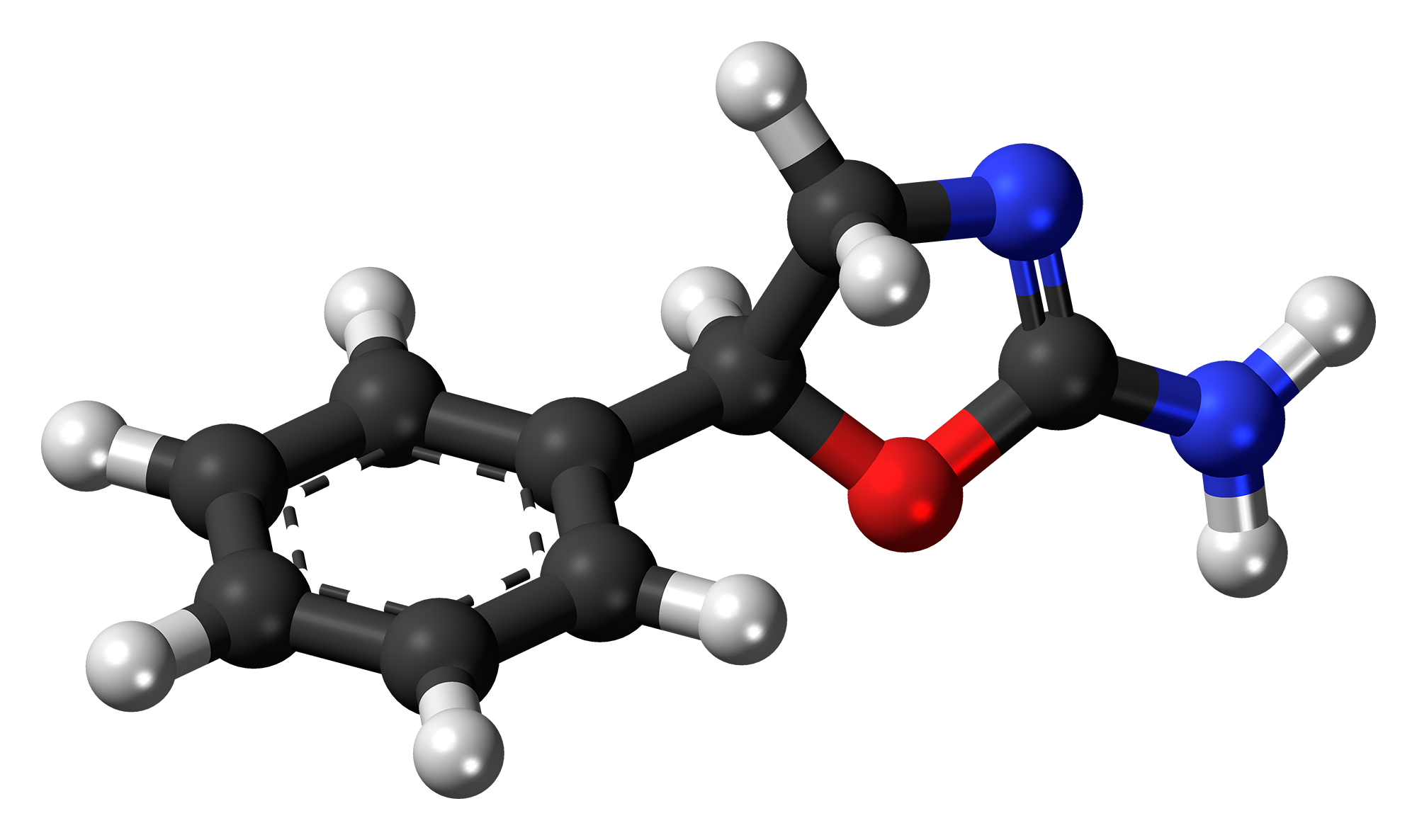

Clinical data
- Other names: Aminoxaphen; Aminoxafen; McN-742
- Routes of administration: Oral
- Drug class: Stimulant; Appetite suppressant; Norepinephrine–dopamine releasing agent
- ATC code: None

Legal status
- Legal status: BR: Class B2 (Anorectic drugs); CA: Schedule III; DE: Anlage II (Authorized trade only, not prescriptible); UK: Class C; US: Schedule I

Identifiers
- IUPAC name: (RS)-5-phenyl-4,5-dihydro-1,3-oxazol-2-amine
- CAS Number: 2207-50-3
- PubChem CID: 16630
- DrugBank: DB01490
- ChemSpider: 15767
- UNII: 2SH16612I9
- KEGG: D02909
- ChEMBL: ChEMBL106258
- CompTox Dashboard (EPA): DTXSID00862867
- ECHA InfoCard: 100.164.420

Chemical and physical data
- Formula: C_{9}H_{10}N_{2}O
- Molar mass: 162.192 g·mol^{−1}
- 3D model (JSmol): Interactive image
- Chirality: Racemic mixture
- SMILES: NC1=NCC(C2=CC=CC=C2)O1
- InChI: InChI=1S/C9H10N2O/c10-9-11-6-8(12-9)7-4-2-1-3-5-7/h1-5,8H,6H2,(H2,10,11); Key:SYAKTDIEAPMBAL-UHFFFAOYSA-N

Aminorex, sold under the brand names Menocil and Apoquel among others, is a weight loss (anorectic) stimulant drug. It was withdrawn from the market after it was found to cause pulmonary hypertension (PPH). In the United States, aminorex is a Schedule I controlled substance.

Aminorex, in the 2-amino-5-aryloxazoline group, was developed by McNeil Laboratories in 1962. It is closely related to 4-methylaminorex (4-MAR). Aminorex has been shown to have locomotor-stimulant effects, lying midway between dextroamphetamine and methamphetamine. Aminorex effects have been attributed to the release of catecholamines. It can be produced as a metabolite of the deworming medication levamisole, which is very frequently used as a cutting agent of illicitly produced cocaine.

== Medical uses ==
Aminorex was formerly used as an appetite suppressant.

== Pharmacology ==
=== Pharmacodynamics ===
Aminorex is a serotonin–norepinephrine–dopamine releasing agent (SNDRA). Its EC_{50} values for induction of monoamine release are 26.4 nM for norepinephrine, 49.4 nM for dopamine, and 193 nM for serotonin. In addition to its monoamine-releasing activity, aminorex is a weak agonist of the serotonin 5-HT_{2} receptors, including of the serotonin 5-HT_{2A}, 5-HT_{2B}, and 5-HT_{2C} receptors. Its EC_{50} values for activation of these receptors are 4,365 nM for 5-HT_{2A}, 870 nM for 5-HT_{2B}, and 525 nM for 5-HT_{2C}.

Monoamine release of aminorex and related agents (EC_{50}, nM)
Compound	NE	DA	5-HT	Ref
Phenethylamine	10.9	39.5	>10,000	
Dextroamphetamine	6.6–10.2	5.8–24.8	698–1,765	
Dextromethamphetamine	12.3–14.3	8.5–40.4	736–1,292	
Aminorex	15.1–26.4	9.1–49.4	193–414	
cis-4-MAR	4.8	1.7	53.2	
cis-4,4'-DMAR	11.8–31.6	8.6–24.4	17.7–59.9	
trans-4,4'-DMAR	31.6	24.4	59.9	
cis-MDMAR	14.8	10.2	43.9	
trans-MDMAR	38.9	36.2	73.4	
Notes: The smaller the value, the more strongly the drug releases the neurotransmitter. The assays were done in rat brain synaptosomes and human potencies may be different. See also Monoamine releasing agent § Activity profiles for a larger table with more compounds. Refs:

Activation of serotonin 5-HT_{2B} receptors by aminorex, either directly via agonism or indirectly via serotonin release, has been implicated in the development of pulmonary arterial hypertension and cardiac valvulopathy with the drug. However, its EC_{50} for serotonin 5-HT_{2B} receptor activation is 33-fold higher than its EC_{50} value for induction of norepinephrine release and is almost 50-fold less potent than the serotonin 5-HT_{2B} receptor agonism of dexnorfenfluramine. This seems to call into question the role of direct agonism of the serotonin 5-HT_{2B} receptor in the toxicity of aminorex. Along similar lines, chlorphentermine, a related drug that has also been associated with such adverse effects, shows negligible direct serotonin 5-HT_{2B} receptor agonistic activity. However, it is possible that metabolites of aminorex and chlorphentermine might be more potent in this action.

Aminorex does not appear to have been assessed at the trace amine-associated receptor 1 (TAAR1). However, several derivatives of aminorex, such as 4-methylaminorex (4-MAR) and 4,4'-dimethylaminorex (4,4'-DMAR), have been found to be inactive at the mouse and rat TAAR1. Many other monoamine releasing agents (MRAs), such as many amphetamines, are rodent and/or human TAAR1 agonists. Activation of the TAAR1 may auto-inhibit and thereby constrain the monoaminergic effects of these agents. Lack of TAAR1 agonism in the case of aminorex analogues might enhance their effects relative to MRAs possessing TAAR1 agonism.

== Chemistry ==
Aminorex is a member of the 2-amino-5-phenyloxazoline group. It is structurally related to the substituted amphetamines like amphetamine and to the substituted phenylmorpholines like phenmetrazine.

A variety of derivatives and analogues of aminorex are known. These include 2'-fluoro-4-methylaminorex (2F-MAR), 2C-B-aminorex, 3',4'-methylenedioxy-4-methylaminorex (MDMAR), 4'-bromo-4-methylaminorex (4B-MAR), 4'-chloro-4-methylaminorex (4C-MAR), 4'-fluoro-4-methylaminorex (4F-MAR), 4-methylaminorex (4-MAR), 4,4'-dimethylaminorex (4,4'-DMAR), clominorex, cyclazodone, fenozolone, fluminorex, pemoline, and thozalinone, among others.

The use of Phenyl(piperidin-2-yl)methanol (a chemical used in the manufacture of Levophacetoperane) as precursor gives an agent that is called WV-1501 [5712-28-7]

=== Synthesis ===
The synthesis was first reported in a structure-activity relationship study of 2-amino-5-aryl-2-oxazolines, where aminorex was found to be approximately 2.5 times more potent than D-amphetamine sulfate in inducing anorexia in rats, and was also reported to have CNS stimulant effects.

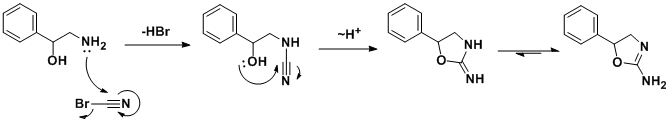

The racemic synthesis involves addition/cyclization reaction of 2-amino-1-phenylethanol with cyanogen bromide. A similar synthesis has been also published. In a search for a cheaper synthetic route, a German team developed an alternative route which, by using chiral styrene oxide, allows an enantiopure product.

== History ==
It was discovered in 1962 by Edward John Hurlburt, and was quickly found in 1963 to have an anorectic effect in rats. It was introduced as a prescription appetite suppressant in Germany, Switzerland and Austria in 1965, but was withdrawn in 1972 after it was found to cause pulmonary hypertension in approximately 0.2% of patients, and was linked to a number of deaths.
