= List of aminorex analogues =

This is a list of aminorex analogues, also known as substituted 2-amino-5-aryloxazolines. Aminorex itself is a stimulant drug with a 5-phenyl-2-amino-oxazoline structure. It was developed in the 1960s as an anorectic, but withdrawn from sale after it was discovered that extended use produced pulmonary hypertension, often followed by heart failure, which resulted in a number of deaths. A designer drug analogue 4-methylaminorex appeared on the illicit market in the late 1980s but did not attract significant popularity due to its steep dose-response curve and tendency to produce seizures. Pemoline, the 4-keto derivative of aminorex, had been discovered several years earlier, and derivatives of this type appeared to be effective stimulants with comparatively low toxicity. Pemoline was sold for around 25 years as a therapy for ADHD and relief of fatigue, before being withdrawn from the market in 2005 because of rare but serious cases of liver failure. More recently in around 2014 another derivative 4,4'-dimethylaminorex started to be sold illicitly, but again swiftly lost popularity due to a spate of fatal overdose cases. A number of related compounds are known, and new derivatives have continued to appear on the designer drug market.

== List of substituted aminorex derivatives ==
Structure	Common name	Chemical name	CAS #
	5-Phenyl-2-oxazoline	5-phenyl-4,5-dihydro-1,3-oxazole	?
	Aminorex	5-phenyl-4,5-dihydro-1,3-oxazol-2-amine	2207-50-3
	Rexamino	4-phenyl-4,5-dihydro-1,3-oxazol-2-amine	52883-35-9
	4'-Fluoroaminorex (4'-FAR)	5-(4-fluorophenyl)-4,5-dihydro-1,3-oxazol-2-amine	2967-77-3
	Clominorex	5-(4-chlorophenyl)-4,5-dihydro-1,3-oxazol-2-amine	3876-10-6
	Fluminorex	5-[4-(trifluoromethyl)phenyl]-4,5-dihydro-1,3-oxazol-2-amine	720-76-3
	Methylenedioxyaminorex	5-(3,4-methylenedioxyphenyl)-4,5-dihydro-1,3-oxazol-2-amine	3865-98-3
	2C-B-aminorex (2C-B-AR)	5-(2,5-dimethoxy-4-bromophenyl)-4,5-dihydro-1,3-oxazol-2-amine	
	N,N-Dimethylaminorex (N,N-DMAR)	N,N-dimethyl-5-phenyl-4,5-dihydro-1,3-oxazol-2-amine	32968-41-5
	Pemoline	2-amino-5-phenyl-1,3-oxazol-4(5H)-one	2152-34-3
	Thozalinone	2-(dimethylamino)-5-phenyl-1,3-oxazol-4(5H)-one	655-05-0
	3F-Thozalinone	2-(dimethylamino)-5-(3-fluorophenyl)-1,3-oxazol-4(5H)-one	
	Fenozolone	2-ethylamino-5-phenyl-1,3-oxazol-4-one	15302-16-6
	Cyclazodone	2-(cyclopropylamino)-5-phenyl-1,3-oxazol-4-one	14461-91-7
	N-Methylcyclazodone	2-(cyclopropyl(methyl)amino)-5-phenyl-1,3-oxazol-4-one	14461-92-8
	Ephedroxane	(4S,5R)-3,4-dimethyl-5-phenyl-1,3-oxazolidin-2-one	16251-46-0
	3-Methylaminorex	3-methyl-5-phenyl-2-oxazolidinimine	75343-73-6
	4-Methylaminorex (4-MAR)	4-methyl-5-phenyl-4,5-dihydro-1,3-oxazol-2-amine	3568-94-3
	4-Ethylaminorex (4-EAR)	4-ethyl-5-phenyl-4,5-dihydro-1,3-oxazol-2-amine	1364933-63-0
	4-Isopropylaminorex	4-isopropyl-5-phenyl-4,5-dihydro-1,3-oxazol-2-amine	
	4-Isobutylaminorex	4-(2-methylpropyl)-5-phenyl-4,5-dihydro-1,3-oxazol-2-amine	
	4-tert-butylaminorex	4-(1,1-dimethylethyl)-5-phenyl-4,5-dihydro-1,3-oxazol-2-amine	
	4,N-Dimethylaminorex (4,N-DMAR)	4,5-dihydro-N,4-dimethyl-5-phenyl-2-oxazolamine	2207-49-0
	3,4-Dimethylaminorex (3,4-DMAR)	3,4-dimethyl-5-phenyl-2-oxazolidinimine	82485-31-2
	4,4'-Dimethylaminorex (4,4'-DMAR)	4-methyl-5-(4-methylphenyl)-4,5-dihydro-1,3-oxazol-2-amine	1445569-01-6
	2'-Fluoro-4-methylaminorex (2F-MAR)	4-methyl-5-(2-fluorophenyl)-4,5-dihydro-1,3-oxazol-2-amine	
	3'-Fluoro-4-methylaminorex (3F-MAR)	4-methyl-5-(3-fluorophenyl)-4,5-dihydro-1,3-oxazol-2-amine	
	4'-Fluoro-4-methylaminorex (4F-MAR)	4-methyl-5-(4-fluorophenyl)-4,5-dihydro-1,3-oxazol-2-amine	1364933-64-1
	4'-Chloro-4-methylaminorex (4C-MAR)	4-methyl-5-(4-chlorophenyl)-4,5-dihydro-1,3-oxazol-2-amine	
	4'-Bromo-4-methylaminorex (4B-MAR)	4-methyl-5-(4-bromophenyl)-4,5-dihydro-1,3-oxazol-2-amine	
	4'-Methoxy-4-methylaminorex (4'-MeO-4-MAR)	4-methyl-5-(4-methoxyphenyl)-4,5-dihydro-1,3-oxazol-2-amine	1445570-65-9
	3',4',5'-Trimethoxy-4-methylaminorex (TM-4-MAR)	4-methyl-5-(3,4,5-trimethoxyphenyl)-4,5-dihydro-1,3-oxazol-2-amine	1445571-92-5
	3',4'-Methylenedioxy-4-methylaminorex (MDMAR)	4-methyl-5-(3,4-methylenedioyphenyl)-4,5-dihydro-1,3-oxazol-2-amine	1445573-16-9

== See also ==
- Berefrine
- RO5166017
- List of methylphenidate analogues
- Substituted benzofuran
- Substituted cathinone
- Substituted phenylmorpholine
