= 3F-Thozalinone =

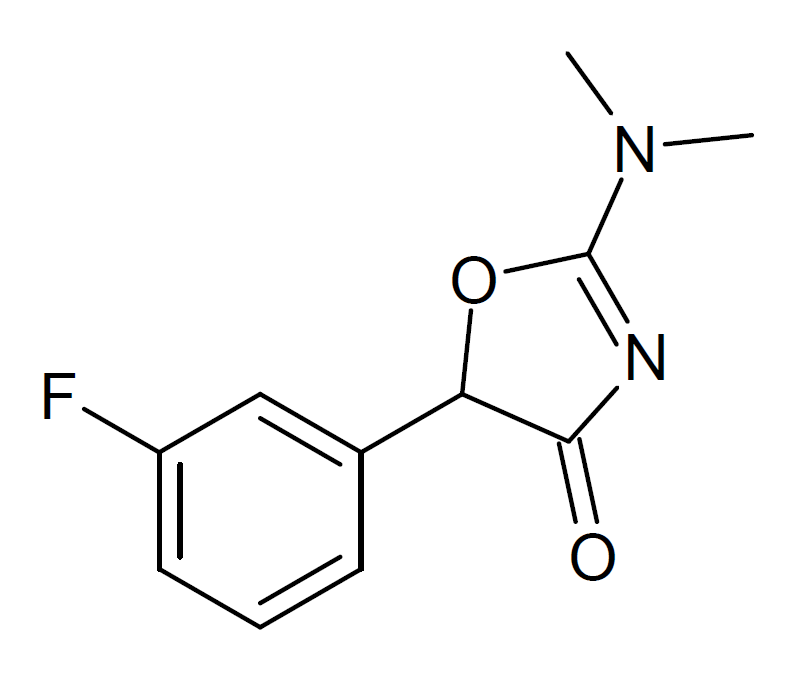

Identifiers
- IUPAC name: (RS)-2-dimethylamino-5-(3-fluorophenyl)-1,3-oxazol-4-one

Chemical and physical data
- Formula: C_{11}H_{11}FN_{2}O_{2}
- Molar mass: 222.219 g·mol^{−1}
- 3D model (JSmol): Interactive image
- Chirality: Racemic mixture
- SMILES: CN(C)C=1OC(c2cc(F)ccc2)C(=O)N=1

3F-Thozalinone (Frotozalinone) is a designer drug with stimulant effects, first reported in January 2026. It is the 3-fluoro derivative of thozalinone, and is related to drugs such as pemoline and 4'-Fluoro-4-methylaminorex.

== See also ==
- 2F-MAR
- 3-Fluoroamphetamine
- 3-Fluoromethcathinone
- 3-Fluorophenmetrazine
- 4-Methylaminorex
- Fluminorex
