= 4B-MAR =

Chemical compound

4'-Bromo-4-methylaminorex
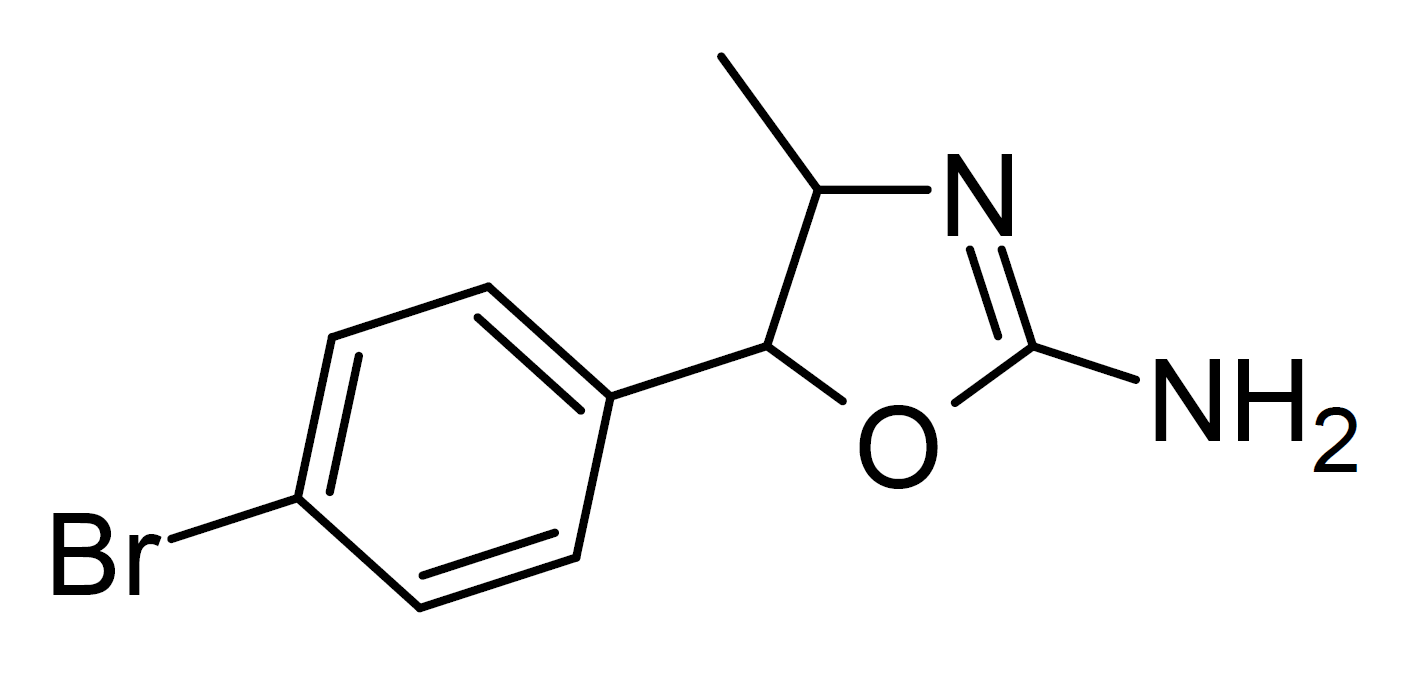

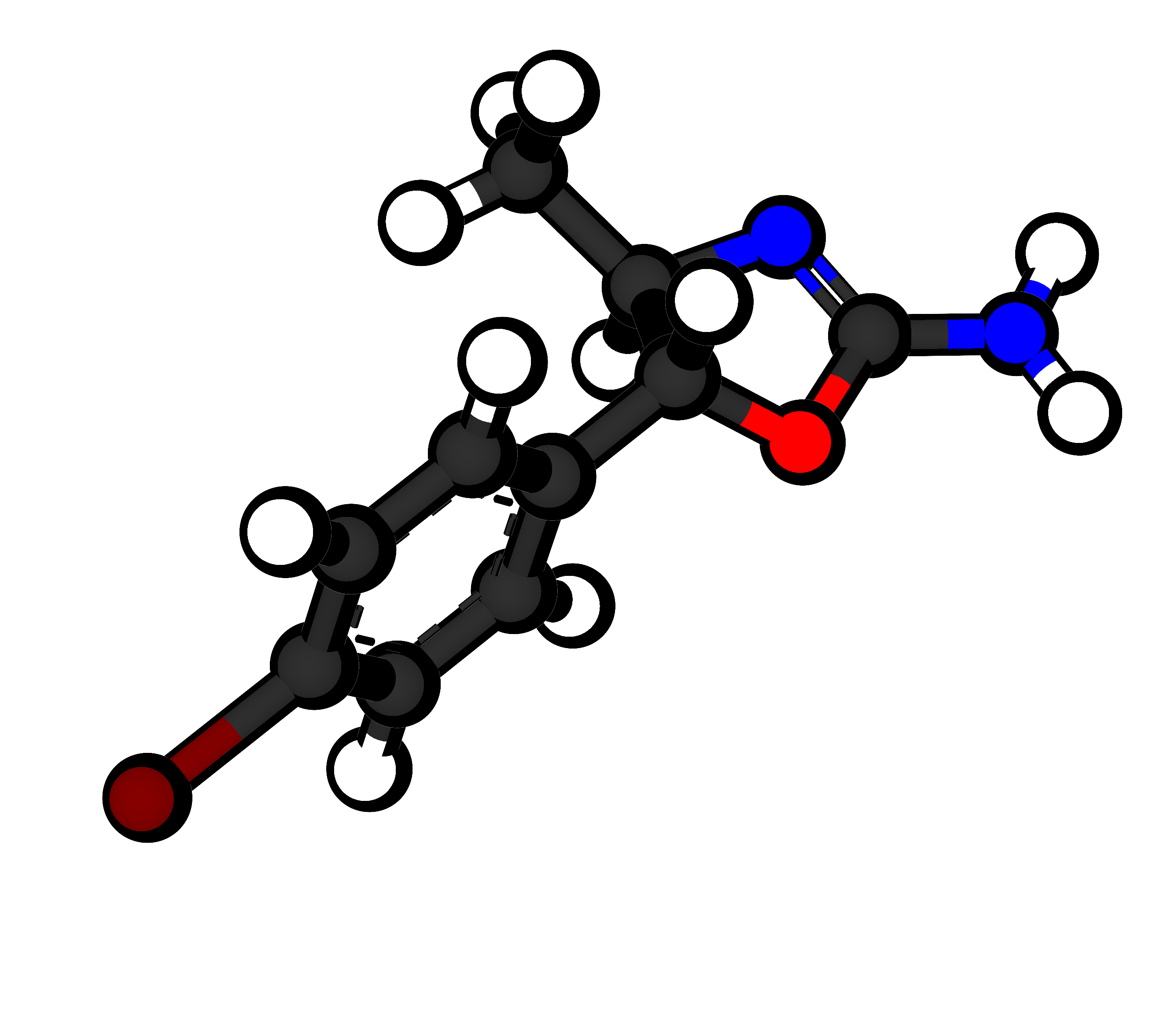

Identifiers
- IUPAC name: 4-methyl-5-(4-bromophenyl)-4,5-dihydro-1,3-oxazol-2-amine
- CAS Number: 3063572-03-9
- PubChem CID: 165361748
- ChemSpider: 129395373

Chemical and physical data
- Formula: C_{10}H_{11}BrN_{2}O
- Molar mass: 255.115 g·mol^{−1}
- 3D model (JSmol): Interactive image
- SMILES: CC1C(OC(=N1)N)C2=CC=C(C=C2)Br
- InChI: InChI=1S/C10H11BrN2O/c1-6-9(14-10(12)13-6)7-2-4-8(11)5-3-7/h2-6,9H,1H3,(H2,12,13); Key:TUHDNALAVIDYHT-UHFFFAOYSA-N

4'-Bromo-4-methylaminorex (4B-MAR, 4'-Br-4-MAR) is a designer drug from the substituted aminorex family, first definitively identified in Austria in January 2022. Its pharmacological activity has not been reported, but it is believed to have stimulant effects.

== See also ==
- 2C-B-aminorex
- 2F-MAR
- 4C-MAR
- 4,4'-DMAR
- 4'-Fluoro-4-methylaminorex
- 4-Methylaminorex
- MDMAR
- 3-Bromomethylphenidate
- 4-Bromoamphetamine
- 4-Bromomethcathinone
- RTI-51
