= C11H12N2O2 =

The molecular formula C_{11}H_{12}N_{2}O_{2} (molar mass : 204.22 g/mol, exact mass : 204.089878) may refer to:

- Ethotoin
- Fenozolone
- Idazoxan
- Nirvanol
- ORG-26576
- 3-Phenylazoacetylacetone
- Thozalinone
- Tryptophan
