= C10H11FN2O =

The molecular formula C_{10}H_{11}FN_{2}O (molar mass: 194.21 g/mol) may refer to:

- 2F-MAR
- 4'-Fluoro-4-methylaminorex
- Nifene
- RO 5263397
