= Erlenmeyer =

The word Erlenmeyer may mean:

- Richard August Carl Emil Erlenmeyer (1825–1909), German chemist
- Erlenmeyer flask, conical glassware invented by Richard Erlenmeyer
- The bony deformity named Deformity type Erlenmeyer flask because of the similarity to the shape of the flask
- Friedrich Gustav Carl Emil Erlenmeyer (1864–1921), son of R. A. C. E. Erlenmeyer
- Erlenmeyer Rule proposed by R. A. C. E. Erlenmeyer
- "The Erlenmeyer Flask", an episode of the television series The X-Files
