= Clominorex =

Chemical compound

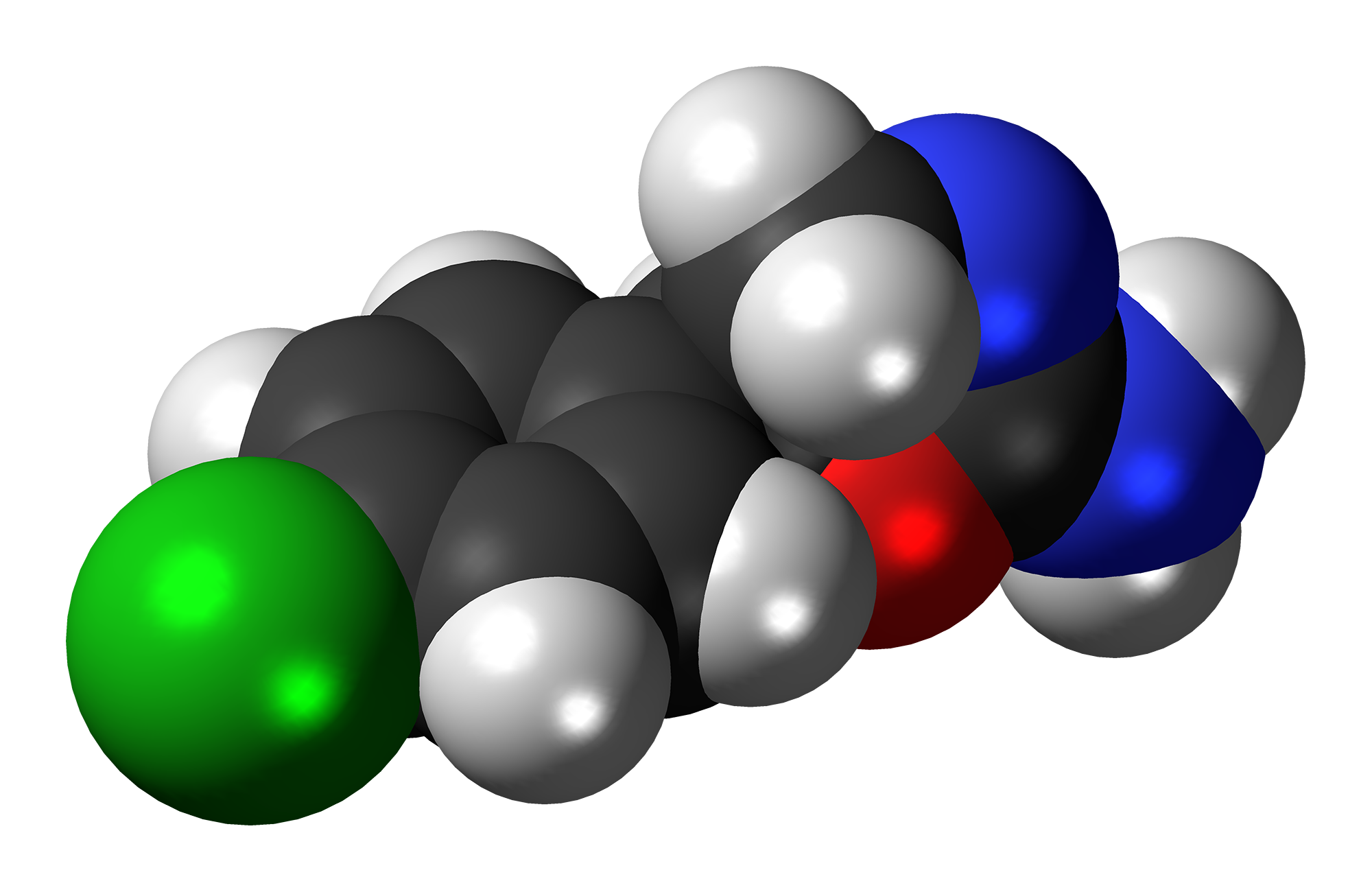

Clinical data
- ATC code: none

Identifiers
- IUPAC name: (RS)-5-(4-chlorophenyl)-4,5-dihydro-1,3-oxazol-2-amine
- CAS Number: 3876-10-6
- PubChem CID: 19752
- ChemSpider: 18605
- UNII: O1R2462WA0
- KEGG: D03552
- ChEMBL: ChEMBL2104179
- CompTox Dashboard (EPA): DTXSID30863286

Chemical and physical data
- Formula: C_{9}H_{9}ClN_{2}O
- Molar mass: 196.63 g·mol^{−1}
- 3D model (JSmol): Interactive image
- Chirality: Racemic mixture
- SMILES: Clc1ccc(cc1)C2O\C(=N/C2)N
- InChI: InChI=1S/C9H9ClN2O/c10-7-3-1-6(2-4-7)8-5-12-9(11)13-8/h1-4,8H,5H2,(H2,11,12); Key:HAHOPPGVHWVBRR-UHFFFAOYSA-N

Clominorex is a centrally acting sympathomimetic which is related to other drugs such as aminorex and pemoline. It was developed as an appetite suppressant by McNeil Laboratories in the 1950s.

== See also ==
- 4C-MAR
- 4-Methylaminorex
- Aminorex
- Cyclazodone
- Fenozolone
- Fluminorex
- Pemoline
- Thozalinone
