= Oxazolone =

Chemical structure of the 5-(4H)-oxazolone isomer

Oxazolone is a chemical compound and functional group, with the molecular formula C_{3}H_{3}NO_{2}. It was named in-line with the Hantzsch–Widman nomenclature and is part of a large family of oxazole based compounds. There are a total of 5 structural isomers of oxazolone; 3 according to the location of the carbonyl group and 2 more according to the location of the double bond C=X (with X= N or C):

- 2-(3H)oxazolone
- 2-(5H)oxazolone
- 4-(5H)-oxazolone
- 5-(2H)-oxazolone
- 5-(4H)-oxazolone

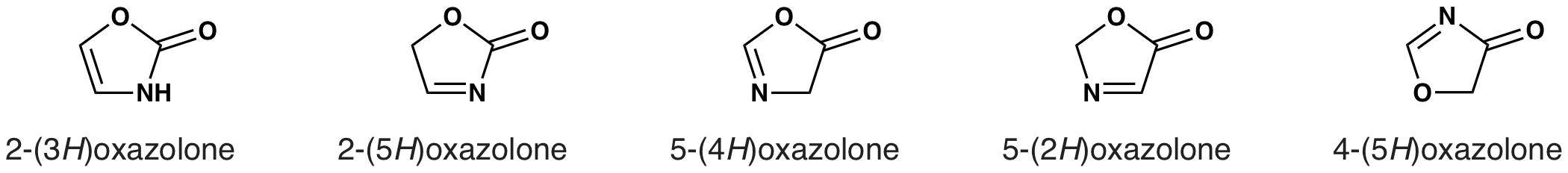

The 4-oxazolone motif, which is also formally a lactam, is present in a number of drugs (fenozolone, thozalinone, cyclazodone, reclazepam etc.).

Substituted 5-oxazolones may also be regarded as the cyclization products of N-acyl α-amino acids, making them lactones, and are sometimes referred to as azlactones.

== See also ==
- Münchnone
- Oxazole
- Oxazolidone — the saturated analogues
