= Fluminorex =

Chemical compound

Clinical data
- ATC code: none

Identifiers
- IUPAC name: (RS)-5-[4-(trifluoromethyl)phenyl]-4,5-dihydro-1,3-oxazol-2-amine
- CAS Number: 720-76-3
- PubChem CID: 24100
- ChemSpider: 22530
- UNII: LUO2Z7954T
- KEGG: D04210
- ChEMBL: ChEMBL2107247
- CompTox Dashboard (EPA): DTXSID00862387

Chemical and physical data
- Formula: C_{10}H_{9}F_{3}N_{2}O
- Molar mass: 230.190 g·mol^{−1}
- 3D model (JSmol): Interactive image
- Chirality: Racemic mixture
- SMILES: FC(F)(F)c1ccc(cc1)C2O\C(=N/C2)N
- InChI: InChI=1S/C10H9F3N2O/c11-10(12,13)7-3-1-6(2-4-7)8-5-15-9(14)16-8/h1-4,8H,5H2,(H2,14,15); Key:NMGYDYBWRZHLHR-UHFFFAOYSA-N

Fluminorex is a centrally acting sympathomimetic which is related to other drugs such as aminorex and pemoline. It was developed as an appetite suppressant by McNeil Laboratories in the 1950s.

== Synthesis ==
Synthesis: Patent (Ex XV):

2-amino-1-[4-(trifluoromethyl)phenyl]ethanol [776-02-3] (1) cyanogen bromide [506-68-3] (2)

== See also ==
- 4'-Fluoro-4-methylaminorex
- 4-Methylaminorex
- Aminorex
- Clominorex
- Cyclazodone
- Fenozolone
- Pemoline
- Thozalinone
