= Erlenmeyer–Plöchl azlactone and amino-acid synthesis =

Series of chemical reactions

The Erlenmeyer–Plöchl azlactone and amino acid synthesis, named after Friedrich Gustav Carl Emil Erlenmeyer who partly discovered the reaction, is a series of chemical reactions which transform an N-acyl glycine to various other amino acids via an oxazolone (also known as an azlactone).

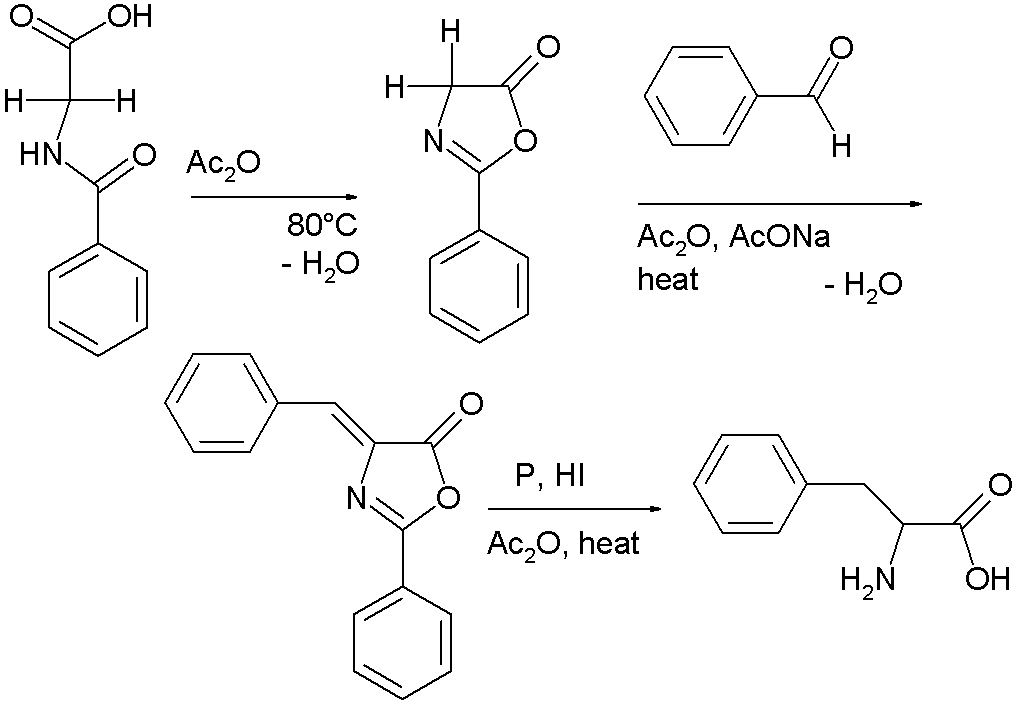
Azlactone chemistry: step 2 is a Perkin variation

Hippuric acid, the benzamide derivative of glycine, cyclizes in the presence of acetic anhydride, condensing to give 2-phenyl-oxazolone. This intermediate also has two acidic protons and reacts with benzaldehyde, acetic anhydride and sodium acetate to a so-called azlactone. This compound on reduction gives access to phenylalanine.

== Variations ==
Variants of the azlactone synthesis in which analogues of azlactones are used are sometimes advantageous. Hydantoin (in Bergmann modification), thiohydantoin and rhodanine have each been employed as the enolate-forming component of the condensation. 2,5-Diketopiperazine can be used as a methylene component as well; its condensation products with aromatic aldehydes, on reduction and hydrolysis give the corresponding amino acids.

== Scope ==
In one study the Erlenmeyer amino acid synthesis was used in the heart of an L-m-tyrosine synthesis

== See also ==
- Dakin–West reaction
- Perkin reaction
