= Hans Erlenmeyer =

Swiss chemist and antiquity collector

Hans Friedrich Albrecht Erlenmeyer (March 20, 1900, in Strasbourg – May 29, 1967, in Basel) was a German-Swiss chemist and collector of antiquities. He was a professor of inorganic chemistry at the University of Basel.

== Life and career ==
Hans Erlenmeyer came from a family of chemists; his grandfather Emil Erlenmeyer and his father Emil Erlenmeyer Jr. were both chemistry professors. Erlenmeyer studied chemistry from 1918 to 1922 at the Friedrich Schiller University of Jena and the Humboldt University of Berlin, where he received his doctorate in 1922 with a thesis entitled "On Asymmetric Synthesis". He worked as an assistant to Bernhard Lepsius. In 1925, he became an assistant to Friedrich Fichter in Basel, and in 1927 he habilitated in inorganic chemistry. He became an associate professor in 1933, and in 1941 he succeeded Fichter as full professor and head of the Institute of Inorganic Chemistry.

Erlenmeyer was involved in approximately 500 publications on structural chemistry and immunology, particularly fundamental research for chemotherapy of tuberculosis. He also helped develop the concept of isosteres. He obtained Swiss citizenship in 1934. He helped many victims of Nazism at his institute in Basel. In 1943 he nominated Tadeusz Reichstein, who also lectured in Basel to the Nobel Prize in Chemistry, but at the time Reichstein was not elected. But in 1950, Reichstein then was awarded the Nobel Prize in Physiology or Medicine.

Together with his second wife Marie-Louise Erlenmeyer (1912-1997), he collected prehistoric and ancient art from Greece and Mesopotamia. The purchases were made between 1943 and the early 1960s. The Erlenmeyers partially loaned their pieces to the Antikenmuseum Basel and to major international exhibitions and also wrote scientific publications in the field of archaeology. In the late 1950s or early 1960s, they bought large parts of the so-called Keros Hoard from an art dealer of Greek descent. The hoard included both the largest known Cycladic idol and over 150 fragments of other idols as well as ceramics and other objects. Greece later claimed restitution of the largest idol because, like the entire hoard, it was illegally smuggled out of the country from a looted site. Since this happened before the 1970 UNESCO Convention on the Means of Prohibiting and Preventing the Illicit Import, Export and Transfer of Ownership of Cultural Property, the collectors' actions were considered in good faith.

In 1981, Marie-Louise Erlenmeyer founded the Erlenmeyer Foundation for the benefit of animal and species protection. To support this foundation, the collection was auctioned off in several sales at Christie's and Sotheby's between 1988 and 1998, with the proceeds going towards the foundation. Kurt Aeschbacher is the president of the foundation board as of 2020.

Hans Erlenmeyer acquired the Kushim Tablet in the 1950s.

== Auction catalogs of the Erlenmeyer Collection ==
- Ancient Near Eastern texts from the Erlenmeyer Collection. 13 December 1988. London, Christie's 1988
- The Erlenmeyer collection of Cretan seals. The property of the Erlenmeyer Stiftung which will be sold at Christie's Great Rooms on Monday 5 June 1989. Christie's, London 1989
- The Erlenmeyer collection of Ancient Near Eastern stamp seals and amulets. The property of the Erlenmeyer Stiftung which will be sold at Christie's Great Rooms on Tuesday 6 June 1989. Christie's, London 1989
- Cycladic and classical antiquities from the Erlenmeyer Collection. The property of the Erlenmeyer Stiftung (a foundation for animal welfare). Monday 9th July 1990. Sotheby's, London 1990
- Western Asiatic cylinder seals and antiquities from the Erlenmeyer Collection (Part I). Thursday 9th July 1992. Sotheby's, London 1992
- Antiquities including Western Asiatic cylinder seals and antiquities from the Erlenmeyer Collection (Part II). Thursday, 12 June 1997. Sotheby's, London 1997
- Antiquities and Islamic art. Including antiquities and Western Asiatic seals from the Erlenmeyer Collection, … June 4, 1998. Sotheby's, New York, 1998
