= MDMAR =

Chemical compound

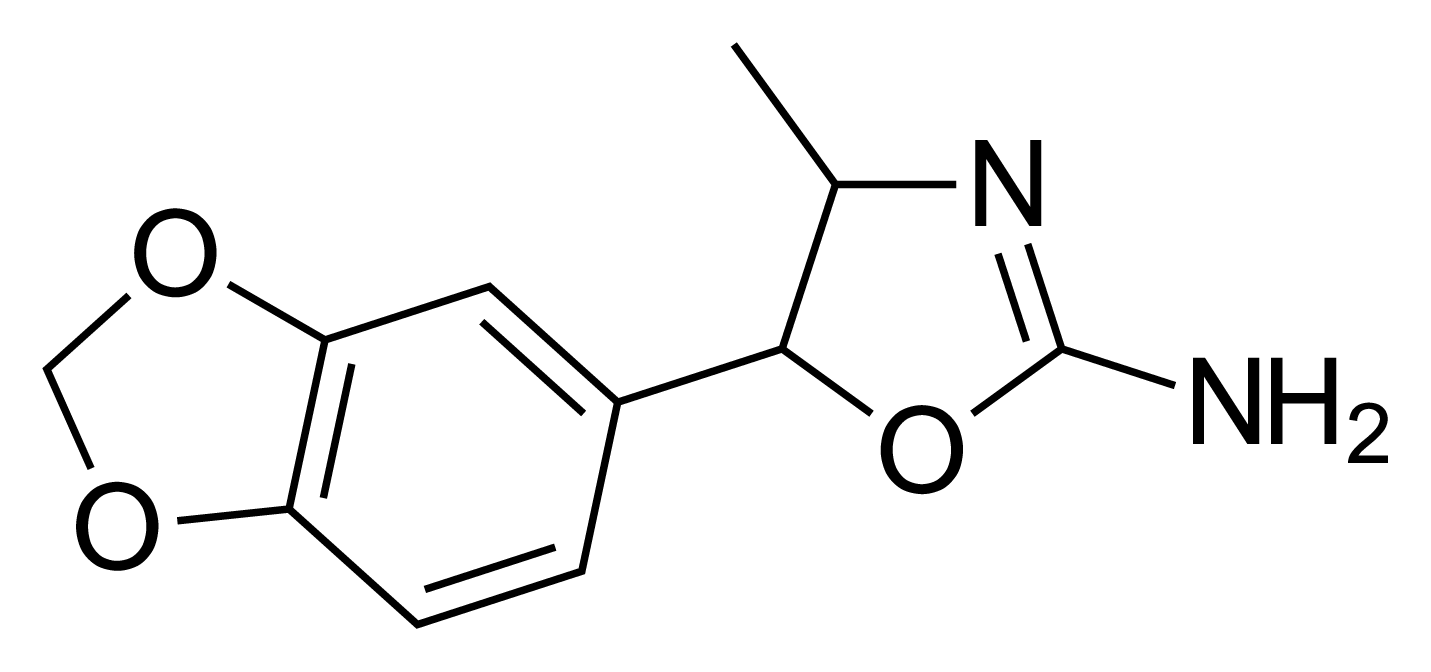

Clinical data
- Other names: 3',4'-Methylenedioxy-4-methylaminorex
- ATC code: None

Identifiers
- IUPAC name: 5-(1,3-benzodioxol-5-yl)-4-methyl-4,5-dihydro-1,3-oxazol-2-amine
- CAS Number: 1445573-16-9
- PubChem CID: 163190697
- ChemSpider: 128918423
- UNII: S2DX832LDF
- CompTox Dashboard (EPA): DTXSID201336901

Chemical and physical data
- Formula: C_{11}H_{12}N_{2}O_{3}
- Molar mass: 220.228 g·mol^{−1}
- 3D model (JSmol): Interactive image
- SMILES: CC1C(OC(=N1)N)C2=CC3=C(C=C2)OCO3
- InChI: InChI=1S/C11H12N2O3/c1-6-10(16-11(12)13-6)7-2-3-8-9(4-7)15-5-14-8/h2-4,6,10H,5H2,1H3,(H2,12,13); Key:JFKNBDXNCLMRPL-UHFFFAOYSA-N

3',4'-Methylenedioxy-4-methylaminorex (MDMAR) is a recreational designer drug from the substituted aminorex family, with monoamine-releasing effects. It is a potent serotonin–norepinephrine–dopamine releasing agent (SNDRA).

Monoamine release of MDMAR and related agents (EC_{50}, nM)
Compound	NE	DA	5-HT	Ref
Phenethylamine	10.9	39.5	>10,000	
Dextroamphetamine	6.6–10.2	5.8–24.8	698–1,765	
Dextromethamphetamine	12.3–14.3	8.5–40.4	736–1,292	
Aminorex	15.1–26.4	9.1–49.4	193–414	
cis-4-MAR	4.8	1.7	53.2	
cis-4,4'-DMAR	11.8–31.6	8.6–24.4	17.7–59.9	
trans-4,4'-DMAR	31.6	24.4	59.9	
cis-MDMAR	14.8	10.2	43.9	
trans-MDMAR	38.9	36.2	73.4	
Notes: The smaller the value, the more strongly the drug releases the neurotransmitter. The assays were done in rat brain synaptosomes and human potencies may be different. See also Monoamine releasing agent § Activity profiles for a larger table with more compounds. Refs:

== See also ==
- Substituted methylenedioxyphenethylamine
- 2C-B-aminorex
- 4B-MAR
- 4C-MAR
- 4,4'-DMAR
- 4'-Fluoro-4-methylaminorex
- 5-MAPB
- MDMA
- Methylenedioxyphenmetrazine
- List of aminorex analogues
