= 4C-MAR =

Chemical compound

4'-Chloro-4-methylaminorex
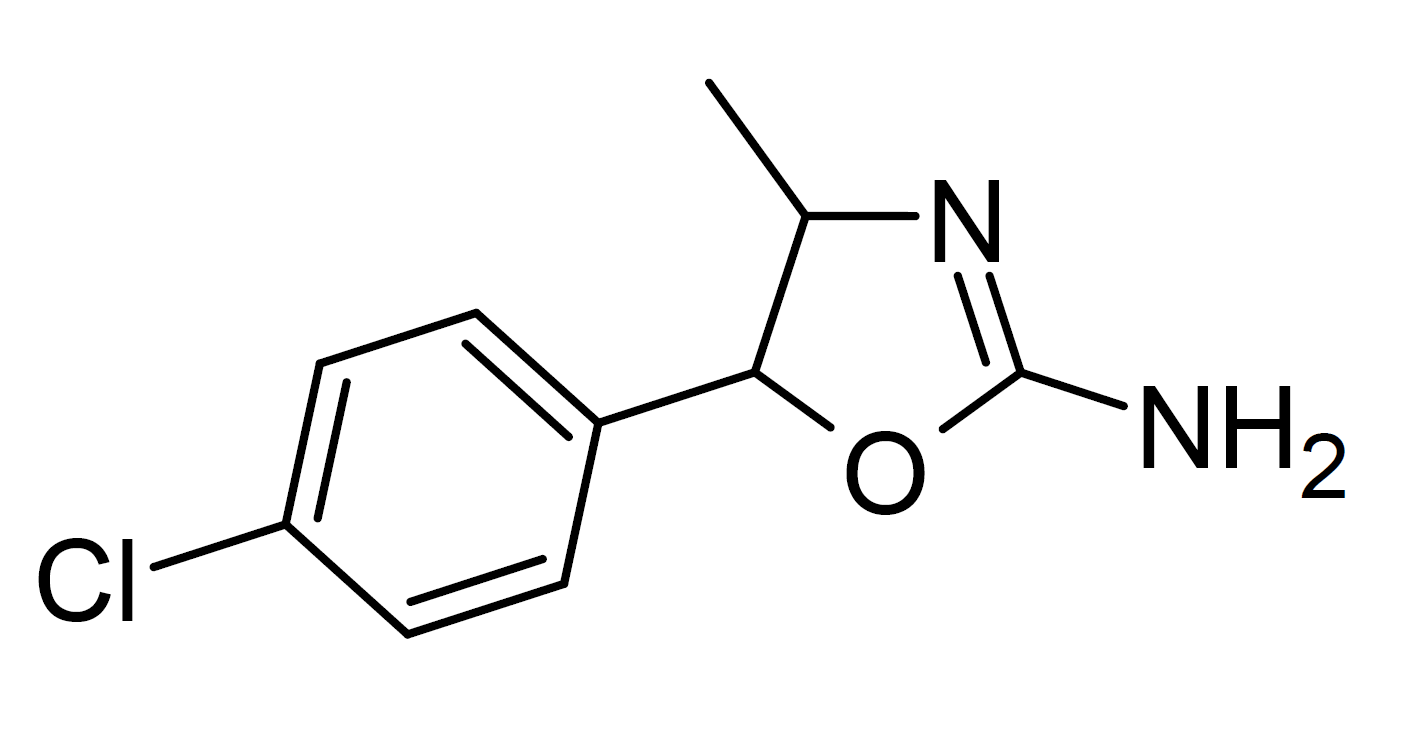

Identifiers
- IUPAC name: 4-methyl-5-(4-chlorophenyl)-4,5-dihydro-1,3-oxazol-2-amine
- CAS Number: 3063572-02-8
- PubChem CID: 165361753

Chemical and physical data
- Formula: C_{10}H_{11}ClN_{2}O
- Molar mass: 210.66 g·mol^{−1}
- 3D model (JSmol): Interactive image
- SMILES: CC1C(OC(=N1)N)C2=CC=C(C=C2)Cl
- InChI: InChI=1S/C10H11ClN2O/c1-6-9(14-10(12)13-6)7-2-4-8(11)5-3-7/h2-6,9H,1H3,(H2,12,13); Key:PEMJVPLFSLEVII-UHFFFAOYSA-N

4'-Chloro-4-methylaminorex (4C-MAR, 4'-Cl-4-MAR) is a recreational designer drug from the substituted aminorex family, with stimulant effects. It has reportedly been sold since around 2021 and was first definitively identified in Austria in January 2022.

== See also ==
- 2C-B-aminorex
- 2F-MAR
- 4B-MAR
- 4,4'-DMAR
- 4'-Fluoro-4-methylaminorex
- 4-Methylaminorex
- Clominorex
- MDMAR
- 4-Chloroamphetamine
- 4-Chloromethcathinone
