= Isostere =

Group of similar molecules or ions

Classical Isosteres are molecules or ions with similar shape and often electronic properties. Many definitions are available, but the term is usually employed in the context of bioactivity and drug development. Such biologically-active compounds containing an isostere is called a bioisostere. This is frequently used in drug design: the bioisostere will still be recognized and accepted by the body, but its functions there will be altered as compared to the parent molecule.

== History and additional definitions ==
Non-classical isosteres do not obey the above classifications, but they still produce similar biological effects in vivo. Non-classical isosteres may be made up of similar atoms, but their structures do not follow an easily definable set of rules.

The isostere concept was formulated by Irving Langmuir in 1919, and later modified by Grimm. Hans Erlenmeyer extended the concept to biological systems in 1932. Classical isosteres are defined as being atoms, ions and molecules that had identical outer shells of electrons, This definition has now been broadened to include groups that produce compounds that can sometimes have similar biological activities. Some evidence for the validity of this notion was the observation that some pairs, such as benzene, thiophene, furan, and even pyridine, exhibited similarities in many physical and chemical properties.
