= Perkin reaction =

Organic reaction developed by William Henry Perkin

Named after	William Henry Perkin
Reaction type	Condensation reaction

Reaction
Aromatic aldehyde
+
Aliphatic acid anhydride
+
Alkali salt of the acid
↓
Cinnamic acid derivatives

Identifiers
RSC ontology ID	RXNO:0000003
- (what is this?) (verify)

The Perkin reaction is an organic reaction developed by English chemist William Henry Perkin in 1868 that is used to make cinnamic acids. It gives an α,β-unsaturated aromatic acid or α-substituted β-aryl acrylic acid by the aldol condensation of an aromatic aldehyde and an acid anhydride, in the presence of an alkali salt of the acid. The alkali salt acts as a base catalyst, and other bases can be used instead.

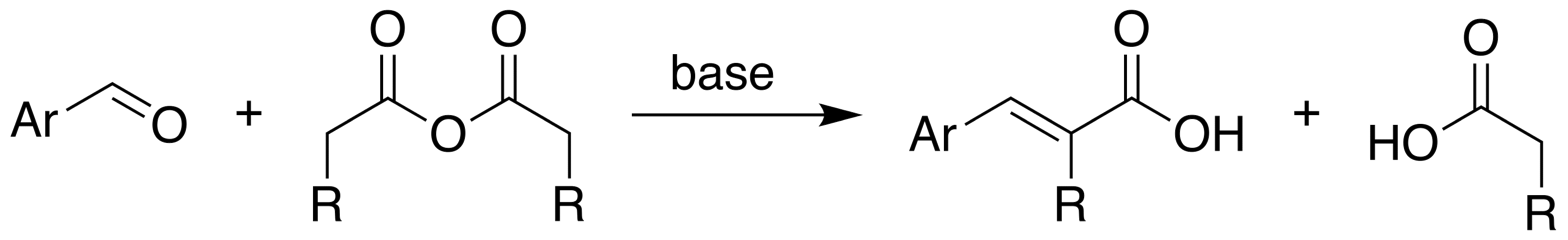
The Perkin reaction

Several reviews have been written.

== Reaction mechanism ==
The Perkin reaction

Clear from the reaction mechanism, the anhydride of aliphatic acid must contain at least 2 α-H for the reaction to occur. The above mechanism is not universally accepted, as several other versions exist, including decarboxylation without acetic group transfer.

== Applications ==
- Salicylaldehyde converted to coumarin using acetic anhydride with acetate as base.
- cinnamic acid is prepared from benzaldehyde, again using acetic anhydride in the presence of sodium or potassium acetate.
- resveratrol (cf. fo-ti), a phytoestrogenic stilbene is yet another product of this methodology.

== See also ==
- Erlenmeyer–Plöchl azlactone and amino-acid synthesis
- Stobbe condensation
- Pechmann condensation
