= 4,4'-Dimethylaminorex =

Chemical compound

Clinical data
- Other names: 4,4'-DMAR
- ATC code: none

Legal status
- Legal status: BR: Class F2 (Prohibited psychotropics); DE: Anlage II (Authorized trade only, not prescriptible); UK: Class A; US: Schedule I; Illegal in Czech Republic and Sweden

Identifiers
- IUPAC name: 4-Methyl-5-(4-methylphenyl)-4,5-dihydro-1,3-oxazol-2-amine
- CAS Number: 1445569-01-6
- PubChem CID: 20741615
- ChemSpider: 19546433
- UNII: 18Y239214S
- KEGG: C22805
- CompTox Dashboard (EPA): DTXSID901031562

Chemical and physical data
- Formula: C_{11}H_{14}N_{2}O
- Molar mass: 190.246 g·mol^{−1}
- 3D model (JSmol): Interactive image
- SMILES: CC(N=C(N)O1)C1C2=CC=C(C)C=C2
- InChI: InChI=1S/C11H14N2O/c1-7-3-5-9(6-4-7)10-8(2)13-11(12)14-10/h3-6,8,10H,1-2H3,(H2,12,13); Key:NPILLHMQNMXXTL-UHFFFAOYSA-N

4,4'-Dimethylaminorex (abbreviated as 4,4'-DMAR), sometimes referred to by the street name "Serotoni", is a psychostimulant and entactogen designer drug related to aminorex, 4-methylaminorex, and pemoline. It was first detected in the Netherlands in December 2012, and has been sold as a designer drug around Europe since 2012.

4,4'-DMAR had been linked to at least 31 deaths in Hungary, Poland, and the UK by February 2014, mostly when consumed in combination with other drugs. Nineteen deaths linked to 4,4'-DMAR were reported in Northern Ireland in the same time period.

== Pharmacology ==
=== Pharmacodynamics ===
4,4'-DMAR is a monoamine releasing agent (MRA) and acts specifically as a highly potent and well-balanced serotonin-norepinephrine-dopamine releasing agent (SNDRA), with EC_{50} values for serotonin, norepinephrine, and dopamine release of 18.5 nM, 26.9 nM, and 8.6 nM, respectively. It also interacts with the vesicular monoamine transporter 2 (VMAT2) with similar potency as MDMA.

Monoamine release of 4,4'-DMAR and related agents (EC_{50}, nM)
Compound	NE	DA	5-HT	Ref
Phenethylamine	10.9	39.5	>10,000	
Dextroamphetamine	6.6–10.2	5.8–24.8	698–1,765	
Dextromethamphetamine	12.3–14.3	8.5–40.4	736–1,292	
Aminorex	15.1–26.4	9.1–49.4	193–414	
cis-4-MAR	4.8	1.7	53.2	
cis-4,4'-DMAR	11.8–31.6	8.6–24.4	17.7–59.9	
trans-4,4'-DMAR	31.6	24.4	59.9	
cis-MDMAR	14.8	10.2	43.9	
trans-MDMAR	38.9	36.2	73.4	
Notes: The smaller the value, the more strongly the drug releases the neurotransmitter. The assays were done in rat brain synaptosomes and human potencies may be different. See also Monoamine releasing agent § Activity profiles for a larger table with more compounds. Refs:

In contrast to many other MRAs, 4,4'-DMAR is inactive as a trace amine-associated receptor 1 (TAAR1) agonist. As a result, whereas many other MRAs may auto-inhibit and constrain their effects via TAAR1 agonism, this may not occur with 4,4'-DMAR. The drug also shows very weak interactions with the serotonin 5-HT_{2A} and 5-HT_{2C} receptors, though appears to be inactive at the serotonin 5-HT_{2B} receptor.

== Legality ==
The UK Home Office expressed intent to ban 4,4'-DMAR following advice from the Advisory Council on the Misuse of Drugs and subsequently it became a class A drug on 11 March 2015.

4,4'-DMAR is an Anlage II controlled substance in Germany as of May 2015.

Sweden's public health agency suggested to classify 4,4'-DMAR as hazardous substance on November 10, 2014.

4,4'-DMAR is also banned in the Czech Republic.

4,4'-DMAR is a Schedule I controlled substance in the US as of November 8, 2021. It only received two public comments during its public commenting period prior to being scheduled.

== See also ==
- 2C-B-aminorex
- 2F-MAR
- 4C-MAR
- 4'-Fluoro-4-methylaminorex
- 4-Methylphenmetrazine
- MDMAR
- List of aminorex analogues
