= Friedrich Gustav Carl Emil Erlenmeyer =

German chemist (1864–1921)

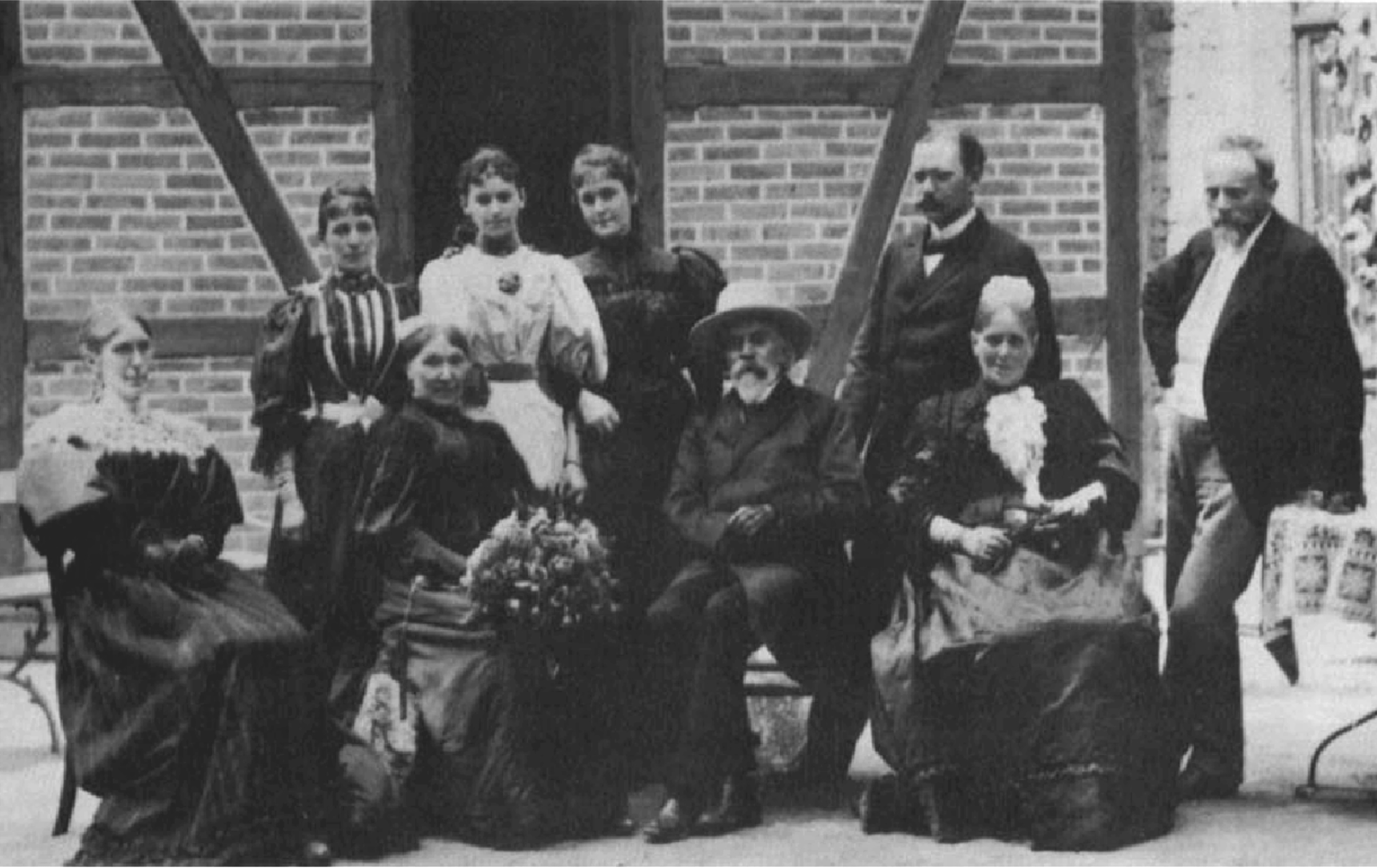
- Born: July 14, 1864; Heidelberg, Grand Duchy of Baden
- Died: February 8, 1921 (aged 56); Berlin, Germany
- Education: University of Göttingen, (1888)
- Known for: Erlenmeyer azlactone synthesis
- Scientific career
- Workplaces: University of Straßburg, kaiserliche biologische Anstallt Dahlem

Friedrich Gustav Carl Emil Erlenmeyer (July 14, 1864 – February 8, 1921), also known as Emil Erlenmeyer, Jr., was a German chemist and the discoverer of the Erlenmeyer-Plöchl azlactone and amino acid synthesis. He was the son of Richard August Carl Emil Erlenmeyer and father of Hans Erlenmeyer.

== Biography ==
Erlenmeyer was born in Heidelberg, but moved with his family to Munich in 1868. He studied at various universities in Heidelberg, Bonn, Darmstadt and Marburg. He received his Ph.D. in 1888 from the University of Göttingen. 1893 he started working at the University of Strasbourg and from 1907 till his death in 1921 he was working at the kaiserliche biologische Anstallt Dahlem.

His son, Hans Erlenmeyer (1900–1967), worked also as chemist.
