= Emil Erlenmeyer =

German chemist (1825–1909)

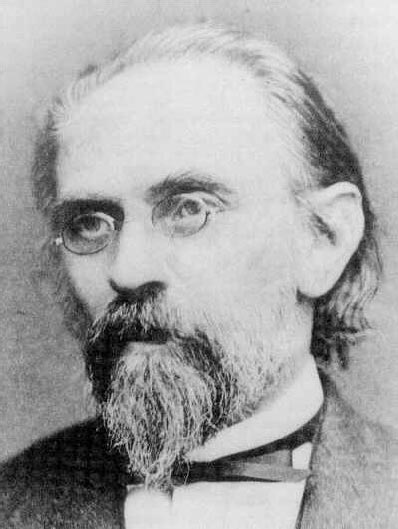
- Erlenmeyer before 1909
- Born: Richard August Carl Emil Erlenmeyer; 28 June 1825; Wehen, Duchy of Nassau, today Taunusstein, Germany
- Died: 22 January 1909 (aged 83); Aschaffenburg, German Empire
- Education: University of Gießen
- Known for: Erlenmeyer flask Erlenmeyer rule
- Scientific career
- Fields: Organic chemistry
- Workplaces: Munich Polytechnic School

Richard August Carl Emil Erlenmeyer (28 June 1825 – 22 January 1909), known simply as Emil Erlenmeyer, was a German chemist known for contributing to the early development of the theory of chemical structure and formulating the Erlenmeyer rule. He also designed the Erlenmeyer flask, a specialized apparatus ubiquitous in chemistry laboratories, which is named after him.

== Biography ==
=== Early life and education ===
Erlenmeyer was born in Wehen, Duchy of Nassau (today Taunusstein, Hesse, near Wiesbaden), in 1825, the son of a Protestant minister. He enrolled in the University of Giessen to study medicine, but after attending lectures of Justus von Liebig changed to chemistry. In the summer of 1846 he went to Heidelberg for one year, and studied physics, botany and mineralogy, returning to Giessen in 1847. After serving as assistant to H. Will and then to Carl Remigius Fresenius, Erlenmeyer decided to devote himself to pharmaceutical chemistry. For this purpose he studied in Nassau, where he passed the state pharmaceutical examination, and shortly afterwards acquired an apothecary's business, first at Katzenelnbogen and then in Wiesbaden. He became dissatisfied with pharmacy and returned to chemistry, finishing his doctorate at Giessen in 1850.For a short time he was also active politically and supported German nationalism and unification.

In 1855 he moved to Heidelberg to work on the chemistry of fertilizers in the laboratory of Robert Bunsen. He wished to teach, but Bunsen's associates were not allowed to take private students. Therefore, with his wife's help, he converted a shed into a private laboratory. In 1857 he became a privatdocent and his habilitation thesis "On the manufacture of the artificial manure known as superphosphate" contained a description of several crystalline substances which greatly interested Robert Bunsen. It was while at Heidelberg that Erlenmeyer was brought under the influence of August Kekulé, whose theoretical views he was one of the first to adopt. He was the first to suggest, in 1862, that double and triple bonds could form between carbon atoms, and he made other important contributions to the development of theories of molecular structure.

=== Academic career ===
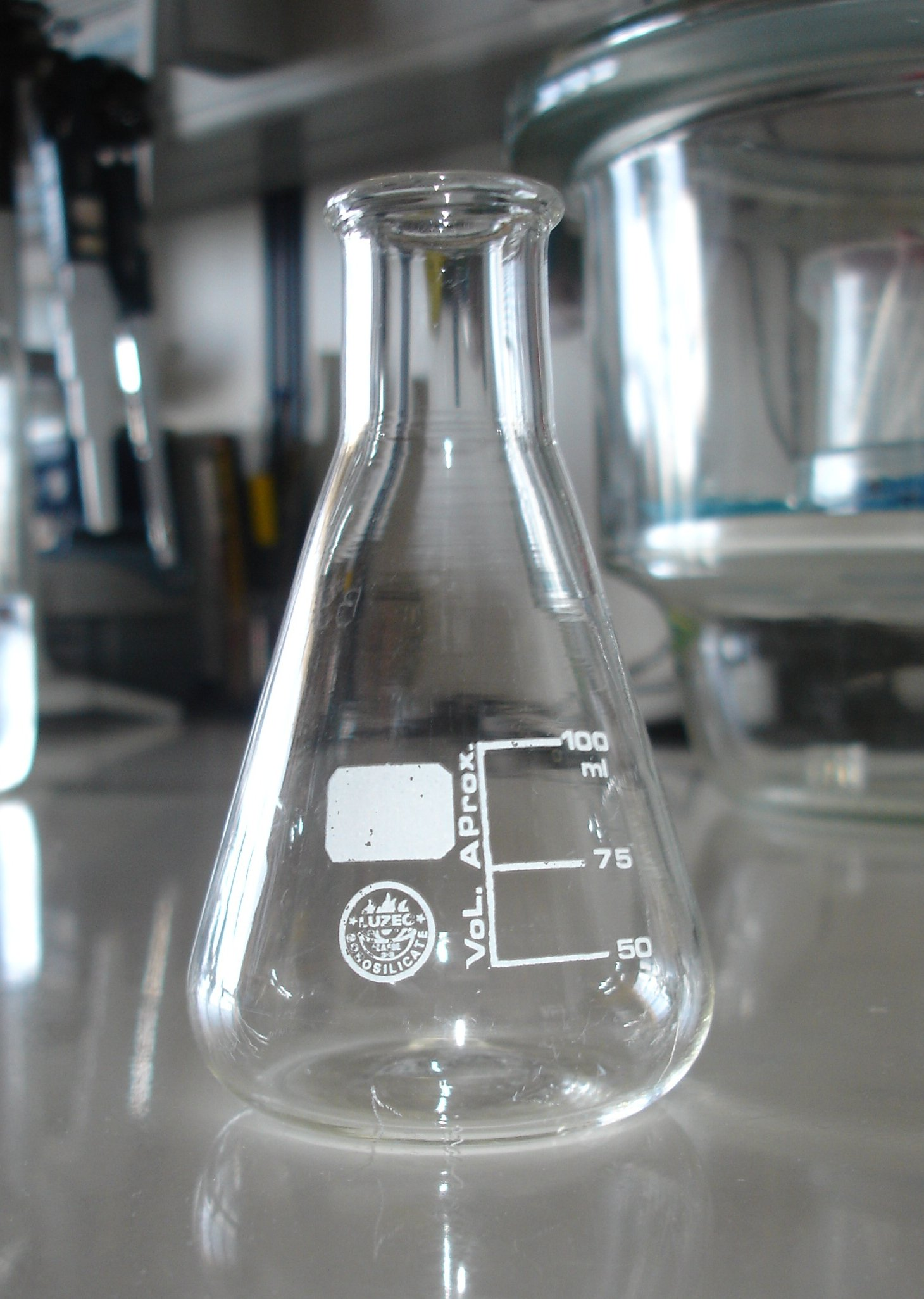
Erlenmeyer flask

In 1863 he became associate professor at the University of Heidelberg. In 1868 he was hired as a full professor in Munich to take charge of the laboratories of the new Munich Polytechnic School, a post which he held until he retired from teaching in 1883.

His work mostly focused on theoretical chemistry, where he suggested the structural formula for naphthalene. The Erlenmeyer rule states that all alcohols in which the hydroxyl group is attached directly to a double-bonded carbon atom become aldehydes or ketones (cf. keto-enol tautomerism).

Erlenmeyer's practical investigations were concerned mostly with aliphatic compounds. In 1859 he synthesised aminohexoic acid and proceeded to study the general behavior of albuminoids on hydrolysis. He worked out methods to determine the relative amounts of leucine and tyrosine, which are produced during the degradation of several substances of this class, and was the first (1860) to understand the nature of glycide and to suggest that this substance is related to glycerol in the same way as is metaphosphoric acid to orthophosphoric acid. In the following year he studied the action of hydroiodic acid on glycerol, and showed that the product was isopropyl- and not propyl iodide. His investigations of the higher alcohols produced during fermentation yielded the important proof that these alcohols do not belong to the normal series.

His other work included the isolation of glycolic acid from unripe grapes (1864), synthesis of sodium oxalate by heating sodium formate (1868), hydrolysis of ether to alcohol (1858), synthesis of phenyl-lactic acid (1880), preparation of pyruvic acid by the distillation of tartaric acid (1881) and the formation of carbostyril from quinoline (1885).

His investigations in the aromatic series include isomerism of the cinnamic acids and the synthesis of tyrosine from phenylalanine (1882). In 1875, by nitrating benzoic acid, Erlenmeyer disproved the prevalent opinion that more than three nitrobenzoic acids exist.

In 1860 he published a description of the conical flask that bears his name.

== Lineage ==
Emil Erlenmeyer is the grandfather of Hans Erlenmeyer.
