= Nirvanol =

Chemical compound

Clinical data
- Other names: 5-Ethyl-5-phenylhydantoin
- Routes of administration: By mouth
- ATC code: None

Identifiers
- IUPAC name: 5-Ethyl-5-phenylimidazolidine-2,4-dione
- CAS Number: 631-07-2
- PubChem CID: 91480
- ChemSpider: 82605
- UNII: 23SM1FA1AK
- CompTox Dashboard (EPA): DTXSID80874185
- ECHA InfoCard: 100.010.138

Chemical and physical data
- Formula: C_{11}H_{12}N_{2}O_{2}
- Molar mass: 204.229 g·mol^{−1}
- 3D model (JSmol): Interactive image
- SMILES: CCC1(C(=O)NC(=O)N1)C2=CC=CC=C2
- InChI: InChI=InChI=1S/C11H12N2O2/c1-2-11(8-6-4-3-5-7-8)9(14)12-10(15)13-11/h3-7H,2H2,1H3,(H2,12,13,14,15); Key:UDTWZFJEMMUFLC-UHFFFAOYSA-N

Nirvanol, also known as ethylphenylhydantoin, is a derivative of hydantoin with anticonvulsant properties. Its 5-ethyl-5-phenyl substitution pattern is similar to that of phenobarbital. It was one of the first effective treatments for chorea.

== Metabolism ==
Metabolism of nirvanol is stereoselective, with the (S)- enantiomer undergoing roughly 14 times more hydroxylation at the 4 position of the phenyl group than the (R)-enantiomer.
