= Propyl iodide =

Iodide name

Propyl iodide may refer to:

- n-Propyl iodide
- Isopropyl iodide
