= 3-Phenylazoacetylacetone =

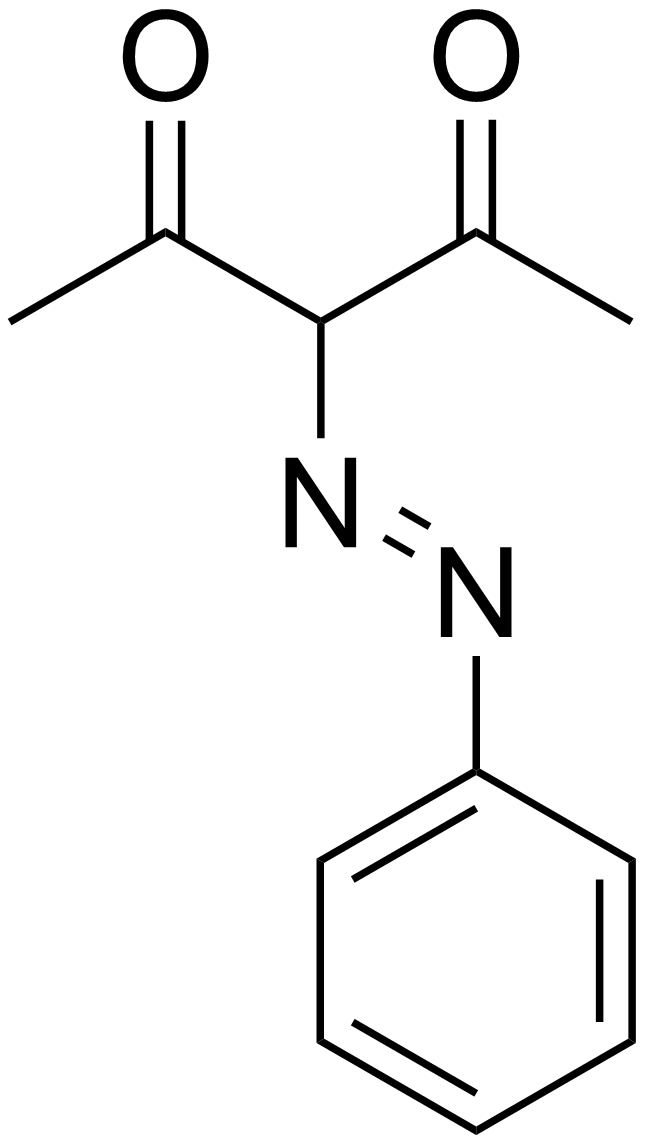

Names
- Preferred IUPAC name 3-[(E)-Phenyldiazenyl]pentane-2,4-dione
- Other names Phenyl-azo-acetylacetone; 3-(Phenylazo)pentane-2,4-dione

Identifiers
CAS Number	56276-49-4
3D model (JSmol)	Interactive image; Interactive image
ChemSpider	82881
ECHA InfoCard	100.054.609
PubChem CID	91785
UNII	4LP68P99TS
- InChI: InChI=1S/C11H12N2O2/c1-8(14)11(9(2)15)13-12-10-6-4-3-5-7-10/h3-7,11H,1-2H3/b13-12+ Key: KZPRCESDIPAEAE-OUKQBFOZSA-N; InChI=1/C11H12N2O2/c1-8(14)11(9(2)15)13-12-10-6-4-3-5-7-10/h3-7,11H,1-2H3/b13-12+ Key: KZPRCESDIPAEAE-OUKQBFOZBS
- SMILES: CC(=O)C(C(=O)C)N=NC1=CC=CC=C1; O=C(C(/N=N/c1ccccc1)C(=O)C)C

Properties
Chemical formula	C_{11}H_{12}N_{2}O_{2}
Molar mass	204.229 g·mol^{−1}
Melting point	96 °C (205 °F; 369 K)
- Except where otherwise noted, data are given for materials in their standard state (at 25 °C [77 °F], 100 kPa). verify (what is ?) Infobox references

3-Phenylazoacetylacetone (or phenyl-azo-acetylaceton) is a chemical compound used as an intermediate in the preparation of biologically active compounds, chelating agents, and dyes.

Preparation has been described as involving the gradual addition of a solution of benzenediazonium chloride exactly neutralized with sodium carbonate to a cold solution of acetylacetone in aqueous sodium carbonate.

== Additional sources ==
- Baeyer and Claisen's phenylazoacetylacetone (Abstr., 1888, 828)
