= 2F-MAR =

Chemical compound

2'-Fluoro-4-methylaminorex
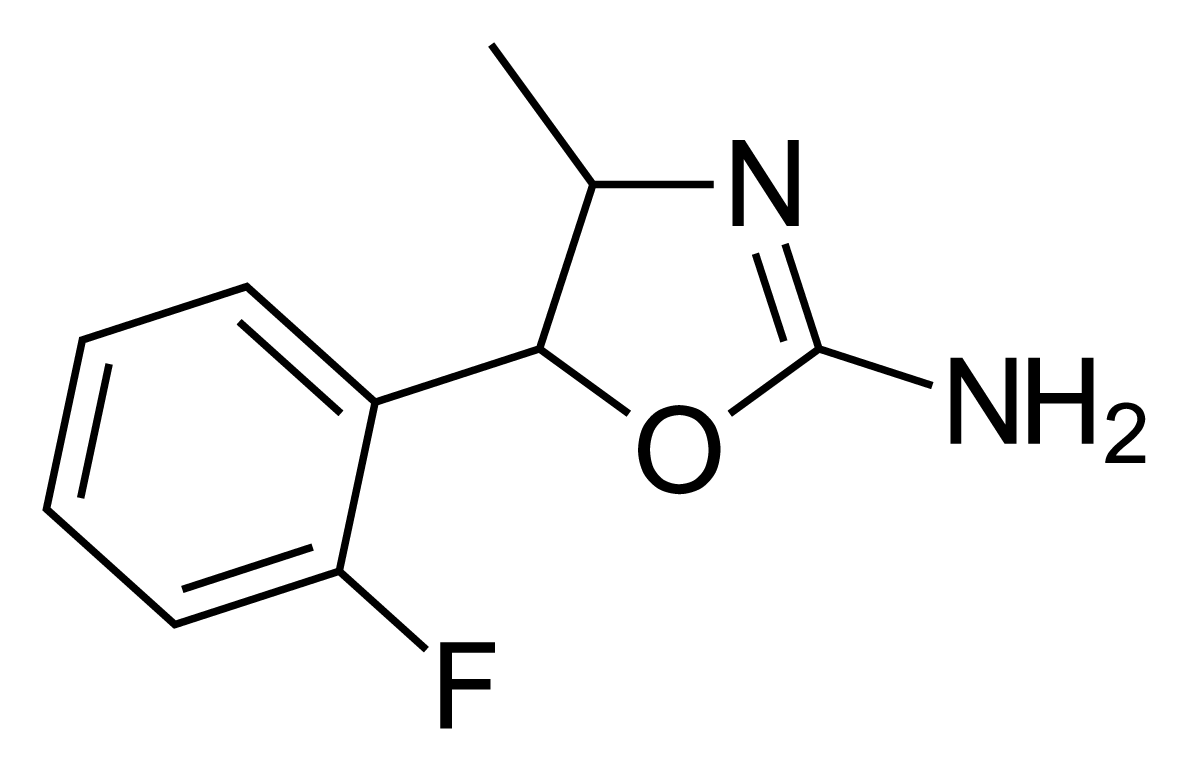

Identifiers
- IUPAC name: 4-methyl-5-(2-fluorophenyl)-4,5-dihydro-1,3-oxazol-2-amine
- CAS Number: none
- PubChem CID: 172871878
- ChemSpider: 129340975

Chemical and physical data
- Formula: C_{10}H_{11}FN_{2}O
- Molar mass: 194.209 g·mol^{−1}
- 3D model (JSmol): Interactive image
- SMILES: Fc1ccccc1C1OC(N)=NC1C
- InChI: InChI=1S/C10H11FN2O/c1-6-9(14-10(12)13-6)7-4-2-3-5-8(7)11/h2-6,9H,1H3,(H2,12,13); Key:JTKNTGJEZDOJAB-UHFFFAOYSA-N

2'-Fluoro-4-methylaminorex (2F-MAR, 2'-F-4-MAR) is a recreational designer drug from the substituted aminorex family, with stimulant effects, first reported in 2018.

== See also ==
- 2C-B-aminorex
- 4,4'-DMAR
- 4'-Fluoro-4-methylaminorex
- 4-Methylaminorex
- 4C-MAR
- MDMAR
- 2-Fluoroamphetamine
- 2-Fluoromethamphetamine
