= 2C-B-aminorex =

Chemical compound

Clinical data
- Other names: 2C-B-AR

Legal status
- Legal status: In general Unscheduled

Identifiers
- IUPAC name: 5-(4-bromo-2,5-dimethoxyphenyl)-4,5-dihydro-1,3-oxazol-2-amine
- PubChem CID: 165360199
- ChemSpider: 129433828
- UNII: HBY9BQ3YJK
- CompTox Dashboard (EPA): DTXSID901336883

Chemical and physical data
- Formula: C_{11}H_{13}BrN_{2}O_{3}
- Molar mass: 301.140 g·mol^{−1}
- 3D model (JSmol): Interactive image
- SMILES: COC1=CC(=C(C=C1C2CN=C(O2)N)OC)Br
- InChI: InChI=1S/C11H13BrN2O3/c1-15-8-4-7(12)9(16-2)3-6(8)10-5-14-11(13)17-10/h3-4,10H,5H2,1-2H3,(H2,13,14)/t10-/m0/s1; Key:XUTCHZHTIDHQOP-JTQLQIEISA-N

2C-B-aminorex (2C-B-AR) is a recreational designer drug with psychedelic and/or stimulant effects. It is a substituted aminorex derivative which was first identified in Sweden in June 2019. Structurally, it is a hybrid of 4-bromo-2,5-dimethoxyphenethylamine (2C-B) and aminorex.

== See also ==
- Cyclized phenethylamine
- 2C-B-morpholine
- 2C-B-PP
- 2C-B-3PIP
- BOB
- 4,4'-DMAR
- 4'-Fluoro-4-methylaminorex
- 4B-MAR
- 4C-MAR
- List of aminorex analogues
