= Fenozolone =

Group of stereoisomers

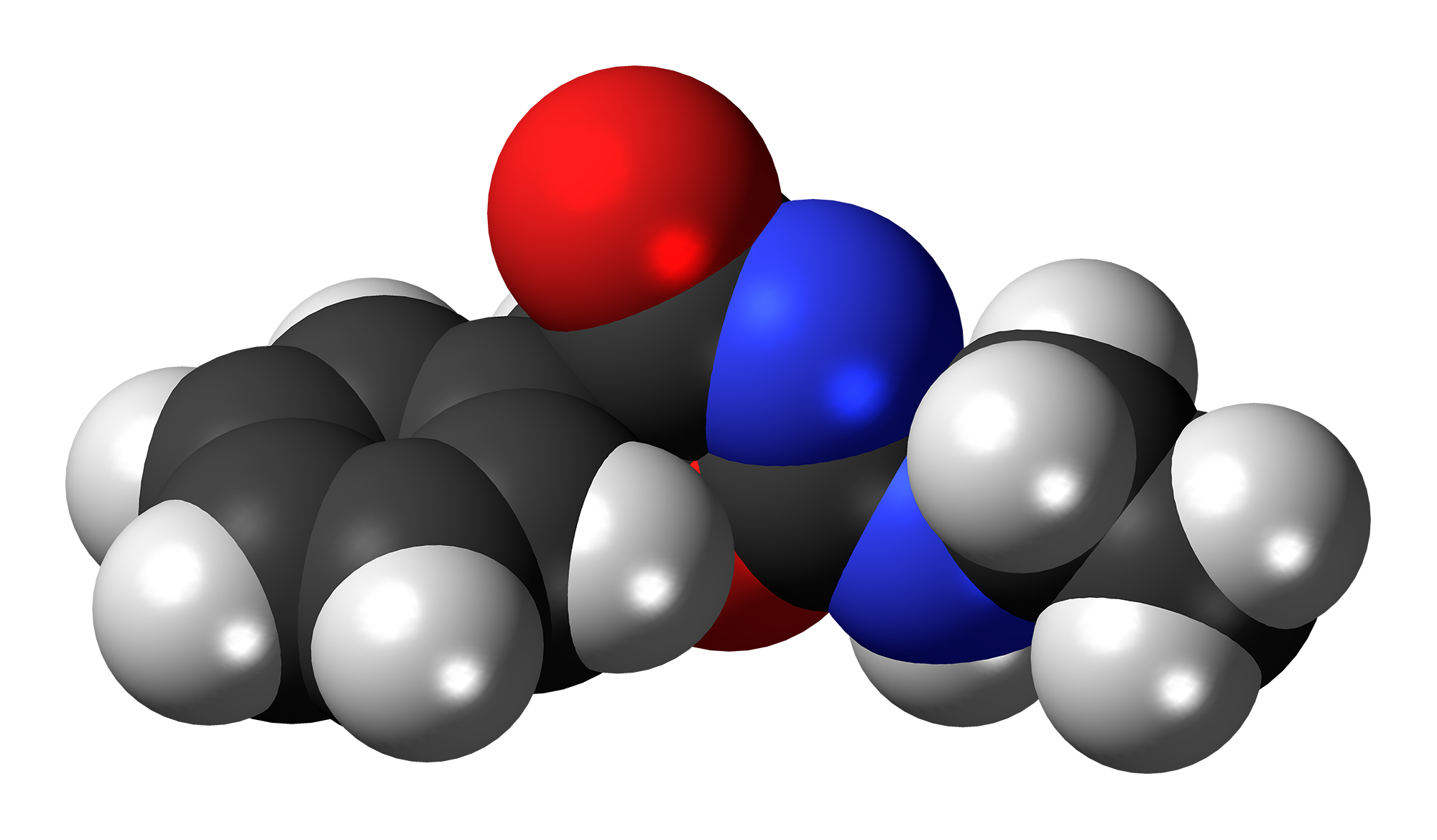

Clinical data
- Routes of administration: Oral
- ATC code: N06BA08 (WHO)

Identifiers
- IUPAC name: (RS)-2-ethylamino-5-phenyl-1,3-oxazol-4-one
- CAS Number: 15302-16-6
- PubChem CID: 71682
- ChemSpider: 64736
- UNII: 1NZI4LMU6G
- KEGG: D07344
- ChEBI: CHEBI:134865
- ChEMBL: ChEMBL2104907
- CompTox Dashboard (EPA): DTXSID00864583
- ECHA InfoCard: 100.035.747

Chemical and physical data
- Formula: C_{11}H_{12}N_{2}O_{2}
- Molar mass: 204.229 g·mol^{−1}
- 3D model (JSmol): Interactive image
- Chirality: Racemic mixture
- SMILES: O=C1\N=C(/OC1c2ccccc2)NCC
- InChI: InChI=1S/C11H12N2O2/c1-2-12-11-13-10(14)9(15-11)8-6-4-3-5-7-8/h3-7,9H,2H2,1H3,(H,12,13,14); Key:RXOIEVSUURELPG-UHFFFAOYSA-N

Fenozolone (Ordinator) was developed by Laboratoires Dausse in the 1960s and is a psychostimulant related to pemoline.

== See also ==
- 4-Methylaminorex
- Aminorex
- Clominorex
- Cyclazodone
- Fluminorex
- Pemoline
- Thozalinone
