= Pemoline =

Stimulant, used in the treatment of ADHD

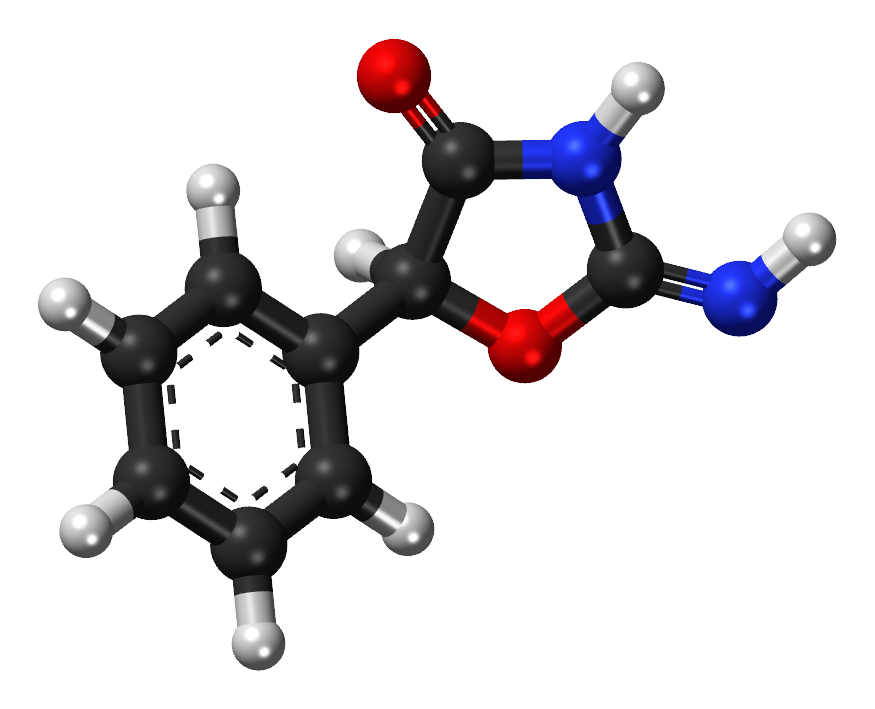

Clinical data
- Trade names: Cylert, others
- Other names: Pheniminooxazolidinone; Phenylisohydantoin; Phenylpseudohydantoin; Phenilone; 2-Imino-5-phenyl-4-oxazolidinone; 2-Amino-5-phenyl-1,3-oxazol-4(5H)-one
- AHFS/Drugs.com: Micromedex Detailed Consumer Information
- Routes of administration: By mouth
- Drug class: Stimulant; Dopamine reuptake inhibitor; Dopamine releasing agent
- ATC code: N06BA05 (WHO)

Legal status
- Legal status: AU: S4 (Prescription only); BR: Class B1 (Psychoactive drugs); CA: Schedule IV; DE: Prescription only (Anlage III for higher doses); US: Schedule IV

Pharmacokinetic data
- Protein binding: ≤50%
- Metabolism: Liver
- Metabolites: Various
- Elimination half-life: 7–12 hours
- Excretion: Mainly urine

Identifiers
- IUPAC name: (RS)-2-amino-5-phenyl-1,3-oxazol-4(5H)-one
- CAS Number: 2152-34-3
- PubChem CID: 4723
- DrugBank: DB01230
- ChemSpider: 4561
- UNII: 7GAQ2332NK
- KEGG: D00744
- ChEBI: CHEBI:7953
- ChEMBL: ChEMBL1177
- CompTox Dashboard (EPA): DTXSID3023427
- ECHA InfoCard: 100.016.763

Chemical and physical data
- Formula: C_{9}H_{8}N_{2}O_{2}
- Molar mass: 176.175 g·mol^{−1}
- 3D model (JSmol): Interactive image
- Chirality: Racemic mixture
- SMILES: O=C2\N=C(/OC2c1ccccc1)N
- InChI: InChI=1S/C9H8N2O2/c10-9-11-8(12)7(13-9)6-4-2-1-3-5-6/h1-5,7H,(H2,10,11,12); Key:NRNCYVBFPDDJNE-UHFFFAOYSA-N

Pemoline, formerly sold under the brand name Cylert among others, is a stimulant medication which was used in the treatment of attention deficit hyperactivity disorder (ADHD) and narcolepsy. It has since been discontinued in most countries due to rare but serious liver toxicity. The medication was taken by mouth.

Common side effects include insomnia, decreased appetite, abdominal pain, irritability, and headaches, while rare cases of serious liver damage requiring liver transplantation or causing death have been reported. As a stimulant, pemoline acts as a selective dopamine reuptake inhibitor and releasing agent via indirect agonism of dopamine receptors. In addition, it shows little activity with respect to norepinephrine, thus minimal to no cardiovascular or sympathomimetic effects in comparison to many other stimulants.

Pemoline was first synthesized in 1913, but its stimulant activity was not discovered until the 1930s, nor used for ADHD until 1975. Between 1997 and 2005, many countries, including the United States, withdrew the drug due to liver toxicity. However, it remains available in Japan for the treatment of narcolepsy at lower doses than those used for ADHD. Pemoline is a schedule IV controlled substance in the United States due to structural and functional similarity to other stimulants, and potential for misuse. However, it is noted to have less misuse potential than other stimulant drugs.

== Medical uses ==
Pemoline has been used in the treatment of ADHD and narcolepsy. It has also been used in the treatment of excessive daytime sleepiness. The medication was typically used at doses of 18.75 to 112.5 mg once per day in the treatment of ADHD, with the effective dose for most people being in the range of 56.25 to 75 mg. The onset of action of pemoline is gradual and therapeutic benefits may not occur until the third or fourth weeks of use. This may be due to a cautious low initial starting dose of 37.5 mg and gradual titration in dose upwards over several weeks.

=== Available forms ===
Pemoline was available in the form of 18.75, 37.5, and 75 mg oral immediate-release tablets (Cylert) as well as 37.5 mg oral immediate-release chewable tablets. It was provided mainly in the form of the free base but also as the magnesium salt.

== Side effects ==
Side effects of pemoline include insomnia, decreased appetite, abdominal pain, irritability, and headaches. It has minimal cardiovascular or sympathomimetic side effects. Pemoline is described as a lower-efficacy/milder stimulant than classical stimulants like amphetamines and methylphenidate and is said to have fewer side effects than them.

=== Liver toxicity ===
Rarely, pemoline is implicated in causing hepatotoxicity. Because of this, the FDA recommended that regular liver tests be performed in those treated with it. Since being introduced, it has been linked with at least 21 cases of liver failure, of which 13 resulted in liver replacement or death. Approximately 1–2% of patients taking the drug show elevated levels of liver transaminase enzymes, a marker for liver toxicity, though serious cases are rare. Over 200,000 children with ADHD were prescribed pemoline in the United States and Canada alone during the approximate 25 years that it was available, plus a smaller number of adults prescribed it for other indications (and not including prescriptions in the rest of the world). As such, the number of liver failure cases was statistically not that large. However the reactions proved idiosyncratic and unpredictable, with patients sometimes taking the drug with no issue for months or even years, before suddenly developing severe liver toxicity. There was no clear exposure–toxicity relationship, and no characteristic liver pathology findings. Some patients showed as little as one week between first appearance of jaundice and complete liver failure, and some of the patients that developed liver failure had not showed elevated liver transaminase levels when tested previously. On the other hand, there are no cases of liver failure associated with pemoline in Japan, although it is used at lower doses and is only prescribed for the niche indication of narcolepsy in this country.

== Overdose ==
Overdose of pemoline may present with choreoathetosis symptoms.

== Interactions ==
Other stimulants and monoamine oxidase inhibitors are contraindicated with pemoline.

== Pharmacology ==
=== Pharmacodynamics ===
The pharmacodynamics of pemoline are poorly understood and its precise mechanism of action hasn't been definitively determined. However, pemoline has similar activity and effects to those of other psychostimulants, and in animals the medication appears to act as a dopamine reuptake inhibitor and releasing agent. By increasing dopamine levels in the brain, it functions as an indirect agonist of dopamine receptors. In contrast to most other stimulants, pemoline appears to produce no significant central or peripheral noradrenergic effects. As a result, it has minimal or no cardiovascular or sympathomimetic effects. Pemoline is described as a selective dopamine reuptake inhibitor that only weakly stimulates dopamine release.

While drugs like dextroamphetamine and methylphenidate are classified as schedule II and have considerable misuse potential, pemoline is listed as schedule IV (non-narcotic). In studies conducted on primates, pemoline fails to demonstrate a potential for self-administration. It is thought to have little potential for abuse and dependence. Nonetheless, misuse may theoretically occur owing to its similarity to other psychostimulants.

=== Pharmacokinetics ===
Studies of the pharmacokinetics of pemoline in humans are very limited. The time to peak levels of pemoline is 2 to 4 hours. Peak levels have been reported to be in the range of 2 to 4.5 μg/mL. Steady-state levels of pemoline are reached in 2 to 3 days.

Pemoline is variously reported to have no significant plasma protein binding or to have 50% plasma protein binding.

Pemoline is metabolized in the liver. Its metabolites include pemoline conjugate, pemoline dione, mandelic acid, and unidentified polar metabolites.

Pemoline is excreted mainly by the kidneys with around 50% excreted in unchanged form and only minor amounts present as metabolites. The elimination half-life of pemoline is 7 to 12 hours. The half-life is 7 hours in children but may increase to 11 to 12 hours with age. The relatively long half-life of pemoline allows for once-daily administration.

No differences in the pharmacokinetics of pemoline were found with conventional tablets, chewable tablets swallowed, or chewable tablets chewed.

== Chemistry ==
Pemoline is a member of the 4-oxazolidinone class and is structurally related to other members of the class including aminorex, 4-methylaminorex, clominorex, cyclazodone, fenozolone, fluminorex, and thozalinone.

The salts of pemoline in use are pemoline magnesium (free base conversion ratio .751), pemoline iron (.578), pemoline copper (.644), pemoline nickel (.578), pemoline rubidium, pemoline calcium, pemoline chromium, and chelates of the above which are identical in weight to the salt mentioned. Pemoline free base and pemoline cobalt, strontium, silver, barium, lithium, sodium, potassium, zinc, manganese, and caesium are research chemicals which can be produced in situ for experiments. Others such as lanthanide pemoline salts such as pemoline cerium can be prepared; pemoline beryllium would presumably be toxic.

== History ==
Pemoline was first synthesized in 1913 but its activity was not discovered until the 1930s. Pemoline was approved for the treatment of ADHD in the United States in 1975.

Cases of serious liver toxicity and associated death related to pemoline in children and adolescents were reported to the United States Food and Drug Administration's MedWatch between 1977 and 1996. Serious liver toxicity with pemoline was first described in the medical literature in 1984 and 1989 letters to the editor. Clinicians were little-aware of liver toxicity with pemoline until the 1990s. Warnings for liver toxicity for pemoline were added to the United States Food and Drug Administration (FDA) label for the medication in December 1996 and a black box warning was added in June 1999 along with requirements for written consent and frequent monitoring of liver enzymes. These warnings followed a 1995 publication on liver toxicity with pemoline. However, findings suggested that clinicians poorly followed the FDA's directives on use of pemoline. In any case, sales of pemoline in the United States increased until 1997 and declined between 1996 and 1999. Pemoline was withdrawn due to liver toxicity in the United Kingdom in September 1997, in Canada in September 1999, and in the United States in 2005. Abbott Laboratories voluntarily withdrew pemoline from the United States market in May 2005 and the FDA withdrew approval of generic pemoline in November 2005. Pemoline remains available in Japan for treatment of narcolepsy as of 2017.

== Society and culture ==
=== Names ===
Pemoline is the generic name of the drug and its INN, USAN, and BAN.

Pemoline was formerly marketed under the brand names Cylert, Betanamin, Ceractiv, Hyperilex, Kethamed, Ronyl, Stimul, Tamilan, Tradon, Tropocer, and Volital.

=== Availability ===
Pemoline has been marketed in the United States, Canada, the United Kingdom, Belgium, Luxembourg, Spain, Germany, Switzerland, Japan and Argentina. It remains available in Japan for the treatment of narcolepsy as of 2017. However, the medication is said to be rarely used in Japan as narcolepsy is a niche indication and as clinicians are wary of the liver toxicity that it has been associated with.

=== Legal status ===
Under the Convention on Psychotropic Substances, it is a schedule IV controlled substance. Pemoline is Schedule IV Non-Narcotic (Stimulant) controlled substance with a DEA ACSCN of 1530 and is not subject to annual manufacturing quotas.

== Research ==
=== Fatigue ===
Pemoline has been studied in and reported to be effective in the treatment of fatigue due to multiple sclerosis and HIV-related disease.
