= Cyclazodone =

Chemical compound

Clinical data
- Routes of administration: Oral
- ATC code: none

Legal status
- Legal status: In general: legal

Identifiers
- IUPAC name: (RS)-2-(cyclopropylamino)-5-phenyl-1,3-oxazol-4-one
- CAS Number: 14461-91-7
- PubChem CID: 26701
- ChemSpider: 24875
- UNII: O8U55ZRL9K
- ChEMBL: ChEMBL2106536
- CompTox Dashboard (EPA): DTXSID60864509

Chemical and physical data
- Formula: C_{12}H_{12}N_{2}O_{2}
- Molar mass: 216.240 g·mol^{−1}
- 3D model (JSmol): Interactive image
- Chirality: Racemic mixture
- SMILES: C1CC1NC2=NC(=O)C(O2)C3=CC=CC=C3
- InChI: InChI=1S/C12H12N2O2/c15-11-10(8-4-2-1-3-5-8)16-12(14-11)13-9-6-7-9/h1-5,9-10H,6-7H2,(H,13,14,15); Key:DNRKTAYPGADPGW-UHFFFAOYSA-N

Cyclazodone is a centrally acting stimulant drug developed by American Cyanamid Company in the 1960s. The drug is related to other drugs such as pemoline and thozalinone. It displayed a favorable therapeutic index and margin of safety in comparison to most other pemoline derivatives. The patents concluded that cyclazodone possessed properties efficacious in reducing fatigue and as a potential anorectic. Structural congeners of pemoline have been described as "excitants with unique properties distinguishing them from the sympathomimetic amines" whilst displaying less stimulatory activity and toxicity compared to amphetamine.

It is included under the World Anti-Doping Agency prohibited list.

== Safety ==
Cyclazodone has not been evaluated by the United States Food and Drug Administration for use in humans as a nootropic, anorectic, or stimulant and thus safety information is lacking. However, in studies relating to the therapeutic uses of cyclazodone, it was noted that it exhibited less cardiotoxic effects than dextroamphetamine in studies on mice.

== Synthesis ==

α-Chlorophenylacetyl chloride (1) and N-cyclopropylurea (2) react to give the diketone (3). Ring closure with sodium ethoxide in ethanol completes the synthesis.

== See also ==
- Fenozolone
- Amiphenazole
- List of aminorex analogues
