= 4'-Fluoro-4-methylaminorex =

Chemical compound

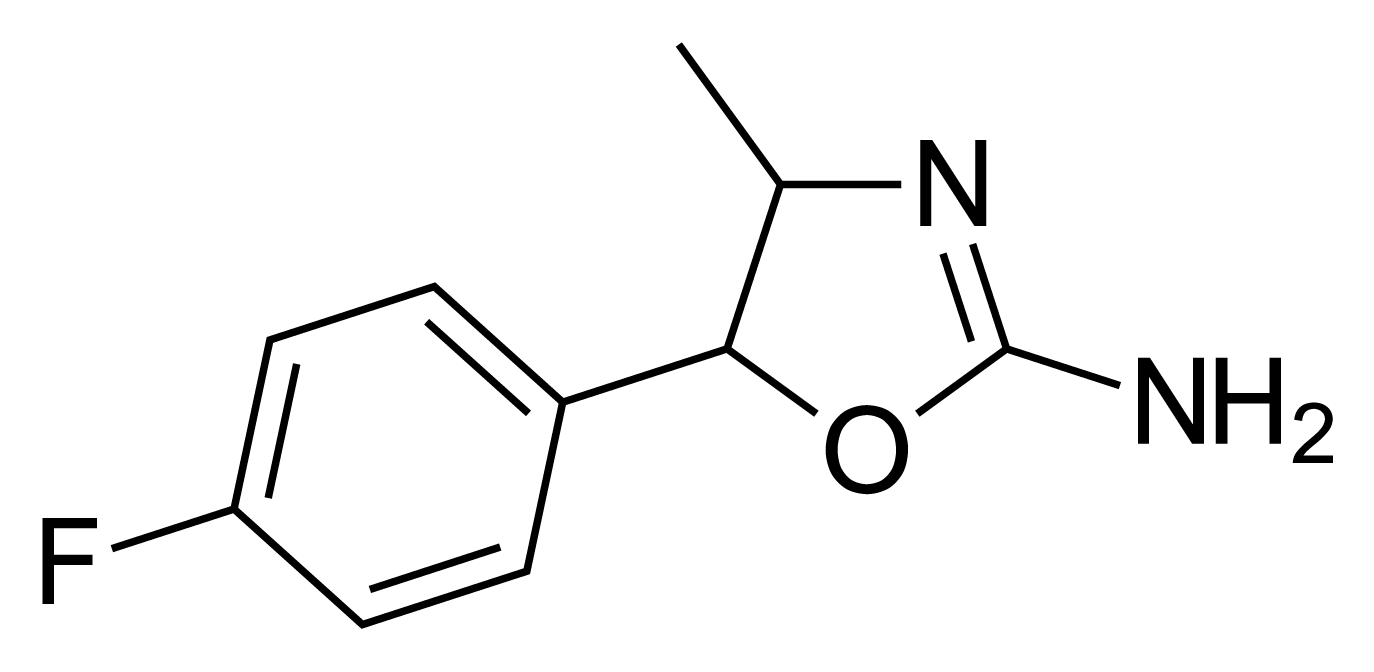

Identifiers
- IUPAC name: 4-methyl-5-(4-fluorophenyl)-4,5-dihydro-1,3-oxazol-2-amine
- CAS Number: 1364933-64-1
- PubChem CID: 134080816
- ChemSpider: 78231362
- UNII: QMW9X4B373
- CompTox Dashboard (EPA): DTXSID501336900

Chemical and physical data
- Formula: C_{10}H_{11}FN_{2}O
- Molar mass: 194.209 g·mol^{−1}
- 3D model (JSmol): Interactive image
- SMILES: Fc1ccc(cc1)C1OC(N)=NC1C
- InChI: InChI=1S/C10H11FN2O/c1-6-9(14-10(12)13-6)7-2-4-8(11)5-3-7/h2-6,9H,1H3,(H2,12,13); Key:UYKYWISHPDEDRQ-UHFFFAOYSA-N

4'-Fluoro-4-methylaminorex (4F-MAR, 4-FPO) is a recreational designer drug from the substituted aminorex family, with stimulant effects. It was first detected in Slovenia in 2018. It was made illegal in Italy in March 2020.

== See also ==
- 2C-B-aminorex
- 2F-MAR
- 3-Fluorophenmetrazine
- 4C-MAR
- 4-Fluoroamphetamine
- 4,4'-DMAR
- Fluminorex
- MDMAR
- List of aminorex analogues
