= Thozalinone =

Chemical compound

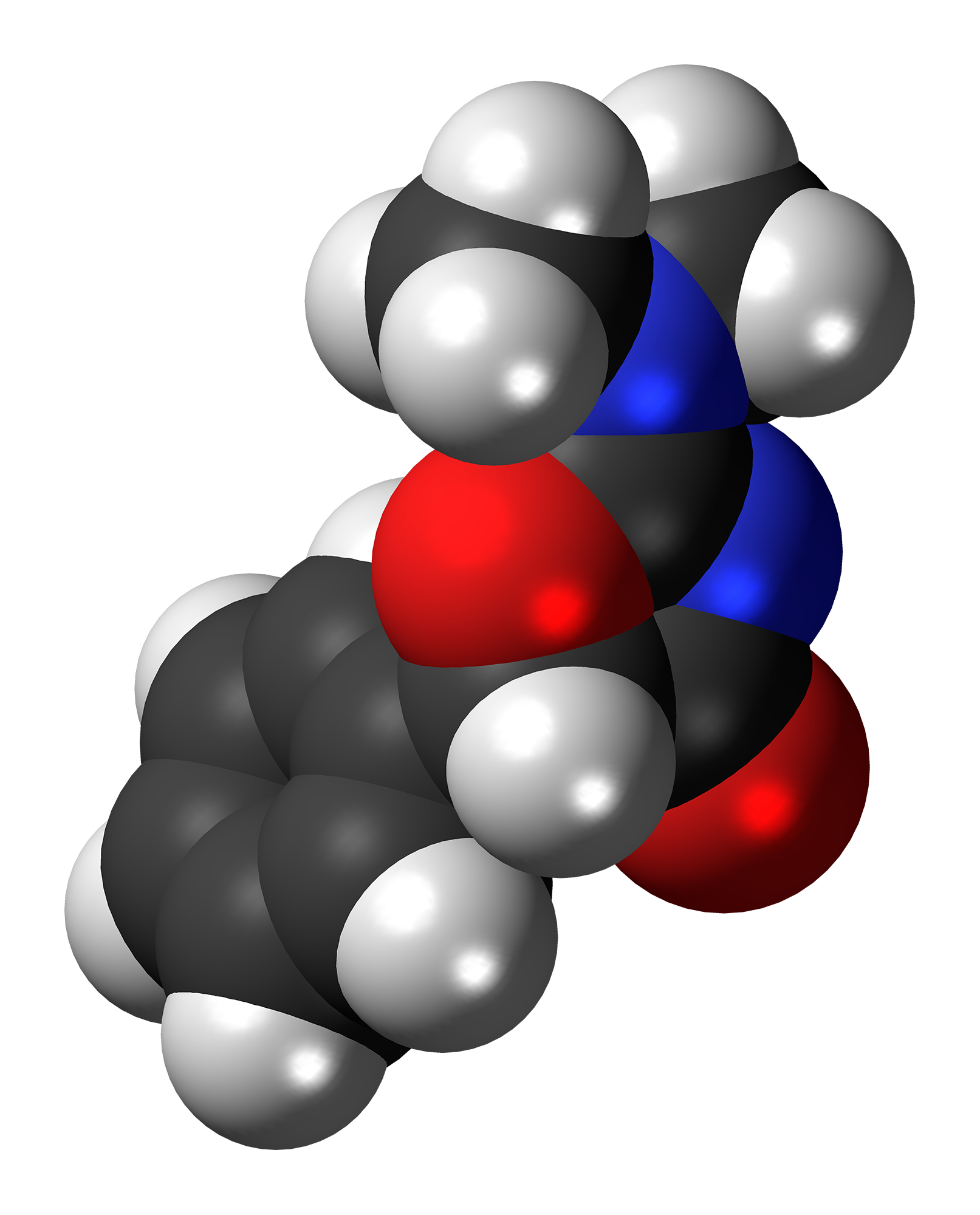

Clinical data
- Other names: Tozalinone, Thozalinon
- Routes of administration: Oral
- ATC code: none

Legal status
- Legal status: In general: ℞ (Prescription only)

Identifiers
- IUPAC name: (RS)-2-(Dimethylamino)-5-phenyl-1,3-oxazol-4(5H)-one
- CAS Number: 655-05-0
- PubChem CID: 12602
- ChemSpider: 12082
- UNII: 68X5932947
- KEGG: D06115
- ChEMBL: ChEMBL2105457
- CompTox Dashboard (EPA): DTXSID70862359

Chemical and physical data
- Formula: C_{11}H_{12}N_{2}O_{2}
- Molar mass: 204.229 g·mol^{−1}
- 3D model (JSmol): Interactive image
- Chirality: Racemic mixture
- SMILES: O=C2\N=C(/OC2c1ccccc1)N(C)C
- InChI: InChI=1S/C11H12N2O2/c1-13(2)11-12-10(14)9(15-11)8-6-4-3-5-7-8/h3-7,9H,1-2H3; Key:JJSHYECKYLDYAR-UHFFFAOYSA-N

Thozalinone (USAN) (brand name Stimsen; former developmental code name CL-39808) is a psychostimulant that has been used as an antidepressant in Europe. It has also been trialed as an anorectic. Thozalinone is described as a "dopaminergic stimulant", and likely acts via inducing the release of dopamine and to a minimal extent norepinephrine; similar to analogue pemoline, it is reportedly devoid of abuse potential unlike most other dopaminergic psychostimulants.

== Synthesis ==
Synthesis:

Sodium hydride is used as a strong base to abstract the alcohol proton in ethyl mandelate [774-40-3] (1); addition of this alkoxide to dimethylcyanamide [1467-79-4] gives the intermediate (2). Intramolecular cyclization then occurs giving Thozalinone (3).

=== Notes ===
- In treatment of Parkinsonism: W. D. Gray, C. E. Edward, U.S. patent 3,665,075 (1972 to Am. Cyanamid).
- Pharmacological studies:

== See also ==
- 3F-Thozalinone
- Fenozolone
