= 4-Methylaminorex =

Group of stereoisomers

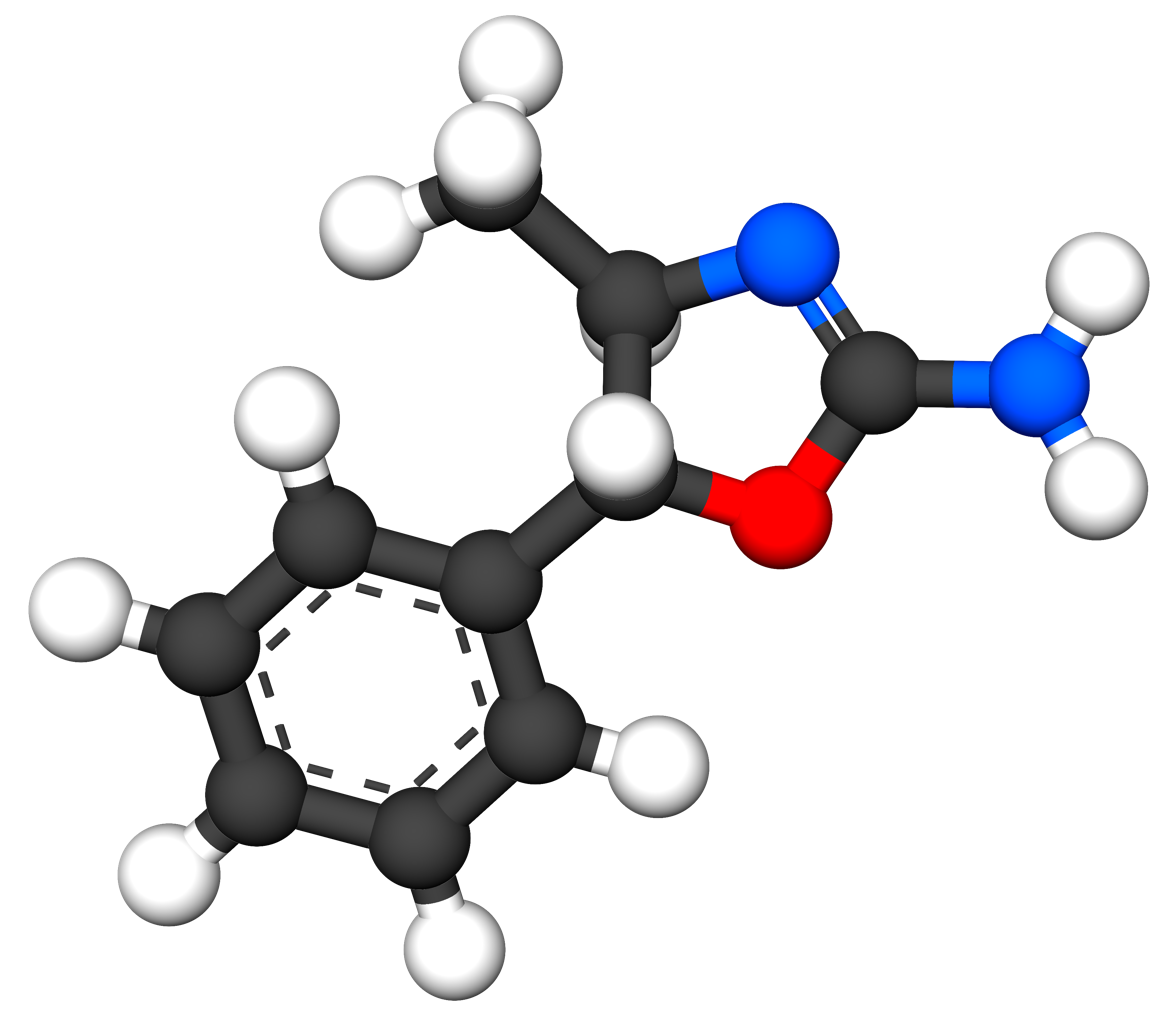

Clinical data
- Other names: 4-MAR; 4-MAX; McN-822; McN822
- Routes of administration: Oral, Vaporized, Insufflated, Injected
- Drug class: Norepinephrine-dopamine releasing agent

Legal status
- Legal status: AU: S9 (Prohibited substance); BR: Class F2 (Prohibited psychotropics); CA: Schedule III; DE: Anlage I (Authorized scientific use only); UK: Class A; US: Schedule I; UN: Psychotropic Schedule I

Pharmacokinetic data
- Bioavailability: 62% oral; 79% nasal; 91 - 93.5% smoked; 100% IV
- Metabolism: Hepatic
- Elimination half-life: 10-19 hours
- Excretion: Renal

Identifiers
- IUPAC name: 4-Methyl-5-phenyl-4,5-dihydro-1,3-oxazol-2-amine
- CAS Number: 3568-94-3; (±)-cis: 29493-77-4
- PubChem CID: 92196
- DrugBank: DB01447
- ChemSpider: 83237
- UNII: 7PK6VC94OU; (±)-cis: 2149QZM652
- KEGG: C22731
- CompTox Dashboard (EPA): DTXSID30860432

Chemical and physical data
- Formula: C_{10}H_{12}N_{2}O
- Molar mass: 176.219 g·mol^{−1}
- 3D model (JSmol): Interactive image
- Chirality: Racemic mixture
- SMILES: CC1C(C2=CC=CC=C2)OC(N)=N1
- InChI: InChI=1S/C10H12N2O/c1-7-9(13-10(11)12-7)8-5-3-2-4-6-8/h2-7,9H,1H3,(H2,11,12); Key:LJQBMYDFWFGESC-UHFFFAOYSA-N

4-Methylaminorex (4-MAR, 4-MAX) is a stimulant drug of the 2-amino-5-aryloxazoline group that was first synthesized in 1960 by McNeil Laboratories. It is also known by its street name "U4Euh" ("Euphoria"). It is banned in many countries as a stimulant. 4-Methylaminorex has effects comparable to methamphetamine but with a longer duration.

== Chemistry ==
4-Methylaminorex exists as four stereoisomers : (±)-cis and (±)-trans. The (±)-cis isomers are the form used recreationally.

=== Synthesis ===
The (±)-cis isomers [racemate (1:1-mixture) of the (4R,5S)-isomer and the enantiomeric (4S,5R)-isomer] generally synthesized from dl-phenylpropanolamine in one step by cyclization with cyanogen bromide (sometimes prepared in situ by reacting sodium cyanide with bromine).

Alternate synthesis routes generally involve more steps, such as replacing cyanogen bromide with sodium or potassium cyanate to form an intermediate and then reacting it with concentrated hydrochloric acid. A method reported in microgram replaced the need for a separate addition of hydrochloric acid by starting with the hydrochloride salt of the dl-phenylpropanolamine but side-products are noted.

The (±)-trans isomers [racemate (1:1-mixture) of the (4S,5S)-isomer and the enantiomeric (4R,5R)-isomer] are synthesized in the same manner above but dl-norephedrine is used as the starting material instead. The cyanate reaction proceeds differently from the cyanogen bromide and transforms norephedrine into trans-4-methylaminorex instead, as noted in the DEA micrograph. The cyanogen bromide, by comparison, transformed norephedrine into the cis isomer and norpseudoephedrine into the trans isomers of the final product.

== Dosage ==
4-Methylaminorex can be smoked, insufflated or taken orally.

As an anorectic, the ED50 is 8.8 mg/kg in rats for the (±)-cis isomers. The (±)-trans isomers are slightly more potent at 7.0 mg/kg. As a recreational drug, the effective dosage ranges from 5 to 25 mg.

In the 1970s McNeil Laboratories explored development of 4-methylaminorex as a sympathomimetic (most commonly used as asthma-medicines) under the research name McN-822. Their target human dose was 0.25 mg/kg of body weight. They also reported a p.o. LD50 of 17 mg/kg in mice

There is a patent about the use of 4-methylaminorex as a nasal decongestant that does not produce adverse central nervous system stimulation that is typical of other nasal decongestants. The dose references is 0.25 mg/kg of body weight.

== Effects ==
4-methylaminorex produces long-lasting effects, generally up to 16 hours in duration if taken orally and up to 12 hours if smoked or insufflated. Large doses have been reported anecdotally to last up to 36 hours. The effects are stimulant in nature, producing euphoria, increased attention, and increased cognition. Anecdotally, it has been reported to produce effects similar to nootropics. However, there is no research to support the claim that it is different or more effective than other psychostimulants in this respect. Moreover, 4-methylaminorex does not have the established safety profile of widely used clinical psychostimulants such as methylphenidate and dextroamphetamine.

Time (h)	Urinary levels (μg/ml)
0-6	45
6-24	1.0
24-36	0.1
36-48	not detected

There has been one reported death due to 4-methylaminorex and diazepam—‌concentrations of 4-methylaminorex were 21.3 mg/L in blood and 12.3 mg/L in urine. Diazepam concentration in blood was 0.8 mg/L. One experiment on rats has studied excretion of 4-methylaminorex in urine: "The concentration of trans-4-methylaminorex in rat urine following four injections of the trans-4S,5S isomer 5 mg/kg i.p each, at intervals of 12 h in 2 days, as measured quantitatively by GC/MS".

Another study focused on pharmacokinetics and tissue distribution of the stereoisomers of 4-methylaminorex in rats.

"Pulmonary hypertension has been associated with ingestion of the appetite suppressant aminorex. A similar compound, 4-methylaminorex, was discovered on the property of three individuals with diagnoses of pulmonary hypertension."

== Neurotoxicity studies ==
There have been three studies studying possible neurotoxicity of 4-methylaminorex. First study using quite high doses (highest dose caused clonic seizures and some rats died) in rats and studying short-term effects (rats were killed 30 min to 18 h after injection of 5, 10 or 20 mg/kg of racemic cis-4-methylaminorex) suggested reduction in tryptophan hydroxylase (TPH) activity (a possible marker for serotonin neurotoxicity) but citing study: "No change in TPH activity was observed 30 min after injection; by 8 h the activity of this enzyme appeared to be recovering." and "this agent is significantly less neurotoxic than methamphetamine or MDMA."

A study published 2 years later than first one also suggested reduction in tryptophan hydroxylase activity, they used quite high dose too (10 mg/kg of cis-4-methylaminorex) and studied also long-term effects (rats were killed 3 h, 18 h or 7 days after injection), they found reduction of 20-40% of tryptophan hydroxylase (TPH) activity and "recovery of TPH activity occurred 18 h after treatment, but was significantly decreased again by 7 days." but "It is noteworthy that, unlike the other analogs, the striatal levels of 5-HT did not decline with TPH activity following multiple 4-methylaminorex treatment"

The latest study (using mice) was not able to find any long-term effects suggesting neurotoxicity and instead found an increase in serotonin levels, they also used high doses (15 mg/kg of each isomers studied) "The dosages used in the present experiments are about 6-10 times than the effective doses of aminorex and stereoisomers inhibition of food intake." Doses were repeated 3 times a day and mice were killed 7 days after last dose. "Since a long-lasting depletion of dopamine or 5-HT appears to be a good predictor of dopamine or 5-HT neurotoxicity (Wagner et al. 1980; Ricaurte et al. 1985), the results suggest that the aminorex compounds except 4S,5S-dimethylaminorex, unlike MDMA or fenfluramine, are not toxic to either dopamine or 5-HT neurotransmitter systems in the CBA strain of mice. It was reported that although multiple doses of 4-methylaminorex caused long-term, i.e., seven-day, declines in striatal tryptophan hydroxylase activity in SD rats, no changes were found in 5-HT and 5-HIAA levels (Hanson et al. 1992).

That first study [11] also suggested reduced dopamine (DA) levels (a possible marker for dopamine neurotoxicity), but citing study: "However, 8 h after drug administration no differences from control values were seen in DA, DOPAC or HVA levels." and again later studies [12-13] didn't find any long-term reduction.

== Pharmacology ==
Monoamine release of 4-MAR and related agents (EC_{50}, nM)
Compound	NE	DA	5-HT	Ref
Phenethylamine	10.9	39.5	>10,000	
Dextroamphetamine	6.6–10.2	5.8–24.8	698–1,765	
Dextromethamphetamine	12.3–14.3	8.5–40.4	736–1,292	
Aminorex	15.1–26.4	9.1–49.4	193–414	
cis-4-MAR	4.8	1.7	53.2	
cis-4,4'-DMAR	11.8–31.6	8.6–24.4	17.7–59.9	
trans-4,4'-DMAR	31.6	24.4	59.9	
cis-MDMAR	14.8	10.2	43.9	
trans-MDMAR	38.9	36.2	73.4	
Notes: The smaller the value, the more strongly the drug releases the neurotransmitter. The assays were done in rat brain synaptosomes and human potencies may be different. See also Monoamine releasing agent § Activity profiles for a larger table with more compounds. Refs:

4-MAR acts as a highly potent monoamine releasing agent (MRA). It is specifically a norepinephrine–dopamine releasing agent (NDRA) with weak effects on serotonin. The drug's EC_{50} values for induction of monoamine neurotransmitter release have been found to be 4.8 nM for norepinephrine, 1.7 nM for dopamine, and 53.2 nM for serotonin. It is among the most potent and selective dopamine releasing agents (DRAs) known.

In contrast to many other MRAs, 4-MAR is inactive at the mouse and rat trace amine-associated receptor 1 (TAAR1). Similarly, 4,4'-dimethylaminorex (4,4'-DMAR) is inactive at the mouse and rat TAAR1. Many other monoamine releasing agents (MRAs), such as many amphetamines, are rodent and/or human TAAR1 agonists. Activation of the TAAR1 may auto-inhibit and thereby constrain the monoaminergic effects of these agents. Lack of TAAR1 agonism in the case of aminorex analogues might enhance their effects relative to MRAs possessing TAAR1 agonism.

=== Misuse potential ===
The results of animal experiments conducted with this drug suggest that it has an abuse liability similar to cocaine and amphetamine. One study found that, "stimulus properties of racemic cis, racemic trans, and all four individual optical isomers of 4-methylaminorex were examined in rats trained to discriminate 1 mg/kg of S(+)amphetamine sulfate from saline. The S(+)amphetamine stimulus generalized to all of the agents investigated". A second study in which rats trained to discriminate either 0.75 mg/kg S(+)-amphetamine or 1.5 mg/kg fenfluramine from saline generalized to aminorex as amphetamine stimulus but not to fenfluramine. Rats trained to discriminate 8 mg/kg cocaine from saline generalized 4-methylaminorex to cocaine-stimulus. The reinforcing effects of cis-4-methylaminorex were determined in two models of intravenous drug self-administration in primates. Vehicle or 4-methylaminorex doses were substituted for cocaine. One of the two different doses of 4-methylaminorex maintained self-administration behavior above vehicle control levels.
