= C15H17N =

The molecular formula C_{15}H_{17}N (molar mass: 211.30 g/mol, exact mass: 211.1361 u) may refer to:

- 2,2-Diphenylpropylamine
- 2,3-Diphenylpropylamine
- 3,3-Diphenylpropylamine
