= 2C-G =

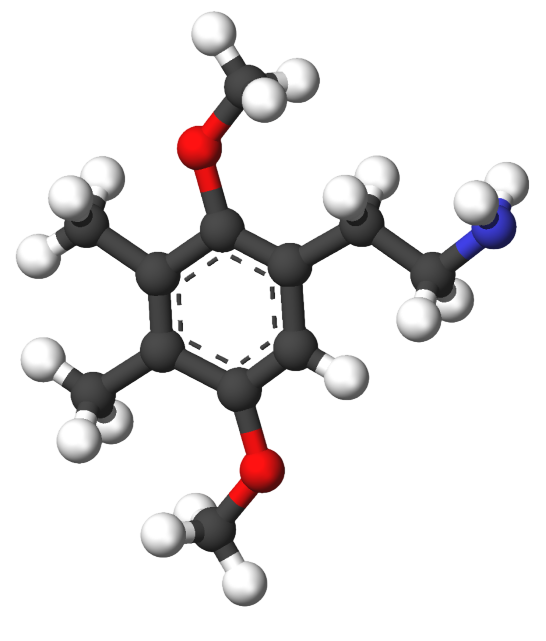

Clinical data
- Other names: 2C-G-0; 2,5-Dimethoxy-3,4-dimethylphenethylamine; 3,4-Dimethyl-2,5-dimethoxyphenethylamine; 3-Methyl-2C-D
- Routes of administration: Oral
- Drug class: Serotonergic psychedelic; Hallucinogen
- ATC code: None

Legal status
- Legal status: In general Unscheduled

Pharmacokinetic data
- Onset of action: 2 hours (peak)
- Duration of action: 18–30 hours

Identifiers
- IUPAC name: 2-(2,5-dimethoxy-3,4-dimethylphenyl)ethan-1-amine
- CAS Number: 207740-18-9
- PubChem CID: 22238091
- ChemSpider: 21106224
- UNII: DTG7FMO01J
- ChEMBL: ChEMBL127202
- CompTox Dashboard (EPA): DTXSID70174848

Chemical and physical data
- Formula: C_{12}H_{19}NO_{2}
- Molar mass: 209.289 g·mol^{−1}
- 3D model (JSmol): Interactive image
- SMILES: COc1c(C)c(C)c(cc1CCN)OC
- InChI: InChI=1S/C12H19NO2/c1-8-9(2)12(15-4)10(5-6-13)7-11(8)14-3/h7H,5-6,13H2,1-4H3; Key:NFOHGLKGLZIHJQ-UHFFFAOYSA-N

2C-G, or 2C-G-0, also known as 3,4-dimethyl-2,5-dimethoxyphenethylamine or as 3-methyl-2C-D, is a psychedelic phenethylamine of the 2C family. First synthesized by Alexander Shulgin, it has structural and pharmacodynamic properties similar to 2C-D and Ganesha (G). The drug has a number of known homologues, which are known as the 2C-G series of compounds.

== Use and effects ==
In his book PiHKAL (Phenethylamines I Have Known and Loved), Alexander Shulgin lists 2C-G's dose range as 20 to 35 mg orally and its duration as 18 to 30 hours. The time to peak effects was described as being 2 hours. The effects of 2C-G have been reported to include little in the way of visuals, being a "true psychedelic", mental changes, insights, altered sense of taste, "energy tremor", stomach queasiness, and a feeling of heat in the upper back. The drug is said to have very similar properties and effects as its amphetamine homologue Ganesha (G). Its similar potency to Ganesha is in contrast to other 2Cs and psychedelic phenethylamines, which are less potent than their amphetamine homologues.

== Chemistry ==
=== Synthesis ===
The chemical synthesis of 2C-G has been described.

=== Homologues ===
Several homologues of 2C-G (2C-G-0) were also synthesized and/or tested by Alexander Shulgin. These include 2C-G-3, 2C-G-5, and 2C-G-N. Some, such as 2C-G-1, 2C-G-2, 2C-G-4, and 2C-G-6, are possible to synthesize in principle but impossible or extraordinarily difficult to do so in practice.

Compound	Details	Structure
2C-G-1	CAS #: 2888537-47-9 The synthesis of this compound has not been reported, but it is described prophetically in WO2022271982; DOx analogue: None	
2C-G-2	CAS #: 2888537-48-0 The synthesis of this compound has not been reported, but it is described prophetically in WO2022271982; DOx analogue: None	
2C-G-3	CAS #: 207740-19-0 Dose: 16–25 mg Duration: 12–24 hours Effects: Some visual effects. General euphoria with an underlying sense of paranoia. DOx analogue: G-3	
2C-G-4	CAS #: 952006-59-6 Partially synthesized but not tested. DOx analogue: G-4	
2C-G-5	CAS #: 207740-20-3 Dose: 10–16 mg Duration: 32–48 hours Effects: Similar to 2C-B for some users. General euphoria (sometimes followed by irritability), often leading to tiredness (likely due to duration). DOx analogue: G-5	
2C-G-6	CAS #: 2888537-49-1 The synthesis of this compound has not been reported, but it is described prophetically in WO2022271982; DOx analogue: None	
2C-G-N	CAS #: 207740-21-4 Dose: 20–40 mg Duration: 20–30 hours Effects: Stimulation similar to that caused by amphetamines. General sense of unease or unfriendliness for most. 2C-G-N is sometimes called 2C-NPH due to the naphthalene portion of the molecule. DOx analogue: G-N	

== History ==
2C-G was first described in the literature by Alexander Shulgin in his 1991 book PiHKAL (Phenethylamines I Have Known and Loved).

== Society and culture ==
=== Legal status ===
==== Canada ====
As of October 31, 2016; 2C-G is a controlled substance (Schedule III) in Canada.

==== United Kingdom ====
2C-G and all other compounds featuring in PiHKAL are Class A drugs in the United Kingdom.

==== United States ====
In the United States 2C-G is considered a Schedule I controlled substance as a positional isomer of 2C-E and DOM.

== See also ==
- 2C (psychedelics)
- Ganesha (G)
- DOTMA (Julia)
