= 2C-G-4 =

Clinical data
- Other names: 2,5-Dimethoxy-3,4-(tetramethylene)phenethylamine; 3,4-Tetramethylene-2,5-dimethoxyphenethylamine; 6-(2-Aminoethyl)-5,8-dimethoxytetralin
- Routes of administration: Unknown
- ATC code: None

Pharmacokinetic data
- Onset of action: Unknown
- Duration of action: Unknown

Identifiers
- IUPAC name: 2-(1,4-dimethoxy-5,6,7,8-tetrahydronaphthalen-2-yl)ethanamine
- CAS Number: 952006-59-6
- PubChem CID: 44719505
- ChemSpider: 23553010
- UNII: JZ93A3108G
- CompTox Dashboard (EPA): DTXSID201024776

Chemical and physical data
- Formula: C_{14}H_{21}NO_{2}
- Molar mass: 235.327 g·mol^{−1}
- 3D model (JSmol): Interactive image
- SMILES: COC1=C2CCCCC2=C(C(=C1)CCN)OC
- InChI: InChI=1S/C14H21NO2/c1-16-13-9-10(7-8-15)14(17-2)12-6-4-3-5-11(12)13/h9H,3-8,15H2,1-2H3; Key:LBXJFOGUUUOECQ-UHFFFAOYSA-N

2C-G-4, also known as 2,5-dimethoxy-3,4-(tetramethylene)phenethylamine or as 6-(2-aminoethyl)-5,8-dimethoxytetralin, is a chemical compound of the phenethylamine and 2C families. It is the derivative of 2C-G (2C-G-0) in which the 3,4-dimethyl groups have been connected via two additional carbon atoms to form a cyclohexane ring attached to the benzene ring and hence has a tetralin (1,2,3,4-tetrahydronaphthalene) ring system.

The compound was included by Alexander Shulgin as an entry in his 1991 book PiHKAL (Phenethylamines I Have Known and Loved). However, Shulgin was unable to complete the last step of the chemical synthesis of the compound and never tested it. In any case, he anticipated that it would be an active compound. The synthesis of 2C-G-4 has been described.

2C-G-4 was first described in the literature by Shulgin in PiHKAL in 1991. It is a controlled substance in Canada under phenethylamine blanket-ban language.

== See also ==
- 2C (psychedelics)
- 2C-G (2C-G-0)
- 2C-G-3, 2C-G-5, and 2C-G-N
- Ganesha and G-4
- 6-APT (TAP)
