= 2,6-Dimethylmescaline =

Clinical data
- Other names: DMe-M; Dimethylmescaline; 2,6-Dimethyl-3,4,5-trimethoxyphenethylamine; 3,4,5-Trimethoxy-2,6-dimethylphenethylamine
- Drug class: Serotonin receptor modulator
- ATC code: None

Identifiers
- IUPAC name: 2-(3,4,5-trimethoxy-2,6-dimethylphenyl)ethan-1-amine

Chemical and physical data
- Formula: C_{13}H_{21}NO_{3}
- Molar mass: 239.315 g·mol^{−1}
- 3D model (JSmol): Interactive image
- SMILES: NCCc1c(C)c(OC)c(c(c1C)OC)OC
- InChI: InChI=1S/C13H21NO3/c1-8-10(6-7-14)9(2)12(16-4)13(17-5)11(8)15-3/h6-7,14H2,1-5H3; Key:VUZBXFVHLMPADZ-UHFFFAOYSA-N

2,6-Dimethylmescaline, or simply dimethylmescaline (DMe-M), also known as 2,6-dimethyl-3,4,5-trimethoxyphenethylamine, is a serotonin receptor modulator of the phenethylamine and scaline families related to mescaline. It is the 2,6-dimethyl derivative of mescaline.

The drug shows affinity for the serotonin 5-HT_{1A}, 5-HT_{2A}, and 5-HT_{2C} receptors (K_{i} = 45 nM, 879 nM, and 1,002 nM, respectively). These affinities were 66-fold, 5.2-fold, and 7.7-fold higher than those of mescaline, respectively. The drug has not been tested in animals or humans.

2,6-Dimethylmescaline was first described in the scientific literature by Daniel Trachsel and colleagues in 2013. The source of the information cited by Trachsel and colleagues was a personal communication with David E. Nichols in 2010. It is not a controlled substance in Canada as of 2025.

== See also ==
- Scaline
- PeMPEA (2,6-dimethoxymescaline)
- 2,6-Dibromomescaline
- 2,6-Dichloromescaline
- DOTMA (Julia; 3,6-dimethyl-DOM)
- Juno (6-methyl-DOM)
- Ganesha (3-methyl-DOM)
- Mescaline-FLY
