= C16H23NO2 =

The molecular formula C_{16}H_{23}NO_{2} (molar mass : 261.36 g/mol) may refer to:

- Bufuralol
- 2C-G-6
- G-5 (drug)
- Ethoheptazine
- Etoxadrol
- Hexylcaine
- Idropranolol
- Isopropylphenidate
- Metheptazine
- 4'-Methoxy-α-pyrrolidinopentiophenone
- Piperocaine
- Prodine (Betaprodine)
- Properidine
- Propylketobemidone
- Propylphenidate
