= 2C-DB =

Clinical data
- Other names: 2-Bromo-2C-B; 2,5-Dimethoxy-4,6-dibromophenethylamine; 2,4-Dibromo-3,6-dimethoxyphenethylamine
- Routes of administration: Oral
- Drug class: Serotonergic psychedelic; Hallucinogen
- ATC code: None

Pharmacokinetic data
- Duration of action: 6–8 hours

Identifiers
- IUPAC name: 2-(2,4-dibromo-3,6-dimethoxyphenyl)ethan-1-amine

Chemical and physical data
- Formula: C_{10}H_{13}Br_{2}NO_{2}
- Molar mass: 339.027 g·mol^{−1}
- 3D model (JSmol): Interactive image
- SMILES: NCCc1c(OC)cc(c(c1Br)OC)Br
- InChI: InChI=1S/C10H13Br2NO2/c1-14-8-5-7(11)10(15-2)9(12)6(8)3-4-13/h5H,3-4,13H2,1-2H3; Key:ISCLQOQPPGRPTK-UHFFFAOYSA-N

2C-DB, also known as 2,5-dimethoxy-4,6-dibromophenethylamine or as 6-bromo-2C-B, is a psychedelic drug of the phenethylamine and 2C families related to 2C-B. It is the 6-bromo derivative of 2C-B and the 4,6-dibromo derivative of 2,5-dimethoxyphenethylamine (2C-H). The drug has a dose range of 20 to 35 mg orally and a duration of 6 to 8 hours. For comparison, 2C-B has a dose of 12 to 24 mg and a duration of 4 to 8 hours. 2C-DB is described as having largely the same effects as 2C-B. However, it is said that the drug may have somewhat greater visual effects than 2C-B. 2C-DB was synthesized and tested by P. Rausch in the 1990s or 2000s. It was described in the scientific literature by Daniel Trachsel in 2013, who cited personal communication with Rausch as the source for the information. The drug is a controlled substance in Canada under phenethylamine blanket-ban language.

== See also ==
- 2C (psychedelics)
- DODB
- DODC
- 2,6-Dibromomescaline
- 2-Bromomescaline
- 2-Bromo-TMA
