= C11H14BrNO2 =

The molecular formula C_{11}H_{14}BrNO_{2} may refer to:

- TCB-2
- ZC-B
- DOB-CR
- 6-Bromo-MDMA
