= 2,6-Dibromomescaline =

Clinical data
- Other names: 2,6-DBM; 2,6-BM; DBM; DBR-M; DBr-M; Dibromomescaline; 2,6-Dibromo-3,4,5-trimethoxyphenethylamine
- Routes of administration: Oral
- Drug class: Serotonin receptor modulator; Serotonergic psychedelic; Hallucinogen
- ATC code: None

Identifiers
- IUPAC name: 2-(2,6-dibromo-3,4,5-trimethoxyphenyl)ethanamine
- PubChem CID: 172872016
- ChemSpider: 138728794

Chemical and physical data
- Formula: C_{11}H_{15}Br_{2}NO_{3}
- Molar mass: 369.053 g·mol^{−1}
- 3D model (JSmol): Interactive image
- SMILES: COC1=C(C(=C(C(=C1OC)Br)CCN)Br)OC
- InChI: InChI=1S/C11H15Br2NO3/c1-15-9-7(12)6(4-5-14)8(13)10(16-2)11(9)17-3/h4-5,14H2,1-3H3; Key:SDKSMIRGLNJZJW-UHFFFAOYSA-N

2,6-Dibromomescaline (2,6-DBM or 2,6-BM), or dibromomescaline (DBM), also known as 2,6-dibromo-3,4,5-trimethoxyphenethylamine, is a psychedelic drug of the scaline family related to mescaline. It is the 2,6-dibromo derivative of mescaline and the 6-bromo derivative of 2-bromomescaline. The drug was first described in the scientific literature by Arthur Heffter in 1901 and is said to have been on the recreational market since at least the 1990s.

== Use and effects ==
2,6-Dibromomescaline is described as having pronounced psychoactive effects but also toxicity, with this toxicity limiting its popularity and adoption as a recreational drug. It is said to have doses of up to 50 mg orally.

== Pharmacology ==
=== Pharmacodynamics ===
2,6-Dibromomescaline shows affinity for serotonin receptors, including the serotonin 5-HT_{1A}, 5-HT_{2A}, and 5-HT_{2C} receptors (K_{i} = 22 nM, 149 nM, and 221 nM, respectively). These affinities were 135-fold, 31-fold, and 35-fold higher than those of mescaline, respectively. It was 3.4-fold more potent than mescaline in substituting for LSD in rodent drug discrimination tests.

== Chemistry ==
=== Synthesis ===
The chemical synthesis of 2,6-dibromomescaline has been described.

=== Analogues ===
Analogues of 2,6-dibromomescaline include 2,6-dichloromescaline, 2,6-dimethylmescaline, 2-bromomescaline, 2-chloromescaline, 2-iodomescaline, and 2-methylmescaline, among others.

== History ==
2,6-Dibromomescaline was first described in the scientific literature by Arthur Heffter in 1901. It was among the first synthetic psychedelic drugs to be described, although Heffter did not report its properties or effects in humans and those were not described until much later. Subsequently, the drug was studied and described in greater detail by Matthew Aaron Parker of the lab of David E. Nichols at Purdue University in 1998. 2,6-Dibromomescaline is said to have been on the recreational market since at least the 1990s.

== Society and culture ==
=== Legal status ===
==== Canada ====
2,6-Dibromomescaline is not a controlled substance in Canada as of 2025.

== See also ==
- Scaline
