= 2-Bromo-4,5-methylenedioxyamphetamine =

Psychoactive drug

6-Bromo-MDA

Clinical data
- Other names: 6-Bromo-MDA; 6-Br-MDA; 6-Bromo-3,4-methylenedioxyamphetamine; 2-Bromo-4,5-methylenedioxyamphetamine; 2-Bromo-4,5-MDA; 2-Br-4,5-MDA
- Routes of administration: Oral
- Drug class: Psychoactive drug; Stimulant
- ATC code: None

Pharmacokinetic data
- Duration of action: Unknown

Identifiers
- IUPAC name: 1-(6-bromo-2H-1,3-benzodioxol-5-yl)propan-2-amine
- CAS Number: 151920-03-5
- PubChem CID: 44719492
- ChemSpider: 23552998
- UNII: N54TW884MR
- CompTox Dashboard (EPA): DTXSID90660354

Chemical and physical data
- Formula: C_{11}H_{17}BrNO_{2}
- Molar mass: 275.166 g·mol^{−1}
- 3D model (JSmol): Interactive image
- SMILES: Brc1cc2c(OCO2)cc1CC(C)N
- InChI: InChI=1S/C10H12BrNO2/c1-6(12)2-7-3-9-10(4-8(7)11)14-5-13-9/h3-4,6H,2,5,12H2,1H3; Key:PHCFFGXVMHXBGD-UHFFFAOYSA-N

6-Bromo-MDA, also known as 6-bromo-3,4-methylenedioxyamphetamine or as 2-bromo-4,5-methylenedioxyamphetamine (2-bromo-4,5-MDA), is a psychoactive drug of the phenethylamine, amphetamine, and MDxx families related to 3,4-methylenedioxyamphetamine (MDA). It is the 6-bromo derivative of MDA. In his book PiHKAL (Phenethylamines I Have Known and Loved), Alexander Shulgin lists 6-bromo-MDA's dose as 350 mg orally and its duration as unknown. 6-Bromo-MDA has been reported to produce amphetamine-like effects with no other details provided. However, Daniel Trachsel reported that 6-bromo-MDA was inactive at doses of up to 350 mg. The chemical synthesis of 6-bromo-MDA has been described. 6-Bromo-MDA was first described in the scientific literature by Silvia Sepaveda and colleagues by 1972. Subsequently, it was described in greater detail by Shulgin in PiHKAL in 1991.

== See also ==
- Substituted methylenedioxyphenethylamine
- 6-Bromo-MDMA
- 6-Chloro-MDMA
- 6-Chloro-MDA
- DFMDA
- 2-Bromomescaline
- 2C-DB
- DODB
