= C14H17NO2 =

The molecular formula C_{14}H_{17}NO_{2} (molar mass : 231.295 g/mol) may refer to:

- Indeloxazine
- 2C-G-N
