= C10H12ClNO2 =

The molecular formula C_{10}H_{12}ClNO_{2} (molar mass: 213.66 g/mol, exact mass: 213.0557 u) may refer to:

- Baclofen
- Chlorpropham (CIPC)
- 6-Chloro-MDA
