= C11H17BrNO2 =

The molecular formula C_{11}H_{17}BrNO_{2} (molar mass: 258.11 g/mol) may refer to:

- 4-Bromo-3,5-dimethoxyamphetamine
- 2-Bromo-4,5-methylenedioxyamphetamine
