= C11H16BrNO3 =

The molecular formula C_{11}H_{16}BrNO_{3} (molar mass: 290.153 g/mol) may refer to:

- 2-Bromomescaline (2-Br-M)
- BOB (psychedelic), or 4-bromo-2,5,beta-trimethoxyphenethylamine
