= 2C-G-5 =

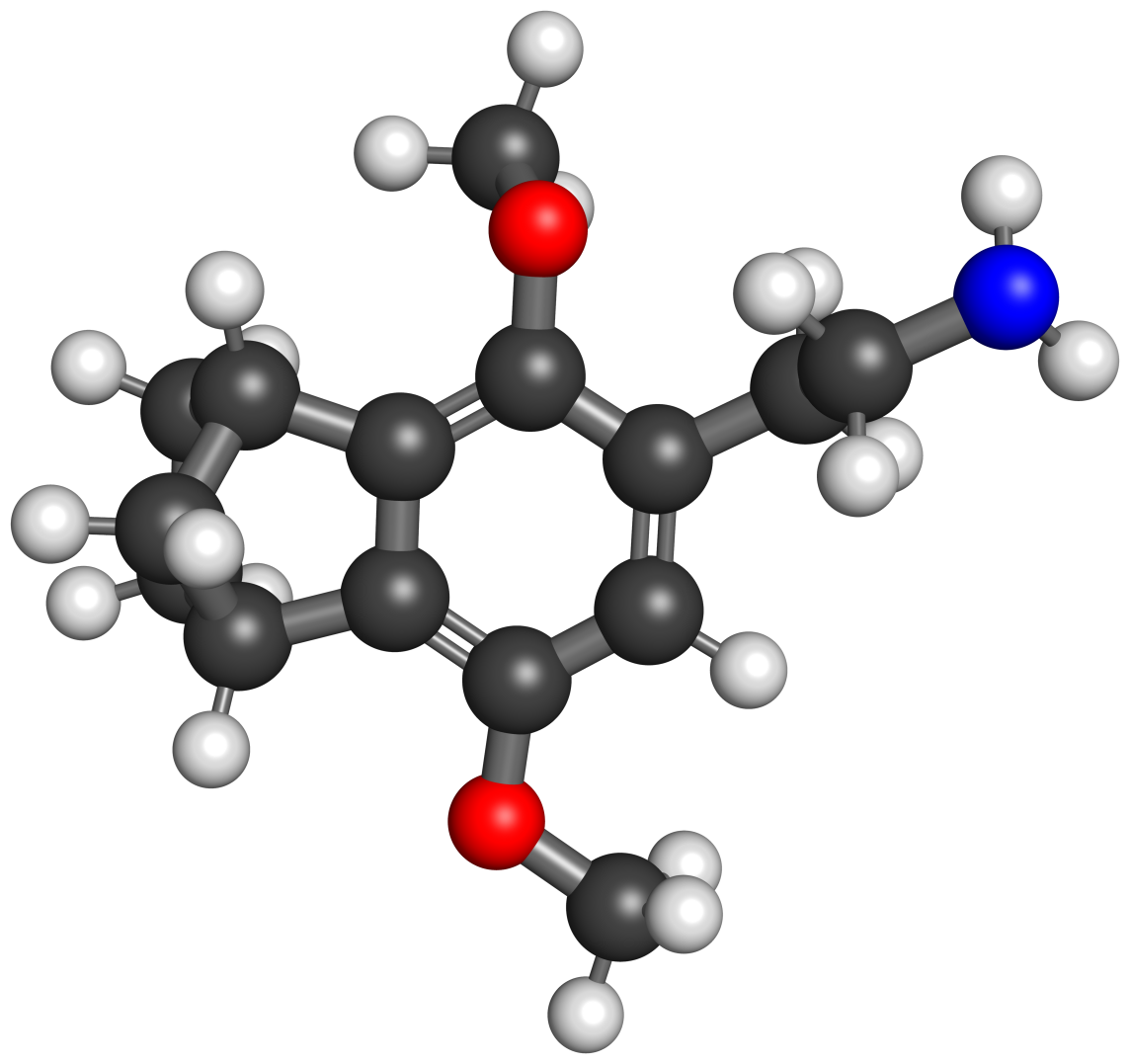

Clinical data
- Other names: 3,4-Norbornyl-2,5-DMPEA; 3,4-Norbornyl-2,5-dimethoxyphenethylamine; 2,5-Dimethoxy-3,4-norbornylphenethylamine; 3,6-Dimethoxy-4-(2-aminoethyl)benzonorbornane
- Routes of administration: Oral
- Drug class: Serotonergic psychedelic; Hallucinogen
- ATC code: None

Pharmacokinetic data
- Onset of action: 1–2 hours
- Duration of action: 32–48 hours

Identifiers
- IUPAC name: 2-(3,6-dimethoxy-4-tricyclo[6.2.1.0^{2,7}]undeca-2,4,6-trienyl)ethanamine
- CAS Number: 207740-20-3
- PubChem CID: 44349968
- ChemSpider: 23206405
- UNII: BW3Q32DFC9
- ChEMBL: ChEMBL123976
- CompTox Dashboard (EPA): DTXSID401016884

Chemical and physical data
- Formula: C_{15}H_{21}NO_{2}
- Molar mass: 247.338 g·mol^{−1}
- 3D model (JSmol): Interactive image
- SMILES: COC1=C2C3CCC(C3)C2=C(C(=C1)CCN)OC
- InChI: InChI=1S/C15H21NO2/c1-17-12-8-11(5-6-16)15(18-2)14-10-4-3-9(7-10)13(12)14/h8-10H,3-7,16H2,1-2H3; Key:ASPWVWSIJQTXDB-UHFFFAOYSA-N

2C-G-5, also known as 3,4-norbornyl-2,5-dimethoxyphenethylamine, is a psychedelic drug of the phenethylamine and 2C families. It is one of several homologues of 2C-G (3,4-dimethyl-2,5-dimethoxyphenethylamine). The drug is taken orally. 2C-G-5 was encountered online as a novel designer drug in 2025.

== Use and effects ==
In his book PiHKAL (Phenethylamines I Have Known and Loved) and other publications, Alexander Shulgin lists 2C-G-5's dose as 10 to 16 mg orally and its duration as 32 to 48 hours. The drug's onset is 1 to 2 hours and its time to peak is 2.5 to 3 hours. 2C-G-5 is reported to produce psychedelic effects including visuals, clear and cosmic thinking, and 2C-B-like enhanced eroticism, among others. It is among the most potent of the 2C psychedelics. However, its duration is described as too long, interfering with sleep and resulting in subsequent-day consequences like tiredness and sleepiness. 2C-G-5 was also the longest-lasting drug included in PiHKAL based on its specified duration.

== Pharmacology ==
Data on the pharmacology and toxicology of 2C-G-5 are unavailable.

== Chemistry ==
=== Synthesis ===
The chemical synthesis of 2C-G-5 has been described.

=== Analogues ===
Analogues of 2C-G-5 include other compounds of the 2C-G and Ganesha series, among others. Examples include 2C-G (2C-G-0), 2C-G-3, 2C-G-4, 2C-G-N, and G-5.

== History ==
2C-G-5 was first described in the literature by Alexander Shulgin in his 1991 book PiHKAL (Phenethylamines I Have Known and Loved). It was encountered online as a novel designer drug in 2025.

== Society and culture ==
=== Legal status ===
==== Canada ====
2C-G-5 is a controlled substance in Canada under phenethylamine blanket-ban language.

==== United States ====
2C-G-5 is not an explicitly controlled substance in the United States. However, it could be considered a controlled substance under the Federal Analogue Act if intended for human consumption.

== See also ==
- 2C (psychedelics)
- 2C-G § Homologues
