= 2-Bromomescaline =

Mescaline derivative drug

Clinical data
- Other names: 2-BM; 2-Br-M; 2-Bromo-3,4,5-trimethoxyphenethylamine
- Drug class: Serotonin receptor modulator; Serotonergic psychedelic; Hallucinogen
- ATC code: None

Identifiers
- IUPAC name: 2-(2-Bromo-3,4,5-trimethoxyphenyl)ethanamine
- CAS Number: 37015-19-3
- PubChem CID: 16637783
- ChemSpider: 17574207
- UNII: A9M89XG7QW
- CompTox Dashboard (EPA): DTXSID301032900

Chemical and physical data
- Formula: C_{11}H_{16}BrNO_{3}
- Molar mass: 290.157 g·mol^{−1}
- 3D model (JSmol): Interactive image
- SMILES: COC1=C(C(=C(C(=C1)CCN)Br)OC)OC
- InChI: InChI=1S/C11H16BrNO3/c1-14-8-6-7(4-5-13)9(12)11(16-3)10(8)15-2/h6H,4-5,13H2,1-3H3; Key:UXQBKANLBLUVMK-UHFFFAOYSA-N

2-Bromomescaline (2-BM or 2-Br-M), also known as 2-bromo-3,4,5-trimethoxyphenethylamine, is a putative psychedelic drug of the scaline family and derivative of the phenethylamine hallucinogen mescaline which has an unusual 2-bromo substitution. It is an agonist for serotonin receptors, with a binding affinity of 215 nM at 5-HT_{1A}, 513 nM at 5-HT_{2A} and 379 nM at 5-HT_{2C}, so while it is around 10 times more tightly binding than mescaline at 5-HT_{1A} and 5-HT_{2A} receptors, it is over 20 times more potent at 5-HT_{2C}. The drug was 5-fold more potent in substituting for LSD than mescaline in rats. It is not known to have been tested in humans. 2-Bromomescaline was first described in the scientific literature, as a chemical intermediate, in 1972. It has been reported as a designer drug, first identified in Austria in January 2023. The drug is not a controlled substance in Canada as of 2025.

== See also ==
- Scaline
- 2,6-Dibromomescaline
- 2-Chloromescaline
- 2-Iodomescaline
- 2-Methylmescaline
- TeMPEA (2-methoxymescaline)
- 2-Bromo-TMA
- 2C-DB
- DODB
- 6-Bromo-MDA
- 6-Chloro-MDMA
- Bromotomscaline
- Bromojimscaline
