= 5-APDI =

Chemical compound

Clinical data
- Other names: 5-APDI; 1-(5-Indanyl)-2-aminopropane; Indanylaminopropane; IAP; Indanametamine; 2-Aminopropylindane; 2-API; Indanylamphetamine
- Routes of administration: Oral
- Drug class: Stimulant; Psychedelic; Serotonin releasing agent
- ATC code: None

Legal status
- Legal status: CA: Schedule III; DE: NpSG (Industrial and scientific use only); UK: Class B

Pharmacokinetic data
- Duration of action: 5–8 hours

Identifiers
- IUPAC name: (±)-1-(2,3-dihydro-1H-inden-5-yl)propan-2-amine
- CAS Number: 13396-94-6
- PubChem CID: 192600
- ChemSpider: 167142
- UNII: 4PH68L63R9
- ChEMBL: ChEMBL6842
- CompTox Dashboard (EPA): DTXSID00896945

Chemical and physical data
- Formula: C_{12}H_{17}N
- Molar mass: 175.275 g·mol^{−1}
- 3D model (JSmol): Interactive image
- Chirality: Racemic mixture
- SMILES: CC(CC1=CC2=C(CCC2)C=C1)N
- InChI: InChI=1S/C12H17N/c1-9(13)7-10-5-6-11-3-2-4-12(11)8-10/h5-6,8-9H,2-4,7,13H2,1H3; Key:QYVNZHBQYJRLEX-UHFFFAOYSA-N

5-(2-Aminopropyl)-2,3-dihydro-1H-indene (5-APDI), also known as indanylaminopropane (IAP), 2-aminopropylindane (2-API), indanametamine, and, incorrectly, as indanylamphetamine, is a stimulant drug of the phenethylamine and amphetamine families related to 3,4-methylenedioxyamphetamine (MDA). It is the analogue of MDA in which the oxygen atoms within the methylenedioxy ring have been replaced with carbon atoms. The drug has been sold by online vendors through the Internet and has been encountered as a designer drug starting in 2003.

== Use and effects ==
According to Alexander Shulgin in his book The Shulgin Index, Volume One: Psychedelic Phenethylamines and Related Compounds, 5-APDI is active at a dose of 40 to 80 mg orally. Its duration and effects were not described. Per Daniel Trachsel in his book Phenethylamine: von der Struktur zur Funktion (Phenethylamines: From Structure to Function), based on anecdotal reports, its dose is 30 to 60 mg orally and its duration is 5 to 8 hours. The effects of 5-APDI are said to be somewhat controversial. It is said to bear only a very slight resemblance to MDMA in terms of its effects and hence does not seem to be an entactogen. The drug is described as a rather distinct substance, reportedly inducing euphoria, amphetamine-like stimulant effects, and, rarely, even psychedelic effects.

== Pharmacology ==
=== Pharmacodynamics ===
5-APDI appears to act as a potent and weakly selective serotonin releasing agent (SSRA) with IC_{50} values of 82 nM, 1,848 nM, and 849 nM for inhibiting the reuptake of serotonin, dopamine, and norepinephrine, respectively.

It fully substitutes for the entactogen MBDB but not the stimulant amphetamine in drug discrimination tests in animals, though it does produce disruption for the latter at high doses.

== Chemistry ==
=== Synthesis ===
The chemical synthesis of 5-APDI has been described.

=== Analogues ===
Derivatives of 5-APDI like the N-methyl, N-ethyl, and α-ethyl analogues could conceivably exist and be active but have not been scientifically investigated. However, the N-methyl derivative 5-MAPDI subsequently emerged as a novel designer drug in the mid-2010s. Some other related compounds include 3,4-methylenedioxyamphetamine (MDA), 5-APDB, 6-APDB, IBF5MAP (5-MAPP), 6-APT (tetralinylaminopropane; TAP), G-3, and 2C-G-3.

The fusion of 5-APDI with 3,3-diphenylpropylamine was reported in a 1968 patent. The dose (of the HCl salt) was judged to be 55mg per tablet (corr. to 50mg of the Fb). The compound had valuable pharmacodynamic properties whilst its toxicity was low. It produces a vasodilatation and thus improves peripheral blood circulation and a pronounced coronary dilatation. The compound further exhibits a blood pressure lowering effect and is therefore indicated for use in the treatment of hypertonia and circulatory illnesses, especially Angina pectoris and other stenocardiac disorders and in the treatment of organic or functional coronary insufficiencies and peripheral blood circulation disorders.

== History ==
5-APDI was first described in the scientific literature by David E. Nichols and colleagues in 1993. The properties of 5-APDI in humans were described by Alexander Shulgin in his book The Shulgin Index, Volume One: Psychedelic Phenethylamines and Related Compounds in 2011, citing personal communication with an individual named Igor. Then, in 2013, its properties and effects were further described by Daniel Trachsel in his book Phenethylamine: von der Struktur zur Funktion (Phenethylamines: From Structure to Function).

== Society and culture ==
=== Legal status ===
==== United Kingdom ====
5-APDI has been classified as a class B drug in the United Kingdom under the Misuse of Drugs Act 1971 since 10 June 2014.

== See also ==
- Substituted amphetamine
- Substituted methylenedioxyphenethylamine § Related compounds
