= DOTMA =

Clinical data
- Other names: 2,5-Dimethoxy-3,4,6-trimethylamphetamine; Julia; 3,6-Dimethyl-DOM; 6-Methyl-Ganesha
- Routes of administration: Oral
- Drug class: Serotonergic psychedelic; Hallucinogen
- ATC code: None

Pharmacokinetic data
- Duration of action: 7–9 hours

Identifiers
- IUPAC name: 1-(2,5-dimethoxy-3,4,6-trimethylphenyl)propan-2-amine

Chemical and physical data
- Formula: C_{14}H_{23}NO_{2}
- Molar mass: 237.343 g·mol^{−1}
- 3D model (JSmol): Interactive image
- SMILES: COc1c(C)c(CC(N)C)c(c(c1C)C)OC
- InChI: InChI=1S/C14H23NO2/c1-8(15)7-12-11(4)13(16-5)9(2)10(3)14(12)17-6/h8H,7,15H2,1-6H3; Key:ROGMRKPRWZWOSW-UHFFFAOYSA-N

DOTMA, also known as 2,5-dimethoxy-3,4,6-trimethylamphetamine or as Julia, is a psychedelic drug of the phenethylamine, amphetamine, and DOx families related to DOM. It is the 3,6-dimethyl derivative of DOM and the 6-methyl derivative of Ganesha. The drug is said to be the first and only known active phenethylamine psychedelic with a fully substituted phenyl ring. However, the cyclized FLY phenethylamines such as 2C-B-FLY also have a fully substituted phenyl ring.

DOTMA's dose is approximately 70 mg orally and its duration is 7 to 9 hours. It is less potent than DOM, which is active at doses of 3 to 10 mg, and has a shorter duration than DOM, which lasts 14 to 20 hours. Similarly, DOTMA is less potent and shorter-acting than Ganesha, which has a dose of 20 to 32 mg and a duration of 18 to 24 hours.

DOTMA was described in the scientific literature by Daniel Trachsel in 2013. The 6-methyl-DOM analogue of DOTMA and Ganesha, Juno, is relatively unknown but may be an active psychedelic as well. DOTMA, or Julia, is closely related to Alexander Shulgin's "ten classic ladies". It is a controlled substance in Canada due to phenethylamine blanket-ban language but is not explicitly controlled in the United States.

== See also ==
- DOx (psychedelics)
- Juno (6-methyl-DOM)
- Ganesha (3-methyl-DOM)
- 2C-G (3-methyl-2C-D)
- PeMA
- TMePEA
- 2,6-Dimethylmescaline
- 2-Methylmescaline
- Xylopropamine (3,4-DMeA)
