= Diphenylpropylamine =

Diphenylpropylamine is a propylamine derivative and may refer to:

- 2,2-Diphenylpropylamine
- 2,3-Diphenylpropylamine
- 3,3-Diphenylpropylamine
