= Milverine (drug) =

Clinical data
- Other names: Fenprin, Fenpyramine, Miospasm

Identifiers
- IUPAC name: N-(3,3-diphenylpropyl)pyridin-4-amine
- CAS Number: 75437-14-8
- PubChem CID: 71139
- ChemSpider: 64284
- UNII: 83B517YUVM
- ChEBI: CHEBI:135196
- ChEMBL: ChEMBL2105255
- CompTox Dashboard (EPA): DTXSID50868359

Chemical and physical data
- Formula: C_{20}H_{20}N_{2}
- Molar mass: 288.394 g·mol^{−1}
- 3D model (JSmol): Interactive image
- SMILES: C1=CC=C(C=C1)C(CCNC2=CC=NC=C2)C3=CC=CC=C3
- InChI: InChI=1S/C20H20N2/c1-3-7-17(8-4-1)20(18-9-5-2-6-10-18)13-16-22-19-11-14-21-15-12-19/h1-12,14-15,20H,13,16H2,(H,21,22); Key:KMZHYAUKFHLFNY-UHFFFAOYSA-N

Milverine (Fenprin, Fenpyramine, Miospasm) is a spasmolytic (antispasmodic) agent that was developed in the latter half of the 20th century.

The therapeutic use of fenpyramin as a platelet-antiaggregating and antithrombotic as well as vasodilating and antianginous medicine was also identified.

Milverine is a bifunctional molecule; one half of the molecule contains 3,3-Diphenylpropylamine and the other half of the molecule contains fampridine.

== Synthesis ==
The chemical synthesis of milverine was identified.

Milverine synthesis

Conjugate soft addition of benzene to cinnamic acid [140-10-3] (1) gives 3,3-diphenylpropionic acid [606-83-7] (2). Halogenation with thionyl chloride gives 3,3-diphenylpropionyl chloride [37089-77-3] (3). Schotten-Baumann reaction with 4-aminopyridine (Fampridine) [504-24-5] (4) gives 3,3-diphenyl-N-(4-pyridyl)propionamide [75437-13-7] (5). The last step involves reduction of the amide bond giving milverine (6), respectively.
