= 2-Bromo-TMA =

Clinical data
- Other names: 2-Br-TMA; 2-Bromo-3,4,5-trimethoxyamphetamine; BTMA
- Routes of administration: Oral
- Drug class: Serotonergic psychedelic; Hallucinogen
- ATC code: None

Pharmacokinetic data
- Duration of action: 8 hours

Identifiers
- IUPAC name: 1-(2-bromo-3,4,5-trimethoxyphenyl)propan-2-amine

Chemical and physical data
- Formula: C_{12}H_{18}BrNO_{3}
- Molar mass: 304.184 g·mol^{−1}
- 3D model (JSmol): Interactive image
- SMILES: COc1cc(CC(N)C)c(c(c1OC)OC)Br
- InChI: InChI=1S/C12H18BrNO3/c1-7(14)5-8-6-9(15-2)11(16-3)12(17-4)10(8)13/h6-7H,5,14H2,1-4H3; Key:XQNPOMXGYULEPE-UHFFFAOYSA-N

2-Bromo-TMA, or 2-Br-TMA, also known as 2-bromo-3,4,5-trimethoxyamphetamine, is a psychedelic drug of the phenethylamine, amphetamine, and 3C families related to 3,4,5-trimethoxyamphetamine (TMA). It is the 2-brominated derivative of TMA. The drug's dose is approximately 200 mg orally and its duration is approximately 8 hours. Compared to TMA, 2-bromo-TMA is described as being only slightly less potent, being more active in altering visual perception, and having fewer physical side effects in comparison. 2-Bromo-TMA was described in the scientific literature by Daniel Trachsel and colleagues in 2013, who cited personal communication with P. Rausch in 2009 for the information. It is a controlled substance in Canada as an analogue of Amphetamine.

== See also ==
- 3C (psychedelics)
- 2-Bromomescaline
- DODB
- 2C-DB
- Bromotomscaline
- Bromojimscaline
- TeMA (2-methoxy-TMA)
- Methyl-TMA
