= DODC =

Chemical compound

Identifiers
- IUPAC name: 1-(2,5-dimethoxy-3,4-dichlorophenyl)propan-2-amine
- CAS Number: 1373918-65-0
- PubChem CID: 168429515
- ChemSpider: 129432165
- UNII: JW779U7A4H

Chemical and physical data
- Formula: C_{11}H_{15}Cl_{2}NO_{2}
- Molar mass: 264.15 g·mol^{−1}
- 3D model (JSmol): Interactive image
- SMILES: Clc1c(OC)cc(CC(C)N)c(OC)c1Cl
- InChI: InChI=1S/C11H15Cl2NO2/c1-6(14)4-7-5-8(15-2)9(12)10(13)11(7)16-3/h5-6H,4,14H2,1-3H3; Key:IGOFLAWWDQNRCV-UHFFFAOYSA-N

DODC is a psychedelic drug from the substituted amphetamine family which acts as an agonist of the 5-HT_{2A} receptor. It is the 3,4-dichloro derivative of the well known psychedelic drug 2,5-dimethoxy-4-chloroamphetamine (DOC). DODC was first officially published in a patent filed by Gilgamesh Pharmaceuticals in 2020, though anecdotal reports suggest it had been synthesised by clandestine chemists and its activity established several years prior to this.

== See also ==
- DOx
- Ganesha (psychedelic)
- DMMDA
- 2,3,4,5-Tetramethoxyamphetamine
- 3,4-Difluoroamphetamine
- CT-5172
- DODB
- 2,6-Dichloromescaline
