= G-4 (drug) =

Clinical data
- Other names: G4; Ganesha-4; GANESHA-4; 3C-G-4; 3,4-Tetramethylene-2,5-dimethoxyamphetamine; 2,5-Dimethoxy-3,4-(tetramethylene)amphetamine; 6-(2-Aminopropyl)-5,8-dimethoxytetralin; DOG-4
- Routes of administration: Unknown
- ATC code: None

Pharmacokinetic data
- Duration of action: Unknown

Identifiers
- IUPAC name: 1-(1,4-dimethoxy-5,6,7,8-tetrahydronaphthalen-2-yl)propan-2-amine
- PubChem CID: 57465383
- ChemSpider: 76392985

Chemical and physical data
- Formula: C_{15}H_{23}NO_{2}
- Molar mass: 249.354 g·mol^{−1}
- 3D model (JSmol): Interactive image
- SMILES: CC(CC1=CC(=C2CCCCC2=C1OC)OC)N
- InChI: InChI=1S/C15H23NO2/c1-10(16)8-11-9-14(17-2)12-6-4-5-7-13(12)15(11)18-3/h9-10H,4-8,16H2,1-3H3; Key:SEIUSMPGGATKFD-UHFFFAOYSA-N

G-4, also known as 3,4-tetramethylene-2,5-dimethoxyamphetamine or as 6-(2-aminopropyl)-5,8-dimethoxytetralin, is a chemical compound of the phenethylamine, amphetamine, and DOx families. It is one of several homologues of Ganesha (G).

In his book PiHKAL (Phenethylamines I Have Known and Loved) and other publications, Alexander Shulgin lists G-4's dose as unknown and its duration as unknown. He was unable to complete the last step of its chemical synthesis and did not test it or determine its properties and effects. The chemical synthesis of G-4 has been described.

G-4 was first described in the literature by Shulgin in PiHKAL in 1991. It is a controlled substance in Canada under phenethylamine blanket-ban language.

== See also ==
- Ganesha (psychedelics)
- DOx (psychedelics)
- 2C-G-4
- 6-APT (TAP)
