= Ganesha (psychedelic) =

Psychedelic drug

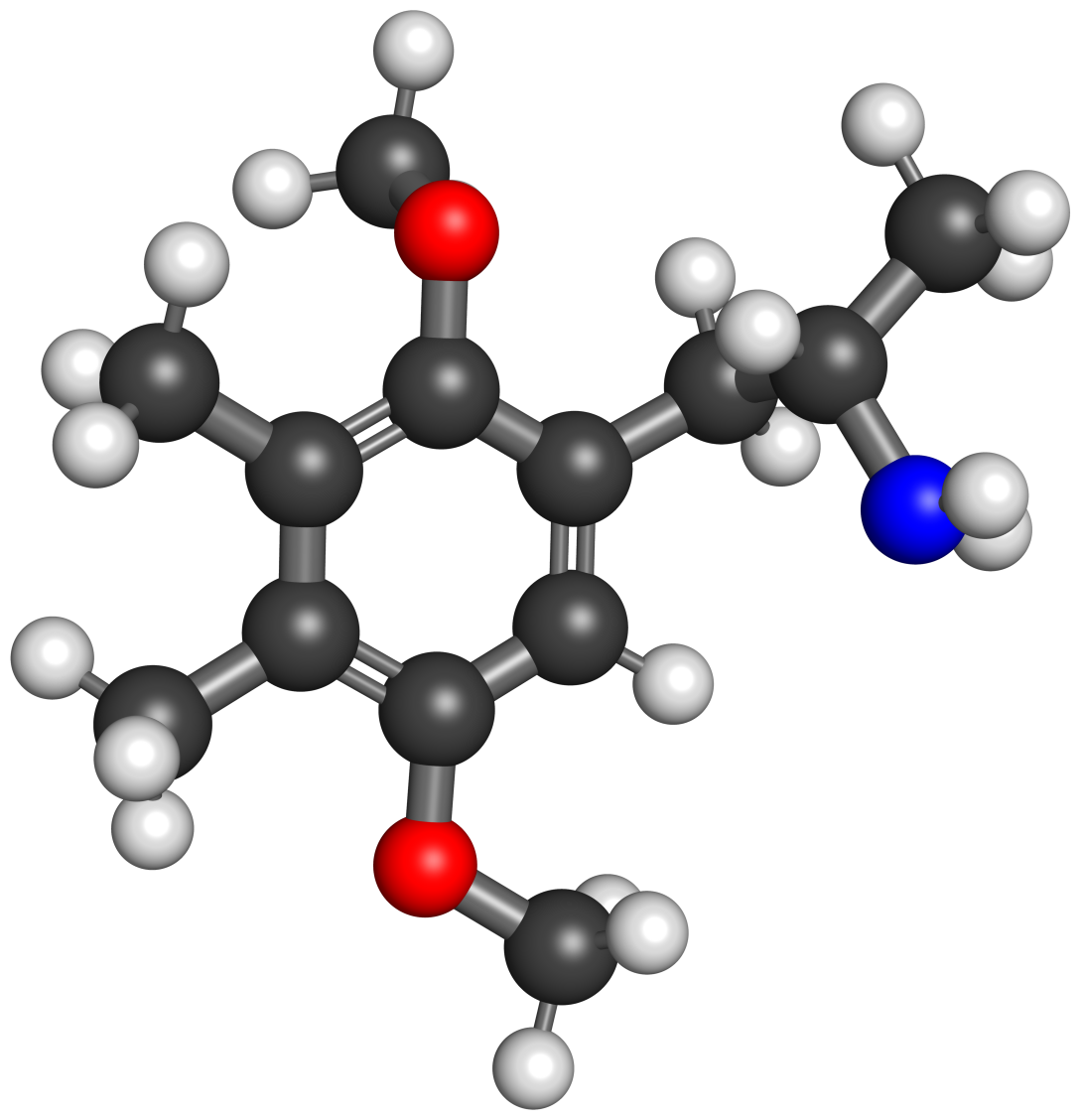

Clinical data
- Other names: GANESHA; G; G-0; 3C-G; 3,4-Dimethyl-2,5-dimethoxyamphetamine; 2,5-Dimethoxy-3,4-dimethylamphetamine; 3-Methyl-DOM; 3-Me-DOM; DOG; DOG-0
- Routes of administration: Oral
- Drug class: Serotonergic psychedelic; Hallucinogen
- ATC code: None

Pharmacokinetic data
- Onset of action: Slow over 3 hours or rapid
- Duration of action: 18–24 hours

Identifiers
- IUPAC name: 1-(2,5-dimethoxy-3,4-dimethylphenyl)propan-2-amine
- CAS Number: 207740-37-2
- PubChem CID: 44350044
- ChemSpider: 21106315
- UNII: 255K39NLR7
- ChEMBL: ChEMBL339431
- CompTox Dashboard (EPA): DTXSID10658374

Chemical and physical data
- Formula: C_{13}H_{21}NO_{2}
- Molar mass: 223.316 g·mol^{−1}
- 3D model (JSmol): Interactive image
- SMILES: COc1c(C)c(C)c(cc1CC(C)N)OC
- InChI: InChI=1S/C13H21NO2/c1-8(14)6-11-7-12(15-4)9(2)10(3)13(11)16-5/h7-8H,6,14H2,1-5H3; Key:RBZXVDSILZXPDM-UHFFFAOYSA-N

Ganesha (G or G-0), also known as 3,4-dimethyl-2,5-dimethoxyamphetamine or as 3-methyl-DOM, is a psychedelic drug of the phenethylamine, amphetamine, and DOx families. It is the 3-methyl derivative of DOM and the amphetamine (α-methyl) derivative of 2C-G. The drug is taken orally.

== Use and effects ==
In his book PiHKAL (Phenethylamines I Have Known and Loved), Alexander Shulgin lists Ganesha's dose range as 24 to 32 mg orally and its duration as 18 to 24 hours. The drug's onset was variably described as slow over the course of 3 hours or as rapid. The effects of Ganesha have been reported to include strong closed-eye visuals, an increased appreciation of music, and powerful relaxation and tranquility, among others. Shulgin named Ganesha after the Hindu deity, Ganesha. It is one of his "ten classic ladies", a series of methylated DOM derivatives.

== Chemistry ==
=== Synthesis ===
The chemical synthesis of Ganesha has been described.

=== Homologues ===
Homologues of Ganesha (G-0) include G-3, G-4, G-5, and G-N, among others.

| Compound | Details | Structure |
|---|---|---|
| G-3 | CAS #: 207740-36-1 Dose: 12–18 mg Duration: 8–12 hours Effects: Closed-eye imagery, no visuals, fantasy, no body load, neurological sensitivity, others 2C analogue: 2C-G-3 | |
| G-4 | CAS #: Unknown Partially synthesized but not tested. 2C analogue: 2C-G-4 | |
| G-5 | CAS #: 133787-68-5 Dose: 14–20 mg Duration: 16–30 hours Effects: No visuals or other sensory effects, excellent mental activity, mental integration, lacking something important, little or no body load 2C analogue: 2C-G-5 | |
| G-N | CAS #: 477904-62-4 Synthesized and tested at 2 mg but not up to active levels 2C analogue: 2C-G-N | |
| G-O | CAS #: 774538-38-4 Described and/or synthesized but not tested 2C analogue: None | |

== History ==
Ganesha was first described in the literature by Alexander Shulgin in his book PiHKAL (Phenethylamines I Have Known and Loved) in 1991.

== Society and culture ==
=== Legal status ===
==== Canada ====
Ganesha is a controlled substance in Canada under phenethylamine blanket-ban language.

==== United Kingdom ====
This substance is a Class A drug in the Drugs controlled by the UK Misuse of Drugs Act.

==== United States ====
Ganesha is not an explicitly controlled substance in the United States. However, it could be considered a controlled substance under the Federal Analogue Act if intended for human consumption. In addition, the drug may considered a controlled substance as a positional isomer of DOET.

== See also ==
- DOx (psychedelics)
- Juno (6-methyl-DOM)
- DOTMA (3,6-dimethyl-DOM)
- DODC (3-chloro-DOC)
- DODB (6-bromo-DOB)
- 2-Methylmescaline
