= 6-Bromo-MDMA =

Clinical data
- Other names: 6-Br-MDMA; 6Br-MDMA; 6-Bromo-3,4-methylenedioxy-N-methylamphetamine; 2-Br-4,5-MDMA
- Drug class: Psychoactive drug; Serotonin reuptake inhibitor
- ATC code: None

Identifiers
- IUPAC name: 1-(6-bromo-1,3-benzodioxol-5-yl)-N-methylpropan-2-amine
- CAS Number: 2170110-34-4
- PubChem CID: 132988792
- UNII: ZB2C33UXM7

Chemical and physical data
- Formula: C_{11}H_{14}BrNO_{2}
- Molar mass: 272.142 g·mol^{−1}
- 3D model (JSmol): Interactive image
- SMILES: CC(CC1=CC2=C(C=C1Br)OCO2)NC
- InChI: InChI=1S/C11H14BrNO2/c1-7(13-2)3-8-4-10-11(5-9(8)12)15-6-14-10/h4-5,7,13H,3,6H2,1-2H3; Key:ZIBHSZQEEWBQLW-UHFFFAOYSA-N

6-Bromo-MDMA, also known as 6-bromo-3,4-methylenedioxy-N-methylamphetamine or as 2-bromo-4,5-methylenedioxymethamphetamine (2-Br-4,5-MDMA), is a psychoactive drug of the phenethylamine, amphetamine, and MDxx families related to MDMA. It does not appear to be a serotonin releasing agent like MDMA, but instead to be a serotonin reuptake inhibitor like citalopram, and with much greater serotonin transporter (SERT) affinity than MDMA. Relatedly, 6-bromo-MDMA lacked key MDMA-like behavioral effects in rodents, including hyperlocomotion, enhanced active avoidance conditioning, and increased social interaction. The drug was encountered as a novel designer drug in Europe in 2014.

== See also ==
- Substituted methylenedioxyphenethylamine
- 6-Bromo-MDA
- 6-Chloro-MDMA
- 6-Chloro-MDA
- DFMDA
