= 3,3-Diphenylpropylamine =

Names
- Preferred IUPAC name 3,3-Diphenylpropan-1-amine

Identifiers
CAS Number	5586-73-2
3D model (JSmol)	Interactive image
ChEMBL	ChEMBL609579
ChemSpider	71998
ECHA InfoCard	100.024.532
PubChem CID	79698
UNII	C31E561S64
CompTox Dashboard (EPA)	DTXSID30204458
- InChI: InChI=1S/C15H17N/c16-12-11-15(13-7-3-1-4-8-13)14-9-5-2-6-10-14/h1-10,15H,11-12,16H2 Key: KISZTEOELCMZPY-UHFFFAOYSA-N
- SMILES: C1=CC=C(C=C1)C(CCN)C2=CC=CC=C2

Properties
Chemical formula	C_{15}H_{17}N
Molar mass	211.308 g·mol^{−1}
- Except where otherwise noted, data are given for materials in their standard state (at 25 °C [77 °F], 100 kPa). verify (what is ?) Infobox references

3,3-Diphenylpropylamine is a form of diphenylpropylamine.

It is commonly conjugated to another agent giving a "bifunctional" molecule. Some such agents are used to treat cardiovascular diseases.

3,3-Diphenylpropylamine derivatives
Name	Identifier	Chemical structure
BIIA 0388	CID:9958467 [337359-07-6]	
BZP derivative		
Droprenilamine	[57653-27-7]	
Delucemine	[186495-49-8 ]	
Fendiline	[13042-18-7]	
Lercanidipine	[100427-26-7]	
KD-983	[50597-65-4]	
Mepramidil	[23891-60-3]	
Milverine	[75437-14-8]	
PF 244	Fb: [52017-07-9]	
Prenylamine	[390-64-7]	
SoRI-20041	now SRI-20041	
Tiopropamine	[39516-21-7]	
CB1 receptor ligand	[117-34-0] [5586-73-2]	
5-APDI		
SRI-29213	PC121377378	
