= 2,2-Diphenylpropylamine =

Names
- Preferred IUPAC name 2,2-Diphenylpropan-1-amine

Identifiers
CAS Number	34611-07-9
3D model (JSmol)	Interactive image
ChemSpider	465217
PubChem CID	533958
UNII	744DNN178I
CompTox Dashboard (EPA)	DTXSID201029657
- InChI: InChI=1S/C15H17N/c1-15(12-16,13-8-4-2-5-9-13)14-10-6-3-7-11-14/h2-11H,12,16H2,1H3 Key: CDUYAMDJQXHINM-UHFFFAOYSA-N
- SMILES: CC(CN)(C1=CC=CC=C1)C2=CC=CC=C2

Properties
Chemical formula	C_{15}H_{17}N
Molar mass	211.308 g·mol^{−1}
- Except where otherwise noted, data are given for materials in their standard state (at 25 °C [77 °F], 100 kPa). verify (what is ?) Infobox references

2,2-Diphenylpropylamine is a form of diphenylpropylamine.
