= 6-Chloro-MDMA =

MDMA derivative drug

Clinical data
- Other names: 6-Cl-MDMA; 6-Chloro-3,4-methylenedioxy-N-methylamphetamine; 2-Cl-4,5-MDMA; 2-Chloro-4,5-methylenedioxy-N-methylamphetamine
- ATC code: None

Legal status
- Legal status: CA: Schedule III; DE: Anlage I (Authorized scientific use only); UK: Class A

Identifiers
- IUPAC name: 1-(6-chloro-1,3-benzodioxol-5-yl)-N-methylpropan-2-amine
- CAS Number: 319920-71-3
- PubChem CID: 60209987
- ChemSpider: 59718634
- UNII: 6G65JU3BBZ
- CompTox Dashboard (EPA): DTXSID801032898

Chemical and physical data
- Formula: C_{11}H_{14}ClNO_{2}
- Molar mass: 227.69 g·mol^{−1}
- 3D model (JSmol): Interactive image
- SMILES: CNC(C)Cc2cc1OCOc1cc2Cl
- InChI: InChI=1S/C11H14ClNO2/c1-7(13-2)3-8-4-10-11(5-9(8)12)15-6-14-10/h4-5,7,13H,3,6H2,1-2H3; Key:UUGIOXDVHPQROZ-UHFFFAOYSA-N

6-Chloro-MDMA, also known as 6-chloro-3,4-methylenedioxy-N-methylamphetamine or as 2-chloro-4,5-methylenedioxy-N-methylamphetamine (2-Cl-4,5-MDMA), is a chemical compound of the phenethylamine, amphetamine, and MDxx families related to MDMA. It is the 6-chloro derivative of MDMA. The drug has been identified both in seized "ecstasy" tablets and in urine samples from drug users. It is thought most likely to be an impurity from synthesis and its pharmacological properties have not been established; however, it has been banned in several countries.

== Society and culture ==
=== Legal status ===
6-Chloro-MDMA is illegal in the United Kingdom, Germany (Anlage I), and China.

== See also ==
- Substituted methylenedioxyphenethylamine
- 6-Chloro-MDA
- 6-Bromo-MDMA
- 6-Bromo-MDA
- DFMDA
- 2-Chloromescaline
