= 2-Chloromescaline =

Clinical data
- Other names: 2-CM; 2-Cl-M; 2-Chloro-3,4,5-trimethoxyphenethylamine
- Drug class: Serotonin receptor modulator
- ATC code: None

Identifiers
- IUPAC name: 2-(2-chloro-3,4,5-trimethoxyphenyl)ethan-1-amine

Chemical and physical data
- Formula: C_{11}H_{16}ClNO_{3}
- Molar mass: 245.70 g·mol^{−1}
- 3D model (JSmol): Interactive image
- SMILES: NCCc1cc(OC)c(c(c1Cl)OC)OC
- InChI: InChI=1S/C11H16ClNO3/c1-14-8-6-7(4-5-13)9(12)11(16-3)10(8)15-2/h6H,4-5,13H2,1-3H3; Key:LNEOIKLZQLPCLZ-UHFFFAOYSA-N

2-Chloromescaline (2-CM or 2-Cl-M), also known as 2-chloro-3,4,5-trimethoxyphenethylamine, is a serotonin receptor modulator of the scaline family related to mescaline. It has been encountered as an artifact in the isolation of mescaline from the Trichocereus peruvianus (San Pedro/Peruvian torch) cactus with a chlorinated solvent.

== Pharmacology ==
=== Pharmacodynamics ===
The drug shows affinity for serotonin receptors, including the serotonin 5-HT_{1A}, 5-HT_{2A}, and 5-HT_{2C} receptors (K_{i} = 465 nM, 826 nM, and 726 nM, respectively). Its affinities for these receptors were 6.4-fold, 5.5-fold, and 10.7-fold higher than those of mescaline, respectively. The drug is not known to have been tested in animals or humans.

== History ==
2-Chloromescaline was first described in the scientific literature by J. H. Pardanani and colleagues in 1977. It was described in greater detail by Daniel Trachsel and colleagues in 2013, who cited personal communication with David E. Nichols as the source for its serotonin receptor affinities.

== Society and culture ==
=== Legal status ===
==== Canada ====
2-Chloromescaline is not a controlled substance in Canada as of 2025.

== See also ==
- Scaline
- 2,6-Dichloromescaline
- 2-Bromomescaline
- 2-Iodomescaline
- 2-Methylmescaline
- TeMPEA (2-methoxymescaline)
- 6-Chloro-MDMA
