= Juno (psychedelic) =

Clinical data
- Other names: JUNO; 3,6-Dimethoxy-2,4-dimethylamphetamine; 4,6-Dimethyl-2,5-dimethoxyamphetamine; 6-Methyl-DOM; 6-Me-DOM
- Routes of administration: Unknown
- Drug class: Serotonergic psychedelic; Hallucinogen
- ATC code: None

Pharmacokinetic data
- Duration of action: Unknown

Identifiers
- IUPAC name: 1-(3,6-dimethoxy-2,4-dimethylphenyl)propan-2-amine

Chemical and physical data
- Formula: C_{13}H_{21}NO_{2}
- Molar mass: 223.316 g·mol^{−1}
- 3D model (JSmol): Interactive image
- SMILES: COc1c(C)cc(c(c1C)CC(N)C)OC
- InChI: InChI=1S/C13H21NO2/c1-8-6-12(15-4)11(7-9(2)14)10(3)13(8)16-5/h6,9H,7,14H2,1-5H3; Key:GNNNCQKNVSPUBX-UHFFFAOYSA-N

Juno, also known as 4,6-dimethyl-2,5-dimethoxyamphetamine or as 6-methyl-DOM, is a possible psychedelic drug of the phenethylamine, amphetamine, and DOx families related to DOM. It is the 6-methyl derivative of DOM and a positional isomer of Ganesha (3-methyl-DOM). The drug is one of Alexander Shulgin's "ten classic ladies", a series of methylated DOM derivatives. DOM, Ganesha, and DOTMA (Julia; 3,6-dimethyl-DOM) are all known to be active psychedelics, so Juno is expected to be an active psychedelic as well, but has not yet been tested. Juno was first described by Shulgin in his 1991 book PiHKAL (Phenethylamines I Have Known and Loved). He shared in PiHKAL that he had had Juno on a shelf in his lab for almost 14 years but had never gotten around to trying it. It is a controlled substance in Canada under phenethylamine blanket-ban language. The drug is not an explicitly controlled substance in the United States, but may be considered scheduled as an isomer of DOET.

== See also ==
- DOx (psychedelics)
- Ganesha (3-methyl-DOM)
- DOTMA (Julia; 3,6-dimethyl-DOM)
- 2-Methylmescaline
