= 2-Methylmescaline =

Clinical data
- Other names: 2-Me-M; 2-Methyl-3,4,5-trimethoxyphenethylamine; 3,4,5-Trimethoxy-2-methylphenethylamine
- Drug class: Serotonin receptor modulator
- ATC code: None

Identifiers
- IUPAC name: 2-(3,4,5-trimethoxy-2-methylphenyl)ethanamine
- PubChem CID: 154346781

Chemical and physical data
- Formula: C_{12}H_{19}NO_{3}
- Molar mass: 225.288 g·mol^{−1}
- 3D model (JSmol): Interactive image
- SMILES: CC1=C(C(=C(C=C1CCN)OC)OC)OC
- InChI: InChI=1S/C12H19NO3/c1-8-9(5-6-13)7-10(14-2)12(16-4)11(8)15-3/h7H,5-6,13H2,1-4H3; Key:PCULFTFEHMIRBM-UHFFFAOYSA-N

2-Methylmescaline (2-Me-M), also known as 2-methyl-3,4,5-trimethoxyphenethylamine, is a serotonin receptor modulator of the phenethylamine and scaline families related to mescaline. It is the 2-methyl derivative of mescaline. The drug shows affinity for the serotonin 5-HT_{1A}, 5-HT_{2A}, and 5-HT_{2C} receptors (K_{i} = 525 nM, 1,640 nM, and 1,094 nM, respectively). These affinities were 5.7-fold, 2.8-fold, and 7.1-fold higher than those of mescaline, respectively. The drug is not known to have been tested in animals or humans. 2-Methylmescaline was first described in the scientific literature by Daniel Trachsel and colleagues in 2013. The source of the information cited by Trachsel and colleagues was personal communication with David E. Nichols in 2010. It is not a controlled substance in Canada as of 2025.

== See also ==
- Scaline
- TeMPEA (2-methoxymescaline)
- 2-Bromomescaline
- 2-Chloromescaline
- 2-Iodomescaline
- Juno (6-methyl-DOM)
- DOTMA (Julia; 3,6-dimethyl-DOM)
- Ganesha (3-methyl-DOM)
