= DODB =

Clinical data
- Other names: 6-Bromo-DOB; 2,5-Dimethoxy-4,6-dibromoamphetamine; 2,4-Dibromo-3,6-dimethoxyamphetamine
- Routes of administration: Oral
- Drug class: Serotonergic psychedelic; Hallucinogen
- ATC code: None

Pharmacokinetic data
- Duration of action: 12–20 hours

Identifiers
- IUPAC name: 1-(2,4-dibromo-3,6-dimethoxyphenyl)propan-2-amine

Chemical and physical data
- Formula: C_{11}H_{15}Br_{2}NO_{2}
- Molar mass: 353.054 g·mol^{−1}
- 3D model (JSmol): Interactive image
- SMILES: COc1c(Br)cc(c(c1Br)CC(N)C)OC
- InChI: InChI=1S/C11H15Br2NO2/c1-6(14)4-7-9(15-2)5-8(12)11(16-3)10(7)13/h5-6H,4,14H2,1-3H3; Key:MFEJTCMFVXAELO-UHFFFAOYSA-N

DODB, also known as 2,5-dimethoxy-4,6-dibromoamphetamine or as 6-bromo-DOB, is a psychedelic drug of the phenethylamine, amphetamine, and DOx families related to DOB. It is the 6-bromo derivative of DOB and the 4,6-dibromo derivative of 2,5-dimethoxyamphetamine (2,5-DMA; DOH). The drug has a dose range of 5 to 8 mg orally and a duration of 12 to 20 hours. For comparison, DOB has a dose of 1 to 3 mg and a duration of 18 to 30 hours. DODB is described as having largely the same effects as DOB. However, it is said that the drug may have somewhat greater visual effects than DOB and that its physical side effects appear to be less pronounced than those of DOB. DODB was synthesized and tested by P. Rausch in the 1990s or 2000s. It was described in the scientific literature by Daniel Trachsel in 2013, who cited personal communication with Rausch as the source for the information. The drug is a controlled substance in Canada under phenethylamine blanket-ban language.

== See also ==
- DOx (psychedelics)
- 2C-DB
- DODC
- 2,6-Dibromomescaline
- 2-Bromomescaline
- 2-Bromo-TMA
