= G-3 (drug) =

Clinical data
- Other names: G3; Ganesha-3; GANESHA-3; 3C-G-3; 3,4-Trimethylene-2,5-dimethoxyamphetamine; 2,5-Dimethoxy-3,4-(trimethylene)amphetamine; DOG-3
- Routes of administration: Oral
- Drug class: Serotonergic psychedelic; Hallucinogen
- ATC code: None

Pharmacokinetic data
- Duration of action: 8–12 hours

Identifiers
- IUPAC name: 1-(4,7-dimethoxy-2,3-dihydro-1H-inden-5-yl)propan-2-amine
- CAS Number: 207740-36-1
- PubChem CID: 44350047
- ChemSpider: 23206457
- ChEMBL: ChEMBL124570

Chemical and physical data
- Formula: C_{14}H_{21}NO_{2}
- Molar mass: 235.327 g·mol^{−1}
- 3D model (JSmol): Interactive image
- SMILES: CC(CC1=CC(=C2CCCC2=C1OC)OC)N
- InChI: InChI=1S/C14H21NO2/c1-9(15)7-10-8-13(16-2)11-5-4-6-12(11)14(10)17-3/h8-9H,4-7,15H2,1-3H3; Key:GLFZOKOHBIKEKN-UHFFFAOYSA-N

G-3, also known as 3,4-trimethylene-2,5-dimethoxyamphetamine, is a psychedelic drug of the phenethylamine, amphetamine, and DOx families. It is one of several homologues of Ganesha (G).

== Use and effects ==
In his book PiHKAL (Phenethylamines I Have Known and Loved) and other publications, Alexander Shulgin lists G-3's dose as 12 to 18 mg orally and its duration as 8 to 12 hours. The effects of G-3 were reported to include closed-eye imagery, no visuals, fantasy, warmth, mellowness, no body disturbance to hints of body discomfort, and "some suggestions of neurological sensitivity". Music was described as not that exciting and it was felt that there could be easy eroticism but there was no push for it. The drug was rated a "plus-three" on the Shulgin Rating Scale despite there "not [being] much of anything" in one report.

== Chemistry ==
=== Synthesis ===
The chemical synthesis of G-3 has been described.

== History ==
G-3 was first described in the literature by Alexander Shulgin in his book PiHKAL (Phenethylamines I Have Known and Loved) in 1991.

== Society and culture ==
=== Legal status ===
G-3 is a controlled substance in Canada under phenethylamine blanket-ban language.

== See also ==
- Ganesha (psychedelics)
- DOx (psychedelics)
- 2C-G-3
- 5-APDI (IAP)
- DMMDA
