= 2,6-Dichloromescaline =

Clinical data
- Other names: 2,6-CM; Dichloromescaline; DCL-M; DCl-M; 2,6-Dichloro-3,4,5-trimethoxyphenethylamine
- Drug class: Serotonin receptor modulator; Serotonergic psychedelic; Hallucinogen
- ATC code: None

Identifiers
- IUPAC name: 2-(2,6-dichloro-3,4,5-trimethoxyphenyl)ethan-1-amine

Chemical and physical data
- Formula: C_{11}H_{15}Cl_{2}NO_{3}
- Molar mass: 280.15 g·mol^{−1}
- 3D model (JSmol): Interactive image
- SMILES: NCCc1c(Cl)c(OC)c(c(c1Cl)OC)OC
- InChI: InChI=1S/C11H15Cl2NO3/c1-15-9-7(12)6(4-5-14)8(13)10(16-2)11(9)17-3/h4-5,14H2,1-3H3; Key:KXHHCBHONMZNGQ-UHFFFAOYSA-N

2,6-Dichloromescaline (2,6-CM), or dichloromescaline (DCL-M, DCM), also known as 2,6-dichloro-3,4,5-trimethoxyphenethylamine, is a psychedelic drug of the scaline family related to mescaline. It is the 2,6-dichloro derivative of mescaline and the 6-chloro derivative of 2-chloromescaline.

== Pharmacology ==
=== Pharmacodynamics ===
The drug shows affinity for serotonin receptors, including the serotonin 5-HT_{1A}, 5-HT_{2A}, and 5-HT_{2C} receptors (K_{i} = 86 nM, 659 nM, and 801 nM, respectively). These affinities were 35-fold, 7-fold, and 10-fold higher than those of mescaline, respectively.

== History ==
2,6-Dichloromescaline was first described in the scientific literature by 1977. Its serotonin receptor affinities were determined by David E. Nichols and colleagues, with subsequent disclosure by Daniel Trachsel and colleagues via personal communication in 2013. 2,6-Dichloromescaline has been encountered as a novel designer drug and is said to have been on the recreational market since at least the 1990s. Relatedly, the properties and effects of 2,6-dichloromescaline in humans were described in The Entheogen Review in 1997, claiming a dose of approximately 10 mg orally to be robustly active. However, a subsequent investigation concluded that this report was fabricated.

== Society and culture ==
=== Legal status ===
==== Canada ====
2,6-Dichloromescaline is not a controlled substance in Canada as of 2025.

== See also ==
- Scaline
- 2-Chloromescaline
- 2,6-Dibromomescaline
- 2,6-Dimethylmescaline
