= 2,3-Diphenylpropylamine =

Names
- Preferred IUPAC name 2,3-Diphenylpropan-1-amine

Identifiers
CAS Number	5415-80-5
3D model (JSmol)	Interactive image
ChemSpider	35395
ECHA InfoCard	100.024.099
PubChem CID	38619
UNII	VG88AI08JA
CompTox Dashboard (EPA)	DTXSID70883488
- InChI: InChI=1S/C15H17N/c16-12-15(14-9-5-2-6-10-14)11-13-7-3-1-4-8-13/h1-10,15H,11-12,16H2 Key: RHRYWWVGUVEZRJ-UHFFFAOYSA-N
- SMILES: C1=CC=C(C=C1)CC(CN)C2=CC=CC=C2

Properties
Chemical formula	C_{15}H_{17}N
Molar mass	211.308 g·mol^{−1}
- Except where otherwise noted, data are given for materials in their standard state (at 25 °C [77 °F], 100 kPa). verify (what is ?) Infobox references

2,3-Diphenylpropylamine is a form of diphenylpropylamine. Martin Freund and Paul Remse first reported its synthesis in 1890 from the corresponding vinyl nitrile.
