= 6-APT =

Chemical compound

Clinical data
- Routes of administration: Oral
- ATC code: none

Legal status
- Legal status: Uncontrolled (but may be covered under the Federal Analogue Act in the United States and under similar bills in other countries)

Identifiers
- IUPAC name: 1-(5,6,7,8-Tetrahydronaphthalen-2-yl)propan-2-amine
- CAS Number: 3160-20-1
- PubChem CID: 14964398
- ChemSpider: 23204045
- UNII: F26UB8P44X
- ChEMBL: ChEMBL331488
- CompTox Dashboard (EPA): DTXSID201029471

Chemical and physical data
- Formula: C_{13}H_{19}N
- Molar mass: 189.302 g·mol^{−1}
- 3D model (JSmol): Interactive image
- SMILES: CC(CC1=CC2=C(CCCC2)C=C1)N
- InChI: InChI=1S/C13H19N/c1-10(14)8-11-6-7-12-4-2-3-5-13(12)9-11/h6-7,9-10H,2-5,8,14H2,1H3; Key:UTVKUFYOPJCDPE-UHFFFAOYSA-N

6-(2-Aminopropyl)tetralin (6-APT), also sometimes called tetralinylaminopropane (TAP), is a drug of the amphetamine class which acts as a selective serotonin releasing agent (SSRA). It has IC_{50} values of 121 nM, 6,436 nM, and 3,371 nM for inhibiting the reuptake of serotonin, dopamine, and norepinephrine, respectively. Though it possesses an appreciable in vitro profile, in animal drug discrimination studies it was not found to substitute for MMAI or amphetamine and to only partially substitute for MBDB. This parallels Alexander Shulgin's finding that EDMA (the 1,4-benzodioxine analogue of 6-APT) is limitedly active, and appears to indicate that the pharmacokinetics of both EDMA and 6-APT may not be favorable.

== See also ==
- 2-Aminotetralin
- 5-APDI
- Naphthylaminopropane
- TH-PVP
- 2C-G-4
