= 2C-G-3 =

Clinical data
- Other names: 2,5-Dimethoxy-3,4-(trimethylene)phenethylamine; 3,4-Trimethylene-2,5-dimethoxyphenethylamine; 3,4-Trimethylene-2,5-DMPEA
- Routes of administration: Oral
- Drug class: Serotonergic psychedelic; Hallucinogen
- ATC code: None

Pharmacokinetic data
- Duration of action: 12–24 hours

Identifiers
- IUPAC name: 2-(4,7-dimethoxy-2,3-dihydro-1H-inden-5-yl)ethanamine
- CAS Number: 207740-19-0
- PubChem CID: 44350123
- ChemSpider: 23206516
- UNII: 9UT94P2UB5
- ChEMBL: ChEMBL341036
- CompTox Dashboard (EPA): DTXSID701016883

Chemical and physical data
- Formula: C_{13}H_{19}NO_{2}
- Molar mass: 221.300 g·mol^{−1}
- 3D model (JSmol): Interactive image
- SMILES: COC1=C2CCCC2=C(C(=C1)CCN)OC
- InChI: InChI=1S/C13H19NO2/c1-15-12-8-9(6-7-14)13(16-2)11-5-3-4-10(11)12/h8H,3-7,14H2,1-2H3; Key:DUYSKWSFDDDWQI-UHFFFAOYSA-N

2C-G-3, also known as 2,5-dimethoxy-3,4-(trimethylene)phenethylamine, is a psychedelic drug of the phenethylamine and 2C families. It is the derivative of 2C-G (2C-G-0) in which the 3,4-dimethyl groups have been connected via an additional carbon atom to form a cyclopentane ring attached to the benzene ring and hence has a dihydroindene ring system.

In his 1991 book PiHKAL (Phenethylamines I Have Known and Loved) and other publications, Alexander Shulgin lists 2C-G-3's dose as 16 to 25 mg orally and its duration as 12 to 24 hours. The effects of 2C-G-3 were reported to include "lots of LSD-like sparkles", easier communication, impairment, and social avoidance, among others. One report remarked that it was "marvelous".

The chemical synthesis of 2C-G-3 has been described.

The drug was first described in the literature by Shulgin in PiHKAL in 1991. It is a controlled substance in Canada under phenethylamine blanket-ban language.

== See also ==
- 2C (psychedelics)
- 2C-G (2C-G-0)
- 2C-G-5 and 2C-G-N
- Ganesha and G-3
- 5-APDI (IAP)
- DMMDA
