= G-N (drug) =

Clinical data
- Other names: GN; Ganesha-N; GANESHA-N; 3C-G-N; 1,4-Dimethoxynaphthyl-2-isopropylamine; DOG-N
- Routes of administration: Oral
- ATC code: None

Pharmacokinetic data
- Duration of action: Unknown

Identifiers
- IUPAC name: 1-(1,4-dimethoxynaphthalen-2-yl)propan-2-amine
- CAS Number: 477904-62-4
- PubChem CID: 9925746
- ChemSpider: 8101381

Chemical and physical data
- Formula: C_{15}H_{19}NO_{2}
- Molar mass: 245.322 g·mol^{−1}
- 3D model (JSmol): Interactive image
- SMILES: CC(CC1=C(C2=CC=CC=C2C(=C1)OC)OC)N
- InChI: InChI=1S/C15H19NO2/c1-10(16)8-11-9-14(17-2)12-6-4-5-7-13(12)15(11)18-3/h4-7,9-10H,8,16H2,1-3H3; Key:KWKDBIVLRQTMKR-UHFFFAOYSA-N

G-N, also known as 1,4-dimethoxynaphthyl-2-isopropylamine, is a chemical compound of the phenethylamine, amphetamine, DOx, and naphthylethylamine families. It is one of several homologues of Ganesha (G).

In his book PiHKAL (Phenethylamines I Have Known and Loved) and other publications, Alexander Shulgin lists G-N's dose as unknown and its duration as unknown. He described trying the compound at an initial dose of 2 mg orally, which produced no effects, but did not complete its evaluation or try higher doses.

The chemical synthesis of G-N has been described.

G-N was first described in the literature by Shulgin in PiHKAL in 1991. It is a controlled substance in Canada under phenethylamine blanket-ban language.

== See also ==
- Ganesha (psychedelics)
- DOx (psychedelics)
- 2C-G-N
- Naphthylaminopropane (NAP; PAL-287)
