= 2-Iodomescaline =

Clinical data
- Other names: 2-I-M; 2-Iodo-3,4,5-trimethoxyphenethylamine
- Drug class: Serotonin receptor modulator
- ATC code: None

Identifiers
- IUPAC name: 2-(2-iodo-3,4,5-trimethoxyphenyl)ethanamine
- PubChem CID: 10759353
- ChemSpider: 8934672

Chemical and physical data
- Formula: C_{11}H_{16}INO_{3}
- Molar mass: 337.157 g·mol^{−1}
- 3D model (JSmol): Interactive image
- SMILES: COC1=C(C(=C(C(=C1)CCN)I)OC)OC
- InChI: InChI=1S/C11H16INO3/c1-14-8-6-7(4-5-13)9(12)11(16-3)10(8)15-2/h6H,4-5,13H2,1-3H3; Key:VMDLLVSUNOVICJ-UHFFFAOYSA-N

2-Iodomescaline (2-I-M), also known as 2-iodo-3,4,5-trimethoxyphenethylamine, is a serotonin receptor modulator of the phenethylamine and scaline families related to mescaline. It is the 2-iodo derivative of mescaline. The drug shows affinity for the serotonin 5-HT_{1A}, 5-HT_{2A}, and 5-HT_{2C} receptors (K_{i} = 190 nM, 376 nM, and 240 nM, respectively). These affinities were 16-fold, 12-fold, and 32-fold higher than those of mescaline, respectively. The drug is not known to have been tested in animals or humans.

The chemical synthesis of 2-iodomescaline has been described. 2-Iodomescaline was first described in the scientific literature by Jose A. Sintas and colleagues by 1998. Subsequently, it was described in greater detail by Daniel Trachsel and colleagues in 2013. The source of the information cited by Trachsel and colleagues was personal communication with David E. Nichols in 2010. It is not a controlled substance in Canada as of 2025.

== See also ==
- Scaline
- 2-Bromomescaline
- 2-Chloromescaline
- 2-Methylmescaline
- TeMPEA (2-methoxymescaline)
