= 6-Chloro-MDA =

Clinical data
- Other names: 6-Cl-MDA; 6-Chloro-3,4-methylenedioxyamphetamine; 2-Chloro-4,5-methylenedioxyamphetamine; 2-Chloro-4,5-MDA; 2-Cl-4,5-MDA; C-MDA; 6CL-MDA
- Routes of administration: Oral
- Drug class: Psychoactive drug
- ATC code: None

Identifiers
- IUPAC name: 1-(6-chloro-1,3-benzodioxol-5-yl)propan-2-amine
- CAS Number: 46319-44-2
- PubChem CID: 54273706
- ChemSpider: 26472460
- UNII: WNY6GNA2UW

Chemical and physical data
- Formula: C_{10}H_{12}ClNO_{2}
- Molar mass: 213.66 g·mol^{−1}
- 3D model (JSmol): Interactive image
- SMILES: CC(CC1=CC2=C(C=C1Cl)OCO2)N
- InChI: InChI=1S/C10H12ClNO2/c1-6(12)2-7-3-9-10(4-8(7)11)14-5-13-9/h3-4,6H,2,5,12H2,1H3; Key:RLXSVYSNRAKQGZ-UHFFFAOYSA-N

6-Chloro-MDA, also known as 6-chloro-3,4-methylenedioxyamphetamine or as 2-chloro-4,5-methylenedioxyamphetamine (2-Cl-4,5-MDA), is a psychoactive drug of the phenethylamine, amphetamine, and MDxx families related to 3,4-methylenedioxyamphetamine (MDA). It is the 6-chloro derivative of MDA. The drug has an active dose of 160 mg orally and a duration of approximately 8 hours. It is a weak monoamine oxidase inhibitor (MAOI). 6-Chloro-MDA was first described in the scientific literature by 1970. The properties of 6-chloro-MDA in humans were described by Daniel Trachsel and colleagues in 2013 via personal communication with P. Rausch in 2009.

== See also ==
- Substituted methylenedioxyphenethylamine
- 6-Chloro-MDMA
- 6-Bromo-MDA
- 6-Bromo-MDMA
- DFMDA
