= 2C-G-N =

Clinical data
- Other names: 2C-G-NPH; 2C-NPH; 1,4-Dimethoxynaphthyl-2-ethylamine
- Routes of administration: Oral
- Drug class: Psychoactive drug; Stimulant; Antidepressant
- ATC code: None

Pharmacokinetic data
- Duration of action: 20–30 hours

Identifiers
- IUPAC name: 2-(1,4-dimethoxynaphthalen-2-yl)ethanamine
- CAS Number: 207740-21-4
- PubChem CID: 21796713
- ChemSpider: 10546842
- UNII: O5LSQ8027D
- ChEMBL: ChEMBL332505
- CompTox Dashboard (EPA): DTXSID601043215

Chemical and physical data
- Formula: C_{14}H_{17}NO_{2}
- Molar mass: 231.295 g·mol^{−1}
- 3D model (JSmol): Interactive image
- SMILES: COC1=CC(=C(C2=CC=CC=C21)OC)CCN
- InChI: InChI=1S/C14H17NO2/c1-16-13-9-10(7-8-15)14(17-2)12-6-4-3-5-11(12)13/h3-6,9H,7-8,15H2,1-2H3; Key:VKWQEEWEGKDTDE-UHFFFAOYSA-N

2C-G-N, or 2C-G-NPH, also known as 1,4-dimethoxynaphthyl-2-ethylamine, is a psychoactive drug of the phenethylamine, 2C, and naphthylethylamine families. It is the derivative of 2C-G in which the 3,4-dimethyl groups have been extended and connected to form a second benzene ring and hence has a 2-naphthalene ring system.

In his book PiHKAL (Phenethylamines I Have Known and Loved) and other publications, Alexander Shulgin lists 2C-G-N's dose as 20 to 40 mg orally and its duration as 20 to 30 hours. The effects of the drug were reported to include some amphetamine-like stimulation, some possible antidepressant-like effects, "not much psychedelic" but "something really going on anyway", faint uneasiness, and "not as friendly" of effects as other 2C-G compounds. Its activity was described as "on the wane" compared to other 2C-G drugs and as lasting "too long".

The chemical synthesis of 2C-G-N has been described.

The drug was first described in the literature by Shulgin in PiHKAL in 1991. It is a controlled substance in Canada under phenethylamine blanket-ban language.

== See also ==
- 2C (psychedelics)
- Substituted naphthylethylamine
- 2C-G (2C-G-0)
- 2C-G-3 and 2C-G-5
- Ganesha and G-N
