= G-5 (drug) =

Clinical data
- Other names: G5; Ganesha-5; GANESHA-5; 3C-G-5; 3,4-Norbornyl-2,5-dimethoxyamphetamine; 3,6-Dimethoxy-4-(2-aminopropyl)benzonorbornane; DOG-5
- Routes of administration: Oral
- Drug class: Serotonergic psychedelic; Hallucinogen
- ATC code: None

Pharmacokinetic data
- Onset of action: Very slow
- Duration of action: 16–30 hours

Identifiers
- IUPAC name: 1-(3,6-dimethoxy-4-tricyclo[6.2.1.0^{2,7}]undeca-2,4,6-trienyl)propan-2-amine
- CAS Number: 133787-68-5
- PubChem CID: 44719573
- ChemSpider: 23553083

Chemical and physical data
- Formula: C_{16}H_{23}NO_{2}
- Molar mass: 261.365 g·mol^{−1}
- 3D model (JSmol): Interactive image
- SMILES: CC(CC1=CC(=C2C3CCC(C3)C2=C1OC)OC)N
- InChI: InChI=1S/C16H23NO2/c1-9(17)6-12-8-13(18-2)14-10-4-5-11(7-10)15(14)16(12)19-3/h8-11H,4-7,17H2,1-3H3; Key:MZFVFTFFHRCTIO-UHFFFAOYSA-N

G-5, also known as 3,4-norbornyl-2,5-dimethoxyamphetamine, is a psychedelic drug of the phenethylamine, amphetamine, and DOx families. It is one of several homologues of Ganesha (G).

== Use and effects ==
In his book PiHKAL (Phenethylamines I Have Known and Loved) and other publications, Alexander Shulgin lists G-5's dose as 14 to 20 mg orally and its duration as 16 to 30 hours. It is said to have a very slow onset. The effects of G-5 were reported to include an unexpected absence of visual and related sensory activity, excellent mental activity, "absence of the bells and whistles that are expected with a psychedelic in full bloom", mental integration, and little or no body load. According to Shulgin, it was somehow lacking in characteristics that would have made it fully favorable, perhaps the lack of perceptual effects, which resulted in there being little drive to further explore it.

== Pharmacology ==
=== Pharmacodynamics ===
G-5 is not a monoamine releasing agent of either serotonin or dopamine.

== Chemistry ==
=== Synthesis ===
The chemical synthesis of G-5 has been described.

== History ==
G-5 was first described in the literature by Alexander Shulgin and colleagues in 1991. Subsequently, it was described in greater detail by Shulgin in his book PiHKAL (Phenethylamines I Have Known and Loved) that same year.

== Society and culture ==
=== Legal status ===
G-5 is a controlled substance in Canada under phenethylamine blanket-ban language.

== See also ==
- Ganesha (psychedelics)
- DOx (psychedelics)
- 2C-G-5
