= Cycloalkylaminopropane =

Cycloalkylaminopropane may refer to:

- Cyclopentylaminopropanes like isocyclamine and cyclopentamine
- Cyclohexylaminopropanes like norpropylhexedrine and propylhexedrine
