= Thiopropamine =

Stimulant drug

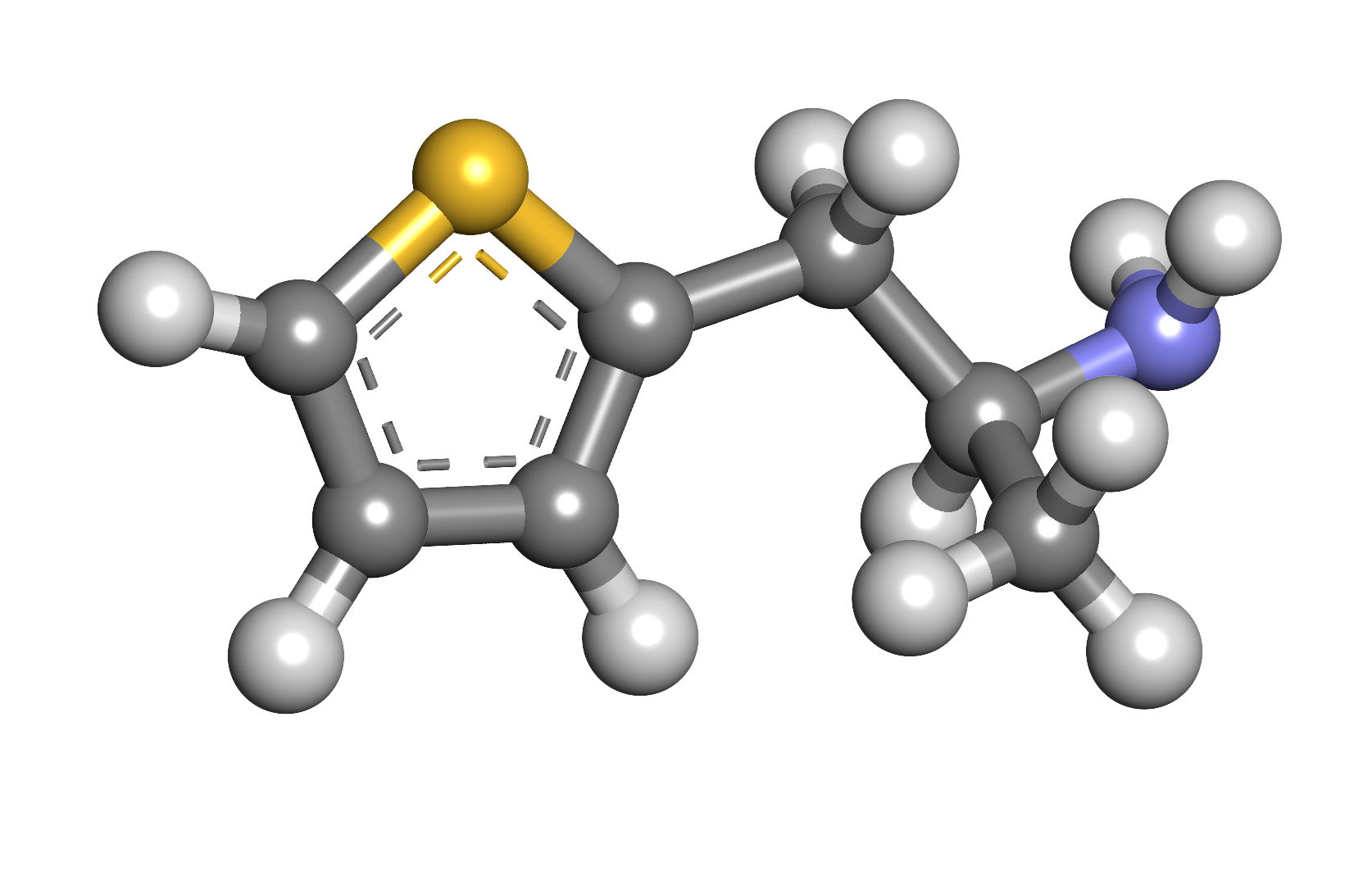

Clinical data
- Other names: Thiophenylpropylamine; 1-Methyl-2-thiophen-2-yl-ethylamine; 2-(2-Aminopropyl)thiophene; 1-(2-Thienyl)-2-aminopropane

Legal status
- Legal status: CA: <Schedule I; DE: Anlage I (Authorized scientific use only)

Identifiers
- IUPAC name: 1-(thiophen-2-yl)-2-aminopropane
- CAS Number: 30433-93-3
- PubChem CID: 6484133
- ChemSpider: 4984575
- UNII: N60H4ZDD14
- ChEMBL: ChEMBL95500
- CompTox Dashboard (EPA): DTXSID80424381

Chemical and physical data
- Formula: C_{7}H_{11}NS
- Molar mass: 141.23 g·mol^{−1}
- 3D model (JSmol): Interactive image
- SMILES: CC(N)Cc1sccc1
- InChI: InChI=1S/C7H11NS/c1-6(8)5-7-3-2-4-9-7/h2-4,6H,5,8H2,1H3; Key:NYVQQTOGYLBBDQ-UHFFFAOYSA-N

Thiopropamine, also known as 1-(2-thienyl)-2-aminopropane, is a stimulant drug of the arylalkylamine family. It is an analogue of amphetamine where the phenyl ring has been replaced by thiophene. It has similar stimulant effects to amphetamine but with around one third the potency. The N-methyl and thiophen-3-yl analogues are also known and are somewhat more potent, though still generally weaker than the corresponding amphetamines.

== Pharmacology ==
Like amphetamine and most of its analogues, thiopropamine most likely is a norepinephrine–dopamine reuptake inhibitor and/or releasing agent.

Thiopropamine is likely to be metabolized into active 4-hydroxymethiopropamine and thiophene S-oxides. These are further deaminated by CYP2C in liver transforming them into inactive 1-(Thiophen-2-yl)-2-propan-2-one which is a phenylacetone derivative. Propan-2-amines are not metabolized by monoamine oxidases and most actually behave as competitive monoamine oxidase inhibitors.

== Chemistry ==
=== Derivatives ===
Derivatives of thiopropamine include the following:

- 5-Cl-bk-MPA (5-chloro-β-keto-methiopropamine)
- 5-Methylmethiopropamine (5-MMPA; mephedrene)
- α‑Pyrrolidinopentiothiophenone (α-PVT)
- Ethiopropamine (N-ethylthiopropamine; EPA)
- Methiopropamine (N-methylthiopropamine; MPA)
- Thiothinone (β-ketomethiopropamine; βk-MPA)

== See also ==
- 2-Furylethylamine
- Cyclopentamine
- Propylhexedrine
