= C9H19N =

The molecular formula C_{9}H_{19}N (molar mass: 141.25 g/mol, exact mass: 141.1517 u) may refer to:

- Isometheptene, a sympathomimetic amine
- N-Methylconiine
- Norpropylhexedrine
- 2,2,6,6-Tetramethylpiperidine
- Cyclopentamine
