= C6H10N2 =

The molecular formula C_{6}H_{10}N_{2} (molar mass: 110.16 g/mol) may refer to:

- 2-Pyrrolylethylamine
- 3-Pyrrolylethylamine
