= Pyrrolylethylamine =

Pyrrolylethylamine may refer to:

- 2-Pyrrolylethylamine
- 3-Pyrrolylethylamine
