= Cycloalkylamine =

Class of chemical compounds

Cycloalkylamines are chemical compounds featuring a cycloalkyl group and an amine. Some examples include propylhexedrine, cyclopentamine, cypenamine, and tranylcypromine. Some chemicals act as stimulants.
