= C8H17N =

The molecular formula C_{8}H_{17}N (molar mass: 127.23 g/mol; exact mass: 127.136099 u) may refer to:

- Coniine
- Isocyclamine
