= C7H12N2 =

The molecular formula C_{7}H_{12}N_{2} may refer to:

- 1,5-Diazabicyclo(4.3.0)non-5-ene
- 3-Pyrrolylpropylamine
