= Arylalkylamine =

Class of chemical compounds

Substituted arylalkylamines, also alternatively known in many cases as substituted arylethylamines, are a group of chemical compounds. These compounds are divided into two main categories: indolylalkylamines and phenylalkylamines.

- Indolylalkylamines include substances like tryptamines, which are found in some natural compounds and can affect mood and perception.
- Phenylalkylamines include substances like phenethylamines and amphetamines, which are found in both natural and synthetic forms.

These compounds are related to monoamine neurotransmitters, which are chemicals in the brain that transmit signals between nerve cells. Because of this, substituted arylalkylamines can have a wide range of effects on the body and mind. They are used in many medications, including:

- Psychostimulants, which increase alertness and energy.
- Anorectics, which suppress appetite.
- Wakefulness-promoting agents, which help people stay awake.
- Bronchodilators, which make breathing easier.
- Decongestants, which relieve nasal congestion.
- Antidepressants, which are used to treat depression.
- Entactogens, which enhance feelings of emotional closeness.
- Psychedelics, which alter perception and consciousness.

Many arylalkylamines act as monoamine releasing agents, monoamine reuptake inhibitors, and/or monoamine receptor modulators.

Examples of arylalkylamines and related compounds of different classes
Phenethylamine

Thiopropamine

2-Furylethylamine

2-Tetrahydrofurylethylamine

2-Pyrrolylethylamine

3-Pyrrolylethylamine

Cyclopentamine

Propylhexedrine

Tryptamine

Isotryptamine

1ZP2MA

3-APB

3-APBT

Methylhexanamine

Histamine

Muscimol

Many more foundational arylalkylamines besides the above also exist. In addition, other alkylamines and non-aromatic cyclized alkylamines exist.

== See also ==
- Amine
- Alkylamines (disambiguation)
- Arylamine
