= 2-Tetrahydrofurylethylamine =

Clinical data
- Other names: TH-FEA; 2-(2-Tetrahydrofuryl)ethylamine; 2-Aminoethyltetrahydrofuran; Tetrahydrofurfurylmethylamine

Identifiers
- IUPAC name: 2-(oxolan-2-yl)ethanamine
- CAS Number: 98277-97-5
- PubChem CID: 4854736
- ChemSpider: 4039901
- CompTox Dashboard (EPA): DTXSID10406630
- ECHA InfoCard: 100.252.264

Chemical and physical data
- Formula: C_{6}H_{13}NO
- Molar mass: 115.176 g·mol^{−1}
- 3D model (JSmol): Interactive image
- SMILES: C1CC(OC1)CCN
- InChI: InChI=1S/C6H13NO/c7-4-3-6-2-1-5-8-6/h6H,1-5,7H2; Key:ZCOIVJPCZLPQPT-UHFFFAOYSA-N

2-Tetrahydrofurylethylamine (TH-FEA or 2-(2-tetrahydrofuryl)ethylamine) is a drug related to the arylalkylamines. Analogues include 2-furylethylamine (FEA), 2-pyrrolylethylamine (NEA), β-phenethylamine, amphetamine, and thiopropamine, among others. A few derivatives of TH-FEA are known. The compound is pharmacologically active, producing a strong constricting effect on the uterus. TH-FEA was first described in the scientific literature by 1920.
