= Ethiopropamine =

Chemical compound

Clinical data
- Other names: EPA; N-Ethylthiopropamine

Identifiers
- IUPAC name: N-ethyl-1-(thiophen-2-yl)propan-2-amine
- CAS Number: 2752081-09-5
- PubChem CID: 19026398

Chemical and physical data
- Formula: C_{9}H_{15}NS
- Molar mass: 169.29 g·mol^{−1}
- 3D model (JSmol): Interactive image
- SMILES: CC(NCC)Cc1cccs1
- InChI: InChI=1S/C9H15NS/c1-3-10-8(2)7-9-5-4-6-11-9/h4-6,8,10H,3,7H2,1-2H3; Key:COWHJKNRHICALL-UHFFFAOYSA-N

Ethiopropamine (EPA), also known as N-ethylthiopropamine, is a stimulant drug which is the ethyl homologue of methiopropamine, or the thiophene analogue of ethamphetamine. It has been sold as a designer drug, first identified in Slovenia in 2021.

== See also ==
- 5-Methylmethiopropamine
- 5-Cl-bk-MPA
- Ethcathinone
