= 3-Pyrrolylethylamine =

Clinical data
- Other names: 3-NEA; 2-(1H-Pyrrol-3-yl)ethylamine; 3-(2-Aminoethyl)pyrrole

Identifiers
- IUPAC name: 2-(1H-pyrrol-3-yl)ethanamine
- CAS Number: 73625-10-2 73625-09-9
- PubChem CID: 13437354
- ChemSpider: 14562434

Chemical and physical data
- Formula: C_{6}H_{10}N_{2}
- Molar mass: 110.160 g·mol^{−1}
- 3D model (JSmol): Interactive image
- SMILES: C1=CNC=C1CCN
- InChI: InChI=1S/C6H10N2/c7-3-1-6-2-4-8-5-6/h2,4-5,8H,1,3,7H2; Key:ZBJSHMBQYSDTGK-UHFFFAOYSA-N

3-Pyrrolylethylamine (3-NEA or 2-(1H-pyrrol-3-yl)ethylamine) is a chemical compound of the arylalkylamine family. It can be thought of as the analogue of tryptamine (2-indolylethylamine) in which the benzene component of the indole ring has been removed, leaving only a pyrrole ring.

The compound is also related to other arylalkylamines as well as trace amines including phenethylamine (2-phenylethylamine), 2-furylethylamine, thiopropamine (1-(2-thienyl)-2-aminopropane), and isocyclamine (cyclopentanylaminopropane), among others. Many of these compounds are monoamine releasing agents and/or reuptake inhibitors.

3-NEA was first described in the scientific literature by 1965.

== See also ==
- 2-Pyrrolylethylamine
- 3-Pyrrolylpropylamine
