= C6H13NO =

The molecular formula C_{6}H_{13}NO may refer to:

- 2-Tetrahydrofurylethylamine
- Diacetonamine
