= Norpropylhexedrine =

Metabolite of propylhexedrine

Clinical data
- Other names: Hexahydrodesoxynorephedrine; Methylcyclohexaneethanamine; Cycohexylisopropylamine; Cycohexyaminopropane

Legal status
- Legal status: Depends on jurisdiction

Identifiers
- IUPAC name: 1-Cyclohexyl-2-propanamine
- CAS Number: 54704-34-6
- PubChem CID: 115665
- ChemSpider: 103441
- UNII: MD9NVM57VJ
- CompTox Dashboard (EPA): DTXSID70875843

Chemical and physical data
- Formula: C_{9}H_{19}N
- Molar mass: 141.258 g·mol^{−1}
- 3D model (JSmol): Interactive image
- Chirality: Racemic mixture
- SMILES: CC(CC1CCCCC1)N
- InChI: InChI=1S/C9H19N/c1-8(10)7-9-5-3-2-4-6-9/h8-9H,2-7,10H2,1H3; Key:GIXSTBOIKJPUKD-UHFFFAOYSA-N

Norpropylhexedrine is an adrenergic amine of the cycloalkylamine class and is the desmethyl analog of propylhexedrine. It is not approved by any regulatory agency for pharmaceutical use.

Norpropylhexedrine is a metabolite of propylhexedrine.

== See also ==
- Barbexaclone
- Propylhexedrine
