= Cyclohexylacetone =

Names
- Preferred IUPAC name 1-Cyclohexylpropan-2-one

Identifiers
CAS Number	103-78-6
3D model (JSmol)	Interactive image
ChemSpider	60261
ECHA InfoCard	100.002.858
EC Number	203-143-9
PubChem CID	66899
UNII	V54Y1GAG9I
CompTox Dashboard (EPA)	DTXSID2059279
- InChI: InChI=1S/C9H16O/c1-8(10)7-9-5-3-2-4-6-9/h9H,2-7H2,1H3 Key: UHBZEAPZATVYKV-UHFFFAOYSA-N
- SMILES: O=C(CC1CCCCC1)C

Properties
Chemical formula	C_{9}H_{16}O
Molar mass	140.226 g·mol^{−1}
Density	0.905 g/cm^{3}
Boiling point	198 to 200 °C (388 to 392 °F; 471 to 473 K)
- Except where otherwise noted, data are given for materials in their standard state (at 25 °C [77 °F], 100 kPa). Infobox references

Cyclohexylacetone (acetonylcyclohexane) is an organic compound. Cyclohexylacetone is closely related to phenylacetone being phenylacetone with the benzene ring replaced with a cyclohexane ring.

== Applications ==
Propylhexedrine can be synthesized from cyclohexylacetone through the reductive amination of an intermediary imine over an aluminum-mercury amalgam in the presence of a hydrogen source.

Another cyclohexylacetone use is in the production of droprenilamine.

== See also ==
- Phenylacetone
