= Cypenamine =

Chemical compound

Clinical data
- Other names: 2-Phenylcyclopentanamine
- ATC code: none

Identifiers
- IUPAC name: (±)-trans-2-phenylcyclopentan-1-amine
- CAS Number: 15301-54-9
- PubChem CID: 21786
- ChemSpider: 20476
- UNII: VP9115827H
- ChEMBL: ChEMBL2110918
- CompTox Dashboard (EPA): DTXSID40546452

Chemical and physical data
- Formula: C_{11}H_{15}N
- Molar mass: 161.248 g·mol^{−1}
- 3D model (JSmol): Interactive image
- Chirality: Racemic mixture
- SMILES: N[C@H]1CCC[C@@H]1C2=CC=CC=C2
- InChI: InChI=1S/C11H15N/c12-11-8-4-7-10(11)9-5-2-1-3-6-9/h1-3,5-6,10-11H,4,7-8,12H2; Key:VNGYTYNUZHDMPP-UHFFFAOYSA-N

Cypenamine (INN, BAN), or cypenamine hydrochloride (USAN), also known as 2-phenylcyclopentylamine, is a psychostimulant drug which was developed by a group at the William S. Merrell Chemical Company in the 1940s. It is currently known only in scientific research and has never been developed for market use. Cypenamine is currently legal throughout the entire world, and though its chemical structure has a vague similarity to certain controlled stimulants like fencamfamine, it is likely that it is too distant for it to be considered an illicit analogue under the United States Federal Analogue Act of the Controlled Substances Act.

== Chemistry ==
=== Stereochemistry ===
Cypenamine enantiomers.

2-Phenylcyclopentan-1-amine is a compound with two stereocenters. Thus, the following two enantiomeric pairs may exist:

- (1RS,2SR)-trans-2-phenylcyclopentan-1-amine
- (1RS,2RS)-cis-2-phenylcyclopentan-1-amine

The racemate (±)-trans-2-phenylcyclopentan-1-amine [1:1 mixture of (1R,2S)-trans-2-phenylcyclopentan-1-amine (box, left) and (1S,2R)-trans-2-phenylcyclopentan-1-amine (box, right)] is the active ingredient of cypenamine. Furthermore, the kinetic resolution of (±)-trans-2-phenylcyclopentan-1-amine by lipase B from Candida antarctica may be effectively performed by an aminolysis reaction.

Racemic cis-2-phenylcyclopentan-1-amine [1:1 mixture of (1R,2R)-cis-2-phenylcyclopentan-1-amine and (1S,2S)-cis-2-phenylcyclopentan-1-amine] has found no pharmacological application.

=== Homology ===
Cypenamine is a homolog of tranylcypromine, containing an expanded alicyclic ring that is two methylene units larger than the highly strained/reactive cyclopropane. The cyclohexane homologue has been reported, although the LD_{50}s were all less than for plain amphetamine, it was still a functional stimulant.

== See also ==
- Amphetamine
- Cyclopentamine
- Methamphetamine
- Propylhexedrine
