= 3-Pyrrolylpropylamine =

Clinical data
- Other names: α-Methyl-3-pyrrolylethylamine; 3-Pyrrolepropylamine

Identifiers
- IUPAC name: 1-(1H-pyrrol-3-yl)propan-2-amine
- CAS Number: 128600-49-7
- PubChem CID: 13437356
- ChemSpider: 23182624
- ChEMBL: ChEMBL328939

Chemical and physical data
- Formula: C_{7}H_{12}N_{2}
- Molar mass: 124.187 g·mol^{−1}
- 3D model (JSmol): Interactive image
- SMILES: CC(CC1=CNC=C1)N
- InChI: InChI=1S/C7H12N2/c1-6(8)4-7-2-3-9-5-7/h2-3,5-6,9H,4,8H2,1H3; Key:XMTHAWZPEGHZPK-UHFFFAOYSA-N

3-Pyrrolylpropylamine, also known as α-methyl-3-pyrrolylethylamine, is a chemical compound of the arylalkylamine family. It is the analogue of the serotonergic psychedelic α-methyltryptamine (AMT) in which the benzene component of the indole ring has been removed.

In contrast to tryptamines like AMT, 3-pyrrolylpropylamine does not bind to the serotonin 5-HT_{1A} or 5-HT_{2A} receptors (K_{i} = >10,000 nM). These findings suggest that the benzene part of the indole ring is required for significant binding to serotonin receptors and by extension psychedelic activity. The activities of 3-pyrrolylpropylamine at other targets, such as the monoamine transporters, were not reported.

3-Pyrrolylpropylamine was first described in the scientific literature by at least 1990.

== See also ==
- 3-Pyrrolylethylamine
- 2-Pyrrolylethylamine
