= Thiothinone =

Stimulant designer drug

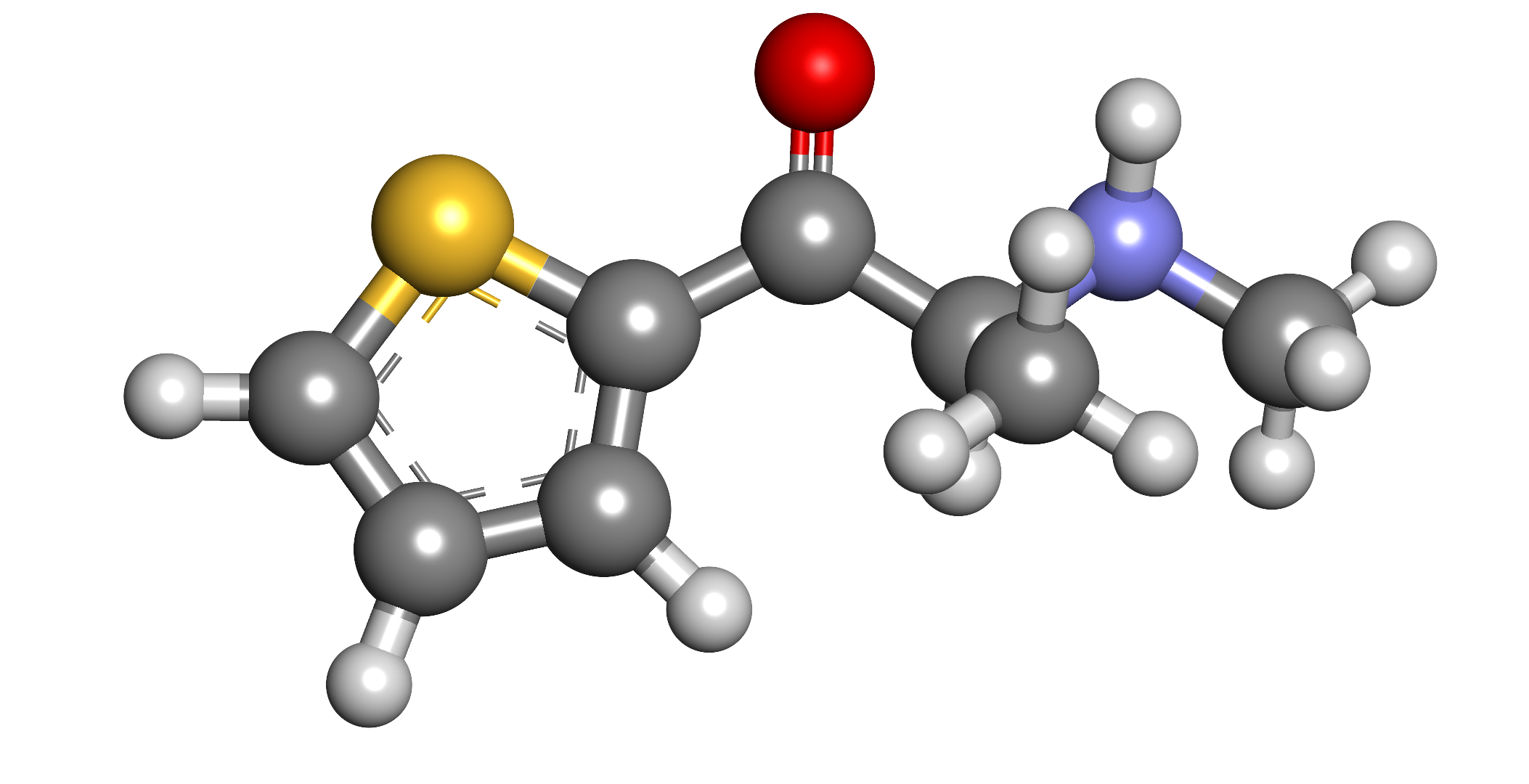

Clinical data
- Other names: β-Ketomethiopropamine; βk-Methiopropamine; βk-MPA

Legal status
- Legal status: DE: NpSG (Industrial and scientific use only); UK: Class B

Identifiers
- IUPAC name: 2-(methylamino)-1-(thiophen-2-yl)propan-1-one
- CAS Number: 24065-17-6 54817-67-3 (hydrochloride)
- PubChem CID: 12198617
- ChemSpider: 16113492
- UNII: 8C758Z7L72
- CompTox Dashboard (EPA): DTXSID901031598

Chemical and physical data
- Formula: C_{8}H_{11}NOS
- Molar mass: 169.24 g·mol^{−1}
- 3D model (JSmol): Interactive image
- SMILES: CC(C(=O)C1=CC=CS1)NC
- InChI: InChI=1S/C8H11NOS/c1-6(9-2)8(10)7-4-3-5-11-7/h3-6,9H,1-2H3; Key:DOZQPYDMJMLVKX-UHFFFAOYSA-N

Thiothinone, also known as β-ketomethiopropamine or βk-methiopropamine (βk-MPA) is a stimulant that is the β-keto-substituted analog of methiopropamine and has been sold online as a designer drug. It is structurally related to methcathinone however the phenyl group has been substituted for thiophene instead.

Thiothinone was also reported to be a pyrolysis product of methiopropamine.

== See also ==
- 5-Cl-bk-MPA
- α-Pyrrolidinopentiothiophenone (α-PVT)
- Methcathinone
- Methiopropamine, non-ketone counterpart
