= 2-Furylethylamine =

Clinical data
- Other names: 2-Furylethylamine; Furylethylamine; 2-Furan-2-yl-ethylamine; 2-Furanethanamine; 2-(2-Furyl)ethanamine; 2-(2-Aminoethyl)furan; 2-(Furan-2-yl)ethan-1-amine; Furfurylmethylamine
- ATC code: None

Identifiers
- IUPAC name: 2-(furan-2-yl)ethanamine
- CAS Number: 1121-46-6 86423-58-7 (HCl)
- PubChem CID: 1132863
- ChemSpider: 963066
- ChEMBL: ChEMBL4552984
- CompTox Dashboard (EPA): DTXSID60360632
- ECHA InfoCard: 100.128.411

Chemical and physical data
- Formula: C_{6}H_{9}NO
- Molar mass: 111.144 g·mol^{−1}
- 3D model (JSmol): Interactive image
- SMILES: C1=COC(=C1)CCN
- InChI: InChI=1S/C6H9NO/c7-4-3-6-2-1-5-8-6/h1-2,5H,3-4,7H2; Key:ZQSLNSHMUQXSQJ-UHFFFAOYSA-N

2-Furylethylamine (2-FEA or FEA) is a drug of the arylalkylamine family related to the substituted phenethylamines such as β-phenethylamine (PEA) and amphetamine. It is known to have similar pressor effects as amphetamine and strong constricting effects on the uterus in animals. The psychoactive effects of FEA in humans are unknown.

Derivatives of FEA include α-Me-FEA (furylisopropylamine) and α,N-Me-FEA, among others. α-Me-FEA was less several-fold potent than amphetamine in animals and showed limited effects in humans. Analogues of FEA, besides β-phenethylamine (PEA) and amphetamine (α-Me-PEA), include TH-FEA, α-Me-TH-FEA, ThEA, thiopropamine (α-Me-ThEA), 3-ThEA, 2-(2-pyrrolyl)ethylamine (NEA), and α-Me-NEA, among others. Some of them are known to be active.

FEA was first synthesized by 1920. FEA and analogues were studied by Gordon Alles and colleagues, who discovered its pressor effects. FEA is not a controlled substance in the United States as of 2011.

Phenethylamine

Amphetamine

Thiopropamine

== See also ==
- Arylalkylamine
