= Methiopropamine =

Structural analog of methamphetamine

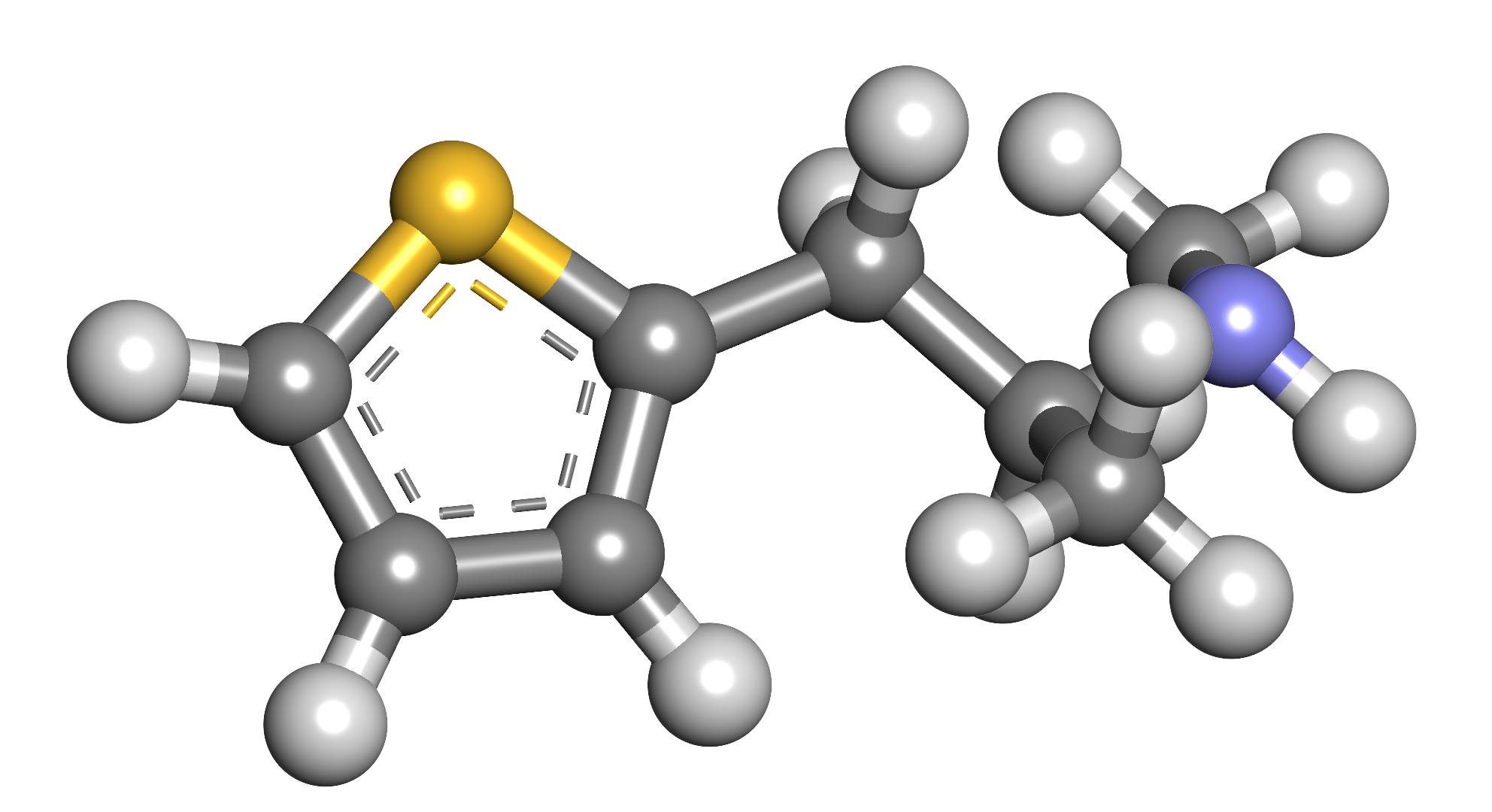

Clinical data
- Other names: MPA; N-Methylthiopropamine; Methiopropamine; Methedrene; Syndrax
- ATC code: N06AA

Legal status
- Legal status: BR: Class F2 (Prohibited psychotropics); DE: Anlage I; UK: Class B; US: Schedule I; Illegal in China, Finland, Florida

Identifiers
- IUPAC name: 1-(thiophen-2-yl)-2-methylaminopropane
- CAS Number: 801156-47-8 7464-94-0 (hydrochloride)
- PubChem CID: 436156
- ChemSpider: 385727
- UNII: 64ON2ETH7I
- KEGG: C22795
- CompTox Dashboard (EPA): DTXSID701016914

Chemical and physical data
- Formula: C_{8}H_{13}NS
- Molar mass: 155.26 g·mol^{−1}
- 3D model (JSmol): Interactive image
- SMILES: CNC(C)CC1=CC=CS1
- InChI: InChI=1S/C8H13NS/c1-7(9-2)6-8-4-3-5-10-8/h3-5,7,9H,6H2,1-2H3; Key:HPHUWHKFQXTZPS-UHFFFAOYSA-N

Methiopropamine (MPA), also known as N-methylthiopropamine, is an organic compound structurally related to methamphetamine. Originally reported in 1942, the molecule consists of a thiophene group with an alkyl amine substituent at the 2-position. It appeared for public sale in the United Kingdom in December 2010 as a "research chemical" or "legal high", recently branded as Blow. It has limited popularity as a recreational stimulant.

== Pharmacology ==
Methiopropamine functions as a norepinephrine–dopamine reuptake inhibitor (NDRI) that is approximately 1.85 times more selective for norepinephrine than dopamine. It is approximately one-third as potent as dextroamphetamine as a norepinephrine reuptake inhibitor and one-fifth as much as a dopamine reuptake inhibitor. It displays negligible activity as a serotonin reuptake inhibitor.

Methiopropamine has the potential for significant acute toxicity with cardiovascular, gastrointestinal, and psychotic symptoms.

== Metabolism ==
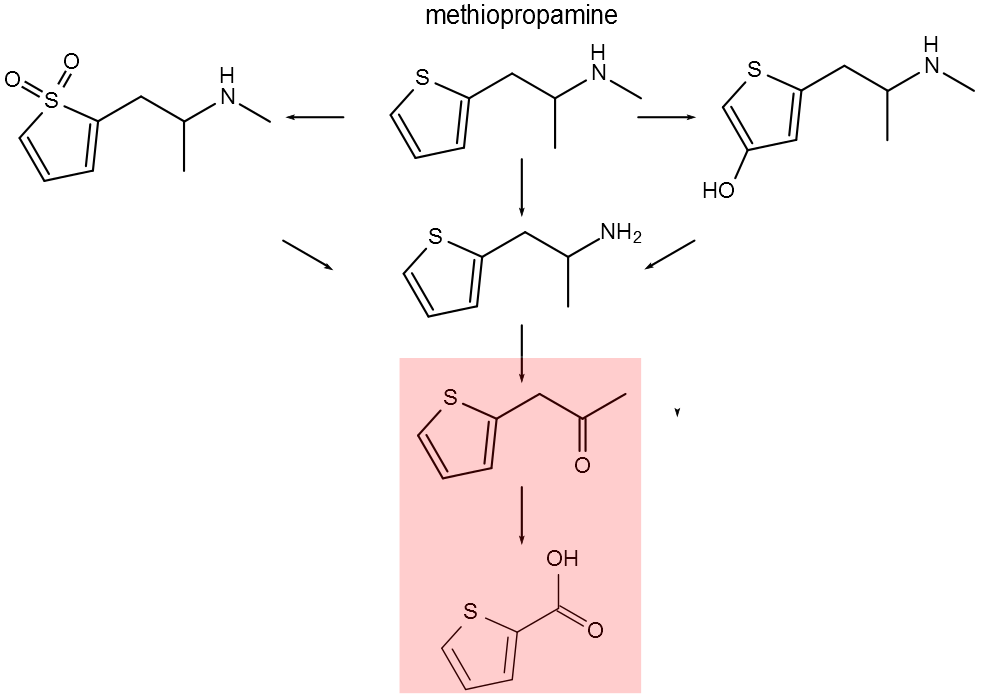
Methiopropamine metabolism is somewhat similar to methamphetamine. Hydroxylation, demethylation and deamination are in common. Formation of thiophene S-oxide is different, as is the end product which will probably be (substituted) thiophene-2-carboxylic acid. It is then excreted in urine. Compounds on red are inactive.

For N-alkyl amphetamines, deamination and N-dealkylation are the major elimination pathways and renal excretion is a minor one.

Methiopropamine is metabolized into active thiopropamine, 4-hydroxymethiopropamine and thiophene S-oxides. These N-demethylated metabolites are further deaminated by the cytochrome P450 enzyme CYP2C19 in the liver transforming them into inactive 1-(thiophen-2-yl)-2-propan-2-one which can be seen as a phenylacetone derivative.

Thiophene-2-carboxylic acid is the final major metabolic product. It is very hydrophilic and is excreted in urine. Methiopropamine and especially thiopropamine are also excreted renally, unchanged.

== Synthesis ==
There is a four-step synthesis of methiopropamine. It begins with (thiophen-2-yl)magnesium bromide, which is reacted with propylene oxide, yielding 1-(thiophen-2-yl)-2-hydroxypropane which is reacted with phosphorus tribromide, yielding 1-(thiophen-2-yl)-2-bromopropane which is finally reacted with methylamine, yielding 1-(thiophen-2-yl)-2-methylaminopropane. Methiopropamine is off-white, yellowish powder.

Four-step synthesis of racemic methiopropamine from (thiophen-2-yl)magnesium bromide.

== Legal status ==
=== China ===
As of October 2015 MPA is a controlled substance in China.

=== Finland ===
Methiopropamine is illegal in Finland, it is scheduled in "government decree on narcotic substances, preparations and plants".

=== Germany ===
Methiopropamine is explicitly illegal in Germany.

=== United Kingdom ===
Following the ban on ethylphenidate, authorities noticed an increase in methiopropamine use by injecting users. The ACMD suggested it be banned on 18 November 2015 as it had similar effects to ethylphenidate. The government enacted a temporary drug control order a week later which came into force on 27 November 2015. Though ordinarily the TCDO would only last 1 year, the ACMD reported that since its invocation prevalence of MPA had significantly decreased, and that it had been challenging to collect information about the drug. As a result of this, they requested that the TCDO be extended a further year.

Methiopropanine was made a Class B controlled drug under the Misuse of Drugs Act 1971 (as amended) (Amendment)(No.2) Order 2017 [SI 2017/1114], this came into effect on the 27th of November 2017.

=== United States ===
Methiopropamine is scheduled at the federal level in the United States. The DEA had planned to place methiopropamine in Schedule I of Controlled Substances and was accepting public comments until October 4, 2021. Later, the compound was placed in Schedule I.

==== Florida ====
Methiopropamine is a Schedule I controlled substance in the state of Florida making it illegal to buy, sell, or possess in Florida.

=== Tasmania (Australia) ===
Methiopropamine is a "controlled substance" and therefore an "illegal drug" to import, possess or sell/traffic in without express authority of the relevant government agency.

== See also ==
- 5-MMPA
- α-Pyrrolidinopentiothiophenone (α-PVT)
- Thiopropamine, demethylated counterpart
- Propylhexedrine, another ring substituted stimulant used as over-the-counter decongestant
- Thiothinone
