= 2-Pyrrolylethylamine =

Clinical data
- Other names: 2-(2-Pyrrolyl)ethylamine; NEA; 2-NEA

Identifiers
- IUPAC name: 2-(1H-pyrrol-2-yl)ethanamine
- CAS Number: 40808-62-6
- PubChem CID: 13437360
- ChemSpider: 13937234
- CompTox Dashboard (EPA): DTXSID20540817

Chemical and physical data
- Formula: C_{6}H_{10}N_{2}
- Molar mass: 110.160 g·mol^{−1}
- 3D model (JSmol): Interactive image
- SMILES: C1=CNC(=C1)CCN
- InChI: InChI=1S/C6H10N2/c7-4-3-6-2-1-5-8-6/h1-2,5,8H,3-4,7H2; Key:IAZZNTYMXXEHHT-UHFFFAOYSA-N

2-Pyrrolylethylamine (NEA, 2-NEA, or 2-(2-pyrrolyl)ethylamine) is a chemical compound of the arylalkylamine family.

It is related to other arylalkylamines as well as trace amines including tryptamine (2-indolylethylamine), phenethylamine (2-phenylethylamine), 2-furylethylamine, thiopropamine (1-(2-thienyl)-2-aminopropane), and isocyclamine (cyclopentanylaminopropane), among others. Many of these compounds are monoamine releasing agents and/or reuptake inhibitors.

NEA is known to be pharmacologically active itself, for instance having histamine-like activity on the isolated guinea pig ileum and having effects on gastric acid secretion in dogs.

The compound was first described in the scientific literature by 1949.

== See also ==
- 3-Pyrrolylethylamine
- 3-Pyrrolylpropylamine
