= Barbexaclone =

Chemical compound

Combination of
- Phenobarbital: Barbiturate
- Levopropylhexedrine: Sympathomimetic

Clinical data
- AHFS/Drugs.com: International Drug Names
- ATC code: N03AA04 (WHO)

Legal status
- Legal status: BR: Class B1 (Psychoactive drugs); US: Schedule IV

Identifiers
- CAS Number: 4388-82-3
- PubChem CID: 71196
- DrugBank: DB09001
- ChemSpider: 64332
- UNII: 291GX1YB65
- CompTox Dashboard (EPA): DTXSID90195974
- ECHA InfoCard: 100.022.278

Barbexaclone (Maliasin) is a salt compound of phenobarbital and levopropylhexedrine. It was introduced in 1965. It has been reported to be as effective as phenobarbital but better tolerated; however, as of 2004, these "promising results" had not yet been confirmed nor denied in controlled trials.

== Potency ==
100 mg of barbexaclone is equivalent to 60 mg of phenobarbital.
