= 5-Methylmethiopropamine =

Stimulant designer drugs

Legal status
- Legal status: DE: NpSG (Industrial and scientific use only); UK: Under Psychoactive Substances Act

Identifiers
- IUPAC name: N-methyl-1-(5-methylthiophen-2-yl)propan-2-amine
- CAS Number: 1340105-79-4
- PubChem CID: 64487873
- ChemSpider: 46249721
- UNII: ZP92FK3KK5

Chemical and physical data
- Formula: C_{9}H_{15}NS
- Molar mass: 169.29 g·mol^{−1}
- 3D model (JSmol): Interactive image
- SMILES: CC1=CC=C(S1)CC(C)NC
- InChI: InChI=1S/C9H15NS/c1-7(10-3)6-9-5-4-8(2)11-9/h4-5,7,10H,6H2,1-3H3; Key:HZICDJQMPRFRKC-UHFFFAOYSA-N

5-Methylmethiopropamine (5-MMPA, mephedrene) is a stimulant drug which is a ring-substituted derivative of methiopropamine. It is not a substituted cathinone derivative like mephedrone, as it lacks a ketone group at the β position of the aliphatic side chain, but instead more closely resembles substituted amphetamines. It has been sold as a designer drug, first being identified in Germany in June 2020.

== See also ==
- 3-Chloromethamphetamine
- 3-Methylamphetamine
- 3-Methylmethcathinone
- 5-Cl-bk-MPA
- Ethiopropamine
