= Alkylamines =

Alkylamines may refer to:

- Aliphatic amine
- Psychotropic alkylamines
