= 5-Cl-bk-MPA =

Chemical compound

Legal status
- Legal status: DE: NpSG (Industrial and scientific use only); UK: Class B

Identifiers
- IUPAC name: 1-(5-chlorothiophen-2-yl)-2-(methylamino)propan-1-one
- CAS Number: 1368498-75-2
- PubChem CID: 82282703
- ChemSpider: 72841860
- UNII: 4F8W3K5FA4
- CompTox Dashboard (EPA): DTXSID801336880

Chemical and physical data
- Formula: C_{8}H_{10}ClNOS
- Molar mass: 203.68 g·mol^{−1}
- 3D model (JSmol): Interactive image
- SMILES: O=C(C(C)NC)c1ccc(Cl)s1
- InChI: InChI=1S/C8H10ClNOS/c1-5(10-2)8(11)6-3-4-7(9)12-6/h3-5,10H,1-2H3; Key:VTSPXQPERGVFBV-UHFFFAOYSA-N

5-Chloro-β-keto-methiopropamine (5-Cl-βk-MPA) is a recreational designer drug with stimulant effects. It is a substituted cathinone derivative with a thiophene core, closely related to better known drugs such as βk-Methiopropamine and mephedrene.

== Legality ==
=== Hungary ===
5-Cl-βk-MPA was first identified in Hungary in 2017, and was made illegal in 2018.

=== Italy ===
5-Cl-βk-MPA was made illegal in Italy in 2020.

== See also ==
- 3-Chloromethamphetamine
- 3-Chloromethcathinone
