= Cyclopentamine =

Decongestant and stimulant drug

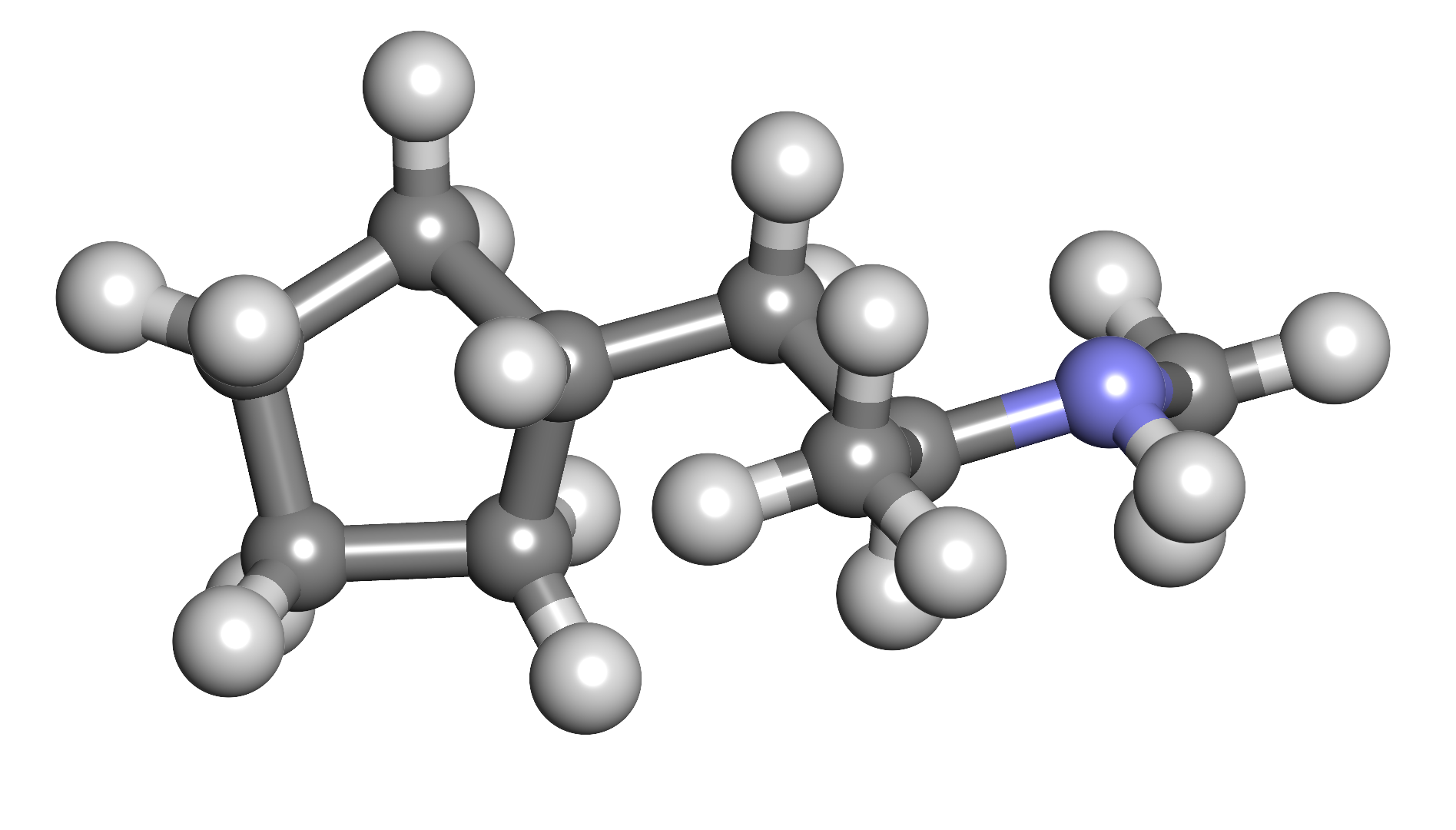

Clinical data
- Other names: N,α-dimethyl-cyclopenaneethylamine
- Routes of administration: Topical (nasal spray)
- ATC code: R01AA02 (WHO)

Legal status
- Legal status: In general: uncontrolled

Identifiers
- IUPAC name: (RS)-1-Cyclopentyl-N-methylpropan-2-amine
- CAS Number: 102-45-4
- PubChem CID: 7608
- DrugBank: DB08999
- ChemSpider: 7326
- UNII: WB9Q6M8O60
- KEGG: D07370
- ChEMBL: ChEMBL329203
- CompTox Dashboard (EPA): DTXSID60861710

Chemical and physical data
- Formula: C_{9}H_{19}N
- Molar mass: 141.258 g·mol^{−1}
- 3D model (JSmol): Interactive image
- Chirality: Racemic mixture
- Boiling point: 171 °C (340 °F)
- SMILES: N(C)C(CC1CCCC1)C
- InChI: InChI=1S/C9H19N/c1-8(10-2)7-9-5-3-4-6-9/h8-10H,3-7H2,1-2H3; Key:HFXKQSZZZPGLKQ-UHFFFAOYSA-N

Cyclopentamine (trade names Clopane, Cyclonarol, Cyclosal, Cyklosan, Nazett, Sinos, among others) is a sympathomimetic and vasoconstrictor drug of the alkylamine family and related to the arylalkylamines. Cyclopentamine was indicated in the past as an over-the-counter (OTC) medication for use as a nasal decongestant, notably in Europe and Australia, but has now been largely discontinued.

== Pharmacology ==
Cyclopentamine acts as a releasing agent of the catecholamine neurotransmitters norepinephrine (noradrenaline), epinephrine (adrenaline), and dopamine. Its effects on norepinephrine and epinephrine mediate its decongestant effects, while its effects on all three neurotransmitters are responsible for its stimulant properties. When ingested orally in sufficient quantities, cyclopentamine produces similar effects to amphetamine, methamphetamine, and propylhexedrine.

== Chemistry ==
Cyclopentamine is the cyclopentane homolog of propylhexedrine, differing only in terms of the contracted ring size of a cyclopentane, containing one —CH_{2}— unit less than the cyclohexyl group.

In terms of the acyclic part of the molecule, both cyclopentamine and propylhexedrine are the same as methamphetamine, all three molecules containing the 2-methylaminopropyl side-chain. The difference between them is that whereas methamphetamine is an aromatic molecule containing a phenyl group, cyclopentamine and propylhexedrine are entirely aliphatic and contain no delocalized electrons at all. The effect that this has on potency is that the reduced alicyclic-alkylamines are weaker than unsaturated (meth)amphetamine.

== See also ==
- Amphetamine
- Cypenamine (which is trans-2-phenylcyclopentylamine)
- Isocyclamine
- Methamphetamine
- Propylhexedrine (also known as cyclohexylisopropylmethylamine)
- Tranylcypromine (which is trans-2-phenylcyclopropylamine)
- Methiopropamine
