= Isocyclamine =

Clinical data
- Other names: α-Methylcyclopentaneethylamine; Cyclopentylisopropylamine; Cyclopentanylaminopropane; Norcyclopentamine

Identifiers
- IUPAC name: 1-cyclopentylpropan-2-amine
- CAS Number: 105-23-7
- PubChem CID: 7743
- ChemSpider: 7457
- UNII: DY4LH10D2X
- CompTox Dashboard (EPA): DTXSID501306640

Chemical and physical data
- Formula: C_{8}H_{17}N
- Molar mass: 127.231 g·mol^{−1}
- 3D model (JSmol): Interactive image
- SMILES: CC(CC1CCCC1)N
- InChI: InChI=1S/C8H17N/c1-7(9)6-8-4-2-3-5-8/h7-8H,2-6,9H2,1H3; Key:JEJKKTYNUKTPTJ-UHFFFAOYSA-N

Isocyclamine, also known as α-methylcyclopentaneethylamine or cyclopentylisopropylamine, is a drug related to amphetamine. It is the N-desmethyl analogue of cyclopentamine and is the analogue of amphetamine in which the phenyl ring has been replaced with a cyclopentane ring.
