= Propylhexedrine =

Topical nasal decongestant

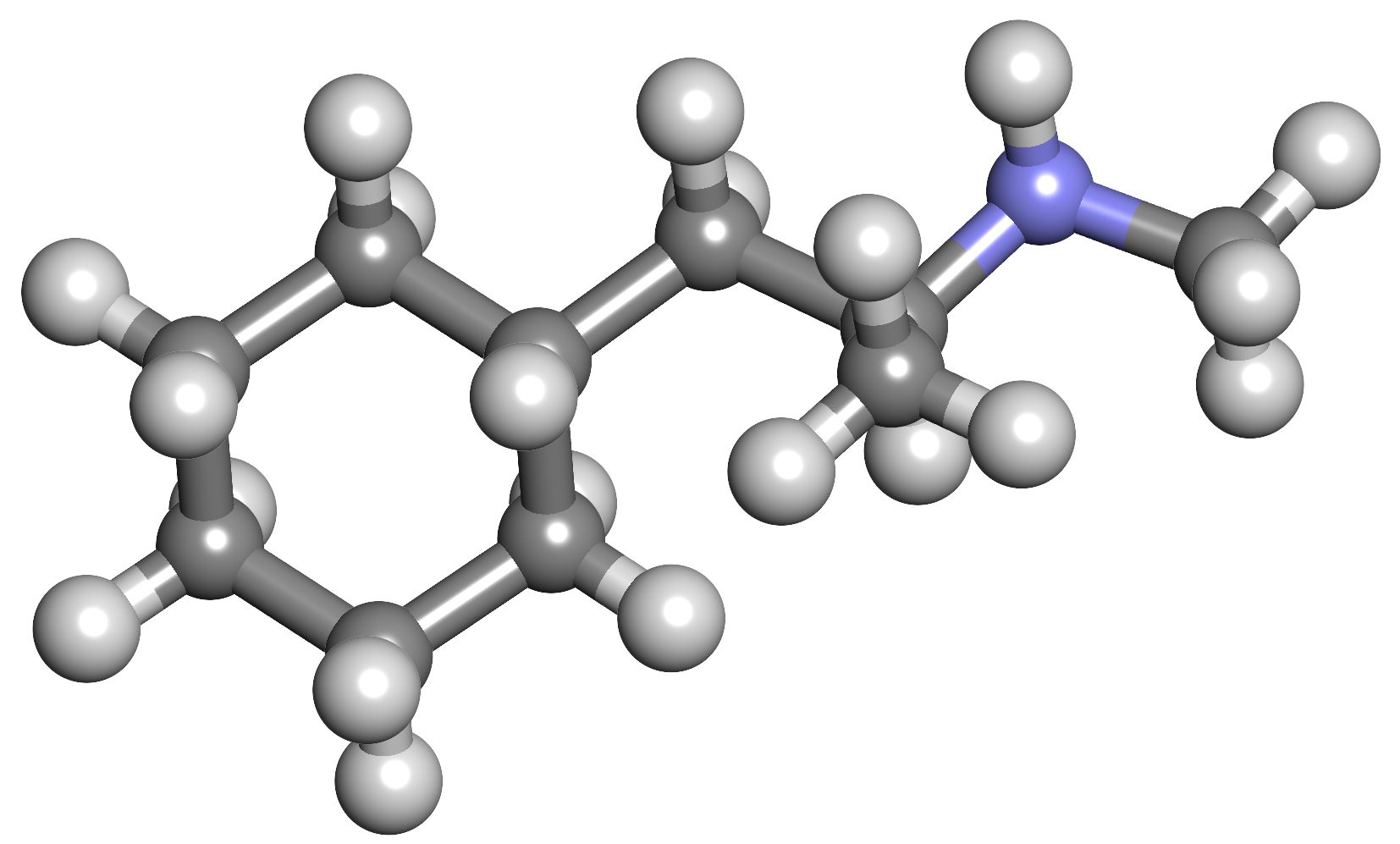

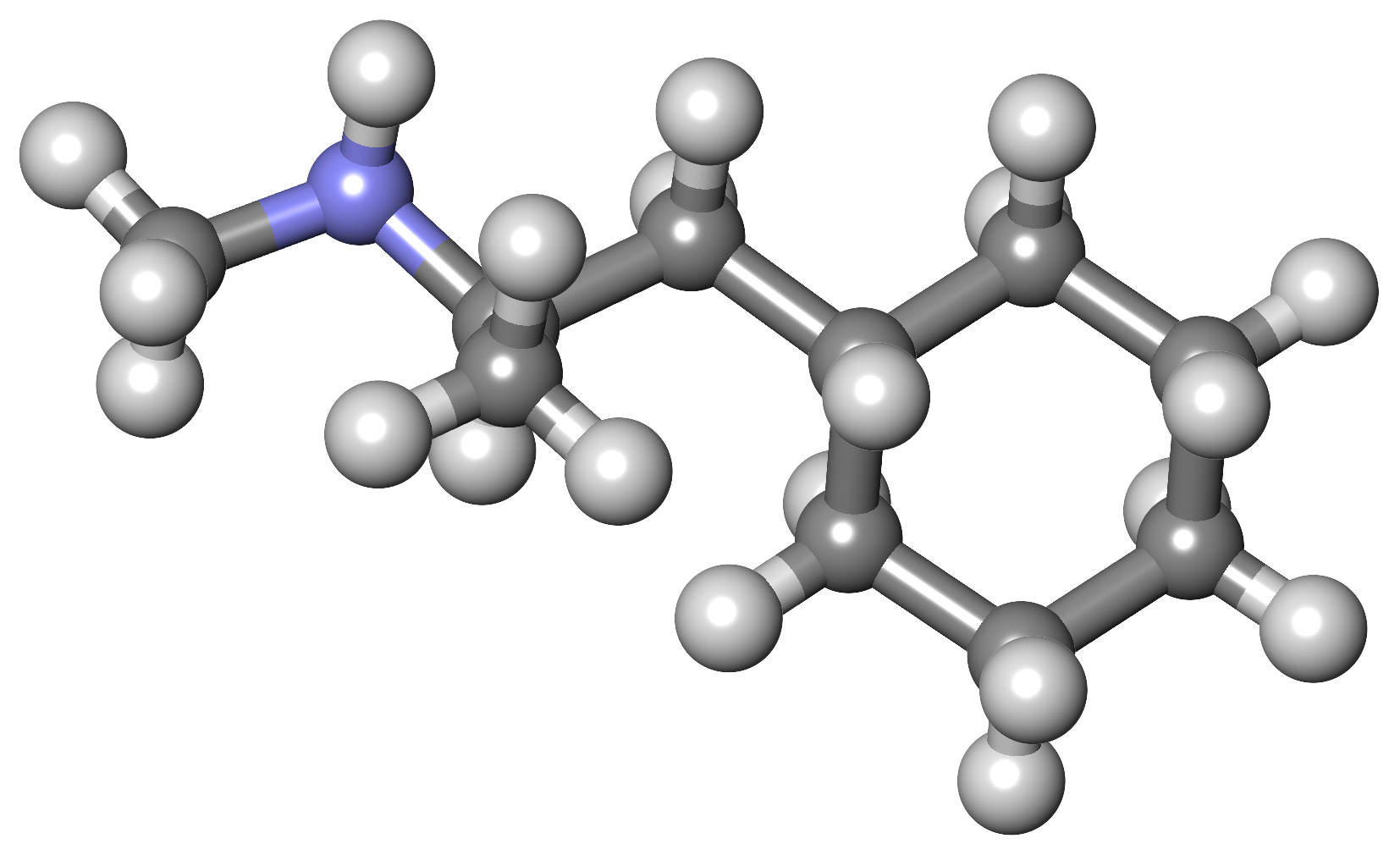
Left: (S)-Propylhexedrine
Right: (R)-Propylhexedrine

Clinical data
- Trade names: Benzedrex, Obesin, Dristan Inhaler, and others
- Other names: 1-cyclohexyl-2-methylaminopropane
- AHFS/Drugs.com: Monograph
- Pregnancy category: C
- Routes of administration: Medical: Intranasal (inhaler); Recreational: Oral, parenteral
- ATC code: N06BA

Legal status
- Legal status: AU: S4 (Prescription only); BR: Class B1 (Psychoactive drugs); CA: Unscheduled; DE: Prescription Only; UK: P (Pharmacy medicines); US: OTC; UN: Unscheduled

Pharmacokinetic data
- Elimination half-life: 4 ± 1.5 hours

Identifiers
- IUPAC name: (±)-1-cyclohexyl-N-methylpropan-2-amine
- CAS Number: 101-40-6; hydrochloride: 1007-33-6
- PubChem CID: 7558
- DrugBank: DB06714
- ChemSpider: 7277
- UNII: LQU92IU8LL; hydrochloride: 064LUN7NZ5
- KEGG: D05637
- CompTox Dashboard (EPA): DTXSID1023526
- ECHA InfoCard: 100.002.673

Chemical and physical data
- Formula: C_{10}H_{21}N
- Molar mass: 155.285 g·mol^{−1}
- 3D model (JSmol): Interactive image
- Chirality: Racemic mixture
- SMILES: N(C(CC1CCCCC1)C)C
- InChI: InChI=1S/C10H21N/c1-9(11-2)8-10-6-4-3-5-7-10/h9-11H,3-8H2,1-2H3; Key:JCRIVQIOJSSCQD-UHFFFAOYSA-N

Propylhexedrine, sold under the brand name Benzedrex among others, is an alkylamine primarily utilized as a topical decongestant. Its main indications are relief of congestion due to colds, allergies, and allergic rhinitis. Propylhexedrine was first used medically in 1949, with the release of Benzedrex by Smith, Kline & French, and it has been used, mainly within the United States, since then.

== Medical use ==
Propylhexedrine is used to treat acute nasal congestion related to the common cold, allergies, and hay fever. For nasal congestion, the dosage is listed as four inhalations (two inhalations per nostril) every two hours for adults and children 6–12 years of age. Each inhalation delivers 0.4 to 0.5 mg (400 to 500 μg) in 800 mL of air. Use is not to exceed three days.

Historically, it has also been used for weight loss in oral tablet preparations at a dose of 25 mg. No medications containing propylhexedrine are currently approved for weight loss in any country since roughly 1976.

== Contraindications ==
Propylhexedrine should not be used if a MAOI has been used in the past 14 days or is currently in use by a person.

Unlike other topical decongestants, propylhexedrine is not required to carry a warning against use in individuals with hypertension.

Propylhexedrine is not recommended in individuals younger than six years of age. There is at least one case of reported accidental poisoning resulting from child access to a propylhexedrine product.

== Adverse effects ==
When used as an inhaler, the most common adverse effects warned about for propylhexedrine are temporary discomfort (e.g., stinging or burning sensations) or rebound congestion. The sharing of propylhexedrine inhalers may spread infection. The occurrence of these adverse effects is uncommon as propylhexedrine is generally recognized as safe and effective. However, the use of propylhexedrine products in manners not intended by their labeling can result in severe adverse effects not typically encountered in therapeutic settings. The outcomes of improperly using propylhexedrine products can include hospitalization, disability, or even death. Public health agencies such as the Food and Drug Administration (FDA) have advised propylhexedrine products only be used in the manners directed on their label.

== Overdose ==
Reports of overdoses from propylhexedrine have been documented, but they are uncommon. Most instances of overdoses attributed to propylhexedrine have been the result of improper use of a propylhexedrine product in a manner not intended by its labeling for (non-medical) recreational purposes. As noted by the FDA, the most common symptoms of propylhexedrine overdose are the following: "[r]apid heart rate, agitation, high blood pressure, chest pain, tremor, hallucinations, delusions, confusion, nausea, and vomiting." The use of propylhexedrine products in manners inconsistent with their labeling has proven fatal in some cases. Propylhexedrine products are considered to be safe and effective if used as intended. Regardless, medical attention should be sought in the case of suspected overdose.

== Interactions ==
Most of propylhexedrine's interactions with other medications have to do with its ability to constrict blood vessels. Propylhexedrine's most serious interaction is with monoamine oxidase inhibitors (MAOIs), which are contraindicated. Monoamine oxidase inhibitors are used, albeit uncommonly, as an antidepressant. Nonetheless, caution should be exercised when administering propylhexedrine concurrently with other medicines.

== Pharmacology ==
=== Mechanism of action ===
Propylhexedrine works mainly as an adrenergic agonist, when used at therapeutic doses in an inhaler dosage form. This restricts the blood vessels in the nose and reduces swelling; thereby, it relieves nasal congestion. At higher doses, propylhexedrine affects the central nervous system as a norepinephrine–dopamine releasing agent (NDRA). Propylhexedrine likely exerts such effects in a manner similar to related alkylamines such as cyclopentamine, methylhexanamine, and tuaminoheptane. Propylhexedrine also exhibits antihypotensive effects.

=== Pharmacokinetics ===
Metabolism of propylhexedrine

Propylhexedrine undergoes metabolism via N-demethylation, C-oxidation, N-oxidation, dehydrogenation, and hydrolysis to form various metabolites such as norpropylhexedrine, cyclohexylacetoxime, cyclohexylacetone, and 4-hydroxypropylhexedrine.

== Chemistry ==
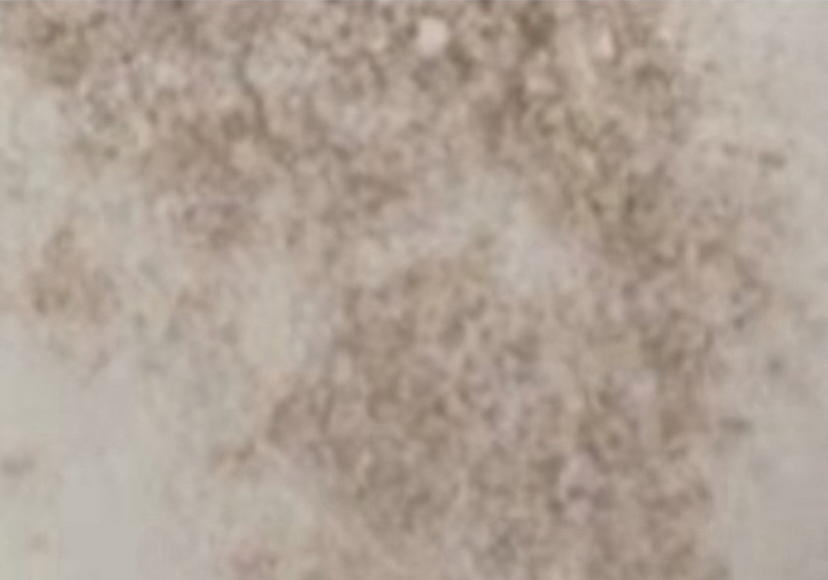
Hydrochloride salt of propylhexedrine. The off-brown color gives rise to the slang term for this salt: "peanut butter".

Freebase propylhexedrine is a volatile, oily liquid at room temperature. The slow evaporation of freebase propylhexedrine allows it to be administered via inhalation. The evaporation of the freebase also accounts for the limited shelf-life of propylhexedrine inhalers. Many of the salts of propylhexedrine are stable, clear to off-white crystalline substances that readily dissolve in water.

Propylhexedrine is similar in chemical structure to phenylethylamines. Phenylethylamines and substituted phenethylamines are found in the core of many trace amines and sympathomimetic drugs. The main difference is the presence of an alicyclic cyclohexyl group instead of the aromatic phenyl group of a phenethylamine.

Propylhexedrine is a chiral compound. The active ingredient contained in Benzedrex inhalers is racemic (RS)-propylhexedrine as the free base. (S)-Propylhexedrine, also known as levopropylhexedrine, is the more biologically active isomer of the two. The dextrorotatory counterpart, which is mainly unused, is dextropropylhexedrine.

=== Synthesis ===
Propylhexedrine can be synthesized from cyclohexylacetone through the reductive amination of an intermediary imine over an aluminum-mercury amalgam in the presence of a hydrogen source.

However, propylhexedrine is more commonly prepared by the catalytic hydrogenation of methamphetamine over Adams' catalyst. This transforms methamphetamine's phenyl ring to a cyclohexyl moiety.

The selective synthesis of enantiopure levopropylhexedrine can be accomplished through the initial Wenker synthesis of an intermediate aziridine followed by catalytic hydrogenation.

=== Detection in bodily fluids ===
Administration of propylhexedrine can lead to false positives for phenethylamine derivatives on urinalysis panels. Propylhexedrine can be differentiated upon further analysis.

== History ==
Propylhexedrine's medical use as a decongestant evolved from desires to find safer alternatives to previous agents. After searching for such an agent, Dr. Glenn E. Ullyot patented propylhexedrine as a decongestant in 1948. This patent was issued for benefit of Smith, Kline & French. Before it was sold nationally in the United States, propylhexedrine underwent market trials in California. These market trials began on July 15, 1949. Propylhexedrine (under the brand name Benzedrex) was first introduced into commerce on August 4, 1949.

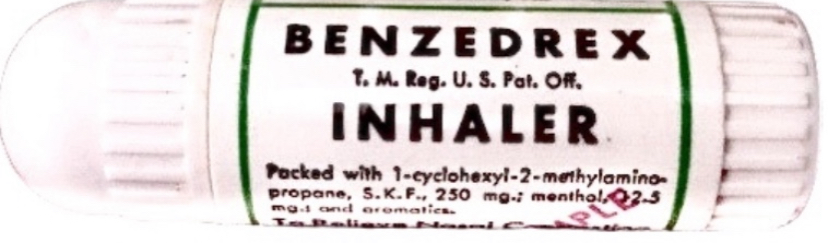
An early Benzedrex inhaler, c. 1950s manufactured by Smith, Kline & French that includes the synonym "1-cyclohexyl-2-methylaminopropane"

Approval for use in the United Kingdom soon followed in 1956. Later, approval for use in Canada was granted in 1998. In 2023, B. F. Ascher & Co. decreased the amount of propylhexedrine in the Benzedrex inhaler from its historic 250 milligrams down to 175 milligrams.

Barbexaclone, an anticonvulsant containing propylhexedrine, was used in Turkey until its withdrawal from the market in 2009. Barbexaclone's former niche in Turkish medicine is now largely occupied by levetiracetam.

== Manufacturing ==
The manufacture of propylhexedrine products for therapeutic use is typically performed based on guidelines established in government regulations and pharmacopeia monographs.

The illicit manufacture or diversion of propylhexedrine by clandestine chemists for use as a recreational drug has been documented in academic literature. Similar to when opioids are manufactured clandestinely for recreational use, it is unlikely that propylhexedrine produced by clandestine chemists adheres to the standards for purity, identity, and strength required of therapeutic products.

== Society and culture ==
=== Legal status ===
==== International control ====
Propylhexedrine was placed under international control by the Convention on Psychotropic Substances in 1985. This action was reversed in 1991.

==== Australia ====
Propylhexedrine is an S4 substance in Australia.

==== Brazil ====
Propylhexedrine is a Class B1 substance in Brazil.

==== Canada ====
Propylhexedrine was formerly a Schedule V substance in Canada. In 2022, this status changed and propylhexedrine has since been removed from control under the Controlled Drugs and Substances Act.

==== Germany ====
Propylhexedrine is regulated as a prescription medicine in Germany. Initially, propylhexedrine products were available over-the-counter. However, this changed in the 1970s and propylhexedrine is now regulated as a prescription product in Germany.

==== United Kingdom ====
Propylhexedrine was formerly a Class C substance in the United Kingdom, but was deregulated in 1995. Propylhexedrine was used recreationally during a brief period in the 1970s after increased government regulation on earlier decongestants.

==== United States ====
On the 4th of April 1988, propylhexedrine was designated a controlled substance (Schedule V) in the United States. This was done to satisfy U.S. compliance with an international treaty. However, in 1991, this action was reversed and propylhexedrine was removed from control under the Controlled Substances Act. This was based on the opinion of the Drug Enforcement Administration that propylhexedrine did not warrant control. The substance has remained unregulated under the Controlled Substances Act in the United States ever since. Furthermore, pursuant to DEA regulations, certain Benzedrex inhalers are specifically exempt from the Controlled Substances Act. Propylhexedrine remains regulated under the laws of several U.S. states. These states include the states of Alaska, Arizona, Florida, Georgia, Idaho, Kansas, and Rhode Island.

=== Recreational use ===
Multiple public health agencies (most notably within the United States) have warned against the recreational use of propylhexedrine and advised for its use only as directed by a product's labeling; nonetheless it has been reported, through the literature as early as 1959, that propylhexedrine products have been used for recreational purposes. Recreational use is potentially fatal, its risks are magnified when administering the substance through injection means, and the adverse effects of recreational propylhexedrine are more severe when compared to related substances. The undesirable side effects of propylhexedrine at recreational doses are less tolerable compared to other substances that produce similar effects; consequently, propylhexedrine is less desirable for recreational use. The fact that propylhexedrine is less potent than comparable substances has also limited recreational use. Even in areas with prevalent substance use, the use of propylhexedrine was reported as non-significant; nonetheless, the recreational use of nasal decongestant, anorectic, and anticonvulsant preparations of propylhexedrine has been reported. The recreational use of propylhexedrine products has been on the rise since the early 2000s.

In 2021, the Food and Drug Administration (FDA) issued the following warning in regard to recreational use of propylhexedrine products in manners inconsistent with their labeling:

...[T]he abuse and misuse of the over-the-counter (OTC) nasal decongestant propylhexedrine can lead to serious harm such as heart and mental health problems. Some of these complications, which include fast or abnormal heart rhythm, high blood pressure, and paranoia, can lead to hospitalization, disability, or death....Propylhexedrine is safe and effective when used as directed.

That same year, the Indian Health Service issued the following statement in reference to the recreational use of propylhexedrine products:

Only use propylhexedrine according to the instructions on the package label. Do not use it in ways other than inhalation. Seek medical attention immediately [...] by calling [emergency services] or Poison Control [...] for anyone using propylhexedrine who experiences [any of the following:] [s]evere anxiety or agitation, confusion, hallucinations, or paranoia[,] [r]apid heartbeat or abnormal heart rhythm[,] [or] [c]hest pain or tightness[.]

A year later, in 2022, the U.S. Army published the following guidance on propylhexedrine. The guidance states that recreational use of propylhexedrine is not permissible by service-members, can open its participants up to disciplinary action, and carries potentially fatal risks:

When disciplining a member for suspected use of any drug, it is important to consult [legal counsel] on how to proceed, [according to the Office of Drug Demand Reduction] [...] This is especially important when the evidence supporting discipline consists of scientific reports and data that may require special assistance in their interpretation. In cases involving [propylhexedrine], legal consultation is highly recommended.

Put briefly, the Food and Drug Administration, Indian Health Service, and United States Army all advise individuals not to use propylhexedrine products for recreational purposes.

=== Economics ===
Propylhexedrine, under the brand name Benzedrex, is sold online by retailers such as Amazon, eBay, and Walmart. Propylhexedrine has been sold in some countries as an anorectic or as part of an anticonvulsant preparation; however, such products are not sold freely to consumers and require a physician's prescription.

=== Brand names ===
==== Benzedrex inhaler ====
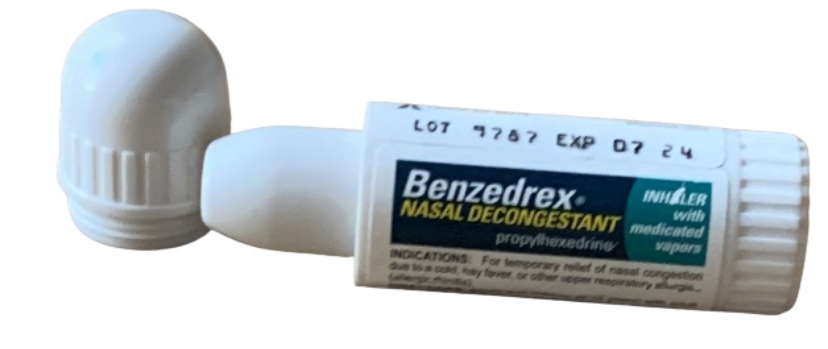
Benzedrex inhaler, c. 2023, manufactured by B. F. Ascher & Co.

Propylhexedrine, as a nasal decongestant, is currently marketed under the brand name Benzedrex. The name was initially trademarked by Smith, Kline & French in 1944. The brand was passed onto Menley James Laboratories (through a subsidiary, NuMark Laboratories) in 1990, and was finally acquired by B. F. Ascher & Co. in 1998.

==== Dristan inhaler ====
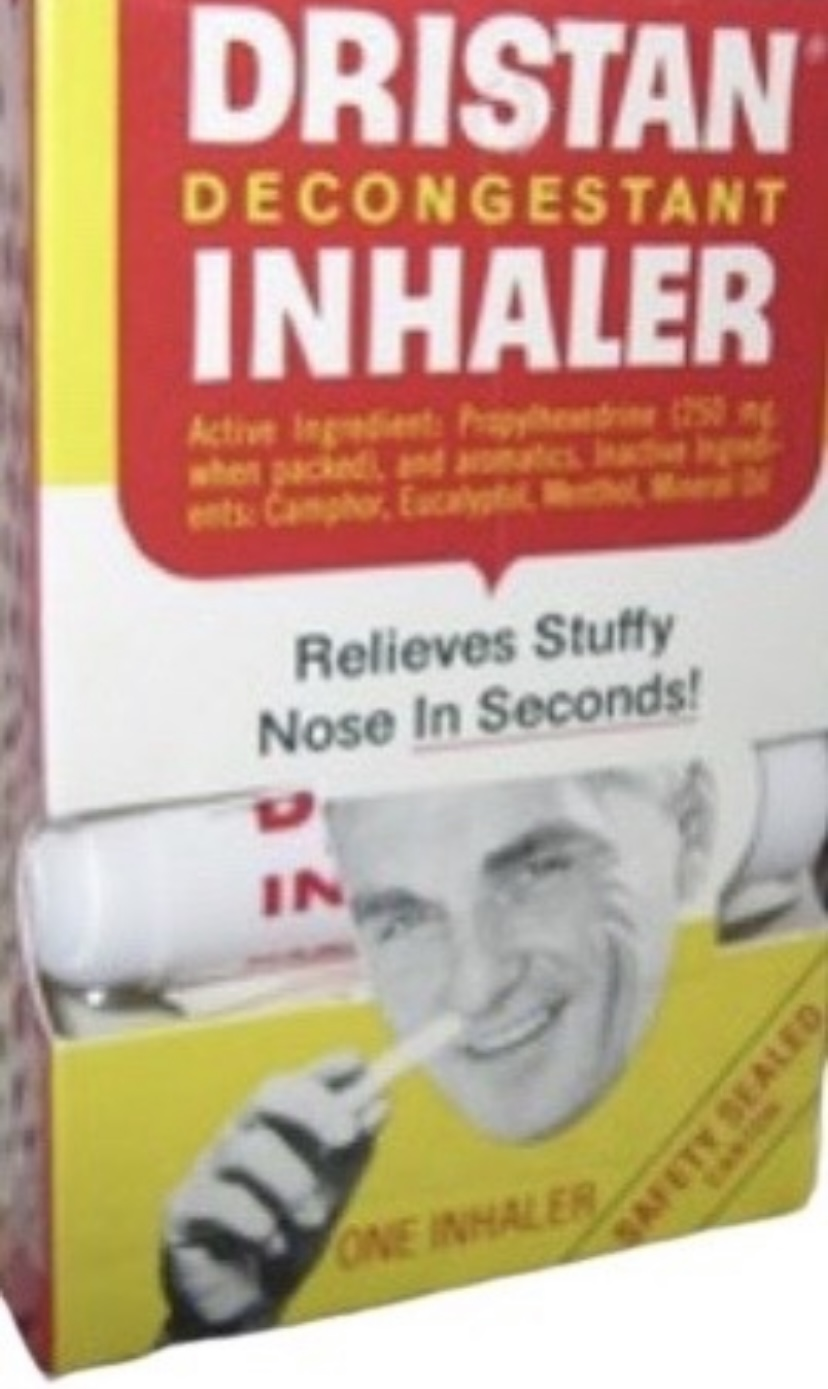
Dristan-brand inhaler, c. 1966 manufactured by Whitehall Laboratories

Propylhexedrine was also sold in inhaler form by Whitehall Laboratories (Wyeth) under the Dristan brand name as an inhaler. In January 1966, propylhexedrine replaced mephentermine as the active ingredient in the product. The Dristan inhaler has since been discontinued. Furthermore, Wyeth was acquired by Pfizer in 2009. All products currently sold under the Dristan brand are manufactured by Foundation Consumer Brands; Foundation Consumer Brands acquired the Dristan brand in 2020. Foundation Consumer Brands is itself owned by Kelso & Company.

==== Obesin ====
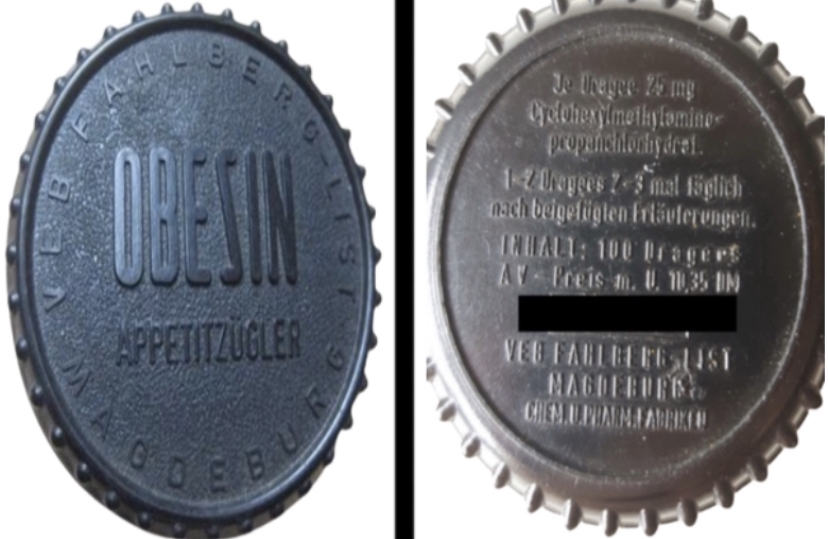
Obesin pill tin, c. 1974 manufactured by Fahlberg-List

Propylhexedrine has also seen use in Europe as an appetite suppressant, under the brand name Obesin. Obesin has been referenced in literature dating back to the 1950s. Obesin was manufactured by Fahlberg-List in East Germany from 1958 to around 1976. The discontinuation of Obesin was the result of increased regulatory restrictions on over-the-counter anorectics. These restrictions began to be imposed in 1974. Fahlberg-List itself dissolved in 1995.

==== Maliasin ====
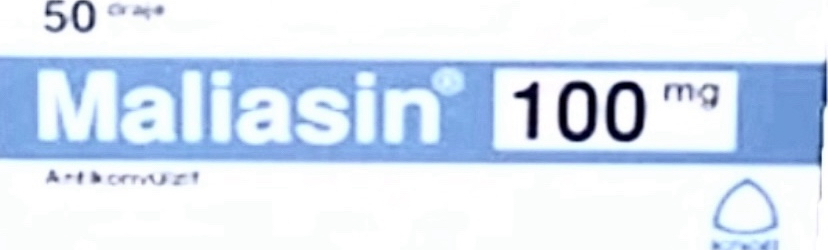
Maliasin (Barbexaclone) carton, c. 2002 manufactured by Knoll Pharmaceuticals

Propylhexedrine (in the form of levopropylhexedrine) is a component in the anticonvulsant preparation barbexaclone. It is included for the purpose of offsetting the barbiturate-induced sedation from phenobarbital. Barbexaclone has been known under the brand name of Maliasin, manufactured by Abbott Laboratories, as early as 1965. Maliasin has also been manufactured by Knoll Pharmaceuticals; Knoll is a company acquired by Abbott Laboratories. In 2010, Abbott discontinued sale of its barbexaclone preparation in many countries.

==== Eventin ====
Levopropylhexedrine has been used as an appetite suppressant under the brand name Eventin. Eventin's use has been documented as early as 1958.
