= List of psychedelic pharmaceutical companies =

This is a list of pharmaceutical companies that are developing psychedelic drugs and/or related drugs such as entactogens, other hallucinogens, or non-hallucinogenic variants (e.g., psychoplastogens) for potential medical use. This list also includes individual drug candidates and compounds of psychedelic pharmaceutical companies.

== Modern ==
- AbbVie – bretisilocin (GM-2505, 5-F-MET; acquired from Gilgamesh Pharmaceuticals)
- Akome Biotech – AKO-001 (DMT combination), AKO-002 (psilocybin combination), AKO-003 (ketamine combination), AKO-004 (DMT combination)
- Alexander Shulgin Research Institute (ASRI) – ASR-2001 (2CB-5PrO), ASR-3001 (5-MeO-iPALT)
- Algernon NeuroScience – DMT (AP-188)
- Alvarius Pharmaceuticals – 5-MeO-DMT (mebufotenin)
- Amandala Neuro – psilocin (ELE-101)
- Apex Labs – psilocybin (APEX-52/90)
- Arcadia Medicine – non-racemic MDMA (AM-1002), AM-1004, AM-1006
- Ariadne Bio (subsidiary of Negev Labs) – AB-300
- Atai Life Sciences (merged with Beckley Psytech) – DMT (VLS-01), (R)-MDMA (EMP-01), ibogaine (IBX-210, DMX-1002), EGX-121, inidascamine (RL-007), EGX-A, EGX-B, arketamine (PCN-101)
- AtaiBeckley (merger of Atai Life Sciences and Beckley Psytech; acquired by Eli Lilly and Company) – 5-MeO-DMT (mebufotenin, BPL-003), DMT (VLS-01), (R)-MDMA (EMP-01)
- Awakn Life Sciences (acquired by Solvonis Therapeutics) – ketamine (AWKN-001), MDMA (midomafetamine), esketamine (AWKN-002)
- Beckley Psytech (merged with Atai Life Sciences) – 5-MeO-DMT (mebufotenin, BPL-003), psilocin (ELE-01)
- BetterLife Pharma – 2-bromo-LSD (BETR-001, TD-0148A)
- Biomind Labs – DMT (BMND-01–03), DMT (Triptax), 5-MeO-DMT (mebufotenin, BMND-05/08), BMND007 (DMT or 5-MeO-DMT combination), mescaline (BMND-04/06/09), ibogaine
- Bright Minds Biosciences – BMB-101, BMB-105, BMB-201, BMB-202, Pharm-136
- CaaMTech – CT-4201 (psilocin prodrug), TN-001 (via spinout Transneural Therapeutics), TN-002 (via spinout Transneural Therapeutics)
- Ceruvia Lifesciences – psilocybin (SYNP-101), 2-bromo-LSD (NYPRG-101)
- Clearmind Medicine – MEAI (CMND-100), 2-FDCK, 3-MMC
- Clexio Biosciences – esketamine (CLE-100)
- Compass Pathways – psilocybin (COMP360)
- Definium Therapeutics (Mind Medicine, MindMed) – LSD (DT120, MM120), (R)-MDMA (MM402), zolunicant (18-MC, MM110), ketanserin (neutralizer), MDMA (midomafetamine), lys-MDA
- Delix Therapeutics – ibogainalog, tabernanthalog (DLX-007), zalsupindole (DLX-001, AAZ-A-154), DLX-159, DLX-2270, DLX-0002700, JRT
- DemeRx – ibogaine (IBX-210), noribogaine (DMX-1001)
- Diamond Therapeutics – psilocybin
- Eleusis (acquired by Beckley Psytech) – psilocybin (ELE-101, ELE-Psilo), ELE-01 (a phenethylamine), 2C-iBu (ELE-02), ketamine (ELE-Ket)
- EmpathBio – (R)-MDMA (EMP-01)
- Engrail Therapeutics – ENX-105, ENX-205
- Entheon Biomedical – DMT (EBRX-101)
- Entropy Neurodynamics – psilocybin (TRP-8802), psilocin (TRP-8803)
- Enveric Biosciences – EB-002 (EB-373; psilocin prodrug), EB-003
- Equulus Therapeutics – EQL-101 (ibogaine analogue)
- Filament Health – psilocybin (PEX010)
- Freedom Biosciences – ketamine/temsirolimus (FREE001)
- GH Research – 5-MeO-DMT (mebufotenin, GH001–003)
- Gilgamesh Pharmaceuticals – bretisilocin (GM-2505, 5-F-MET), blixeprodil ((R)-4-FDCK, GM-1020), GM-3009 (an oxa-iboga), GM-5022, GM-2040, oxa-noribogaine, 4-allyl-6-oxa-noribogainalog
- Helus Pharma (Cybin) – deupsilocin (psilocin-d10; HLP003, CYB003), deudimethyltryptamine (DMT-d10; HLP004, CYB004), HLP005 (CYB005), 2C-T-36 (CYB210010), DMT (SPL026), SPL028 (D_{2}-DMT)
- Incannex Healthcare – psilocybin (PSX-001)
- Johnson & Johnson – esketamine (Spravato), ITI-1549 (via acquiring Intra-Cellular Therapies)
- Journey Colab – mescaline (JOUR-5700)
- Ketabon – oral prolonged-release ketamine (KET01)
- Küleon Bioscience (Psilosterics) – KB-128
- Lophora – LPH-5 ((S)-2C-TFM-3PIP), LPH-48
- Lucid Psycheceuticals – Lucid-PSYCH (Lucid-201)
- Lusaris Therapeutics – 5-MeO-DMT (mebufotenin)
- MiHKAL – lys-MDA, SDA, SDMA
- MindBio Therapeutics – LSD (MB-22001)
- Mindset Pharma (acquired by Otsuka Pharmaceutical) – MSP-1014 (psilocin prodrug), MSP-2020, MSP-4018, MSP-4019, MSP-4020
- Mindstate Design Labs – 5-MeO-MiPT (MSD-001), 5-MeO-MiPT combinations (e.g., MSD-101, MSD-201, etc.)
- MSICS Pharma – psilocybin (MSX-06)
- Multidisciplinary Association for Psychedelic Studies (MAPS) – MDMA (midomafetamine)
- MycoMedica Life Sciences – psilocybin (MLS101)
- Mydecine – psilocybin (MYCO-001/003), MYCO-006, MYCO-007, MYCO-002, MYCO-004, MYCO-005
- Negev Labs – HBL20016 (5-MeS-6-F-DMT), HBL20017 (4-F-5-MeS-DMT)
- Neurala Biosciences – DMT/harmala alkaloids (NBX-100, NBX-200)
- Neurocentrx Pharma – misuse-deterrant oral ketamine (NRCx-201)
- Ninnion Therapeutics – NIN-S119 (a tryptamine)
- Nobilis Therapeutics – xenon (NBTX-001)
- NRx Pharmaceuticals – ketamine (NRX-100)
- Otsuka Pharmaceutical – acquired Mindset Pharma and Transcend Therapeutics and of all their drug candidates
- PharmAla Biotech – racemic MDMA (LaNeo), non-racemic MDMA (ALA-002), MBDB, APA-01 (PharmAla-1)
- Pilz Bioscience – psilocin (PLZ-1015), baeocystin (PLZ-1019), norpsilocin (PLZ-1017)
- Psilera – DMT, PSIL-001, PSIL-002, PSIL-006, PSIL-020, PSIL-025, 4-AcO-DMT
- PsyBio Therapeutics – psilocybin (PB-1818), norbaeocystin
- Psychae Therapeutics – DMT/β-carboline
- Psyence Biomedical (Psyence BioMed) – [natural] psilocybin
- Reconnect Labs – dimethyltryptamine/harmine (RE01), sublingual 5-MeO-DMT (mebufotenin; RE02)
- Relmada Therapeutics – psilocybin (REL-P11)
- Reset Pharma – psilocybin (RSTP-1000)
- Resilient Pharmaceuticals (Lykos Pharmaceuticals, MAPS Public Benefit Corporation) – MDMA (midomafetamine)
- Reunion Neuroscience (Field Trip Health) – luvesilocin (RE104, FT104, 4-GO-DiPT), RE109 (FT109, 4-GO-DMT), RE245
- Revive Therapeutics – psilocybin (PSY-0.1–0.6)
- Scottsdale Research Institute – psilocybin-containing mushrooms
- Seaport Therapeutics – SPT-348 (2-bromo-LSD prodrug)
- Seelos Therapeutics – ketamine (Ereska, PMI-100, PMI-150, SLS-002, TUR-002)
- Sensorium Therapeutics – SNTX-2643 (SENS-01; kanna derivative)
- Small Pharma (acquired by Cybin/Helus Pharma) – DMT (SPL026), SPL028 (D_{2}-DMT)
- Solvonis Therapeutics – ketamine (SVN-001), esketamine (SVN-002), SVN-114 (SVN-SDN-14 series), SVN-015
- Soneira Bio – ibogaine/magnesium (SON-001)
- Tactogen – MDMA/citalopram, TACT411, TACT523, TACT833, TACT908, 1Z2MAP1O, 1ZP2MA
- Tasman Therapeutics (spinout of Douglas Pharmaceuticals) – oral extended-release ketamine (R-107)
- Terran Biosciences – eplivanserin/volinanserin (trip killer/blocker)
- Transcend Therapeutics (acquired by Otsuka Pharmaceutical) – methylone (MDMC, TSND-201)
- Transneural Therapeutics (a spinout of CaaMTech) – TN-001, TN-002
- Tryp Therapeutics – psilocybin (PFN, TRP-8802–8804, TRYP-0082)
- Usona Institute – psilocybin, 5-MeO-DMT (mebufotenin), bufotenin (5-HO-DMT)
- Xylo (Psylo) – XYL-1001 (PSYLO-1001), XYL-1002 (PSYLO-1002), XYL-3001 (PSYLO-3001), XYL-4001 (PSYLO-4001), XYL-5001 (PSYLO-5001)

== Historical ==
- Bristol-Myers Company (Bristol Laboratories) – (R)-Ariadne ((R)-4C-DOM, BL-3912A, Dimoxamine)
- Dow Chemical Company – DOM (K-61,082), DOET
- Merck – MDMA, mescaline
- Sandoz – LSD (LSD-25, lysergide, Delysid), psilocybin (CY-39, Indocybin), psilocin (CX-59), ethocybin (CEY-19), 4-HO-DET (ethocin; CZ-74), 4-HO-AMT (MP-14), 4-Me-AMT (MP-809), others
- Smith, Kline & French – MDA (SKF-5, Amphedoxamine), 3-APBT (SKF-6678)
- Soviet Union – α-methyltryptamine (AMT, Indopan)
- Upjohn – α-ethyltryptamine (AET, etryptamine, Monase)

== See also ==
- List of investigational hallucinogens and entactogens
- List of psychedelic chemists
- List of psychedelic news and media organizations
- List of psychedelic conferences
- List of psychedelic drugs
- Psychedelic Alpha
