= Psychedelic treatments for trauma-related disorders =

Psychedelic treatments for trauma-related disorders are the use of psychedelic substances, either alone or used in conjunction with psychotherapy, to treat trauma-related disorders. Trauma-related disorders, such as post-traumatic stress disorder (PTSD), have a lifetime prevalence of around 8% in the US population. However, even though trauma-related disorders can hinder the everyday life of individuals with them, less than 50% of patients who meet criteria for PTSD diagnosis receive proper treatment. Psychotherapy is an effective treatment for trauma-related disorders. A meta-analysis of treatment outcomes has shown that 67% of patients who completed treatment for PTSD no longer met diagnostic criteria for PTSD. For those seeking evidence-based psychotherapy treatment, it is estimated that 22-24% will drop out of their treatment. In addition to psychotherapy, pharmacotherapy (medication) is an option for treating PTSD; however, research has found that pharmacotherapy is only effective for about 59% of patients. Although both forms of treatment are effective for many patients, high dropout rates of psychotherapy and treatment-resistant forms of PTSD have led to increased research in other possible forms of treatment. One such form is the use of psychedelics.

== Psychedelic treatments for trauma-related disorders ==
Psychedelics such as lysergic acid diethylamide (LSD) and psilocybin have been researched and used as treatments in the United States of America for mental disorders as early as 1947. However, the research and use of psychedelics for treatment were halted in 1970 with the passing of the Controlled Substance Act of the Comprehensive Drug Abuse Prevention and Control Act. Even though the research was hindered for many decades, there has been a renewed interest in the use of psychedelics to help with the treatment of trauma-related disorders from many organizations, with one of the most well known being the Multidisciplinary Association for Psychedelic Studies (MAPS). In 2017, both 3,4-Methylenedioxymethamphetamine (MDMA) and Psilocybin were given the status of breakthrough therapies by the US Food and Drug Administration (FDA) and allowed for clinical trials of both substances use in psychedelic treatments of mental disorders. In 2019, the FDA approved ketamine for use in treatment as well. Currently, three of the most common psychedelic drugs researched are MDMA, psilocybin, ketamine. Each substance has different rationales for treatment and various treatment methods.

== 3,4-Methylenedioxymethamphetamine (MDMA) ==
MDMA was first synthesized by Merck & Co. in 1912. Designed initially as a blood-clotting agent, it was found to have psychotropic properties. Although the drug was found not to be an effective blood clotting medication, it was later resynthesized by the chemist Alexander Shulgin in 1976. The drug grew in popularity in the 1980s because of its psychotropic properties and ability to facilitate and alter emotional states. MDMA is most commonly known by its street name, ecstasy. Currently, MDMA is classified as a Schedule I drug in the United States, meaning it is viewed as having no accepted medical use and has a high potential for abuse.

=== Therapeutic rationale ===
The primary rationale behind the use of MDMA in conjunction with psychotherapy is that MDMA can help facilitate talk therapy by reducing fear and anxiety around traumatic memories and makes the processing of those memories more tolerable. MDMA has been shown to increase emotional empathy and compassion for self and others, increase prosocial behaviors, increase subjective ratings of closeness and trust of others, and increase introspection. These potential benefits of MDMA usage can help the therapist during talk therapy address the traumatic events suffered by patients. MDMA is also known to decrease fear around memories and increase fear extinction of traumatic memories. Lastly, MDMA helps reduce the activation of the amygdala (associated with an increase in fear) and increases the activation of the frontal cortex (associated with better processing and control) when retrieving memories.

=== Treatment procedure ===
Most MDMA-assisted psychotherapy treatments start with the administration of MDMA orally, with initial doses ranging from 75 to 125 mg. After one to two hours, a second dose of half the initial dose is offered to patients. During these sessions, patients are encouraged to alternate between introspection periods and talking with the therapist. Usually, two therapists accompany each patient while under the influence of MDMA and help facilitate introspection and encourage remembering and processing the traumatic events. Patients are given time to relax and listen to music to help induce periods of introspection. Therapy sessions last 6 to 8 hours and usually end when the drug's effects on the patients return to baseline. Patients are monitored and stay the night at the clinic and can leave the following day. Three integration sessions where patients can discuss the experience of the MDMA session, process emotions, and receives psychoeducation are held the morning after or shortly after the MDMA session. In most cases, the process of MDMA sessions followed by the integration sessions is repeated three times, usually a month apart.

=== Evidence of effectiveness ===
In multiple trials, MDMA-assisted psychotherapy has been shown to significantly reduce PTSD symptoms after treatment, with patients reporting quality of life improvements in addition to trauma-related symptom reduction.

== Psilocybin ==
Psilocybin is the chemical commonly found in a variety of mushrooms. Although it has been used for centuries by the native people of Central and South America, they were not fully introduced to the United States until the 1950s. Commonly referred to as "magic mushrooms," the compound of Psilocybin was successfully synthesized by Roger Heim and Albert Hofmann and no longer requires mushrooms to be produced. Psilocybin can cause sensory perception changes such as auditory and visual illusions. Currently, Psilocybin is classified as a Schedule I drug in the United States.

=== Therapeutic rationale ===
The main rationale behind using Psilocybin combined with psychotherapy is that Psilocybin is shown to increase fear extinction around emotions and increase emotional empathy. Much like MDMA, the effects of Psilocybin have been shown to help therapists during talk therapy. Psilocybin has been shown to increase emotional empathy, creative thinking, mindfulness, and insightfulness in patients, which can help the therapist work with the client to overcome their trauma. Also, like MDMA, Psilocybin has been shown to decrease amygdala activation during emotional processing. Most treatments using Psilocybin are focused on reducing depression and anxiety, which are common co-morbid diagnoses with trauma-related disorders and share many similar symptoms (i.e., anhedonia, sleep disturbance, negative cognitions, feelings of guilt and shame).

=== Treatment procedure ===
Psilocybin treatments start with orally administering 10 to 25 mg of Psilocybin. Much like a session with MDMA, Psilocybin-assisted psychotherapy sessions are non-directive. They alternate between periods of allowing the patient to relax, listen to music, and look introspectively and periods of talking with the therapist. Shortly after the Psilocybin session, usually the following day, an integration follow-up psychotherapy session is done with the patient to discuss the experience and provide psychotherapy. The goal of these integration sessions is to help process emotions, process the traumatic event, provide psychoeducation, and address concerns of the treatment. Two more psychotherapy sessions follow this in the next weeks. After the three follow-up sessions, there is a second Psilocybin session, followed by three more integration sessions.

=== Effectiveness ===
There is only weak evidence psilocybin may be useful for treating PTSD.

== Ketamine ==
Ketamine is a useful anesthetic and is widely used throughout the world. First synthesized in 1962 and later approved for use as an anesthetic in 1970, Ketamine has dissociative psychedelic effects. In addition to these effects, Ketamine is a fast-acting antidepressant. In the United States, Ketamine is classified as a Schedule III drug, meaning it is considered substantially safe and can be used for medical purposes under pharmacist management.

=== Therapeutic rationale ===
The main rationale behind the use of ketamine-assisted psychotherapy is its recognition as an effective antidepressant. With depressive symptomology being a major co-morbid problem with trauma-related disorders, treating depression can help treat the trauma and provide opportunities for the therapist to address other issues. In addition to this, Ketamine has been shown to increase synaptic and neuronal plasticity, which can help remodel traumatic memories.

=== Treatment procedure ===
Unlike MDMA and Psilocybin treatments with Ketamine can be done independently of psychotherapy sessions. In these treatments, Ketamine is given to patients either intravenously or orally in controlled doses over weeks. In other settings, Ketamine is given to patients before psychotherapy to help induce a state that will help facilitate therapeutic discussions. Sometimes, in addition to the dose given before the session, small controlled quantities may be allowed for patients to take at home between sessions with a therapist.

=== Evidence of effectiveness ===
Studies that used Ketamine in addition to psychotherapy showed that it was effective at reducing depression, anxiety, and PTSD symptoms. Treatments that used Ketamine with no psychotherapy sessions were shown to be associated with decreased rates of developing PTSD after experiencing a traumatic event, as well as reducing PTSD symptoms.

== Risks, safety, and concerns ==
Because most psychedelics are controlled substances in the US, there are concerns for their use in treating mental health disorders, including trauma-related disorders. Adverse effects and addiction are significant concerns people have when discussing psychedelics for the benefit of treatment. Like with any substance introduced to the body, there is always a risk of an adverse reaction to it. Because of this and the stigma around psychedelics within the US, nearly all studies researching psychedelics for treatment report adverse effects and addiction risks. A meta-analysis of 43 research studies looking at psychedelics for use in mental health treatment found that 59% of the studies reported that at least one participant with a mild adverse effect of taking psychedelics; however, none of these situations required medical interventions. These adverse effects range from physical effects such as blood pressure changes, muscle tension, headaches, and vomiting, to cognitive impacts such as experiences of panic or fear, confusion, and low mood. Even with these possible adverse effects, all events were tolerated well by the patients. The drugs seem to have a good safety profile, and patients and clinicians saw the long-term benefits of psychedelics treatment to outweigh acute aversive reactions. The other primary concern of addiction is also monitored during research. It's been found that the psychedelics used for treatment have very low drug dependency rates, with participants reporting no drug addictions to the substances used in their treatment.

=== Cannabis ===
Trauma contributed to promoting the use and potential abuse of cannabis. Conversely, cannabis use has been associated with the intensity of trauma and PTSD symptoms. Its use is not recommended.

== See also ==
- Psychedelic therapy
- Psychoplastogen
- List of investigational hallucinogens and entactogens
