= Field Trip Health =

Canadian ketamine-assisted psychotherapy company

- Traded as: Nasdaq: FTRP
- Industry: Psychotherapy
- Founded: April 2019; 7 years ago
- Founders: Ronan Levy; Joseph del Moral; Hannan Fleiman; Dr. Ryan Yermus; Mujeeb Jafferi
- Defunct: May 2022
- Fate: Split into two independent companies
- Successors: Stella (formerly Field Trip Health and Wellness); Reunion Neuroscience
- Headquarters: Toronto, Canada
- Services: Ketamine-assisted psychotherapy

Field Trip Health was a Canadian Ketamine-assisted psychotherapy company, founded in April 2019. In May 2022, the company split into two separate, independent entities: Field Trip Health and Wellness and Reunion Neuroscience.

Field Trip Health and Wellness is now defunct with its assets acquired by two different companies, while Reunion Neuroscience is still active as of 2024, continuing the development of the psychedelic compound FT-104.

== History ==
Field Trip Health was founded in April 2019 by Ronan Levy, Joseph del Moral, Hannan Fleiman, Dr. Ryan Yermus and Mujeeb Jafferi. All of the cofounders, except for Jafferi, previously worked together in the Canadian cannabis industry.

The company was developing the psychedelic molecule, FT-104. The compound targeted the 5-HT_{2A} receptor in the brain, the same receptor that psilocybin targets, and intended to produce a hallucinogenic effect that lasted roughly two hours, or approximately half the time a psychedelic experience with magic mushrooms lasts.

The company went public on the Canadian Securities Exchange in October 2020, completing a reverse takeover of the Newton Energy Corporation, an oil and gas company. It would later be listed on the Nasdaq in July 2021.

In May 2022, Field Trip Health's board voted to split the company into two independent entities. The company would split into "Field Trip Health and Wellness", focusing on its medical care offerings, and "Field Trip Discovery" (later rebranded to Reunion Neuroscience), focusing on the research and development of psychedelic therapies.

=== Field Trip Health and Wellness ===
In January 2023, Field Trip Health and Wellness faced both "claims or potential claims" of over $59 million. Two months later, the company laid off a majority of its staff, closed clinics, and sought protection from creditors under the Canadian Companies' Creditors Arrangement Act. Throughout the entirety of the company's existence, close to CA$100 million of investor's money was spent in an attempt to make Field Trip a successful company. The company's three American clinics (New York, Washington, D.C., and California) were acquired by Stella, a healthcare company, for $751,770, and its Canadian clinics (Toronto and Vancouver) were acquired by the Canadian Centre for Psychedelic Healing for $627,900. Each buyer actively offers ketamine treatments. In May 2023, the company sold its Jamaican research and cultivation laboratory where it grew psilocybin mushrooms for $350,000 to Jamaican businessman William Mahfood. All proceeds from these sales were distributed to creditors.

Ultimately, the American assets and company name would be folded under the Stella brand. As part of the acquisition, co-founder Mujeeb Jafferi and chief technology officer Amardeep Manhas joined Stella, taking on the roles of president and clinics operation officer. Stella also received Field Trip's advanced outcome data, research, and tech stack.

=== Reunion Neuroscience ===
Reunion Neuroscience
- Type: Private
- Industry: Biotechnology
- Predecessor: Field Trip Health
- Founded: May 2022; 4 years ago
- Founders: Ronan Levy; Dr. Ryan Yermus; Hannan Fleiman; Mujeeb Jafferi; Joseph del Moral
- Headquarters: Morristown, New Jersey, United States
- Key people: Greg Mayes (President, CEO)
- Products: FT-104
- Owner: MPM BioImpact
- Website: reunionneuro.com

In August 2022, Reunion Neuroscience completed its separation from Field Trip Health and began trading on the Toronto Stock Exchange under the ticker REUN. The company named Greg Mayes as its president and chief executive officer in September 2022, coinciding with cofounder Ronan Levy's departure from the company's board.

In March 2023, Reunion Neuroscience filed a lawsuit against Mindset Pharma, alleging that the company "knowingly copied" the RE-104 compound and misled the United States Patent and Trademark Office when applying for a patent.

In April 2023, it was reported that Reunion Neuroscience was struggling to maintain the minimum share price requirement for listing on the Nasdaq exchange. Two months later, the company was acquired by MPM BioImpact for $13.1 million, transitioning it into a private company.

In May 2024, Reunion Neuroscience raised $103 million in Series A funding, co-led by Novo Holdings and MPM BioImpact. The funds are to be released roughly in thirds (a third upfront, another for hitting milestones during Phase II trials, the final third for positive results). The company was reported as "developing serotonergic psilocybin-like compounds initially for treating postnatal depression", referring to the RE-104 compound. The company is also exploring the compound's use as a treatment for other applications, such as cancer-related adjustment disorder. The funds are planned to be used in support of a Phase II trial of the compound.

== See also ==
- List of psychedelic pharmaceutical companies
- List of investigational hallucinogens and entactogens
