= Eleusis (company) =

British pharmaceutical company

- Industry: Pharmaceutical; Psychedelic medicine
- Founded: 2013; 13 years ago
- Founder: Shlomi Raz; Charles D. Nichols
- Headquarters: London, United Kingdom
- Number of employees: 7 (2020)
- Parent: Beckley Psytech
- Website: https://web.archive.org/web/20240801000000*/http://www.eleusisltd.com/

Eleusis is a pharmaceutical company that is developing serotonin 5-HT_{2A} receptor agonists related to serotonergic psychedelics as novel anti-inflammatory drugs to treat inflammatory diseases. It is interested in developing the drugs for treatment of conditions like asthma, cardiovascular disease, and Crohn's disease, but is initially focusing on ophthalmology.

Its drug candidates include ELE-02 (2C-iBu) and its predecessor ELE-01 (possibly (R)-DOI), which are both phenethylamines. It is developing ELE-02 as a topical eye drop to treat inflammatory eye conditions. (R)-DOI is said to be a fallback candidate for ELE-02. The company is also studying lysergic acid diethylamide (LSD) microdosing in the treatment of Alzheimer's disease. In addition, they are studying psilocybin infusion (ELE-101; ELE-Psilo; ELE-Psilo+) and ketamine (ELE-Ket+) for treatment of major depressive disorder.

Eleusis was co-founded by business executive and former Goldman Sachs managing director Shlomi Raz and by psychedelic pharmacologist Charles D. Nichols in London, United Kingdom in 2013. The company was named after the Eleusinian Mysteries. It was the first company to start developing psychedelic drugs as medicines. Raz is the company's Chief Executive Officer (CEO) and chairman, while Nichols is its lead scientist. Emeline Maillet is the company's scientific director and Tim Foster is a collaborator or colleague of Nichols and another scientist at Eleusis. A preclinical and clinical development program to develop novel serotonergic anti-inflammatory agents with reduced or no hallucinogenic effects was launched in 2015 and led to its ELE compounds.

Eleusis was acquired by Beckley Psytech in October 2022.

== See also ==
- List of psychedelic pharmaceutical companies
- List of investigational hallucinogens and entactogens
- 5-HT_{2A} receptor § Anti-inflammatory effects
