= Usona Institute =

American non-profit medical research organization

- Type: 501(c)(3) non-profit medical research organization
- Industry: Pharmaceutical; Psychedelic medicine
- Founded: 2014; 12 years ago in Madison, Wisconsin, United States
- Founder: Bill Linton; Malynn Utzinger
- Headquarters: Madison, Wisconsin, United States
- Number of employees: 18 (March 2019)
- Website: www.usonainstitute.org

The Usona Institute is a 501(c)(3) non-profit medical research organization (MRO) which is developing psychedelic drugs for potential medical use. It was launched by scientist and entrepreneur Bill Linton, who is the founder of the biotechnology company Promega Corporation, and by physician Malynn Utzinger in 2014.

The organization is developing psilocybin (4-HO-DMT) for treatment of depression. It started a phase 2 clinical trial of psilocybin for major depressive disorder in 2019. The same year, this candidate received Food and Drug Administration (FDA) "breakthrough therapy" designation. This clinical trial has since been completed and its psilocybin candidate is now in phase 3 clinical studies. In July 2024, it was said that the Usona Institute was leading the largest clinical trial of ongoing psilocybin treatment for depression, a phase 3 trial with 240 participants treated with 5 or 25 mg psilocybin or placebo. Other candidates of the institute include mebufotenin (5-MeO-DMT) and bufotenin (5-HO-DMT), among others.

The Usona Institute is notable in manufacturing large quantities of synthetic psilocybin and supplying the drug for clinical trials throughout the world, which it does for free for research purposes.

== See also ==
- List of psychedelic pharmaceutical companies
- List of investigational hallucinogens and entactogens
