= GM-2040 =

Clinical data
- Other names: GM2040
- Drug class: Non-hallucinogenic serotonin 5-HT_{2A} receptor agonist

GM-2040 is a putatively non-hallucinogenic serotonin 5-HT_{2A} receptor agonist which was developed by Gilgamesh Pharmaceuticals. It is a partial agonist of the serotonin 5-HT_{2A} receptor, with a K_{i} of 3.4 nM, an EC_{50} of 43.8 nM, and an E_{max} of 71.1%. Relative to the serotonergic psychedelic DOPR, the drug only weakly produces the head-twitch response (HTR), a behavioral proxy of psychedelic effects, in rodents, and hence may not produce hallucinogenic effects in humans. On the other hand, GM-2040 shows robust and persistent antidepressant-like effects in rodents.

== See also ==
- List of investigational hallucinogens and entactogens
- Non-hallucinogenic 5-HT_{2A} receptor agonist
