= XW10508 =

Experimental esketamine prodrug

Clinical data
- Other names: XW10508; XW-10508
- Routes of administration: Oral
- Drug class: NMDA receptor antagonist; Antidepressant; Analgesic; Dissociative; Hallucinogen
- ATC code: None

XW10508 is an orally active prodrug of esketamine, an NMDA receptor antagonist, which is under development for the treatment of major depressive disorder and chronic pain. It is taken by mouth.

The drug is a novel esketamine analogue and conjugate that acts as a prodrug of esketamine. Esketamine, and by extension XW10508, is an NMDA receptor antagonist and indirect AMPA receptor activator. XW10508 is being developed as once-daily orally administered extended-release and immediate-release formulations with misuse resistance.

As of August 2024, XW10508 is in phase 2 clinical trials for major depressive disorder and is in phase 1 clinical trials for chronic pain. However, no recent development has been reported for these indications. The drug is being developed by XWPharma, which was previously known as XW Laboratories. It is being developed in Australia. The chemical structure of XW10508 does not yet seem to have been disclosed.

== See also ==
- List of investigational hallucinogens and entactogens
