= KB-128 =

Clinical data
- Other names: KB128
- Routes of administration: Unspecified
- Drug class: Serotonin 5-HT_{2C} receptor agonist; Serotonin 5-HT_{2A} receptor antagonist; Serotonin 5-HT_{2B} receptor antagonist

KB-128 is a serotonin 5-HT_{2} receptor modulator which is under development for the treatment of alcoholism (alcohol use disorder). Its route is unspecified.

The drug acts as a biased agonist of the serotonin 5-HT_{2C} receptor, with high G_{q} protein bias and minimal or negligible β-arrestin recruitment. It additionally acts as a silent antagonist of the serotonin 5-HT_{2A} and 5-HT_{2B} receptors. Due to its lack of activation of the serotonin 5-HT_{2A} and 5-HT_{2B} receptors, KB-128 is expected to lack hallucinogenic activity and cardiac valvulopathy risk, respectively. The drug has been reported to reduce alcohol consumption in rodents. It is being studied in terms of influence on methamphetamine-induced hyperactivity in rodents as well.

KB-128 is under development by Küleon Bioscience (formerly Psilosterics). It was first described by 2023. As of November 2025, the drug is in the preclinical research stage of development for treatment of alcoholism. There is also interest in KB-128 for potential treatment of various other conditions, including schizophrenia, Alzheimer's disease psychosis, depression, other addictions like stimulant use disorder, and obesity. KB-128 is listed on Psychedelic Alpha's drug development tracker and hence may be related to serotonergic psychedelics. The chemical structure of KB-128 does not yet appear to have been disclosed, though KB-128's structure is known to have been patented.

Besides KB-128, other candidates of Küleon Bioscience in earlier development include selective serotonin 5-HT_{2A} receptor agonists and mixed serotonin 5-HT_{2A} and 5-HT_{2C} receptor agonists, for instance non-hallucinogenic psychoplastogens. They have also patented many additional hallucinogenic and non-hallucinogenic compounds besides KB-128.

== See also ==
- List of investigational hallucinogens and entactogens
- List of investigational substance-related disorder drugs
- BMB-101 and BMB-105
- Bexicaserin
- DLX-2270
