= LSR-3000 =

Clinical data
- Other names: LSR3000
- Routes of administration: Oral
- Drug class: Serotonin receptor agonist; Psychoplastogen

LSR-3000 is a non-selective serotonin receptor agonist and psychoplastogen of the tryptamine family which is under development for the treatment of neurological disorders. The drug is taken by mouth. It is under development by Lusaris Therapeutics. As of November 2022, LSR-3000 is in the research or discovery stage of development. Its chemical structure does not yet appear to have been disclosed.

== See also ==
- List of investigational hallucinogens and entactogens
