= Mydecine =

Pharmaceutical company

- Industry: Pharmaceutical; Psychedelic medicine
- Founded: 2020; 6 years ago in Denver, Colorado
- Headquarters: Vancouver, British Columbia, Canada
- Website: mydecine.com

Mydecine Innovations Group, or simply Mydecine, is an American and Canadian pharmaceutical company that is developing psychedelics and entactogens as medicines.

In August 2022, it was reported that Mydecine was experiencing financial difficulties and might cease operations. However, the company was able to obtain more funding and did not shutdown. Mydecine made the first legal import of magic mushrooms into Canada in 2021.

Mydecine's drug candidates include the psychedelics psilocybin (MYCO-001, MYCO-003), MYCO-004 (a patch-delivered tryptamine), and MYCO-005 (a novel aza psilocin analogue with putatively better safety) and the novel MDMA-like entactogens MYCO-002 (putatively safer), MYCO-006 (short-acting), and MYCO-007 (short-acting).

Although the chemical structures of most of its drug candidates have not been disclosed, Mydecine has patented 5-BZT-MDMA (MY100) and 6-BZT-MDMA (MY101) as short-acting MDMA analogues.

== See also ==
- List of psychedelic pharmaceutical companies
- List of investigational hallucinogens and entactogens
