= Promega =

Biotechnology company

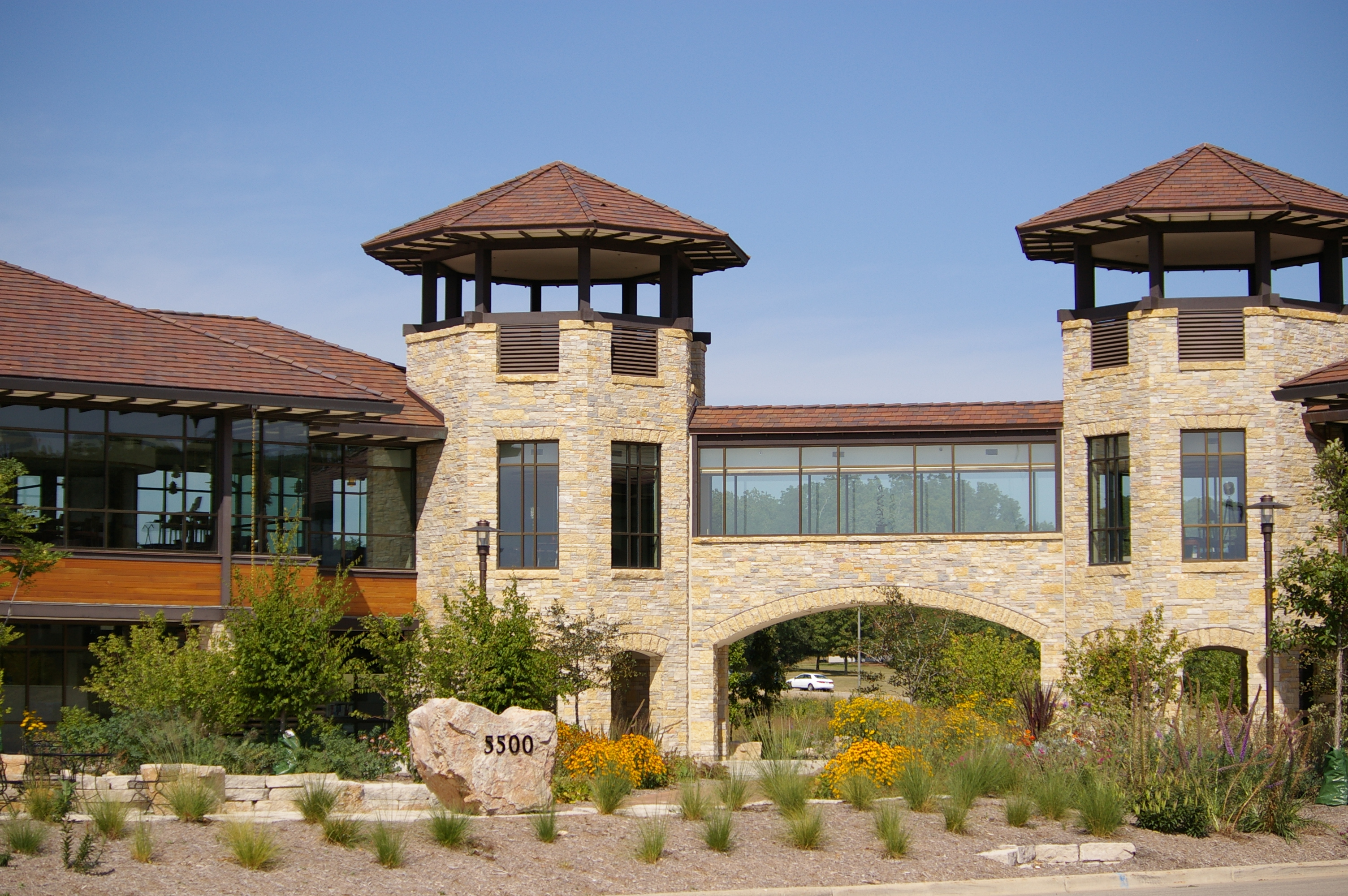
- Formerly: Biotec
- Type: Private
- Industry: Biotechnology
- Founded: 1978
- Headquarters: Madison, Wisconsin, United States
- Key people: William A. Linton Chairman and CEO
- Number of employees: 1,733 (2023)
- Website: www.promega.com

Promega Corporation is a Madison, Wisconsin–based manufacturer of enzymes and other products for biotechnology and molecular biology with a portfolio covering the fields of genomics, protein analysis and expression, cellular analysis, drug discovery, and genetic identity.

== History ==
Promega Corporation was founded by Bill Linton in 1978 to provide restriction enzymes for biotechnology. The company now offers more than 4,000 life science products used by scientists, researchers and life science and pharmaceutical companies. Promega has 1,601 employees.

The privately held company has branch offices in 16 countries and more than 50 global distributors serving 100 countries. Promega Corporation also established the first biotechnology joint venture in China (Sino-American Biotechnology Co. in 1985).

The company has developed an on-site stocking system, which uses radio frequency identification (RFID) linked to the Internet to track and manage remote inventory. This resulted in the spin-off company Terso Solutions, which specializes in the design and manufacturing of small RFID storage units.

In February 2020, Foreign Policy reported that Promega had sold equipment to the Xinjiang Production and Construction Corps. In 2021, The New York Times reported that, despite bans, Promega equipment continued to be sold to police in Xinjiang.

== See also ==
- Usona Institute
