= Gilgamesh Pharmaceuticals =

American pharmaceutical company

- Industry: Pharmaceutical; Psychedelic medicine
- Founded: 2019; 7 years ago
- Website: www.gilgameshpharmaceutical.com

Gilgamesh Pharmaceuticals is a pharmaceutical company that is developing psychedelic and related drugs as medicines. It is a "discovery stage" company and is focused on developing new chemical entities.

Its drug candidates include the ketamine-related NMDA receptor antagonist blixeprodil (GM-1020; (R)-4-fluorodeschloroketamine or (R)-4-FDCK), the dimethyltryptamine (DMT)-related serotonergic psychedelic bretisilocin (GM-2505; 5-fluoro-N-methyl-N-ethyltryptamine or 5F-MET), the noribogaine-related κ-opioid receptor agonist GM-3009, and the non-hallucinogenic psychoplastogen GM-5022. Another potential candidate is GM-2040, a putatively non-hallucinogenic serotonin 5-HT_{2A} receptor agonist.

The company was co-founded by Jonathan Sporn, Jeff Witkin, Dalibor Sames, Andrew Kruegel, and Mike Cunningham. Cunningham is a research scientist at Gilgamesh. Sames, Kruegel, and Cunningham have worked together at Sames's lab at Columbia University.

In May 2024, AbbVie made an optional deal with Gilgamesh Pharmaceuticals to pay $65 million upright for rights to novel non-hallucinogenic psychoplastogens. It also agreed to pay up to $1.95 billion for a series of psychoplastogens. In August 2025, AbbVie acquired bretisilocin from Gilgamesh Pharmaceuticals in a deal worth up to $1.2 billion.

== See also ==
- List of psychedelic pharmaceutical companies
- List of investigational hallucinogens and entactogens
