= PSYLO-5001 =

Clinical data
- Other names: PSYLO5001; Psylo-5001; Psylo5001; XYL-5001; XYL5001
- Routes of administration: Unspecified
- Drug class: Serotonin receptor agonist; Non-hallucinogenic serotonin 5-HT_{2A} receptor agonist

PSYLO-5001 is a non-hallucinogenic serotonin receptor agonist which is under development for the treatment of mental disorders. Its route of administration is unspecified. The drug is under development by Xylo Bio (formerly Psylo). As of January 2025, PSYLO-5001 is in the research or preclinical research stage of development. Its chemical structure does not yet appear to have been disclosed.

== See also ==
- List of investigational hallucinogens and entactogens
- Non-hallucinogenic 5-HT_{2A} receptor agonist
