= XYL-4001 =

Clinical data
- Other names: XYL-4001; XYL4001; PSYLO-4001; Psylo-4001; PSYLO4001
- Routes of administration: Unspecified
- Drug class: Serotonin receptor agonist; Non-hallucinogenic serotonin 5-HT_{2A} receptor agonist; Psychoplastogen

XYL-4001, formerly known as PSYLO-4001, is a non-hallucinogenic serotonin 5-HT_{2A} receptor agonist and psychoplastogen which is under development for the treatment of depressive disorders such as major depressive disorder. Its route of administration is unspecified. The drug is being developed by Xylo Bio (formerly known as Psylo). As of January 2025, it is in the preclinical research stage of development. Its chemical structure does not yet appear to have been disclosed.

== See also ==
- List of investigational hallucinogens and entactogens
- List of investigational antidepressants
- Non-hallucinogenic 5-HT_{2A} receptor agonist
