= XYL-3001 =

Clinical data
- Other names: XYL3001; PSYLO-3001; PSYLO3001; Psylo-3001
- Routes of administration: Unspecified
- Drug class: Non-hallucinogenic serotonin 5-HT_{2A} receptor agonist

XYL-3001, formerly known as PSYLO-3001, is a non-hallucinogenic serotonin 5-HT_{2A} receptor agonist and psychoplastogen which is under development for the treatment of depressive disorders, generalized anxiety disorder, and social phobia (social anxiety disorder). Its route of administration is unspecified. The drug is being developed by Xylo Bio (previously Psylo). As of January 2025, it is in the preclinical research stage of development. XYL-3001's chemical structure does not yet appear to have been disclosed.

== See also ==
- List of investigational hallucinogens and entactogens
- Non-hallucinogenic 5-HT_{2A} receptor agonist
