= List of investigational hallucinogens and entactogens =

This is a list of investigational hallucinogens and entactogens, or hallucinogens and entactogens that are currently under formal development for clinical use but are not yet approved.

Chemical/generic names are listed first, with developmental code names, synonyms, and brand names in parentheses. The list also includes non-hallucinogenic drugs related to hallucinogens, such as non-hallucinogenic serotonin 5-HT_{2A} receptor agonists and non-hallucinogenic ketamine analogues. Cannabinoids, or cannabinoid receptor modulators, are not included in this list. Many of the indications are not for continuous medication therapy but rather are for medication-assisted psychotherapy or short-term use only. The section that the drug is in corresponds to its highest developmental phase, not its phase for all listed indications.

This list was last comprehensively updated in October 2024. It is likely to become outdated with time.

== Under development ==
=== Preregistration ===
- Midomafetamine (MDMA; "ecstasy") – serotonin, norepinephrine, and dopamine releasing agent, weak serotonin 5-HT_{2A}, 5-HT_{2B}, 5-HT_{2C} receptor agonist, entactogen, and weak psychedelic hallucinogen – post-traumatic stress disorder, alcoholism, social anxiety in autism – Multidisciplinary Association for Psychedelic Studies (MAPS), Resilient Pharmaceuticals (Lykos Therapeutics)

=== Phase 3 ===
- Deupsilocin (HLP003; HLP-003; CYB003; CYB-003; psilocin-d10; deuterated psilocybin analogue; deuterated psilocin) – serotonin 5-HT_{2A} receptor agonist and psychedelic hallucinogen – major depressive disorder, alcoholism, psychiatric disorders – Helus Pharma (Cybin)
- Ketamine (AWKN-001, AWKN-P-001) – ionotropic glutamate NMDA receptor antagonist and dissociative hallucinogen – alcoholism, binge-eating disorder, gambling, impulse control disorders, obsessive–compulsive disorder – Awakn Life Sciences
- Ketamine (HTX-100; NRX-100) – ionotropic glutamate NMDA receptor antagonist – suicidal ideation, mental disorders – NRx Pharmaceuticals
- Lysergic acid diethylamide (LSD; lysergide; DT120; DT-120; MM120; MM-120) – non-selective serotonin receptor agonist and psychedelic hallucinogen – anxiety disorders, attention-deficit hyperactivity disorder, cluster headache, major depressive disorder, pain – Definium Therapeutics (MindMed)
- Lysergic acid diethylamide (LSD; lysergide; MB-22001/MB22001) – non-selective serotonin receptor agonist and psychedelic hallucinogen – major depressive disorder, existential distress in cancer patients – MindBio Therapeutics
- Psilocybin (COMP-360; COMP360) – non-selective serotonin receptor agonist and psychedelic hallucinogen – depressive disorders, anorexia nervosa, bipolar depression, major depressive disorder, post-traumatic stress disorder, somatoform disorders, pervasive child development disorders – COMPASS Pathways
- Psilocybin – non-selective serotonin receptor agonist and psychedelic hallucinogen – major depressive disorder, borderline personality disorder – Usona Institute

=== Phase 2 ===
- (R)-Midomafetamine ((R)-MDMA; (R)-methylenedioxymetamfetamine; MM-402) – serotonin, norepinephrine, and dopamine releasing agent, weak serotonin 5-HT_{2A}, 5-HT_{2B}, 5-HT_{2C} receptor agonist, entactogen, and weak psychedelic hallucinogen – pervasive child development disorders/autism spectrum disorder – Definium Therapeutics (MindMed)
- (R)-Midomafetamine ((R)-MDMA; R-MDMA; EMP-01) – serotonin, norepinephrine, and dopamine releasing agent, weak serotonin 5-HT_{2A}, 5-HT_{2B}, 5-HT_{2C} receptor agonist, entactogen, and weak psychedelic hallucinogen – post-traumatic stress disorder, social phobia – EmpathBio
- Arketamine ((R)-ketamine; PCN-101) – ionotropic glutamate NMDA receptor antagonist and dissociative hallucinogen – depressive disorders – ATAI Life Sciences
- Blixeprodil (GM-1020; (R)-4-fluorodeschloroketamine; (R)-4-FDCK) – orally active NMDA receptor receptor antagonist – major depressive disorder, bipolar depression, depressive disorders – Gilgamesh Pharmaceuticals
- Bretisilocin (GM-2505; 5F-MET; 5-fluoro-N-methyl-N-ethyltryptamine) – serotonin 5-HT_{2A} and 5-HT_{2C} receptor agonist, serotonin 5-HT_{2B} receptor antagonist, psychedelic hallucinogen, and serotonin releasing agent – major depressive disorder – Gilgamesh Pharmaceuticals
- Deudimethyltryptamine (HLP004; HLP-004; CYB004; DMT-d10; deuterated dimethyltryptamine; deuterated DMT; dDMT) – non-selective serotonin receptor agonist and psychedelic hallucinogen – generalized anxiety disorder – Helus Pharma (Cybin)
- Dimethyltryptamine (DMT; BMND-01/BMND01, BMND-02/BMND02, BMND-03/BMND03) – non-selective serotonin receptor agonist and psychedelic hallucinogen – depressive disorders, fibromyalgia, substance-related disorders – Biomind Labs
- Esketamine (CLE-100) – ionotropic glutamate NMDA receptor antagonist and dissociative hallucinogen – major depressive disorder, bipolar depression – Clexio Biosciences
- Ketamine (Ereska; IN ketamine; ketamine IN; intranasal ketamine; intranasal racemic ketamine; PMI-100, PMI-150, SLS-002, TUR-002) – ionotropic glutamate NMDA receptor antagonist and dissociative hallucinogen – post-traumatic stress disorder, suicidal ideation, acute pain, cancer pain – Seelos Therapeutics
- Ketamine extended-release (R-107, R107) – ionotropic glutamate NMDA receptor antagonist and dissociative hallucinogen – major depressive disorder – Douglas Pharmaceuticals
- Ketamine prolonged-release oral (KET-01) – ionotropic glutamate NMDA receptor antagonist and dissociative hallucinogen – depressive disorders, neuropathic pain – Ketabon
- Ketamine/temsirolimus (FREE001) – ionotropic glutamate NMDA receptor antagonist, dissociative hallucinogen, and mTOR inhibitor combination – major depressive disorder – Freedom Biosciences
- Luvesilocin (RE-104/RE104; FT-104/FT104; 4-HO-DiPT/iprocin prodrug) – serotonin 5-HT_{2A} receptor agonist and psychedelic hallucinogen – postnatal depression – Reunion Neuroscience
- Mebufotenin (5-MeO-DMT; BPL-002, BPL-003) – non-selective serotonin receptor agonist and psychedelic hallucinogen – alcoholism, major depressive disorder – Beckley Psytech
- Mebufotenin (5-MeO-DMT; BMND-05/BMND05, BMND-08/BMND08) – non-selective serotonin receptor agonist and psychedelic hallucinogen – Alzheimer's disease, pain – Biomind Labs
- Mebufotenin (5-MeO-DMT; GH001/GH-001; GH002/GH-002; GH003/GH-003) – non-selective serotonin receptor agonist and psychedelic hallucinogen – depressive disorders – GH Research
- Methylone (MDMC; TSND-201) – serotonin, norepinephrine, and dopamine releasing agent and entactogen – post-traumatic stress disorders, major depressive disorder, CNS disorders – Transcend Therapeutics
- Midomafetamine (MDMA; "ecstasy") – serotonin, norepinephrine, and dopamine releasing agent, weak serotonin 5-HT_{2A}, 5-HT_{2B}, 5-HT_{2C} receptor agonist, entactogen, and weak psychedelic hallucinogen – alcoholism – Awakn Life Sciences
- Midomafetamine/citalopram (MDMA/citalopram) – serotonin, norepinephrine, and dopamine releasing agent, weak serotonin 5-HT_{2A}, 5-HT_{2B}, 5-HT_{2C} receptor agonist, entactogen, and weak psychedelic hallucinogen followed by a selective serotonin reuptake inhibitor – post-traumatic stress disorder – Tactogen
- MSP-1014 (psilocin prodrug) – non-selective serotonin receptor agonist and psychedelic hallucinogen – major depressive disorder – Mindset Pharma, Otsuka America Pharmaceutical
- Non-racemic MDMA (ALA-002; 70–80% (R)-MDMA, 20–30% (S)-MDMA) – serotonin, norepinephrine, and dopamine releasing agent, weak serotonin 5-HT_{2A}, 5-HT_{2B}, 5-HT_{2C} receptor agonist, entactogen, and weak psychedelic hallucinogen – social anxiety in autism spectrum disorder – PharmAla Biotech
- OSU-6162 (PNU-9639; PNU-96391; PNU-96391A) – non-hallucinogenic serotonin 5-HT_{2A} receptor partial agonist, dopamine D_{2} receptor partial agonist, and sigma σ_{1} receptor ligand (so-called "monoaminergic stabilizer") – bipolar depression, chronic fatigue syndrome, depressive disorders, stroke, subarachnoid hemorrhage, Parkinson's disease – Carlsson Research AB, Pfizer
- Psilocin – non-selective serotonin receptor agonist and psychedelic hallucinogen – adjustment disorder – Psyence BioMed
- Psilocin – non-selective serotonin receptor agonist and psychedelic hallucinogen – generalized anxiety disorder – Diamond Therapeutics
- Psilocybin (low-dose; APEX-52 / 90) – non-selective serotonin receptor agonist and psychedelic hallucinogen – depressive disorders, anxiety disorders – Apex Laboratories
- Psilocybin – non-selective serotonin receptor agonist and psychedelic hallucinogen – fragile X syndrome – Restart Life Sciences
- Psilocybin (CYB-001; CYB001; HLP001; INT0052/2020) – non-selective serotonin receptor agonist and psychedelic hallucinogen – mental disorders, major depressive disorder, anxiety disorders – Helus Pharma (Cybin)
- Psilocybin (MYCO-001, MYCO-003) – non-selective serotonin receptor agonist and psychedelic hallucinogen – post-traumatic stress disorder, anxiety disorders, depressive disorders, headache, substance-related disorders – Mydecine
- Psilocybin (PEX-010/PEX010) – non-selective serotonin receptor agonist and psychedelic hallucinogen – adjustment disorders, alcoholism, depressive disorders, anxiety disorders – Filament Health
- Psilocybin (PFN™; TRP-8802, TRP-8803, TRP-8804, TRYP-0082) – non-selective serotonin receptor agonist and psychedelic hallucinogen – binge-eating disorder, fibromyalgia, irritable bowel syndrome, cancer, complex regional pain syndrome, pain – Tryp Therapeutics
- Psilocybin (Psi-GAD; PSX-001) – non-selective serotonin receptor agonist and psychedelic hallucinogen – generalized anxiety disorder – Incannex
- Psilocybin (RSTP-1000) – non-selective serotonin receptor agonist and psychedelic hallucinogen – demoralization syndrome – Reset Pharma
- Psilocybin (SYNP-101; synthetic psilocybin) – alcoholism, obsessive–compulsive disorders, cluster headache, migraine – Ceruvia Lifesciences
- Xenon (NBTX-001) – ionotropic glutamate NMDA receptor antagonist and dissociative hallucinogen – post-traumatic stress disorder, Alzheimer's disease, irritable bowel syndrome, Parkinson's disease, pervasive child development disorders, panic disorder – Nobilis Therapeutics
- Zolunicant (18-methoxycoronaridine; 18-MC; MM-110) – α_{3}β_{4} nicotinic acetylcholine receptor antagonist, other actions – leishmaniasis, opioid-related disorders, substance-related disorders – Definium Therapeutics (MindMed)

=== Phase 1/2 ===
- Dimethyltryptamine (DMT; SPL-026) – non-selective serotonin receptor agonist and psychedelic hallucinogen – major depressive disorder – Small Pharma, Helus Pharma (Cybin)
- Dimethyltryptamine/harmine (DMT/harmine; RE01) – non-selective serotonin receptor agonist, psychedelic hallucinogen, and monoamine oxidase inhibitor combination – generalized anxiety disorder – reconnect Labs
- Ibogaine (IBX-210) – various actions and hallucinogen – opioid-related disorders – ATAI Life Sciences/DemeRx
- Mebufotenin (5-MeO-DMT; RE02) – non-selective serotonin receptor agonist and psychedelic hallucinogen – generalized anxiety disorder – reconnect Labs
- Psilocybin (PSY-0.1, PSY-0.2, PSY-0.3, PSY-0.4/0.5, PSY-0.6) – non-selective serotonin receptor agonist and psychedelic hallucinogen – substance-related disorders, neurological disorders, opioid-related disorders, psychiatric disorders, traumatic brain injury, cancer, anxiety disorders, bipolar disorders, depressive disorders, eating disorders, and additional unspecified conditions – Revive Therapeutics
- Psilocybin infusion (ELE-101, ELE-Psilo, ELE-Psilo+) – non-selective serotonin receptor agonist and psychedelic hallucinogen – major depressive disorder – Eleusis, Beckley Psytech

=== Phase 1 ===
- 2-Bromo-LSD (bromolysergide; BOL-148; NYPRG-101) – non-hallucinogenic serotonin 5-HT_{2A} receptor agonist and other actions – cluster headache, migraine – Ceruvia Lifesciences
- 5-Methoxy-2-aminoindane (5-MeO-AI; MEAI; CMND-100) – serotonin releasing agent and entactogen – alcoholism, cocaine use disorder, metabolic syndrome, obesity – Clearmind Medicine
- 5-MeO-MiPT (MSD-001; "moxy") – non-selective serotonin receptor agonist and psychedelic hallucinogen – undefined indication – Mindstate Design Labs
- BMND07 (BMND-07; dimethyltryptamine or 5-MeO-DMT combination drug) – non-selective serotonin receptor agonist, serotonergic hallucinogen, and other actions combination – major depressive disorder – Biomind Labs
- Dimethyltryptamine (DMT; AP-188; IV DMT) – non-selective serotonin receptor agonist and psychedelic hallucinogen – stroke – Algernon Neuroscience
- Dimethyltryptamine (DMT; EBRX-101) – non-selective serotonin receptor agonist and psychedelic hallucinogen – smoking withdrawal, alcoholism – Entheon Biomedical
- Dimethyltryptamine (DMT; VLS-01; buccal DMT film) – non-selective serotonin receptor agonist and psychedelic hallucinogen – depressive disorders – ATAI Life Sciences, Viridia Life Sciences
- Dimethyltryptamine/β-carboline (DMT/β-carboline) – non-selective serotonin receptor agonist, psychedelic hallucinogen, and monoamine oxidase inhibitor combination – undisclosed – Psychae Therapeutics
- ENX-205 – non-hallucinogenic serotonin 5-HT_{1A} and 5-HT_{2A} receptor agonist and dopamine D_{2} and D_{3} receptor antagonist – mood disorders, post-traumatic stress disorder – Engrail Therapeutics
- Esketamine ((S)-ketamine; S-ketamine; AWKN-002) – ionotropic glutamate NMDA receptor antagonist and dissociative hallucinogen – alcoholism – Awakn Life Sciences
- Ketamine oral (Keticap) – ionotropic glutamate NMDA receptor antagonist and dissociative hallucinogen – mood disorders – Neurocentrx Pharma
- Ketanserin – serotonin 5-HT_{2A} and α_{1}-adrenergic receptor antagonist – hallucinogen antidote – Definium Therapeutics (MindMed)
- Lys-MDA – methylenedioxyamphetamine (MDA) prodrug (serotonin, norepinephrine, and dopamine releasing agent, weak serotonin 5-HT_{2A}, 5-HT_{2B}, and 5-HT_{2C} receptor agonist, entactogen, and weak psychedelic hallucinogen) – unknown – Definium Therapeutics (MindMed), MiHKAL
- Lys-MDMA – midomafetamine (MDMA) prodrug (serotonin, norepinephrine, and dopamine releasing agent, weak serotonin 5-HT_{2A}, 5-HT_{2B}, and 5-HT_{2C} receptor agonist, entactogen, and weak psychedelic hallucinogen) – unknown – Definium Therapeutics (MindMed), MiHKAL
- Mebufotenin (5-MeO-DMT) – non-selective serotonin receptor agonist and psychedelic hallucinogen – undisclosed – Usona Institute
- Mebufotenin (5-MeO-DMT) – non-selective serotonin receptor agonist and psychedelic hallucinogen – substance use disorders – Alvarius Pharmaceuticals
- Mescaline (BMND-06/BMND06, BMND-09/BMND09) – non-selective serotonin 5-HT_{2A} receptor agonist and psychedelic hallucinogen – obesity, Parkinson's disease, inflammation – Biomind Labs
- Mescaline (JOUR-5700) – non-selective serotonin receptor agonist and psychedelic hallucinogen – alcoholism – Journey Colab
- MSP-2020 (MSP2020) – serotonin 5-HT_{2A} receptor agonist and psychedelic hallucinogenic (prodrug) – mental disorders, major depressive disorder – Mindset Pharma, Otsuka America Pharmaceutical
- Noribogaine (DMX-1001) – various actions – alcohol use disorder – DemeRx
- Psilocybin (MLS-101/MLS101) – non-selective serotonin receptor agonist and psychedelic hallucinogen – neuropsychiatric disorders, opioid use disorder, obsessive–compulsive disorder, premenstrual dysphoric disorder – MycoMedia Life Sciences
- Psilocybin (REL-P11) – non-selective serotonin receptor agonist and psychedelic hallucinogen – neurodegenerative disorders, metabolic disorders, psychiatric disorders – Arbormentis, Relmada Therapeutics
- SNTX-2643 (SENS-01) – atypical serotonin reuptake inhibitor (SRI) (kanna-derived) – social anxiety disorder, anxiety disorders, depressive disorders – Sensorium Therapeutics
- SPL028 (D_{2}-DMT; α,α-dideutero-DMT) – non-selective serotonin receptor agonist and psychedelic hallucinogen – depressive disorders – Helus Pharma (Cybin), Small Pharma
- Zalsupindole (DLX-001; DLX-1; AAZ; AAZ-A-154) – non-hallucinogenic serotonin 5-HT_{2A} receptor agonist – CNS disorders, major depressive disorder – Delix Therapeutics

=== Clinical phase unknown ===
- Eplivanserin/volinanserin – fixed-dose combination of eplivanserin (serotonin 5-HT_{2A} receptor antagonist) and volinanserin (serotonin 5-HT_{2A} receptor antagonist) – hallucinogen antidote – Terran Biosciences

=== Preclinical ===
- 2-Bromo-LSD (bromolysergide; BOL-148; BETR-001, TD-0148A) – non-hallucinogenic serotonin 5-HT_{2A} receptor agonist and other actions – cluster headache, major depressive disorder, neuropathic pain, post-traumatic stress disorders – Transcend Biodynamics, BetterLife Pharma
- 2-Fluorodeschloroketamine (2-FDCK) – ionotropic glutamate NMDA receptor antagonist and dissociative hallucinogen – major depressive disorder – Clearmind Medicine
- 3-Methylmethcathinone (3-MMC; metaphedrone) – serotonin, norepinephrine, and dopamine releasing agent and entactogen – dyskinesias – Clearmind Medicine
- AB-300 (AB300) – non-hallucinogenic serotonin 5-HT_{2A} and 5-HT_{2C} receptor agonist – Parkinson's disease, late-life depression – Ariadne Bio
- AKO-001 (dimethyltryptamine/specific plant bioactive; DMT/specific plant bioactive) – non-selective serotonin receptor agonist, psychedelic hallucinogen, and "specific plant bioactive" combination – stroke – Akome Biotech
- AKO-002 (psilocybin-based formulation; psilocybin/specific plant bioactive) – non-selective serotonin receptor agonist, psychedelic hallucinogen, and "specific plant bioactive" combination – Alzheimer's disease – Akome Biotech
- AKO-003 (ketamine-based psychedelic formulation; ketamine/specific plant bioactive) – ionotropic glutamate NMDA receptor antagonist, dissociative hallucinogen, and "specific plant bioactive" combination – major depressive disorder – Akome Biotech
- AKO-004 (dimethyltryptamine/specific plant bioactive; DMT/specific plant bioactive) – non-selective serotonin receptor agonist, psychedelic hallucinogen, and "specific plant bioactive" combination – Parkinson's disease – Akome Biotech
- APA-01 (PharmAla-1) – entactogen (predicted monoamine transporter and serotonin 5-HT_{2} receptor modulator) – unknown – PharmAla Biotech
- BMB-201 (BMB-A39a prodrug) – non-hallucinogenic serotonin 5-HT_{2A} and 5-HT_{2C} receptor agonist and psychoplastogen – generalized anxiety disorder, pain – Bright Minds Biosciences
- BMB-202 – selective serotonin 5-HT_{2A} receptor agonist and psychedelic hallucinogen – depressive disorders, post-traumatic stress disorder – Bright Minds Biosciences
- CT-4201 (psilocin prodrug) – non-selective serotonin receptor agonist and psychedelic hallucinogen – major depressive disorder – CaaMTech
- Dimethyltryptamine (DMT) – non-selective serotonin receptor agonist and psychedelic hallucinogen – psychiatric disorders, social phobia – Psilera
- Dimethyltryptamine (DMT; Triptax) – non-selective serotonin receptor agonist and psychedelic hallucinogen – depressive disorders – Biomind Labs
- DLX-159 (tryptamine derivative) – undisclosed mechanism of action, serotonin 5-HT_{2B} receptor antagonist, and psychoplastogen – major depressive disorder, psychiatric disorders – Delix Therapeutics
- EB-002 (EB-373; psilocin prodrug) – non-selective serotonin receptor agonist and psychedelic hallucinogen – anxiety disorders – Enveric Biosciences
- EB-003 – non-hallucinogenic serotonin receptor agonist and psychoplastogen – anxiety disorders, depressive disorders – Enveric Biosciences
- EGX-A – serotonin 5-HT_{2A} receptor agonist and psychedelic hallucinogen – depressive disorders – ATAI Life Sciences, Entheogenix Biosciences
- EGX-B – serotonin 5-HT_{2A} receptor agonist and psychedelic hallucinogen – depressive disorders – ATAI Life Sciences, Entheogenix Biosciences
- EGX-121 – undefined mechanism of action (non-tryptamine new chemical entity) – undisclosed – atai Life Sciences
- ENX-105 – dopamine D_{2} and D_{3} receptor antagonist and non-hallucinogenic serotonin 5-HT_{1A} and 5-HT_{2A} receptor agonist – mood disorders, post-traumatic stress disorder – Engrail Therapeutics
- EQL-101 – undefined mechanism of action (non-hallucinogenic non-cardiotoxic ibogaine derivative) – substance use disorders – Equulus Therapeutics
- GM-3009 (ibogaine analogue(s); GMX-3009) – various actions – opioid-related disorders, post-traumatic stress disorder, traumatic brain injury – Gilgamesh Pharmaceuticals
- GM-5022 – undefined mechanism of action (non-hallucinogenic psychoplastogen) – depressive disorders, anxiety disorders, neurological disorders – Gilgamesh Pharmaceuticals
- HBL20017 (4-F-5-MeS-DMT) – non-hallucinogenic non-selective serotonin receptor agonist – obsessive–compulsive disorder – Negev Labs, Parow Entheobiosciences
- KB-128 – serotonin 5-HT_{2C} receptor G protein-biased agonist, serotonin 5-HT_{2A} and 5-HT_{2B} receptor antagonist – alcoholism – Küleon Bioscience (Psilosterics)
- Ibogaine – various actions and hallucinogen – CNS disorders, neuropathic pain, traumatic brain injury – MINDCURE
- Ibogaine/magnesium (SON-001) – combination of ibogaine (various actions/hallucinogen) and magnesium (mineral/cardioprotective agent) – Soneira Bio – traumatic brain injury and associated disabilities
- Ibogaine derivatives - Terran Biosciences – various actions and potential hallucinogens – neurological disorders, psychiatric disorders – Terran Biosciences
- ITI-1549 – non-hallucinogenic serotonin 5-HT_{2A} receptor agonist, serotonin 5-HT_{2B} receptor antagonist, and psychoplastogen – psychiatric disorders – Intra-Cellular Therapies
- Ketamine depot (ALA-3000) – ionotropic glutamate NMDA receptor antagonist and dissociative hallucinogen – depressive disorders – Alar Pharmaceuticals
- Ketamine subcutaneous (BB-106/BB106) – ionotropic glutamate NMDA receptor antagonist and dissociative hallucinogen – acute pain, mental disorders – Bexson Biomedical
- Ketamir-2 (Ketamir, oral ketamine analogue) – ionotropic glutamate NMDA receptor antagonist – depressive disorders – MIRA Pharmaceuticals
- Long-acting MDMA prodrug (long-acting midomafetamine prodrug) – serotonin, norepinephrine, and dopamine releasing agent, weak serotonin 5-HT_{2A}, 5-HT_{2B}, and 5-HT_{2C} receptor agonist, entactogen, and weak psychedelic hallucinogen – neurological disorders, psychiatric disorders – Terran Biosciences
- LPH-5 (novel phenethylamine) – selective serotonin 5-HT_{2A} receptor partial agonist and psychedelic hallucinogen – major depressive disorder – Lophora, Beckley Psytech
- LPH-48 (shorter-acting LPH-5 analogue) – undefined mechanism of action and serotonergic hallucinogen – alcoholism – Lophora
- Lucid-PSYCH (Lucid-201) – undefined mechanism of action and psychedelic hallucinogen – major depressive disorder – Lucid Psycheceuticals
- Lysergic acid diethylamide (LSD; lysergide) – non-selective serotonin receptor agonist and psychedelic hallucinogen – neurological disorders, psychiatric disorders – Delix Therapeutics
- MBDB – serotonin and norepinephrine releasing agent, weak serotonin 5-HT_{1} and 5-HT_{2} receptor ligand, and entactogen – autism – PharmAla Biotech
- Mebufotenin (5-MeO-DMT; LSR-1019) – non-selective serotonin receptor agonist and psychedelic hallucinogen – depressive disorders, psychiatric disorders – Lusaris Therapeutics
- Midomafetamine microneedle transdermal patch (MDMA; "ecstasy") – serotonin, norepinephrine, and dopamine releasing agent, weak serotonin 5-HT_{2A}, 5-HT_{2B}, and 5-HT_{2C} receptor agonist, entactogen, and weak psychedelic hallucinogen – anxiety disorders, depressive disorders, post-traumatic stress disorder, substance-related disorders – PharmaTher, Revive Therapeutics
- MSP-4018 – serotonin 5-HT_{1A} and 5-HT_{2A} receptor agonist and psychedelic hallucinogen (5-MeO-DMT- and DMT-inspired drug) – neurological disorders, psychiatric disorders – Mindset Pharma, Otsuka America Pharmaceutical
- MSP-4019 – undefined mechanism of action (5-MeO-DMT- and DMT-inspired drug) – neurological disorders, psychiatric disorders – Mindset Pharma, Otsuka America Pharmaceutical
- MSP-4020 – undefined mechanism of action (5-MeO-DMT- and DMT-inspired drug) – neurological disorders, psychiatric disorders – Mindset Pharma, Otsuka America Pharmaceutical
- MYCO-006 – undefined mechanism of action and short-acting MDMA-like entactogen – anxiety disorders – Mydecine
- MYCO-007 – undefined mechanism of action and short-acting MDMA-like entactogen – undefined indication – Mydecine
- Non-racemic MDMA (AM-1002; 90% (R)-MDMA, 10% (S)-MDMA) – serotonin, norepinephrine, and dopamine releasing agent, weak serotonin 5-HT_{2A}, 5-HT_{2B}, 5-HT_{2C} receptor agonist, entactogen, and weak psychedelic hallucinogen – generalized anxiety disorder – Arcadia Medicine
- Norbaeocystin – non-hallucinogenic serotonin 5-HT_{2A} receptor agonist and other actions – mental disorders – PsyBio Therapeutics
- PSIL-001 (DMT analogue) – non-hallucinogenic serotonin 5-HT_{1} receptor modulator – depressive disorders, mood disorders, neurodegenerative disorders, substance-related disorders – Psilera
- PSIL-002 (DMT analogue) – non-hallucinogenic serotonin 5-HT_{1} receptor modulator – depressive disorders, mood disorders, neurodegenerative disorders, substance-related disorders – Psilera
- PSIL-006 – non-hallucinogenic serotonin 5-HT_{2A} and 5-HT_{6} receptor partial agonist – frontotemporal dementia – Psilera
- PSIL-020 – non-hallucinogenic serotonin 5-HT_{6} receptor agonist – undisclosed – Psilera
- PSIL-025 – non-hallucinogenic serotonin 5-HT_{1} receptor modulator – anxiety disorders – Psilera
- Psilacetin (O-acetylpsilocin; 4-AcO-DMT) – non-selective serotonin receptor agonist and psychedelic hallucinogen – substance-related disorders – Psilera
- Psilocin (PLZ-1015) – non-selective serotonin receptor agonist and psychedelic hallucinogen – pervasive child development disorders – Pilz Bioscience
- RE245 (RE-245) – non-hallucinogenic serotonin receptor agonist and psychoplastogen – undisclosed – Reunion Neuroscience
- Research programme: hydroxynorketamine derivatives - Spirify Pharma – amino acid modulators and serine protease modulators – depressive disorders, pain – Spirify Pharma
- Research programme: Ibogaine analogues - Gilgamesh Pharmaceuticals (GM-300X) – various actions – opioid-related disorders – Gilgamesh Pharmaceuticals
- Research programme: mental disorder therapeutics - Cybin (Deuterated DMT series - Cybin) – serotonin receptor modulators and psychedelic hallucinogens – mental disorders – Small Pharma, Helus Pharma (Cybin)
- Research programme: micro-dose serotonergics - Gilgamesh Pharmaceuticals – serotonin receptor agonists – attention-deficit hyperactivity disorder, major depressive disorder – Gilgamesh Pharmaceuticals
- Research programme: non-hallucinogenic psychedelic therapeutics - Intra-Cellular Therapies (ITI-1500) – undefined mechanism of action – psychiatric disorders – Intra-Cellular Therapies
- Research programme: psilocin derivatives - Enveric Biosciences – serotonin 5-HT_{2A} receptor agonists and potential psychedelic hallucinogens – mental disorders – Enveric Biosciences
- Research programme: psilocin prodrugs and derivatives - Terran Biosciences – serotonin 5-HT_{2A} receptor agonists and psychedelic hallucinogens – neurological disorders, psychiatric disorders – Terran Biosciences
- Research programme: psychedelic and empathogenic compounds - Terran Biosciences – serotonin receptor modulators – neurological disorders, psychiatric disorders – Terran Biosciences
- Research programme: psychedelic-based neurological therapeutics - Psilera – undefined mechanism and psychedelic hallucinogens – alcoholism, anxiety disorders, depressive disorders, neurodegenerative disorders – Psilera
- Research programme: psychedelic-based therapeutics - Clearmind Medicine/SciSparc – undefined mechanism of action – metabolic disorders, obesity, psychiatric disorders – Clearmind Medicine, SciSparc
- Research programme: psychedelic microneedle patch - PharmaTher – undefined mechanism of action – neurological disorders, neuromuscular disorders, pain, psychiatric disorders – PharmaTher
- Research programme: psychoplastogen therapeutics - Collaborations Pharmaceuticals – undefined mechanism of action – opioid-related disorders – Collaborations Pharmaceuticals
- Research programme: serotonin 2A receptor agonists - Bright Minds Biosciences – serotonin 5-HT_{2A} receptor agonists – major depressive disorder, post-traumatic stress disorder – Bright Minds Biosciences
- Research programme: serotonin 2A/C receptor agonists - Bright Minds Biosciences – serotonin 5-HT_{2A} and 5-HT_{2C} receptor agonists – pain – Bright Minds Biosciences
- Research programme: small tryptamine derivatives - Marvel Biosciences (non-hallucinogenic neuroplasticity program - Marvel Biosciences) – adenosine A_{2A} receptor antagonists – depressive disorders – Marvel Biosciences
- Research programme: SPL 029 series - Cybin (Oral DMT series - Cybin; SPL029) – non-selective serotonin receptor agonist and psychedelic hallucinogen – mental disorders – Small Pharma, Helus Pharma (Cybin)
- Serotonin 5-HT2 receptor agonists - Cybin – serotonin 5-HT_{2} receptor agonists (phenethylamines) – neurological disorders, psychiatric disorders – Helus Pharma (Cybin)
- Tabernanthalog (TBG; DLX-007; DLX-7) – non-hallucinogenic serotonin 5-HT_{2A} receptor agonist – CNS disorders – Delix Therapeutics
- TACT411 – serotonin 5-HT_{1B} receptor modulator and monoamine transporter modulator – alcohol use disorder, anorexia, binge-eating disorder – Tactogen
- TACT523 – undefined mechanism of action – alcohol use disorder, anorexia, binge-eating disorder – Tactogen
- TACT833 – serotonin 5-HT_{1B} receptor modulator and monoamine transporter modulator – alcohol use disorder, anorexia, binge-eating disorder – Tactogen
- TACT908 – serotonin 5-HT_{1B} receptor agonist and non-hallucinogenic serotonin 5-HT_{2A} receptor partial agonist – cluster headache – Tactogen
- TN-001 – non-hallucinogenic serotonin 5-HT_{2A} receptor partial agonist and serotonin 5-HT_{2B} receptor antagonist and neuroplastogen – major depressive disorder, post-traumatic stress disorder – Transneural Therapeutics, CaaMTech
- XYL-1001 (PSYLO-1001; PSYLO-100X) – non-hallucinogenic serotonin 5-HT_{2A} and 5-HT_{6} receptor modulator and psychoplastogen – mental disorders – Psylo/Xylo
- XYL-1002 (PSYLO-1002; Psylo-1002) – non-hallucinogenic serotonin 5-HT_{2A} receptor agonist, other actions, and psychoplastogen – anxiety disorders – Psylo/Xylo
- XYL-3001 (XYL-300X; PSYLO-3001; Psylo-3001) – non-hallucinogenic non-selective serotonin receptor agonist and psychoplastogen – depressive disorders, generalized anxiety disorder, social phobia – Psylo/Xylo
- XYL-4001 (XYL-400X; PSYLO-4001; Psylo-4001) – non-hallucinogenic serotonin 5-HT_{2A} receptor agonist and psychoplastogen – depressive disorders, major depressive disorder – Psylo/Xylo

=== Research ===
- AM-1004 – undefined mechanism of action (short-acting psychoactive/entactogen combination) – major depressive disorder – Arcadia Medicine
- AM-1006 – undefined mechanism of action (short-acting subperceptual psychoactive drug) – substance use disorders – Arcadia Medicine
- ASR-2001 (2CB-5PrO) – non-hallucinogenic serotonin 5-HT_{2A} and 5-HT_{1B} receptor agonist – psychiatric disorders – Alexander Shulgin Research Institute
- ASR-3001 (5-MeO-iPALT) – non-selective serotonin receptor agonist and psychedelic hallucinogen – psychiatric disorders – Alexander Shulgin Research Institute
- Baeocystin (PLZ-1019) – non-hallucinogenic serotonin 5-HT_{2A} receptor agonist and other actions – pervasive developmental disorders in children – Pilz Bioscience
- Bufotenin (bufotenine) – non-selective serotonin receptor agonist and psychedelic hallucinogen – undisclosed – Usona Institute
- HLP005 (HLP-005; CYB005; deuterated phenethylamine derivative) – undefined mechanism of action ("non-hallucinogenic doses") – psychiatric disorders – Helus Pharma (Cybin)
- Ibogaine – various actions – anorexia nervosa, neurological disorders, substance-related disorders – Biomind Labs
- LSR-3000 – undefined mechanism of action (tryptamine serotonergic neuroplastogen) – neurological disorders – Lusaris Therapeutics
- Lysergic acid diethylamide (LSD; lysergide; LSD-CUREfilm) – non-selective serotonin receptor agonist and psychedelic hallucinogen – mental disorders – CURE Pharmaceutical
- Mebufotenin (5-MeO-DMT; LSR-2000) – non-selective serotonin receptor agonist and psychedelic hallucinogen – alcoholism, major depressive disorder – Lusaris Therapeutics
- Mescaline (BMND-04/BMND04) – non-selective serotonin receptor agonist and psychedelic hallucinogen – eating disorders, neurological disorders – Biomind Labs
- Midomafetamine (MDMA; "ecstasy"; MDMA-CUREfilm) – serotonin, norepinephrine, and dopamine releasing agent, weak serotonin 5-HT_{2A}, 5-HT_{2B}, and 5-HT_{2C} receptor agonist, entactogen, and weak psychedelic hallucinogen – mental disorders – CURE Pharmaceutical
- MYCO-002 – undefined mechanism of action and MDMA-like entactogen – mental disorders – Mydecine
- MYCO-004 (patch-delivered tryptamine compound) – undefined mechanism of action and psychedelic hallucinogen – smoking withdrawal, substance-related disorders – Mydecine
- MYCO-005 (psilocin analogue) – serotonin 5-HT_{2A} receptor agonist and psychedelic hallucinogen – anxiety disorders, depressive disorders – Mydecine
- N-Methyltryptamine (NMT; monomethyltryptamine) – undefined mechanism of action and psychedelic hallucinogen – unspecified – Core One Labs
- Noribogaine derived therapeutic – various actions – opioid-related disorders – Definium Therapeutics (MindMed), Nextage Therapeutics
- Norpsilocin (PLZ-1017) – non-hallucinogenic serotonin 5-HT_{2A} receptor agonist and other actions – pervasive developmental disorders in children – Pilz Bioscience
- Psilocybin – non-selective serotonin receptor agonist and psychedelic hallucinogen – cancer – Dominari Holdings
- PSYLO-5001 (Psylo-5001) – non-hallucinogenic serotonin 5-HT_{2A} receptor agonist and psychoplastogen – mental disorders – Psylo/Xylo
- Research programme: 3,4-Methylenedioxymetamfetamine derivatives - Enveric Biosciences – serotonin, norepinephrine, and/or dopamine releasing agents and entactogens – mental disorders, neurological disorders, psychotic disorders – MagicMed Industries, Enveric Biosciences
- Research programme: Ibogaine derivatives - MindMed/Nextage Therapeutics – various actions and potential hallucinogens – opioid-related disorders – Definium Therapeutics (MindMed), Nextage Therapeutics
- Research programme: lysergic acid diethylamide derivatives - Enveric Biosciences – serotonin 5-HT_{2A} receptor agonists – mental disorders, neurological disorders, psychotic disorders – MagicMed Industries, Enveric Biosciences
- Research programme: mescaline derivatives - Enveric Biosciences – serotonin 5-HT_{2} receptor agonists – mental disorders, neurological disorders – MagicMed Industries, Enveric Biosciences
- Research programme: non-hallucinogenic psychedelic therapeutics - Sintalica Bioscience/University of Messina – undefined mechanism of action and non-hallucinogenic tryptamine serotonergic agents – Sintalica Bioscience, University of Messina
- Research programme: psychiatric disorder therapies (neuroplastogens) - AbbVie/Gilgamesh Pharmaceuticals – undefined mechanism of action – psychiatric disorders – AbbVie, Gilgamesh Pharmaceuticals
- Research programme: non-hallucinogenic psychiatric therapies - Daiichi Sankyo/Psylo – undefined mechanism of action – mental disorders – Daiichi Sankyo, Psylo/Xylo
- Research programme: non-tryptamine psychedelic small molecules - Otsuka America Pharmaceutical – serotonin receptor modulators – neurological disorders, psychiatric disorders – Mindset Pharma, Otsuka America Pharmaceutical
- Research programme: psychedelic and empathogenic therapeutics - COMPASS Pathways – undefined mechanism of action – mental disorders – COMPASS Pathways, MiHKAL
- Research programme: psychedelic and empathogenic compounds subcutaneous - Bexson Biomedical – undefined mechanism of action – depressive disorders, mental disorders, pain, post-traumatic stress disorder, substance-related disorders – Bexson Biomedical
- Research programme: psychedelic therapeutics - COMPASS Discovery Center – serotonin 5-HT_{2A} receptor modulators – mental disorders – COMPASS Discovery Center, COMPASS Pathways
- Research programme: tryptamine analog therapeutics - Diamond Therapeutics – serotonin receptor modulators – Diamond Therapeutics
- SPT-348 – serotonin receptor modulator and non-hallucinogenic psychoplastogen (prodrug of 2-bromo-LSD) – mood disorders, depression and anxiety, neuropsychiatric disorders – Seaport Therapeutics

== Not under development ==
=== Development suspended ===
- Esketamine ((S)-ketamine; AM-101; esketamine otic gel; Keyzilen) – ionotropic glutamate NMDA receptor antagonist and dissociative hallucinogen – tinnitus – Altamira Therapeutics

=== No development reported ===
- 2C-iBu (ELE-02) – serotonin 5-HT_{2A} receptor agonist, psychedelic hallucinogen, and anti-inflammatory agent – inflammation – Eleusis
- Arketamine ((R)-ketamine; HR-071603; (R)-ketamine nasal spray) – ionotropic glutamate NMDA receptor antagonist and dissociative hallucinogen – depressive disorders – Jiangsu Hengrui Medicine
- Esketamine ((S)-ketamine; esketamine DPI; Falkieri; PG061) – ionotropic glutamate NMDA receptor antagonist and dissociative hallucinogen – bipolar depression, depressive disorders – Celon Pharma
- Esketamine ((S)-ketamine; IPX-237, IPX237-C0001, IPX237-C0002, IPX237-L0001) – ionotropic glutamate NMDA receptor antagonist and dissociative hallucinogen – unspecified – IMPAX Laboratories, Amneal Laboratories
- Hydroxynorketamine ((2R,6R)-hydroxynorketamine; 6-HNK; SPL-801-B) – unknown mechanism of action (non-hallucinogenic ketamine derivative and metabolite) – depressive disorders – Small Pharma, Helus Pharma (Cybin)
- Ketamine (ELE-Ket+) – ionotropic glutamate NMDA receptor antagonist and dissociative hallucinogen – major depressive disorder – Beckley Psytech
- Ketamine intranasal – ionotropic glutamate NMDA receptor antagonist and dissociative hallucinogen – cluster headaches – CCH Pharmaceuticals
- Ketamine intravenous/oral (Braxia) – ionotropic glutamate NMDA receptor antagonist and dissociative hallucinogen – depressive disorders – Braxia Scientific
- Ketamine sublingual (ketamine wafer; SLS-003; Wafermine) – ionotropic glutamate NMDA receptor antagonist and dissociative hallucinogen – acute pain, dental pain, pain, depressive disorders – iX Biopharma
- Ketamine transdermal patch (SHX-001) – ionotropic glutamate NMDA receptor antagonist and dissociative hallucinogen – major depressive disorder – Shenox Pharmaceuticals
- Midomafetamine (MDMA; "ecstasy") – serotonin, norepinephrine, and dopamine releasing agent, weak serotonin 5-HT_{2A}, 5-HT_{2B}, and 5-HT_{2C} receptor agonist, entactogen, and weak psychedelic hallucinogen – mood disorders, substance-related disorders – Definium Therapeutics (MindMed)
- Psilocybin (biosynthetic psilocybin; PB-1818) – non-selective serotonin receptor agonist and psychedelic hallucinogen – depressive disorders – PsyBio Therapeutics
- Psilocybin (low-dose psilocybin; BPL-PSILO) – non-selective serotonin receptor agonist and psychedelic hallucinogen – headache – Beckley Psytech
- Research programme: ketamine derivatives - Shenox Pharmaceuticals (SHX-004; SHX-004/005/006/007/011; SHX-005; SHX-006; SHX-007; SHX-011) – ionotropic glutamate NMDA receptor antagonists and dissociative hallucinogens – major depressive disorder, neuropathic pain – Shenox Pharmaceuticals
- Research programme: serotonin psychedelics - Mydecine Innovations Group – serotonin modulators and psychedelic hallucinogens – mental disorders – Mydecine
- Research programme: tryptamine based therapeutics - PsyBio Therapeutics – serotonin 5-HT_{2A} receptor agonists – anxiety disorders, depressive disorders, post-traumatic stress disorder, substance-related disorders – PsyBio Therapeutics
- XW-10508 (oral esketamine conjugate prodrug) – ionotropic glutamate NMDA receptor antagonist and dissociative hallucinogen – major depressive disorder, pain – XWPharma

=== Development discontinued ===
- Ketamine (Ketals) – ionotropic glutamate NMDA receptor antagonist and dissociative hallucinogen – amyotrophic lateral sclerosis, anaesthesia, drug-induced dyskinesia, Rett syndrome – PharmaTher
- Ketamine intranasal – ionotropic glutamate NMDA receptor antagonist and dissociative hallucinogen – autistic disorder – Roivant Sciences
- NIN-S119 – serotonin 5-HT_{2A} receptor agonist and psychedelic hallucinogen (short-acting tryptamine) – Ninnion Therapeutics
- Research programme: ketamine deuterated - Teva Pharmaceutical Industries – ionotropic glutamate NMDA receptor antagonist and dissociative hallucinogen – pain – Teva Pharmaceutical Industries
- Salvinorin A (INT0054/2020; RLS-01) – κ-opioid receptor agonist – depressive disorders, unspecified – Revixia Life Sciences IntelGenx Corp

==== 20th century (1940s–1980s) ====
- 3-(2-Aminopropyl)benzo(β)thiophene (3-APBT; SKF-6678) – serotonin–norepinephrine–dopamine releasing agent, serotonin 5-HT_{2A}, 5-HT_{2B}, and 5-HT_{2C} receptor agonist, and psychedelic hallucinogen – "ataractic, psychic energizer, analgetic" – Smith, Kline & French
- (R)-Ariadne (BL-3912A; Dimoxamine) – non-hallucinogenic serotonin 5-HT_{2A}, 5-HT_{2B}, and 5-HT_{2C} receptor agonist – depression – Bristol-Myers Company
- Diethyltryptamine (DET; T-9) – non-selective serotonin receptor agonist and psychedelic hallucinogen – unknown – unknown
- 2,5-Dimethoxy-4-bromoamphetamine (DOB; brolamfetamine) – serotonin 5-HT_{2A}, 5-HT_{2B}, and 5-HT_{2C} receptor agonist and psychedelic hallucinogen – unknown – unknown
- 2,5-Dimethoxy-4-ethylamphetamine (DOET) – serotonin 5-HT_{2A}, 5-HT_{2B}, and 5-HT_{2C} receptor agonist and psychedelic hallucinogen – unknown – Dow Chemical Company
- 2,5-Dimethoxy-4-methylamphetamine (DOM; K-61,082) – serotonin 5-HT_{2A}, 5-HT_{2B}, and 5-HT_{2C} receptor agonist and psychedelic hallucinogen – unknown – Dow Chemical Company
- Ethocybin (4-PO-DET; CEY-19) – non-selective serotonin receptor agonist and psychedelic hallucinogen – unknown – Sandoz
- 4-Hydroxy-N,N-diethyltryptamine (4-HO-DET; CZ-74) – non-selective serotonin receptor agonist and psychedelic hallucinogen – unknown – Sandoz
- 4-Hydroxy-α-methyltryptamine (4-HO-AMT; MP-14) – undefined mechanism of action – unknown – unknown
- Lysergic acid diethylamide (LSD; LSD-25; lysergide; Delysid) – non-selective serotonin receptor agonist and psychedelic hallucinogen – various uses – Sandoz
- Mescaline (mezcalin) – serotonin 5-HT_{2A}, 5-HT_{2B}, and 5-HT_{2C} receptor agonist and psychedelic hallucinogen – various uses – Merck
- 4-Methyl-α-methyltryptamine (4-Me-AMT; MP-809) – undefined mechanism of action – depression – Sandoz
- 3,4-Methylenedioxyamphetamine (MDA; SKF-5; Amphedoxamine) – serotonin, norepinephrine, and dopamine releasing agent, weak serotonin 5-HT_{2A}, 5-HT_{2B}, and 5-HT_{2C} receptor agonist, entactogen, and weak psychedelic hallucinogen – appetite suppressant – Smith, Kline, & French
- 3,4-Methylenedioxyamphetamine (MDA; tenamfetamine) – serotonin, norepinephrine, and dopamine releasing agent, weak serotonin 5-HT_{2A}, 5-HT_{2B}, and 5-HT_{2C} receptor agonist, entactogen, and weak psychedelic hallucinogen – unknown – unknown
- Psilocin (4-HO-DMT; CX-59) – non-selective serotonin receptor agonist and psychedelic hallucinogen – various uses – Sandoz
- Psilocybin (4-PO-DMT; CY-39; Indocybin) – non-selective serotonin receptor agonist and psychedelic hallucinogen – various uses – Sandoz

=== Formal development never or not yet started ===
- Nitrous oxide (N_{2}O; "laughing gas") – ionotropic glutamate NMDA receptor antagonist and dissociative hallucinogen – being studied for depression but doesn't seem to be being formally developed towards approval

== Other related drugs ==
- 1Z2MAP1O
- 1ZP2MA
- 4-Allyl-6-oxa-noribogainalog
- 5-Chloro-αMT (PAL-542)
- 5-Fluoro-AMT (5F-AMT; PAL-212, PAL-544)
- 5-MAPB
- 6-MAPB
- 5-MAPBT
- 5-MeO-DMT-d4
- 5-MBPB (5-MPBP, 5-MABB)
- 6-MBPB (6-MPBP, 6-MABB)
- BFAI
- BK-5-MAPB
- BK-6-MAPB
- BK-5Br-NM-AMT
- BK-5Cl-NM-AMT
- BK-5F-NM-AMT
- BK-NM-AMT
- CPI-CG-8
- CYB210010 (2C-T-TFM; 2C-T-36)
- d2-MDMA
- DLX-2270
- DMT-d4
- Gaboxadol (THIP; LU-02030, MK-0928, OV-101)
- HBL20016 (5-MeS-6-F-DMT)
- Ibogainalog (IBG)
- Ibogaminalog (DM-506)
- IHCH-7079
- IHCH-7086
- IHCH-7113
- (R)-MDDMA
- MK-212
- Noribogainalog
- JRT
- Lisuride
- ODMA
- ORG-12962
- ORG-37684
- Oxa-noribogaine
- Pharm-136
- RE-109 (O-glutarylpsilocin; 4-GO-DMT)
- PNU-22394 (U-22394A)
- Ro60-0175 (Ro-600175)
- SDA (3T-MDA)
- SDMA (3T-MDMA)
- SeDMA
- TDMA
- TRALA-12 (likely didehydro-LSD or DDH-LSD)
- UH-232

== Clinically used drugs ==
=== Approved drugs ===
- Bupropion/dextromethorphan (DXM/BUP; Auvelity) – sigma σ_{1} receptor agonist, serotonin reuptake inhibitor, norepinephrine and dopamine reuptake inhibitor, nicotinic acetylcholine receptor negative allosteric modulator, ionotropic glutamate NMDA receptor antagonist, other actions, CYP2D6 inhibitor, and dissociative hallucinogen combination – major depressive disorder – Axsome Therapeutics
- Esketamine ((S)-ketamine; Spravato) – ionotropic glutamate NMDA receptor antagonist and dissociative hallucinogen – major depressive disorder – Johnson & Johnson

=== Off-label drugs ===
- Ketamine – ionotropic glutamate NMDA receptor antagonist and dissociative hallucinogen – major depressive disorder, other depressive disorders, and other conditions

=== Discontinued drugs ===
- α-Methyltryptamine (Indopan; αMT; AMT) – serotonin–norepinephrine–dopamine releasing agent, non-selective serotonin receptor agonist, weak monoamine oxidase inhibitor, entactogen, and psychedelic hallucinogen – depression – unknown (marketed in the Soviet Union)
- Etryptamine (Monase; α-ethyltryptamine; αET; AET) – serotonin–norepinephrine–dopamine releasing agent, serotonin receptor agonist, weak monoamine oxidase inhibitor, and entactogen – depression – Upjohn
- Tabernanthe spp. extracts (containing ibogaine) (Lambarène, Iperton) – various actions and stimulant – fatigue, asthenia, depression, illness recovery

=== Other drugs ===
- Efavirenz (Sustiva) – has serotonergic psychedelic effects at supratherapeutic doses
- Ergonovine (ergometrine; Ergotrate) – has serotonergic psychedelic effects at supratherapeutic doses
- Fenfluramine (Pondimin, Fintepla) – has serotonergic psychedelic effects at supratherapeutic doses
- Lisuride (Dopergin) – has reported hallucinogenic effects at supratherapeutic doses
- Lorcaserin (Belviq; APD-356) – has serotonergic psychedelic effects at supratherapeutic doses
- Methylergometrine (methylergonovine; Methergine) – has serotonergic psychedelic effects at supratherapeutic doses
- Methysergide (Deseril, Sansert; UML-491) – has serotonergic psychedelic effects at supratherapeutic doses

== See also ==
- List of investigational drugs
- List of psychedelic pharmaceutical companies
- Psychedelic treatments for trauma-related disorders
- Ketamine-assisted psychotherapy
- List of hallucinogens
- List of psychedelic drugs
- List of entactogens
- Psychedelic Alpha
- Timeline of psychedelic legalization and decriminalization
