= EB-003 =

Clinical data
- Other names: EB003
- Drug class: Non-hallucinogenic serotonin receptor agonist; Psychoplastogen; Neurostabilogen

EB-003 is a non-hallucinogenic serotonin receptor agonist which is under development for the treatment of depressive disorders and anxiety disorders. It is a tryptamine and a derivative of the serotonergic psychedelic dimethyltryptamine (DMT).

The drug acts as a non-selective agonist of serotonin receptors, including of the serotonin 5-HT_{1A}, 5-HT_{1B}, and 5-HT_{2A} receptors. It is not a serotonin 5-HT_{2B} receptor agonist. EB-003 produces psychoplastogenic effects. Due to targeting not only the serotonin 5-HT_{2A} receptor but also the serotonin 5-HT_{1B} receptor to influence neuroplasticity, EB-003 has been branded a new type of drug called a "neurostabilogen" by its developer.

EB-003 is being developed by Enveric Biosciences. As of February 2025, it is in the preclinical research stage of development. A phase 1 clinical trial is being planned. The drug's exact chemical structure does not yet seem to have been disclosed. It has been patented, though the patent does not yet appear to have been published.

== See also ==
- EB-002
- List of investigational hallucinogens and entactogens
- List of investigational antidepressants
- Non-hallucinogenic 5-HT_{2A} receptor agonist
