= RE245 =

Clinical data
- Other names: RE-245
- Routes of administration: Oral
- Drug class: Serotonin receptor modulator; Non-hallucinogenic serotonin 5-HT_{2A} receptor agonist; Psychoplastogen

RE245, or RE-245, is a non-hallucinogenic psychoplastogen which is under development for the treatment of psychiatric disorders. It is taken orally. The drug acts as a serotonin receptor modulator, including of the serotonin 5-HT_{2A} receptor, and is said to have psychoplastogenic effects. It is being developed by Reunion Neuroscience. As of August 2025, RE245 is in the preclinical research stage of development. An Investigational New Drug (IND) application to allow for phase 1 clinical trials is planned to be submitted in 2026, with these studies expected to start in 2027. The chemical structure of RE245 does not yet appear to have been disclosed.

== See also ==
- Non-hallucinogenic 5-HT_{2A} receptor agonist
- List of investigational hallucinogens and entactogens
- Luvesilocin (RE104; FT-104; 4-GO-DiPT)
