= Inidascamine =

Clinical data
- Other names: RL-007; RL007; FSV7-007
- Routes of administration: Oral

Identifiers
- IUPAC name: (2R,3S)-2-amino-3-hydroxy-3-pyridin-4-yl-1-pyrrolidin-1-ylpropan-1-one
- CAS Number: 903884-71-9
- PubChem CID: 11535990
- ChemSpider: 9710771
- UNII: 3LW01V88B7
- ChEMBL: ChEMBL5095258
- CompTox Dashboard (EPA): DTXSID90238113

Chemical and physical data
- Formula: C_{12}H_{17}N_{3}O_{2}
- Molar mass: 235.287 g·mol^{−1}
- 3D model (JSmol): Interactive image
- SMILES: C1CCN(C1)C(=O)[C@@H]([C@H](C2=CC=NC=C2)O)N
- InChI: InChI=1S/C12H17N3O2/c13-10(12(17)15-7-1-2-8-15)11(16)9-3-5-14-6-4-9/h3-6,10-11,16H,1-2,7-8,13H2/t10-,11+/m1/s1; Key:GRZMKKUGHIECFK-MNOVXSKESA-N

Inidascamine (INN; developmental code names RL-007, FSV7-007) is an experimental drug which is under development for the treatment of cognitive impairment associated with schizophrenia (CIAS). It is taken orally. The drug is said to act on the cholinergic, NMDA, and GABA_{B} receptor systems. Inidascamine is being developed by Recognify Life Sciences and atai Life Sciences. It was discovered via screening of compounds for effects on synaptic plasticity and cognition. The drug shows structural similarities to phenethylamines and amphetamines.

== See also ==
- List of investigational antipsychotics
- List of investigational cognition and memory disorder drugs
