= MDMA/citalopram =

- MDMA

- Citalopram

Combination of
- MDMA: Entactogen; Serotonin–norepinephrine–dopamine releasing agent
- Citalopram: Antidepressant; Selective serotonin reuptake inhibitor

Clinical data
- Other names: Citalopram/MDMA; Midomafetamine/citalopram; Citalopram/midomafetamine
- Routes of administration: Oral

MDMA/citalopram is a combination of the entactogen and monoamine releasing agent 3,4-methylenedioxymethamphetamine (MDMA; also known as midomafetamine or "ecstasy") and the selective serotonin reuptake inhibitor (SSRI) citalopram which is under development for the treatment of post-traumatic stress disorder (PTSD).

Citalopram is taken after MDMA in the combination, and its inclusion is intended to help reduce the well-known negative after-effects of MDMA such as temporarily worsened mood (sometimes referred to colloquially as "Blue Mondays"). MDMA has been found to produce serotonin depletion and neurotoxicity in animals, and this may be importantly involved in its negative after-effects.

Pretreatment with or simultaneous coadministration of SSRIs with MDMA has been found to markedly attenuate most of the psychoactive and physiological effects of MDMA in humans. This is because SSRIs block MDMA-induced serotonin release, which is the key action of MDMA involved in mediating its effects. In addition to blocking the serotonin release and effects of MDMA, SSRIs fully block the serotonergic neurotoxicity of MDMA in animals. However, delayed administration of SSRIs as late as 3 to 4 hours after MDMA administration is still able to fully block MDMA's serotonergic neurotoxicity in animals. Conversely, administration of an SSRI 6 hours after MDMA is partially protective, while administration 12 hours after MDMA is ineffective. The duration of MDMA in humans is 3 to 6 hours, although most of its effects occur in the first 4 hours after dosing. By supplementing citalopram a few hours after MDMA in human MDMA users, the serotonergic neurotoxicity and negative after-effects of MDMA may be prevented or diminished while still allowing MDMA to produce most of its desired effects.

In a small preliminary clinical study of MDMA users who reported typically experiencing a comedown after MDMA, it was found that MDMA produced acute cognitive deficits 5 and 26 hours after administration and the deficits could be prevented by administration of citalopram (20 mg orally) 3 hours after MDMA. In addition, the desired acute effects of MDMA were not noticeably altered by post-MDMA citalopram intake.

The combination is under development by Tactogen. Following the Food and Drug Administration (FDA)'s rejection of Lykos Therapeutics's MDMA formulation for PTSD, Tactogen has said that it is seriously considering prioritizing novel compounds over MDMA. Phase 2 clinical trials of MDMA/citalopram are planned to begin in 2026.

== See also ==
- List of investigational hallucinogens and entactogens
- List of investigational post-traumatic stress disorder drugs
- d2-MDMA
