= Ketamine/temsirolimus =

- Ketamine

- Temsirolimus

Combination of
- Ketamine: NMDA receptor antagonist
- Temsirolimus: mTOR inhibitor

Clinical data
- Other names: FREE-001; FREE001; Temsirolimus/ketamine

Ketamine/temsirolimus (developmental code name FREE001 or FREE-001) is a combination of ketamine, an NMDA receptor antagonist, and temsirolimus, a mammalian target of rapamycin (mTOR) inhibitor, which is under development for the treatment of major depressive disorder. It is being developed to prolong the antidepressant effects of ketamine and esketamine, by 2 to 3 times, from 2 to 7 days to 14 days in terms of preliminary clinical findings. The combination is being developed by Freedom Biosciences. As of April 2024, it is in phase 2 clinical trials.

== See also ==
- List of investigational antidepressants
- List of investigational hallucinogens and entactogens
