= Psychedelic Alpha =

- Formerly: Psilocybin Alpha
- Industry: Psychedelic industry
- Founded: 2020; 6 years ago
- Founder: Josh Hardman
- Website: psychedelicalpha.com

Psychedelic Alpha (Pα), formerly known as Psilocybin Alpha, is a website, independent media outlet, and consultancy firm in the area of the psychedelic drug industry. The coverage of Psychedelic Alpha includes business and drug development, policy reform, and scientific research in the area of psychedelic drugs, among other topics. Some of its notable projects include a weekly newsletter, a psychedelic drug development tracker, and a psychedelic law and policy tracker. The founder and editor of Psychedelic Alpha is Josh Hardman, who started the site in 2020.

== See also ==
- List of psychedelic news and media organizations
- List of investigational hallucinogens and entactogens
- List of psychedelic pharmaceutical companies
