= EGX-B =

Clinical data
- Other names: EGXB
- Drug class: Serotonin 5-HT_{2A} receptor agonist; Serotonergic psychedelic; Hallucinogen

EGX-B is a serotonin 5-HT_{2A} receptor agonist and putative serotonergic psychedelic which is under development for the treatment of depressive disorders. It acts as a agonist of the serotonin 5-HT_{2A} receptor, shows high selectivity (>100-fold) for the serotonin 5-HT_{2A} receptor over the serotonin 5-HT_{2B} receptor, is much more potent as a serotonin 5-HT_{2A} receptor agonist than psilocin, and produces the head-twitch response, a behavioral proxy of psychedelic effects, in rodents. The drug is being developed by atai Life Sciences and EntheogeniX Biosciences. As of December 2023, it is in the preclinical research stage of development.

== See also ==
- List of investigational hallucinogens and entactogens
- List of investigational antidepressants
