= EQL-101 =

Clinical data
- Other names: EQL101
- Drug class: Non-hallucinogenic and non-cardiotoxic ibogaine analogue

EQL-101 is a non-hallucinogenic ibogaine analogue which is under development for the treatment of substance use disorders such as opioid use disorder. It is said to preserve the therapeutic activity of ibogaine but to lack its hallucinogenic effects as well as certain adverse effects like cardiotoxicity. The drug is under development by Equulus Therapeutics. As of 2025, it is in the discovery or preclinical research stage of development.

== See also ==
- List of investigational hallucinogens and entactogens
- List of investigational substance-related disorder drugs
