= GM-5022 =

Clinical data
- Other names: GM5022
- Routes of administration: Oral
- Drug class: Psychoplastogen
- ATC code: None

GM-5022 is a non-hallucinogenic psychoplastogen which is under development for the treatment of depressive, anxiety, and other neurological disorders. It is taken orally. The drug's specific mechanism of action and chemical structure do not appear to have been disclosed yet. GM-5022 is under development by Gilgamesh Pharmaceuticals. As of May 2026, a Phase 1 study is currently evaluating the safety, tolerability, and pharmacokinetics of GM-5022 in healthy volunteers.

== See also ==
- List of investigational hallucinogens and entactogens
- Gilgamesh Pharmaceuticals
