= Douglas Pharmaceuticals =

New Zealand-based pharmaceutical products manufacturer

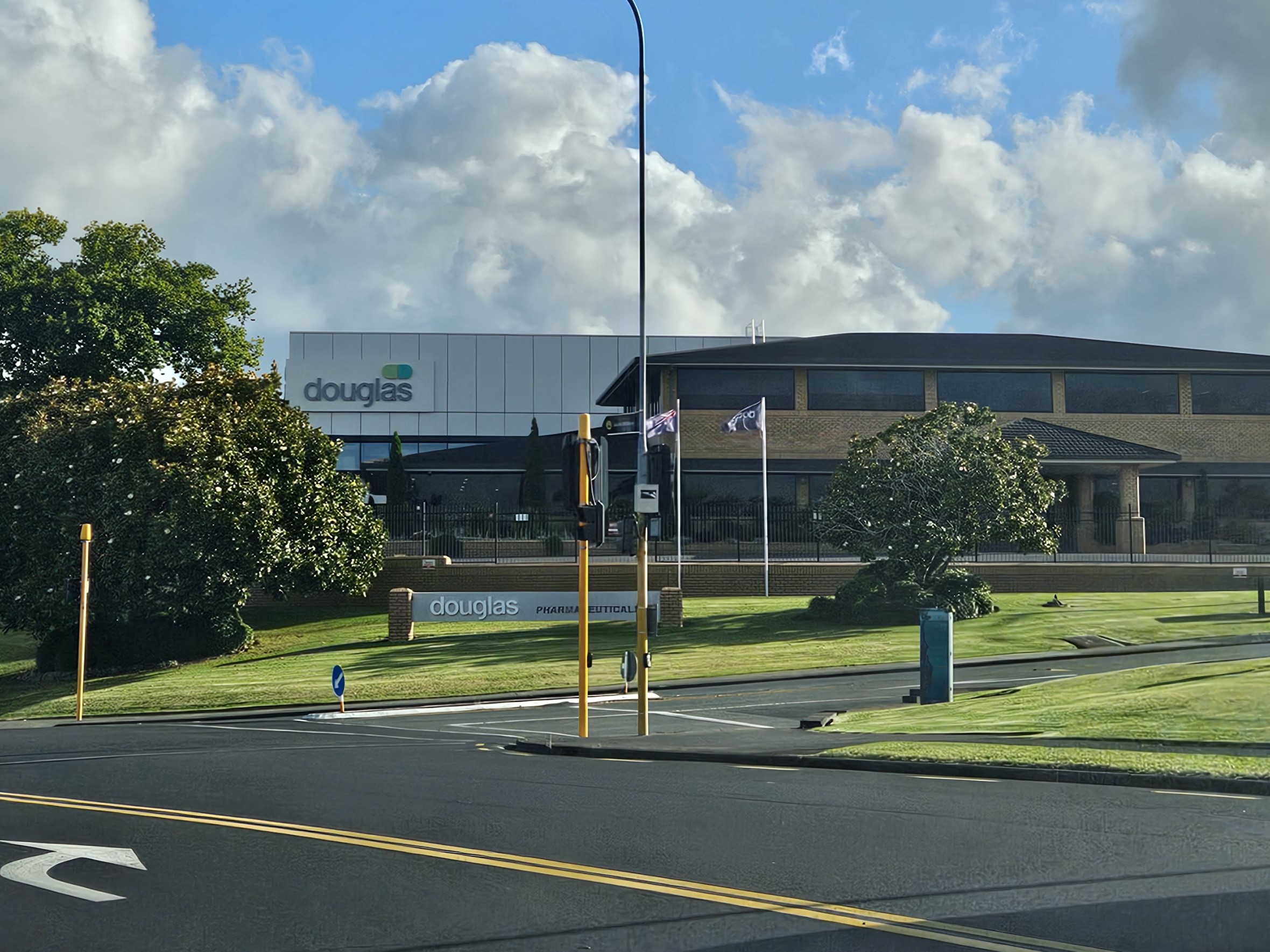
- Douglas Pharmaceuticals Head Office in Henderson, Auckland
- Type: Privately held
- Industry: Pharmaceuticals
- Founded: 1967
- Founder: Sir Graeme Douglas
- Headquarters: Auckland, New Zealand
- Number of locations: New Zealand, United States
- Area served: Worldwide
- Key people: Sir Graeme Douglas, Jeff Douglas, Sean Westbrook
- Products: Pharmaceutical products, including Isotretinoin, Clozapine and Clozapine suspension, Bexarotene and Azathioprine
- Services: Global drug out-licensing, drug in-licensing for New Zealand in Australia, drug co-development, drug brand representation, contract development and manufacturing (Douglas CDMO), drug pre-formulation, formulation, analytical testing, clinical and commercial manufacturing, clinical packaging and supply chain, regulatory consulting.
- Revenue: NZ$143m
- Total assets: NZ$80m
- Number of employees: 495
- Website: Douglas Pharmaceuticals Douglas CDMO

Douglas Pharmaceuticals Ltd is a New Zealand-based manufacturer of pharmaceutical products. Founded in 1967 by West Auckland chemist Graeme Douglas, the company started out distributing prescription medicines, before manufacturing and later successfully researching and developing its own products for export.

== History ==
1967–1990: Foundation and early growth

Douglas Pharmaceuticals began when founder Graeme Douglas created a cough syrup called Kofsin while working as a chemist in Te Atatū, West Auckland. As demand grew, the company contracted manufacturing chemists to maintain supply. The company subsequently began importing niche pharmaceuticals, packaging them at Douglas's chemist shop, and distributing them to other pharmacists.

In the early 1970s, Douglas sold his chemist shop, which had reached over $2 million in revenue, to focus exclusively on the pharmaceutical business. By the late 1980s, Douglas Pharmaceuticals sold over 40 products and recorded a revenue of $25 million, which grew to more than $70 million over the following decade.

1990–2014: International expansion and leadership transition

In 2005, the company opened a manufacturing facility in Nadi, Fiji, to produce tablets, capsules, and powder products for international export markets. During this period, Douglas Pharmaceuticals expanded into consumer products, including the Clinicians nutraceuticals range and Phloe for bowel health.

In 2012, Graeme Douglas's eldest son, Jeff Douglas, took over the day-to-day operations of the company. In 2014, Graeme Douglas officially stepped down and Jeff Douglas was appointed Managing Director.

Founder Sir Graeme Douglas died on 1 September 2016, at which time the company employed more than 450 people and distributed products to 35 countries.

Under Jeff Douglas, the company increased exports of its flagship product, softgel isotretinoin, to the United States and to Europe.

Tasman Therapeutics, a subsidiary and spin-out of Douglas Pharmaceuticals, was established during this time to develop ketamine (R-107) for treatment-resistant depression.

2014–present: Modern developments and restructuring

In July 2022, the Sir Graeme Douglas Memorial Garden was opened at the company's head office in Henderson, featuring a custom rose variety bred by Sam McGredy at Graeme Douglas's request.

In September 2022, the company opened the "Douglas Innovation" building, a 4,500-square-metre, $50 million research and development centre featuring pilot-scale product development suites, commercial manufacturing rooms, and a dedicated cytotoxic waste containment system.

By 2024, the company's workforce grew to over 650 people, manufacturing 40 products sold across more than 50 countries. The company's primary therapeutic focus areas included oncology, dermatology, the central nervous system (CNS), immunity, and immuno-suppression.

Early that year, the company launched Douglas CDMO, a contract development and manufacturing organisation focused on the development and registration of specialty generic medicines for international markets, including the United States and the European Union.

In late 2025, the company underwent a corporate restructuring to separate its core pharmaceuticals and novel drug development operations from its consumer and nutraceuticals division, spinning the latter off into a new entity named Healthcare by Douglas.

This division reduced the direct headcount of Douglas Pharmaceuticals to just under 500 employees, though both entities remain family-owned and co-located in Henderson.

In 2026, Sean Westbrook became Chief Executive Officer of Douglas Pharmaceuticals, and Jeff Douglas stepped into the role of Executive Director.

== Awards and recognition ==
2025: Won the inaugural New Zealand Manufacturer of the Year Award, presented by Advancing Manufacturing Aotearoa.

2026: Managing Director Jeff Douglas received the inaugural Manufacturing Lifetime and Legacy Award for his 30-year tenure and commitment to retaining high-value R&D and manufacturing within New Zealand.

2026: Named the "Most Inspiring Workplace in Australasia" at the regional Inspiring Workplaces Awards.
