= EGX-A =

Clinical data
- Other names: EGXA
- Drug class: Serotonin 5-HT_{2A} receptor agonist; Serotonergic psychedelic; Hallucinogen

EGX-A is a serotonin 5-HT_{2A} receptor agonist and putative serotonergic psychedelic which is under development for the treatment of depressive disorders. It acts as a full agonist of the serotonin 5-HT_{2A} receptor, shows high selectivity (>100-fold) for the serotonin 5-HT_{2A} receptor over the serotonin 5-HT_{2B} receptor, is much more potent as a serotonin 5-HT_{2A} receptor agonist than psilocin, produces the head-twitch response, a behavioral proxy of psychedelic effects, in rodents, and produces antidepressant-like effects in rodents. The drug is being developed by atai Life Sciences and EntheogeniX Biosciences. As of January 2024, it is in the preclinical research stage of development.

== See also ==
- List of investigational hallucinogens and entactogens
- List of investigational antidepressants
