= MYCO-004 =

Psychedelic drug

Clinical data
- Other names: MYCO004
- Routes of administration: Transdermal (patch)
- Drug class: Serotonin 5-HT_{2A} receptor agonist; Serotonergic psychedelic; Hallucinogen

MYCO-004 is a patch-delivered psychedelic tryptamine which is under development for the treatment of psychiatric disorders. It is anticipated to allow for precision dosing and to have a short duration of approximately 2 hours. The drug is being developed by Mydecine. As of December 2021, it is in preclinical research for psychiatric disorders. The exact chemical structure of MYCO-004 does not yet seem to have been disclosed.

== See also ==
- Substituted tryptamine
- List of investigational hallucinogens and entactogens
- MYCO-005
