= TN-001 =

Clinical data
- Other names: TN001
- Routes of administration: Unspecified
- Drug class: Serotonin receptor modulator; Non-hallucinogenic serotonin 5-HT_{2A} receptor agonist; Psychoplastogen

TN-001 is a non-hallucinogenic psychoplastogen which is under development for the treatment of major depressive disorder and post-traumatic stress disorder (PTSD). Its route of administration is unspecified. The drug acts as a serotonin receptor modulator, including as a serotonin 5-HT_{2A} receptor partial agonist and serotonin 5-HT_{2B} receptor antagonist, and has been found to produce psychoplastogenic effects without inducing the head-twitch response. It is being developed by Transneural Therapeutics, a spinout of CaaMTech. As of June 2025, TN-001 is in the preclinical research stage of development. A clinical trial is being planned. The chemical structure of the drug does not yet appear to have been disclosed.

== See also ==
- Non-hallucinogenic 5-HT_{2A} receptor agonist
- List of investigational hallucinogens and entactogens
- List of investigational antidepressants
- List of investigational post-traumatic stress disorder drugs
