= AB-300 =

Clinical data
- Other names: AB300; Ariadne Bio-300
- Drug class: Non-hallucinogenic serotonin 5-HT_{2A} and 5-HT_{2C} receptor agonist

AB-300, short for Ariadne Bio-300, is a non-hallucinogenic serotonin 5-HT_{2A} and 5-HT_{2C} receptor agonist which is under development for potential medical use to treat non-motor symptoms of Parkinson's disease such as apathy and motivational deficits as well as late-life depression.

It has been found to reverse motivational deficits induced by the dopamine depleting agent tetrabenazine and hence to produce pro-motivational effects in rodents. These effects were more pronounced in rodents with the lowest baseline motivation and were comparable to those of the norepinephrine–dopamine reuptake inhibitor (NDRI) bupropion. Bupropion has psychostimulant-like effects in rodents, but not at typical clinical doses in humans.

AB-300 is under development by Ariadne Bio, a company of Negev Labs. Ariadne Bio is named after Ariadne (4C-D; BL-3912; Dimoxamine), a non-hallucinogenic serotonin 5-HT_{2A} receptor agonist which was developed by Alexander Shulgin and Bristol Laboratories, produced indirect dopaminergic and pro-motivational effects in animals analogously to AB-300, and reached phase 3 clinical trials for various medical uses in the 1970s, but was ultimately never marketed due to cited strategic economic reasons. A phase 1b trial of AB-300 is initiating in the third quarter of 2026. The exact chemical structure of AB-300 does not yet appear to have been disclosed, but it is said to have been patented.

== See also ==
- Non-hallucinogenic 5-HT_{2A} receptor agonist
- List of investigational hallucinogens and entactogens
- List of investigational Parkinson's disease drugs
- Stimulant § Serotonin 5-HT_{2A} receptor agonists
- Motivation-enhancing drug § Serotonin 5-HT_{2A} receptor agonists
- Ariadne (4C-D; BL-3912; Dimoxamine)
- ASR-2001 (2CB-5PrO)
- Thiobuscaline
