= LPH-48 =

Serotonergic psychedelic

Clinical data
- Other names: LPH48
- Routes of administration: Unspecified
- Drug class: Selective serotonin 5-HT_{2A} receptor agonist; Serotonergic psychedelic; Hallucinogen

LPH-48 is a selective serotonin 5-HT_{2A} receptor agonist and psychedelic hallucinogen which is under development for the treatment of alcoholism. Its route of administration has not been specified.

The drug acts as a selective agonist of the serotonin 5-HT_{2A} receptor. It is said to be an analogue of LPH-5 with similar characteristics but with faster metabolism and a shorter duration of action. LPH-5 is a highly selective serotonin 5-HT_{2A} receptor agonist that is under development for major depressive disorder and has shown antidepressant-like effects in animals.

LPH-48 is under development by Lophora. As of May 2024, it is in preclinical research for alcoholism. The chemical structure of LPH-48 does not yet seem to have been disclosed. However, Lophora has patented selective serotonin 5-HT_{2A} receptor agonists for treatment of depression and the company is said to have patent protection for LPH-48. Additionally, the structure of its close analogue LPH-5 is known and this compound is a phenylpiperidine derivative.

== See also ==
- Cyclized phenethylamine
- Substituted 3-phenylpiperidine
- List of investigational hallucinogens and entactogens
- BMB-202
