= MYCO-005 =

Psychedelic drug

Clinical data
- Other names: MYCO005
- Drug class: Serotonin 5-HT_{2A} receptor agonist; Serotonergic psychedelic; Hallucinogen

MYCO-005 is a serotonin 5-HT_{2A} receptor agonist and psychedelic hallucinogen which is under development for the treatment of depressive disorders and anxiety disorders.

It is an aza-indole analogue of psilocin and hence a tryptamine relative. However, whereas psilocin and other tryptamines show high affinity for and potent activation of not only the serotonin 5-HT_{2A} receptor but also the serotonin 5-HT_{2B} receptor, MYCO-005 does not bind to this receptor. Activation of the serotonin 5-HT_{2B} receptor is known to induce the development of cardiac valvulopathy and has been a concern with regard to chronic microdosing of psychedelics. Since MYCO-005 does not activate the serotonin 5-HT_{2B} receptor, it is anticipated to be heart-safe and to be safer for use in the contexts of both macro- and microdosing than other psychedelics.

As of February 2024, MYCO-005 is in the research stage of development for depressive disorders and anxiety disorders. It is being developed by Mydecine. The exact chemical structure of MYCO-005 does not yet seem to have been disclosed. However, the compound was patented in 2023 and the specified patent specifically describes aza-substituted psilocin analogues.

== See also ==
- MYCO-004
- List of investigational hallucinogens and entactogens
