= AtaiBeckley =

American pharmaceutical company, subsidiary of Eli Lilly

AtaiBeckley Inc.
- Type: Subsidiary
- Traded as: Nasdaq: ATAI (2021–2026)
- Industry: Biotechnology
- Predecessor: atai Life Sciences; Beckley Psytech
- Founded: 2018 (as atai Life Sciences); 2019 (as Beckley Psytech); 2025 (as AtaiBeckley)
- Founders: Christian Angermayer; Florian Brand (founding CEO, atai Life Sciences); Amanda Feilding; Cosmo Feilding Mellen (founding CEO, Beckley Psytech); Srinivas Rao; Lars Wilde
- Fate: Acquired by Eli Lilly and Company (2026)
- Headquarters: New York City, United States
- Parent: Eli Lilly and Company
- Website: www.ataibeckley.com

AtaiBeckley Inc. is a clinical-stage biotechnology company developing treatments for mental health disorders, including therapies based on psychedelics, entactogens, and related compounds. It was formed in November 2025 through the combination of atai Life Sciences N.V. and Beckley Psytech Limited, and has been a wholly owned subsidiary of Eli Lilly and Company since September 2026.

== History ==
atai Life Sciences was founded in Berlin, Germany, in 2018 by Christian Angermayer, Florian Brand, Srinivas Rao and Lars Christian Wilde, with Brand as founding chief executive officer. Originally a German Aktiengesellschaft, the company converted into a Dutch naamloze vennootschap ahead of its initial public offering in June 2021, in which it raised $225 million on the Nasdaq. Beckley Psytech, a private company, was founded in Oxford in 2019 by Amanda Feilding and Cosmo Feilding Mellen, with Feilding Mellen as founding chief executive officer.

Peter Thiel was a major investor in atai Life Sciences. atai Life Sciences also held a 22.4% stake in Compass Pathways.

In January 2024, atai Life Sciences made a $50 million strategic investment in Beckley Psytech, taking a 35.5% stake and securing a time-limited right of first refusal on any sale of the company and a right of first negotiation over its lead candidates BPL-003 and ELE-101. In June 2025, atai Life Sciences announced that it would combine with Beckley Psytech; the merger completed in November 2025 and the combined company was renamed AtaiBeckley, with Rao as chief executive officer. In December 2025, the combined company redomiciled from the Netherlands to the United States, incorporating in Delaware with headquarters in New York. After the merger the company's shares continued to trade on the Nasdaq under the ticker symbol ATAI.

In July 2025, the companies reported positive topline results from a Phase 2b study of BPL-003 in 193 patients with treatment-resistant depression: a single 12 mg dose reduced scores on the Montgomery-Åsberg Depression Rating Scale (MADRS) by a mean of 11.1 points at day 29, compared with 5.8 points for a low-dose comparator, with effects seen from day one and maintained through week eight. In October 2025, the U.S. Food and Drug Administration (FDA) granted BPL-003 Breakthrough Therapy Designation for treatment-resistant depression.

In July 2026, Eli Lilly and Company announced that it would acquire AtaiBeckley for $6.75 per share in cash, an aggregate equity value of approximately $2.8 billion, plus a contingent value right (CVR) of up to $2.50 per share, worth approximately $1.0 billion in aggregate, payable on the initiation of a Phase 3 trial of VLS-01 and on U.S. regulatory approval and Drug Enforcement Administration (DEA) rescheduling of BPL-003 and VLS-01, for a total potential value of up to US$3.8 billion. At the time of the announcement, BPL-003 had initiated Phase 3 activities. The transaction closed on 11 September 2026, and AtaiBeckley became a wholly owned subsidiary of Lilly. At closing, the company's directors and executive officers, including Rao and Angermayer, resigned and were replaced by Lilly appointees, and its shares were delisted from the Nasdaq.

== Leadership ==
=== Chief executive officers ===
Name	Company	Tenure
Florian Brand	atai Life Sciences	2018–2025
Cosmo Feilding Mellen	Beckley Psytech	2019–2025
Srinivas Rao	AtaiBeckley	2025–2026

== Pipeline ==
The company's pharmaceutical candidates include mebufotenin (5-MeO-DMT; BPL-003; intranasal) for treatment-resistant depression, dimethyltryptamine (DMT; VLS-01; oromucosal film) for treatment-resistant depression, and (R)-midomafetamine ((R)-MDMA; EMP-01) for social anxiety disorder. The company is also advancing a drug discovery program to identify novel, non-hallucinogenic 5-HT2A receptor (5-HT2AR) agonists for opioid use disorder and treatment-resistant depression.

VLS-01 is an oral transmucosal film formulation of DMT designed for a two-hour treatment session. Elumina, a 156-patient, placebo-controlled Phase 2b trial in treatment-resistant depression with two doses two weeks apart and a primary endpoint of MADRS change at day 29, completed dosing in July 2026, with topline data expected in the fourth quarter of 2026. Initiation of a Phase 3 trial of VLS-01 is one of the milestones under the contingent value right in the Lilly acquisition.

Earlier candidates of atai Life Sciences prior to the merger included ibogaine (IBX-210, DMX-1002), EGX-121 (a non-tryptamine new chemical entity), psilocin (ELE-101), inidascamine (RL-007), deuterated mitragynine (KUR-101), EGX-A, EGX-B, deuterated etifoxine (GRX-917), and arketamine (PCN-101).

== See also ==
- List of psychedelic pharmaceutical companies
- List of investigational hallucinogens and entactogens
