= AKO-001 =

Combination of
- Dimethyltryptamine: Serotonergic psychedelic
- ? Component: Undisclosed specific plant bioactive

Clinical data
- Other names: AKO001; Dimethyltryptamine/specific plant bioactive; DMT/specific plant bioactive

AKO-001, or AKO001, is a combination of the non-selective serotonin receptor agonist and serotonergic psychedelic dimethyltryptamine (DMT) and an undisclosed "specific plant bioactive" which is under development for the treatment of stroke. While the "specific plant bioactive" in the combination and the action of this compound have not been disclosed, certain plant compounds, such as the β-carboline harmine in Banisteriopsis caapi, are reversible monoamine oxidase A (MAO-A) inhibitors and inhibit the metabolism of DMT, in turn greatly potentiating DMT and allowing it to become orally active. AKO-001 is being developed by Akome Biotech. As of March 2022, the drug is in the preclinical research stage of development.

== See also ==
- List of investigational hallucinogens and entactogens
