= PSIL-001 =

Clinical data
- Other names: PSIL001
- Routes of administration: Unspecified
- Drug class: Non-hallucinogenic serotonin 5-HT_{1} receptor modulator

PSIL-001 is a non-hallucinogenic serotonin 5-HT_{1} receptor modulator which is under development for the treatment of depressive disorders, mood disorders, neurodegenerative disorders, and substance-related disorders. Its route of administration is unspecified. The drug's effects in animals have been described. PSIL-001 is being developed by Psilera. As of August 2022, it is in the preclinical research stage of development for all indications. The drug is an analogue of dimethyltryptamine (DMT), but its exact chemical structure does not yet seem to have been disclosed.

== See also ==
- List of investigational hallucinogens and entactogens
- List of investigational antidepressants
