= Ketamine-assisted psychotherapy =

Therapeutic use of prescribed ketamine

Ketamine-assisted psychotherapy is the use of prescribed doses of ketamine, an analgesic anesthetic with dissociative properties, in combination with psychotherapy for treatment of various psychiatric conditions. Ketamine-assisted psychotherapy shows potential in treating mental disorders including major depressive disorder, anxiety, obsessive–compulsive disorder, post-traumatic stress disorders, substance use disorder, and neuropathic pain. Despite initial usage as a rapid-acting antidepressant, its hallucinogenic effects have sparked interest in its potential for treatment of mental illnesses beyond depressive symptoms. Ketamine appears to offer promising results as an effective modality of treatment for a variety of mental conditions and was approved by the Food and Drug Administration (FDA) in the United States for usage in treatment-resistant depression, but does display areas in need of further research across different domains of mental illness.

== Background ==
Ketamine is a short-acting, noncompetitive N-methyl-D-aspartate (NMDA) receptor antagonist that was discovered by Parke-Davis Labs and Dr. Calvin Lee Stevens in 1962 during research into derivatives of phencyclidine (PCP). It was first used clinically as a veterinary anesthetic that was first given to a human in 1964 as a potential replacement for PCP. Soon after, Parke-Davis filed a patent for the utilization of the anesthetic. With this patent, ketamine began to be used on the battlefield where it was considered the "buddy drug" because soldiers were able to administer it to one another. Given its hallucinogenic properties, interest rapidly rose in the possibility of broader avenues of application, including within the field of psychiatry as a treatment for depression, substance use dependence, and more. Thus, soon after discovery, ketamine has been used as an off-label medication for a diverse group of psychiatric symptoms across Europe and the United States, and a topic of robust investigation. The US Food and Drug Administration (FDA) first approved the use of intranasal esketamine (Spravato)—an enantiomer of ketamine—for the use of ketamine-derived therapy for treatment-resistant depression, in 2019, leading to the creation and expansion of telemedicine-based companies that practice ketamine-assisted psychotherapy, such as the Psychedelic Institute of Mental Health & Family Therapy. In addition to a nasal spray, ketamine lozenges called "troches" are being administered. Ketamine is currently one of three injected general anesthetics that the World Health Organisation includes in its Model List of Essential Medicines along with propofol and thiopental, and is listed as safe to use for children.

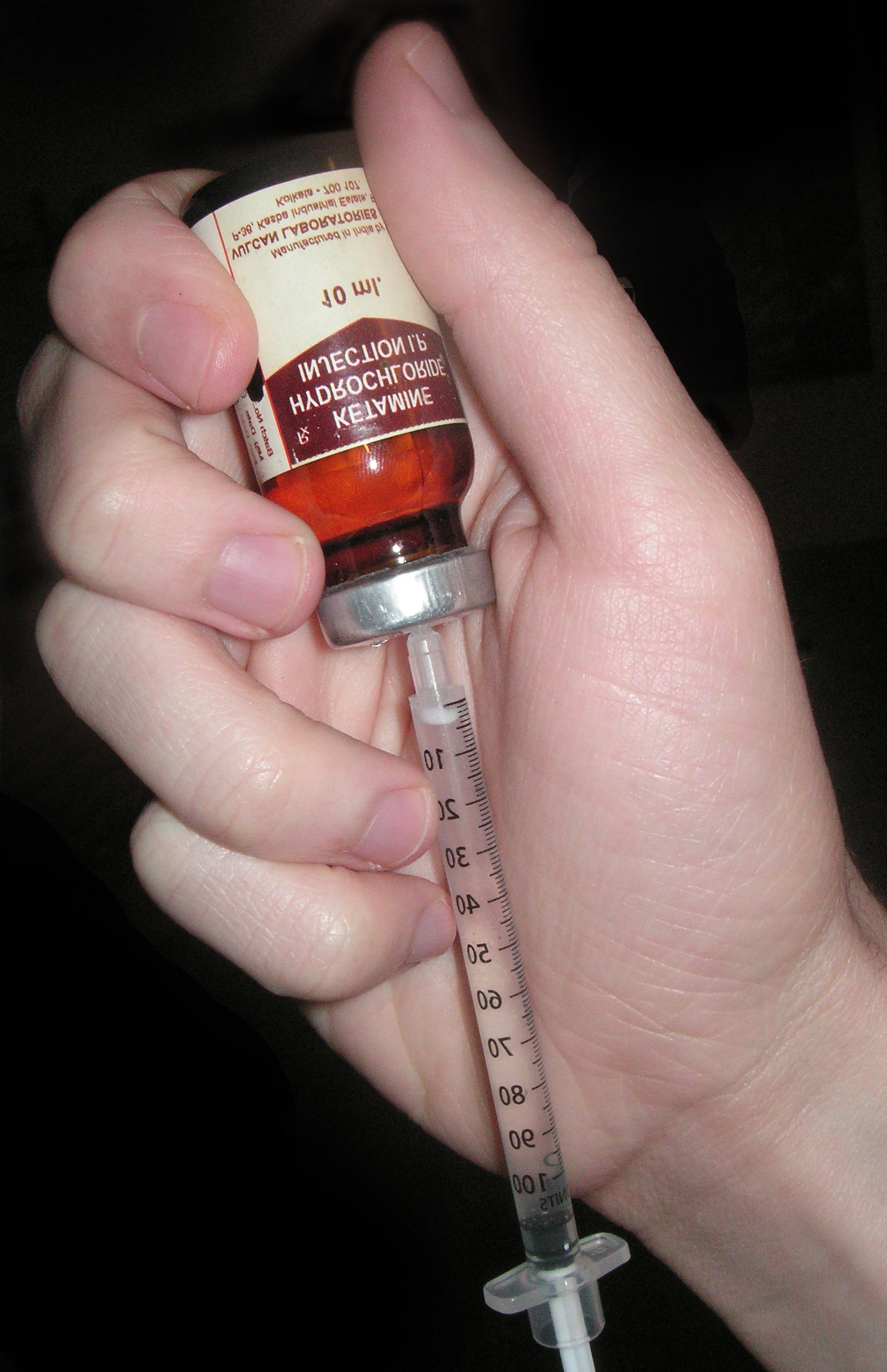
Example of a ketamine vial being used for injection. Ketamine was initially used as a veterinary anesthetic.

=== Rationale for interest ===
As of 2023, the World Health Organization reports that 230 million people worldwide have depression, or around 3.8% of the human population. The current therapy for depression includes, but is not limited to, psychotherapy, antidepressant medications, transcranial magnetic stimulation, electroconvulsive therapy, and lifestyle approaches. However, antidepressant treatment is heavily limited by its delayed onset of efficacy, with noticeable effects only appearing over a period of months. The Sequenced Treatment Alternatives to Relieve Depression Study (STAR*D) Trial also found that patients had low response rates to alternative compounds after the failure of the first antidepressant. Thus, interest sparked for a more rapid treatment option that could also be used as an adjunct to previous therapies in treatment-resistant depression. Ketamine's neuroplasticity-promoting effects appear to strengthen the cognitive restructuring that takes place through traditional psychotherapy, thereby leading to long-lasting behavioral change, making it a compound of recent interest.

Research evidence has found that combining psychotherapy and antidepressant medications enhances the effects of both. This combination of pharmacotherapy and psychotherapy has historically been efficacious in numerous instances, such as the pairing of psychotherapy with conventional antidepressants for mood and anxiety disorders, with naltrexone for alcohol and opioid dependence, and with bupropion for smoking cessation. Ketamine offers a notable advantage as opposed to currently-approved antidepressants, as it has a rapid onset (2–24 hours post-infusion) of temporally limited, but sustained, antidepressant and analgesic effects (typically lasting 4–7 days). Its dissociative, psychedelic effects could also provide patients with increased neuroplasticity and cognitive flexibility that would enable more effective participation in therapy sessions. Therapy could, in turn, reinforce the effects and improvements facilitated by ketamine to provide longer-lasting treatment. Supplementing ketamine use with cognitive behaviour therapy (CBT), in particular, has the potential to help patients reverse their inaccurate beliefs and maladaptive processing of information, that lead to depressive mental states.

== Active mechanisms ==
Ketamine as an NMDA receptor antagonist

There are several hypotheses as to the underlying neural and cognitive mechanisms responsible for the psychiatric effects of ketamine. Its mechanism of action is as an NMDA receptor antagonist. As such, glutamate modulation is a well-known effect, which is specifically believed to confer increased synaptic excitability. Notably, however, the effects of ketamine are now believed to be larger in scope than previously thought, ultimately leading to greater synaptogenesis and neuroplasticity. As demonstrated in animal models, the administration of ketamine propagates signaling pathways surmised to augment neuroplasticity. Key among these are mammalian target of rapamycin (mTOR), glycogen synthase kinase-3 (GSK3), and elongation factor 2 (eEF2) kinase. Ketamine has also demonstrated its ability to increase brain-derived neurotrophic factor levels within the brain in animal studies, which ameliorates the effects of acute and chronic stress. The subsequent increase in both synaptic excitation and neuroplasticity is believed to precipitate the powerful and immediate symptom reduction ketamine elicits for a variety of conditions. It has additionally been theorized that ketamine disrupts the reconsolidation of dysfunctional memories and, through doing so, diminishes the burden of those associated with trauma, anxiety, substance use, and so on.

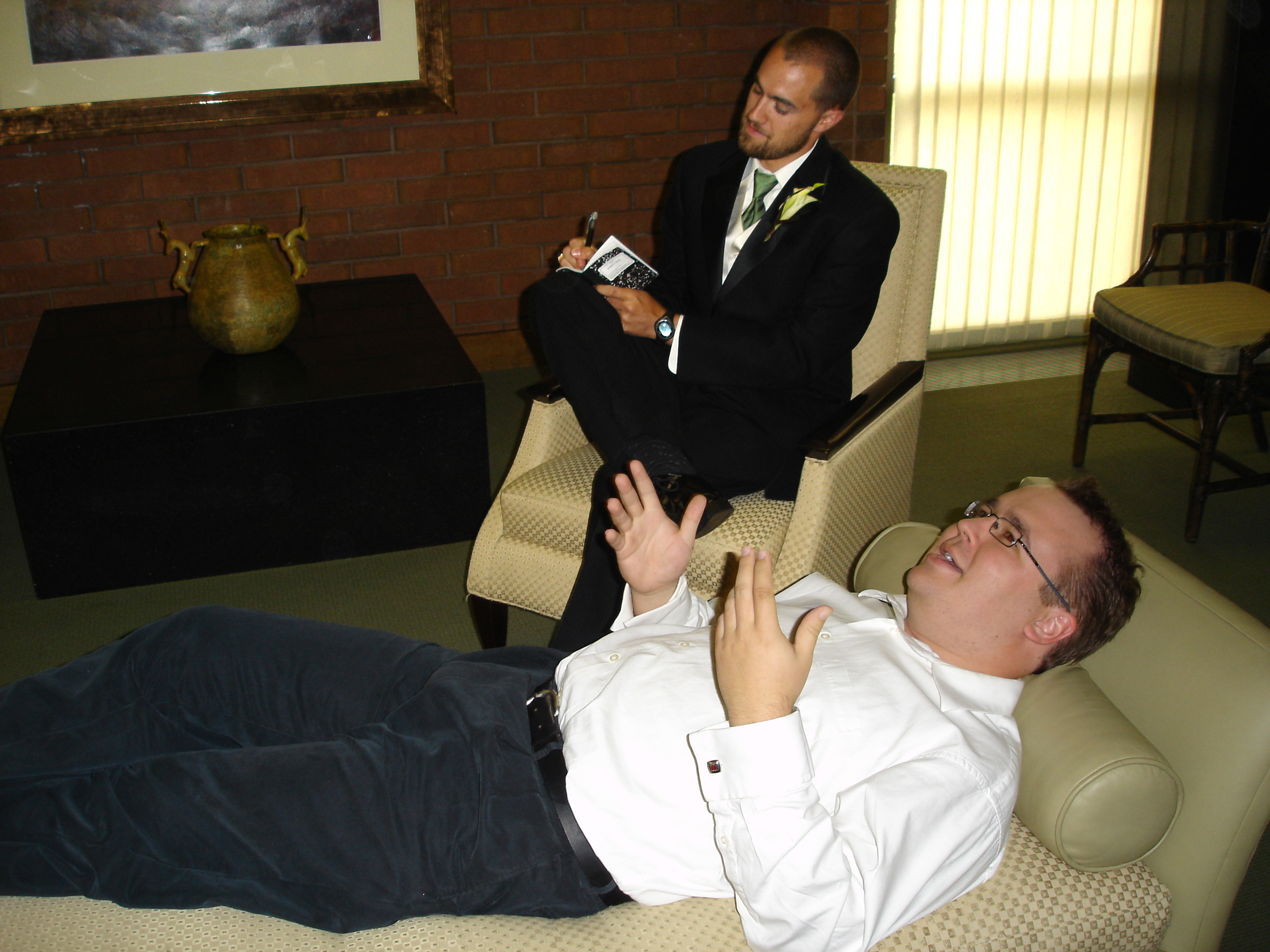
An individual speaking with a psychotherapist.

== Clinical uses ==
=== Treatment-resistant depression ===
The use of ketamine as an antidepressant has mainly been studied for the treatment of treatment-resistant depression (TRD). Single-dose use has been found to have noticeable and rapid anti-depressive effects that tend to last up to a week, accompanied by acute side-effects that resolve spontaneously. It has also been shown to have a moderate-to-large effect in reducing suicidality in some patients suffering from suicidal ideation, with visible efficacy within two hours of administration. This is in sharp contrast with currently-approved treatment options, whose delayed onset poses an increased risk for suicidality in patients. However, this potency cannot currently be generalised for non-depressed patients experiencing suicidal ideation.

==== Protocol and administration ====
Repeated sessions of ketamine-assisted psychotherapy have also been found to be an effective method for facilitating clinically-significant reduction in anxiety and depression, when conducted in private practice settings. Sessions may last up to three hours, with provisions for supervised recovery towards the end. The time-to-relapse after ketamine treatment is typically 2–4 weeks, which is why a repeated dosage paradigm is used to increase its efficacy on treatment-resistant depression. Currently only 20% of the 2,500 ketamine clinics in the United States offer ketamine-assisted psychotherapy.

The mode of ketamine administration is a crucial consideration in the use of ketamine-assisted psychotherapy for depression. It employs a dosage escalation strategy to achieve different levels of dissociative effects, depending on the amount of alteration of consciousness needed for treatment. Lower-dose sublingual administration is recommended for sessions that require active therapist-patient communication, and higher-dose intramuscular administration takes place when an inward focus is needed, with eye coverings and music provided. There is no notable difference in efficacy, however. Guidelines for the provision of psychotherapy are also variably defined, depending on the application, with it being delivered either simultaneously, or following the infusion of ketamine.

=== Bipolar disorder ===
Multiple studies have identified the beneficial effect of combining a mood-stabilizing agent with intravenous ketamine infusions for controlling the depressive phase of bipolar disorder. Notably, depressive symptoms including suicidal ideations were improved rapidly within around 40 minutes, which is difficult with current antidepressant therapy. However, a few patients did experience dissociative and/or manic symptoms during therapy in multiple studies, and the long-term effects of ketamine therapy and alternative modes of ketamine administration (other than intravenous) remain unclear, indicating the need for further research into the area before efficacy and safety can be determined. Furthermore, research remains mixed on whether or not ketamine infusions are more effective than esketamine.

=== Anxiety disorder ===
Studies on the effect of ketamine on anxiety disorders remain sparse in number. However, limited studies have shown significantly improved symptoms of anxiety with ketamine, with various modalities of administration including intravenous, intramuscular, and oral. In these studies, ketamine appeared to be an effective method to lower anxiety rapidly, but its long-term effects and combinations with other modes of therapy remain unclear.

=== Obsessive-compulsive disorder ===
Ketamine appears to significantly improve symptoms of obsessive-compulsive disorders short-term, with improved effects when used in conjunction with cognitive behavioral therapy. Of note, mild to moderate symptoms of obsessive thoughts and compulsions were treated with significant efficacy, even in patients with psychiatric comorbidities.

=== Substance use disorder ===
Ketamine has been shown to significantly affect treatment rates and reduce cravings in multiple modalities of substance use disorder, including that of alcohol, cocaine, and opioids. Ketamine therapy used in conjunction with psychotherapy also appeared to decrease cannabis use. However, the mechanisms of action for these effects remain unknown, and the addictive effects of ketamine on patients prone to substance use disorder has not been studied.

=== Eating disorders ===
Eating disorders have been a challenge to treat due to varying degrees of effectiveness of current treatments and high rates of remission, and treatment often features a combination of psychotherapy with various psychotropic medications. Ketamine has been shown to be an effective treatment for eating disorders, particularly for anorexia nervosa. While ketamine's effects on eating disorders appear positive, especially in patients who have failed previous therapies, the limited number of clinical studies available suggests that more research is needed to demonstrate its efficacy and safety across the diverse modalities of eating disorders.

=== Side effects ===
The most common side effects of both intravenous ketamine and intranasal esketamine include, but are not limited to: dissociation, disorientation, dizziness, nausea, and hypertension. However, recent research has demonstrated a sublingual type of ketamine therapy that is both efficacious, able to be used from home, and low-risk. Further research is needed to assess the long-term side effects of ketamine therapy in multiple modalities.

=== Legality ===
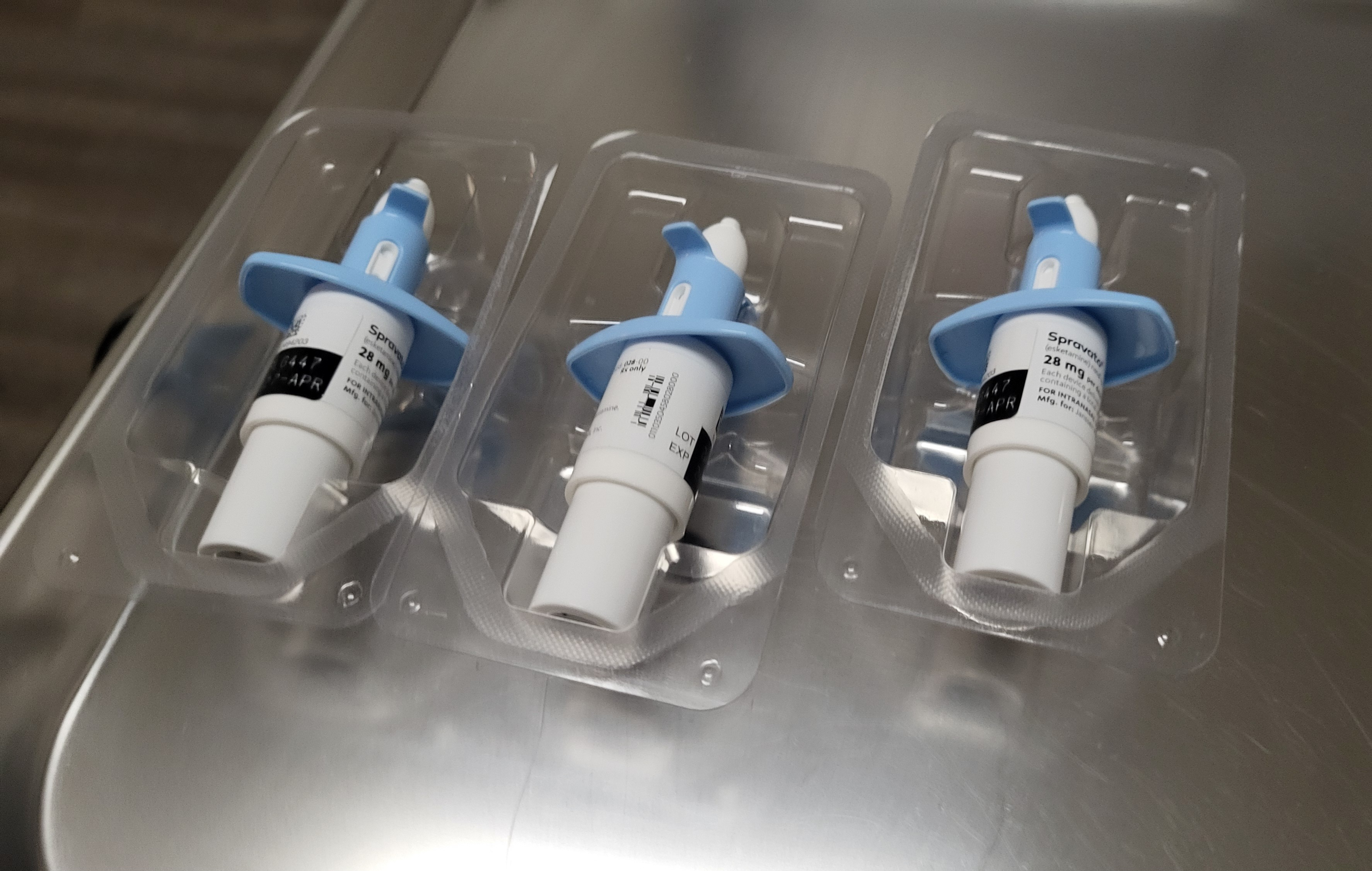
Spravato nasal spray

In the United States, ketamine is approved by the FDA as an anesthetic agent. However, use of compounded ketamine for any psychiatric disorder is not approved by the FDA due to concerns for safety and efficacy, despite off-label prescriptions by healthcare professionals. Since 2019, only esketamine (Spravato) has been approved by the FDA since 2019 as a nasal spray for depression that is treatment-resistant or to control acute behaviors of suicidality. Esketamine is under strict regulation and guidance from FDA and the Risk Evaluation and Mitigation Strategy (REMS), requiring patient monitoring after administration for safety. Despite FDA's lack of approval, ketamine has been prescribed off-label by healthcare professionals to patients with a variety of psychiatric conditions, particularly in settings of treatment-resistant conditions. In the United States, ketamine is able to be given off-label by healthcare professionals only, and over 2000 clinics have legally been prescribing ketamine under medical supervision for psychiatric care. Other countries also allow the use of ketamine as an off-label agent to treat resistant psychiatric conditions under medical supervision, including Canada, Germany, and United Kingdom. Potential risks associated with it include dissociation, sedation and abuse. Esketamine cannot be distributed outside of certified clinical settings.

== Limitations and future directions ==
Ketamine-assisted psychotherapy has the potential to show significant efficacy in the treatment of treatment-resistant depression and suicidality, among other mental disorders. However, extensive further research is needed for its effects and mechanisms of action to be properly understood. Currently, the lack of large, replicated clinical trials prevent existing results from being generalizable to the larger population, and many clinical trials have used different administrations of treatment, making a standardized review difficult. The current model of ketamine-assisted psychotherapy also uses repeated administration of ketamine, the long-term side effects of which are not fully known yet. High doses of ketamine could also have potentially toxic effects in patients. Given that existing studies only have short-term follow-up, the long-term safety of patients who undergo repeated dosing is, therefore, unknown. Future trials should be of larger scale, with repeated ketamine dosing, regular monitoring and follow-up. They should also focus on integrating ketamine with other forms of therapy, including, but not limited to motivational enhancement therapy (MET) and functional analytic psychotherapy (FAP).

== See also ==
- List of investigational hallucinogens and entactogens
