= C11H13NO =

The molecular formula C_{11}H_{13}NO (molar mass: 175.22 g/mol, exact mass: 175.099714 u) may refer to:

- 2-APB (entactogen)
- 3-APB
- 4-APB
- 5-APB
- 6-APB (6-(2-aminopropyl)benzofuran)
- 7-APB
- p-Dimethylaminocinnamaldehyde (DMACA)
