= 4-APB =

Clinical data
- Other names: 4-(2-Aminopropyl)benzofuran; 4-APB
- Drug class: Serotonin–norepinephrine–dopamine releasing agent

Identifiers
- IUPAC name: 1-(1-benzofuran-4-yl)propan-2-amine
- CAS Number: 286834-83-1
- PubChem CID: 10130546
- ChemSpider: 8306061
- UNII: BXL47QK09N
- CompTox Dashboard (EPA): DTXSID901043369

Chemical and physical data
- Formula: C_{11}H_{13}NO
- Molar mass: 175.231 g·mol^{−1}
- 3D model (JSmol): Interactive image
- SMILES: CC(CC1=C2C=COC2=CC=C1)N
- InChI: InChI=1S/C11H13NO/c1-8(12)7-9-3-2-4-11-10(9)5-6-13-11/h2-6,8H,7,12H2,1H3; Key:XROLBZOMVNMIFN-UHFFFAOYSA-N

4-(2-Aminopropyl)benzofuran (4-APB) is a monoamine releasing agent and novel designer drug of the benzofuran family. It acts as a serotonin–norepinephrine–dopamine releasing agent (SNDRA). The drug was first detected, in Europe, by 2011.

== See also ==
- 2-APB
- 3-APB
- 5-APB
- 6-APB
- 7-APB
- Substituted benzofuran
