= C13H17NO =

The molecular formula C_{13}H_{17}NO (molar mass : 203.28 g/mol, exact mass : 203.131014) may refer to:

- Crotamiton
- Deschloroketamine
- 5-EAPB
- 6-EAPB
- 5-MBPB
- 6-MBPB
- 2-MABB
- N-Phenethyl-4-piperidinone
- α-Pyrrolidinopropiophenone
