= Tactogen =

American pharmaceutical company

- Type: Public benefit corporation
- Industry: Pharmaceutical; Psychedelic medicine
- Founded: 2020; 6 years ago in Palo Alto, United States
- Founder: Matthew J. Baggott; Luke Pustejovsky
- Headquarters: Palo Alto, California, United States
- Website: tactogen.com

Tactogen is a public benefit corporation and start-up pharmaceutical company based in Palo Alto, California that is developing novel MDMA-like entactogens and psychedelics as medicines. Its stated goal is to develop new MDMA-like drugs with improved effectiveness, tolerability, and safety, as well as gentleness and accessibility, for treatment of psychiatric disorders and other conditions. Tactogen was co-founded by neuroscientist Matthew J. Baggott and Luke Pustejovsky in 2020. Baggott is the chief executive officer (CEO) while Pustejovsky is the chief operating officer (COO).

== Drug candidates ==
Tactogen has patented various novel entactogen-like compounds from different chemical families. These include benzofurans like 5-MAPB, 6-MAPB, 5-MBPB, 6-MBPB, BK-5-MAPB, and BK-6-MAPB, benzothiophenes like 5-MAPBT, 6-MAPBT, and BK-5-MAPBT, α-alkyl- and β-ketotryptamines like BK-NM-AMT and BK-5F-NM-AMT, indolizines like 2ZEDMA, 1ZP2MA, and Z2MAP1O, 2-aminoindanes like "BFAI", and non-racemic mixtures of enantiomers, for instance varying-proportion combinations of (S)-5-MAPB and (R)-5-MAPB. The company has several drugs in its official developmental pipeline, including TACT411, TACT833, TACT908, and TACT523. Tactogen is said to have been the first to develop novel entactogens. It says that it has synthesized hundreds of different molecules and claims that it has developed the largest known library of entactogenic compounds.

Tactogen unexpectedly found that benzofurans, including 5-MAPB, 6-MAPB, BK-5-MAPB, and BK-6-MAPB, and benzothiophenes, including 5-MAPBT, 6-MAPBT, and BK-5-MAPBT, act as potent serotonin 5-HT_{1B} receptor agonists in addition to their actions as monoamine releasing agents. This property is in contrast to MDMA, which has much lower potency as a serotonin 5-HT_{1B} receptor agonist. The serotonin 5-HT_{1B} receptor agonism of the preceding agents might be involved in or contribute to their entactogenic effects.

At least some of Tactogen's drug candidates are said to be benzofurans, for instance 5-MAPB. In preliminary research, they have found that 5-MAPB appears to reduce social anxiety and promote self-compassion similarly to MDMA, but does not seem to promote energy and positive emotions as much as MDMA, and hence may retain therapeutic efficacy with less misuse potential. Phase 1 and 2 clinical trials of Tactogen's drug candidates in healthy volunteers and people with post-traumatic stress disorder (PTSD) are said to be in the planning stages as of February 2024. Some of its candidates have been said to lack the serotonergic neurotoxicity of MDMA in animals.

Tactogen is additionally studying a combination of MDMA and citalopram wherein MDMA is followed by the selective serotonin reuptake inhibitor (SSRI) citalopram in efforts to reduce the serotonergic neurotoxicity and negative after-effects of MDMA. A phase 2 trial of this strategy is planned to commence in 2025. Following the Food and Drug Administration (FDA)'s rejection of Lykos Therapeutics's MDMA for post-traumatic stress disorder (PTSD), Tactogen said in late 2024 that it is considering prioritizing its novel compounds over its MDMA/citalopram product.

In January 2023, it was reported that Tactogen had raised $6.3 million since early 2020.

== Selected publications ==
=== Presentations ===
- Matthew Baggott (18 June 2023). "Better Than Ecstasy: Progress in Developing a Novel Class of Therapeutic with Matthew Baggott, PhD". YouTube. Tactogen.
- Baggott M (23 June 2023). Beyond Ecstasy: Progress in Developing and Understanding a Novel Class of Therapeutic Medicine. PS2023 [Psychedelic Science 2023, June 19–23, 2023, Denver, Colorado]. Denver, CO: Multidisciplinary Association for Psychedelic Studies. Archived from the original on 17 June 2025. Alt URL
- Baggott, Matthew (September 2023). New Entactogens: Motivations and Progress. Psychedelic Molecules, 4th–5th September 2023, Prague, Czech Republic. Zenodo. doi:10.5281/ZENODO.10475573.

=== Studies ===
- Johnson C, Burroughs R, Walther D, Baggott M, Baumann M, Baker L (June 2023). Behavioral Assessments and Neurochemical Assays Differentiate the Effects of 1-(1-Benzofuran-5-yl)-2-(methylamino) propan-1-one Hydrochloride (BK-5-MAPB) Enantiomers (PDF). June 17–21, 2023: 85th CPDD Scientific Meeting, Denver, CO.
- Johnson CB, Walther D, Baggott MJ, Baker LE, Baumann MH (September 2024). "Novel Benzofuran Derivatives Induce Monoamine Release and Substitute for the Discriminative Stimulus Effects of 3,4-Methylenedioxymethamphetamine". J Pharmacol Exp Ther. 391 (1): 22–29. doi:10.1124/jpet.123.001837. PMC 11413916. PMID 38272669.
- Baggott, Matthew; Walther, Donna; Luethi, Dino; Coyle, Jeremy; Liechti, Matthias; Baumann, Michael (July 2024). "S168 - Estimating Human Doses of Stimulant-Like New Psychoactive Substances Based on Invitro Monoamine Transporter Data". Drug and Alcohol Dependence. 260 (Suppl): 110279. doi:10.1016/j.drugalcdep.2023.110278.

== See also ==
- List of psychedelic pharmaceutical companies
- List of investigational hallucinogens and entactogens
- Borax combo
