= 5-MBPB =

Chemical compound

Clinical data
- ATC code: none

Legal status
- Legal status: CA: Schedule I; DE: NpSG (Industrial and scientific use only); UK: Class B

Identifiers
- IUPAC name: 1-(1-benzofuran-5-yl)-N-methylbutan-2-amine
- CAS Number: 2855966-57-1
- PubChem CID: 139033209
- ChemSpider: 52085237
- UNII: YHB7YWS4WJ
- CompTox Dashboard (EPA): DTXSID601336210

Chemical and physical data
- Formula: C_{13}H_{17}NO
- Molar mass: 203.28 g/mol (freebase) 239.78 g/mol (hydrochloride) g·mol^{−1}
- 3D model (JSmol): Interactive image
- SMILES: CCC(CC1=CC2=C(OC=C2)C=C1)NC
- InChI: InChI=1S/C13H17NO/c1-3-12(14-2)9-10-4-5-13-11(8-10)6-7-15-13/h4-8,12,14H,3,9H2,1-2H3; Key:CTEZPBCLIKEASW-UHFFFAOYSA-N

5-MBPB (also known as 5-MPBP and 5-MABB) is an amphetamine and phenylisobutylamine derivative which is structurally related to MDMA and has been sold as a designer drug. It can be described as the benzofuran-5-yl analogue of MBDB or the butanamine homologue of 5-MAPB, and is also a structural isomer of 5-EAPB and 6-EAPB. Anecdotal reports suggest this compound has been sold as a designer drug in various European countries since early 2015, but the first definitive identification was made in December 2015 by a forensic laboratory in Slovenia.

5-MBPB is similar in structure to compounds such as 5-APB which are claimed to be agonists of the 5-HT_{2C} receptor.

5-MBPB (5-MABB) has been found to act as a potent serotonin–norepinephrine–dopamine releasing agent (SNDRA), with preference for induction of serotonin release over norepinephrine and dopamine release, and fully substitutes for MDMA in animal drug discrimination tests. Unlike 5-MAPB, it is a relatively weak serotonin 5-HT_{1B} receptor agonist.

== See also ==
- Substituted benzofuran
- 6-MBPB (6-MABB)
