= C12H13NO2 =

The molecular formula C_{12}H_{13}NO_{2} (molar mass: 203.24 g/mol, exact mass: 203.0946 u) may refer to:

- Indole-3-butyric acid (IBA)
- Mesuximide
- Norsecurinine
- βk-5-MAPB
- βk-6-MAPB
