= 5-MAPBT =

Chemical compound

Clinical data
- Other names: 5-(2-(Methylamino)propyl)-1-benzothiophene; MY400; MY-400
- Drug class: Monoamine releasing agent; Serotonin 5-HT_{1B} receptor agonist; Entactogen
- ATC code: None

Identifiers
- IUPAC name: 1-(1-benzothiophen-5-yl)-N-methylpropan-2-amine
- CAS Number: 2613382-32-2
- PubChem CID: 165889699
- ChemSpider: 103843875

Chemical and physical data
- Formula: C_{12}H_{15}NS
- Molar mass: 205.32 g·mol^{−1}
- 3D model (JSmol): Interactive image
- SMILES: CC(CC1=CC2=C(C=C1)SC=C2)NC
- InChI: InChI=1S/C12H15NS/c1-9(13-2)7-10-3-4-12-11(8-10)5-6-14-12/h3-6,8-9,13H,7H2,1-2H3; Key:SKSFWFUEBKJIAJ-UHFFFAOYSA-N

5-MAPBT, also known as 5-(2-(methylamino)propyl)-1-benzothiophene, is a possible entactogen of the phenethylamine, amphetamine, and benzothiophene families. It is closely related to 5-MAPB, but with the oxygen atom replaced by sulfur, changing the core ring structure to benzothiophene rather than benzofuran.

The drug acts as a potent monoamine releasing agent, including of serotonin and dopamine, and as a potent serotonin 5-HT_{1B} receptor agonist and serotonin 5-HT_{2B} receptor antagonist. It is also a monoamine oxidase A (MAO-A) inhibitor, with an IC_{50} of 765 nM.

It produces anxiolytic-like and antiobsessional-like effects in the marble burying test in rodents. However, benzothiophenes like 5-MAPBT, despite their induction of dopamine release, are said to lack hyperlocomotion or stimulant-like effects in rodents.

5-MAPBT has been studied and patented by Matthew J. Baggott at Tactogen. The drug has also been patented by Mydecine and given the developmental code name MY400.

== See also ==
- Substituted benzothiophene
- 6-MAPBT
- BK-5-MAPBT
- 5-MAPDI
- BK-5-MAPB
- IBF5MAP
- MDMA
- Methamnetamine
- TDMA
