= 2-MAPB =

Chemical compound

Identifiers
- IUPAC name: 1-(1-benzofuran-2-yl)-N-methylpropan-2-amine
- CAS Number: 806596-15-6
- PubChem CID: 547092
- ChemSpider: 476194
- UNII: W5G20WN7CL
- CompTox Dashboard (EPA): DTXSID901016908

Chemical and physical data
- Formula: C_{12}H_{15}NO
- Molar mass: 189.258 g·mol^{−1}
- 3D model (JSmol): Interactive image
- SMILES: CC(CC1=CC2=CC=CC=C2O1)NC
- InChI: InChI=1S/C12H15NO/c1-9(13-2)7-11-8-10-5-3-4-6-12(10)14-11/h3-6,8-9,13H,7H2,1-2H3; Key:ANJIDHKQUCZNQY-UHFFFAOYSA-N

2-MAPB is a recreational designer drug with empathogenic effects. As with other related substituted benzofuran derivatives such as 6-APB and 5-MAPB, 2-MAPB is a monoamine releaser with some selectivity for serotonin release, generally similar in pharmacological profile to MDMA but with greater activity as a directly acting agonist of 5-HT_{2} receptor subtypes and somewhat greater toxicity. 2-MAPB has been isolated from post-mortem toxicology screens in several drug-related fatal adverse reactions but generally only as a component of combinations of drugs, making it difficult to determine how much it contributed to the deaths. It is illegal in Japan.

== See also ==
- Substituted benzofuran
- Benzofuranylpropylaminopentane
- Dimemebfe
- 5-Methylmethiopropamine
- Methamnetamine
