= 5-MeO-DiBF =

Chemical compound

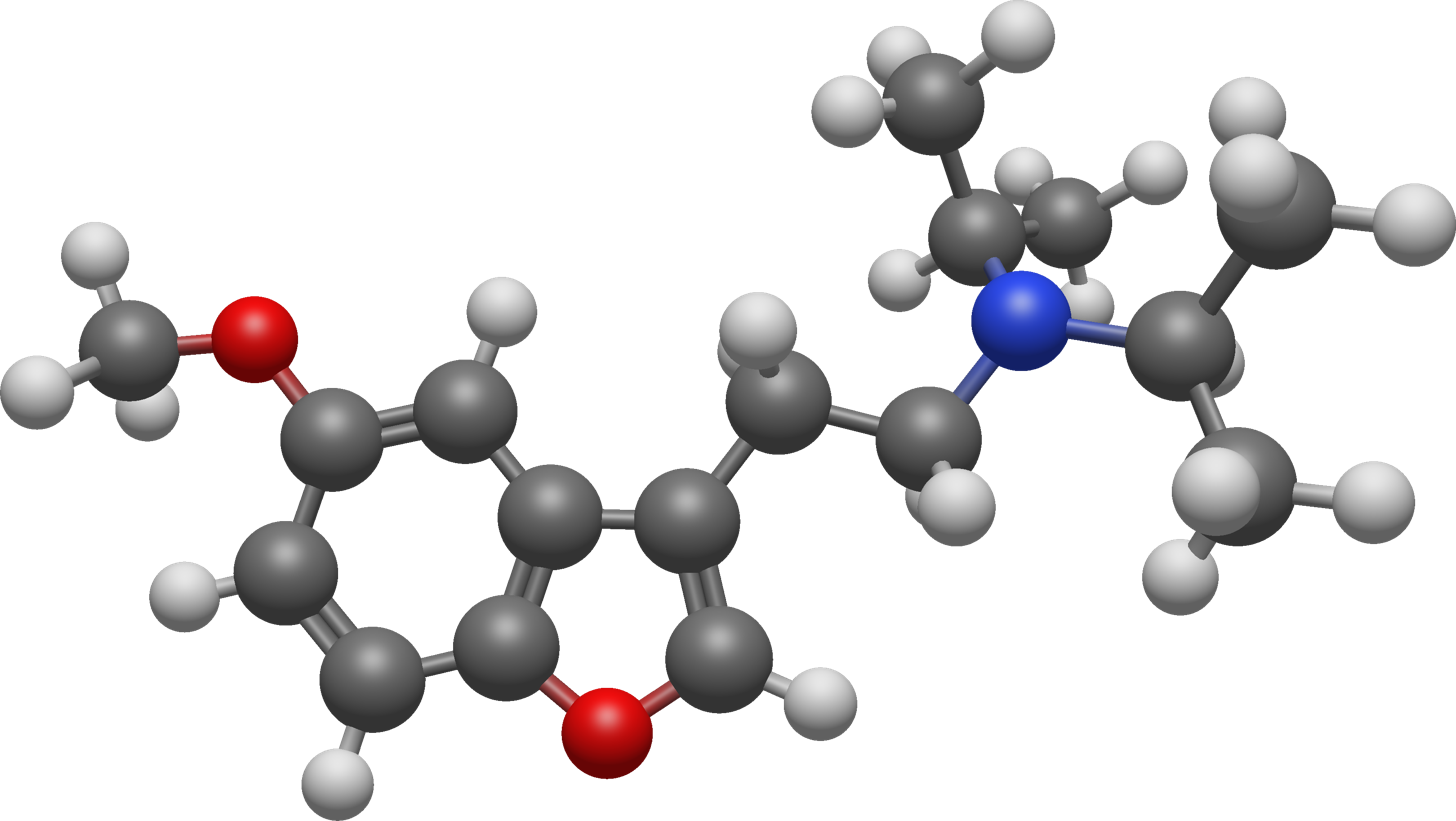

Clinical data
- Other names: 5-MeO-DIBF; 5-MeO-DiPBF; 5-Methoxy-N,N-diisopropyl-3-(2-aminoethyl)benzofuran; 5-Methoxy-N,N-diisopropyl-benzofuranethylamine; 1-Oxa-5-MeO-DiPT
- Routes of administration: Oral, insufflation
- Drug class: Serotonergic psychedelic; Hallucinogen
- ATC code: None

Legal status
- Legal status: DE: NpSG (Industrial and scientific use only); UK: Class A; US: ?

Pharmacokinetic data
- Onset of action: 45 minutes
- Duration of action: 4–9 hours

Identifiers
- IUPAC name: N-[2-(5-methoxy-1-benzofuran-3-yl)ethyl]-N-(propan-2-yl)propan-2-amine
- CAS Number: None
- PubChem CID: 125276632
- ChemSpider: 58191435
- UNII: 98H5PQ3THV
- CompTox Dashboard (EPA): DTXSID401032422

Chemical and physical data
- Formula: C_{17}H_{25}NO_{2}
- Molar mass: 275.392 g·mol^{−1}
- 3D model (JSmol): Interactive image
- SMILES: COC1=CC=C(OC=C2CCN(C(C)C)C(C)C)C2=C1
- InChI: InChI=1S/C17H25NO2/c1-12(2)18(13(3)4)9-8-14-11-20-17-7-6-15(19-5)10-16(14)17/h6-7,10-13H,8-9H2,1-5H3; Key:NBFMSQBTYHYVKP-UHFFFAOYSA-N

5-MeO-DiBF, also known as 5-methoxy-N,N-diisopropyl-3-(2-aminoethyl)benzofuran or as 1-oxa-5-MeO-DiPT, is a psychedelic drug of the benzofuran family related to the psychedelic tryptamine 5-MeO-DiPT. It is the analogue and bioisostere of 5-MeO-DiPT in which the indole nitrogen has been replaced with an oxygen atom, making it a benzofuran rather than tryptamine. The drug has been sold online as a novel designer drug starting in 2015.

== Use and effects ==
The dose of 5-MeO-DiBF has been given as 10 to 40 mg orally, with a light dose being 10 mg, a common dose being 20 mg, and a strong dose being 40 mg. Its onset is said to be 45 minutes and its duration is variably said to be 4 to 9 hours. In addition to oral administration, the drug may also be insufflated. The effects of 5-MeO-DiBF have been reported to include psychedelic head space, tactile sensations and tingling, and increased sexual desire, among others.

== Pharmacology ==
=== Pharmacodynamics ===
Analogues of 5-MeO-DiBF have been found to interact with serotonin receptors including the serotonin 5-HT_{1A} and 5-HT_{2} receptors.

== Chemistry ==
=== Analogues ===
Analogues of 5-MeO-DiBF include the benzofurans dimemebfe (5-MeO-BFE), MiPBF (1-oxa-MiPT), 3-APB (1-oxa-AMT), and mebfap (5-MeO-3-APB; 1-oxa-5-MeO-AMT) and the tryptamine 5-MeO-DiPT, among others.

== History ==
5-MeO-DiBF has been sold online as a designer drug and was first definitively identified in December 2015 by a forensic laboratory in Slovenia.

== Society and culture ==
=== Legal status ===
==== International ====
5-MeO-DiBF is not controlled under the United Nations 1971 Convention on Psychotropic Substances, so thus it has a legal grey area in many countries, but it's possible it could be illegal under so-called analogue acts if sold for human consumption.

==== Armenia ====
The drug is a controlled substance in Armenia as of 2022.

==== Canada ====
5-MeO-DiBF is not a controlled substance in Canada as of 2025.

==== United States ====
5-MeO-DiBF is not an explicitly controlled substance in the United States. However, it could be considered a controlled substance under the Federal Analogue Act if intended for human consumption.

== See also ==
- Substituted benzofuran
- Substituted tryptamine § Related compounds
