= 6-MBPB =

Clinical data
- Other names: 6-MABB; 6-(2-Methylaminobutyl)benzofuran
- Drug class: Serotonin–norepinephrine–dopamine releasing agent; Entactogen

Identifiers
- IUPAC name: 1-(1-benzofuran-6-yl)-N-methylbutan-2-amine
- PubChem CID: 163757284
- ChemSpider: 129902468
- ChEMBL: ChEMBL5404902

Chemical and physical data
- Formula: C_{13}H_{17}NO
- Molar mass: 203.285 g·mol^{−1}
- 3D model (JSmol): Interactive image
- SMILES: CCC(CC1=CC2=C(C=C1)C=CO2)NC
- InChI: InChI=1S/C13H17NO/c1-3-12(14-2)8-10-4-5-11-6-7-15-13(11)9-10/h4-7,9,12,14H,3,8H2,1-2H3; Key:LVDZDORQOMAGGH-UHFFFAOYSA-N

6-MBPB, also known as 6-(2-methylaminobutyl)benzofuran (6-MABB), is a monoamine releasing agent (MRA) and entactogen-like drug of the amphetamine, phenylisobutylamine, and benzofuran families. It is a positional isomer of 5-MBPB (5-MABB).

The drug appears to act as a serotonin–norepinephrine–dopamine releasing agent (SNDRA). The EC_{50} values for induction of monoamine release in rat brain synaptosomes have been reported for the individual enantiomers of 6-MBPB. In the case of (S)-6-MBPB, they were 54 nM for serotonin, 77 nM for norepinephrine, and 41 nM for dopamine, whereas for (R)-6-MBPB, they were 172 nM for serotonin, 227 nM for norepinephrine, and inactive for dopamine. Hence, (S)-6-MBPB is an SNDRA, whereas (R)-MBPB is a serotonin–norepinephrine releasing agent (SNRA). The enantiomers showed a mixed profile of acting as full versus partial releasers. Unlike 5-MAPB, it is a relatively weak serotonin 5-HT_{1B} receptor agonist. 6-MBPB partially substituted for MDMA in animal drug discrimination tests at lower doses and fully substituted for MDMA at the highest dose, suggesting that it has entactogen-like effects.

Along with 5-MBPB, 6-MBPB was patented by Matthew Baggott and Tactogen in 2021. It was first described in the scientific literature by 2022. 6-MBPB, along with other drugs like 5-MBPB, is being investigated as a novel MDMA-like drug for potential therapeutic purposes in medicine.

== See also ==
- Substituted benzofuran
- 5-MBPB (5-MABB)
