= TACT833 =

Clinical data
- Other names: TACT-833
- Drug class: Monoamine transporter modulator; Serotonin 5-HT_{1B} receptor modulator
- ATC code: None

TACT833 is a monoamine transporter modulator and serotonin 5-HT_{1B} receptor modulator which is under development for the treatment of alcohol use disorder, anorexia, and binge-eating disorder. It is being developed by Tactogen. As of the first quarter of 2025, the drug is in the preclinical research stage of development. The exact chemical structure of TACT833 does not yet appear to have been disclosed, but it may be a benzofuran like 5-MAPB, 6-MAPB, BK-5-MAPB, or BK-6-MAPB.

== See also ==
- TACT411
- TACT908
- 1Z2MAP1O
- List of investigational hallucinogens and entactogens
