= BK-6-MAPB =

Clinical data
- Other names: BK-6-MAPB; NM-PrBF6; 6-[2-(Methylamino)propanoyl]benzofuran
- Routes of administration: Oral
- Drug class: Serotonin releasing agent; Serotonin 5-HT_{1B} receptor agonist; Entactogen
- ATC code: None

Identifiers
- IUPAC name: 1-(1-benzofuran-6-yl)-2-(methylamino)propan-1-one
- PubChem CID: 163982955
- ChemSpider: 129893181
- ChEMBL: ChEMBL5397645

Chemical and physical data
- Formula: C_{12}H_{13}NO_{2}
- Molar mass: 203.241 g·mol^{−1}
- 3D model (JSmol): Interactive image
- SMILES: CNC(C(=O)c1ccc2c(c1)occ2)C
- InChI: InChI=1S/C12H13NO2/c1-8(13-2)12(14)10-4-3-9-5-6-15-11(9)7-10/h3-8,13H,1-2H3; Key:SZYQYVVTRVJIPK-UHFFFAOYSA-N

βk-6-MAPB, or BK-6-MAPB, also known as NM-PrBF6 or as 6-[2-(methylamino)propanoyl]benzofuran, is a putative entactogen of the benzofuran and cathinone groups. It was patented by Matthew Baggott and Tactogen. The drug is known to act as a potent serotonin releasing agent. In addition, unlike MDMA, it is a potent serotonin 5-HT_{1B} receptor agonist. βk-6-MAPB was encountered as a novel designer drug online in 2019.

== See also ==
- Substituted benzofuran
- Substituted cathinone
- βk-5-MAPB, 5-MAPB, and 6-MAPB
- TACT411 and TACT833
