= Dimemebfe =

Psychedelic drug

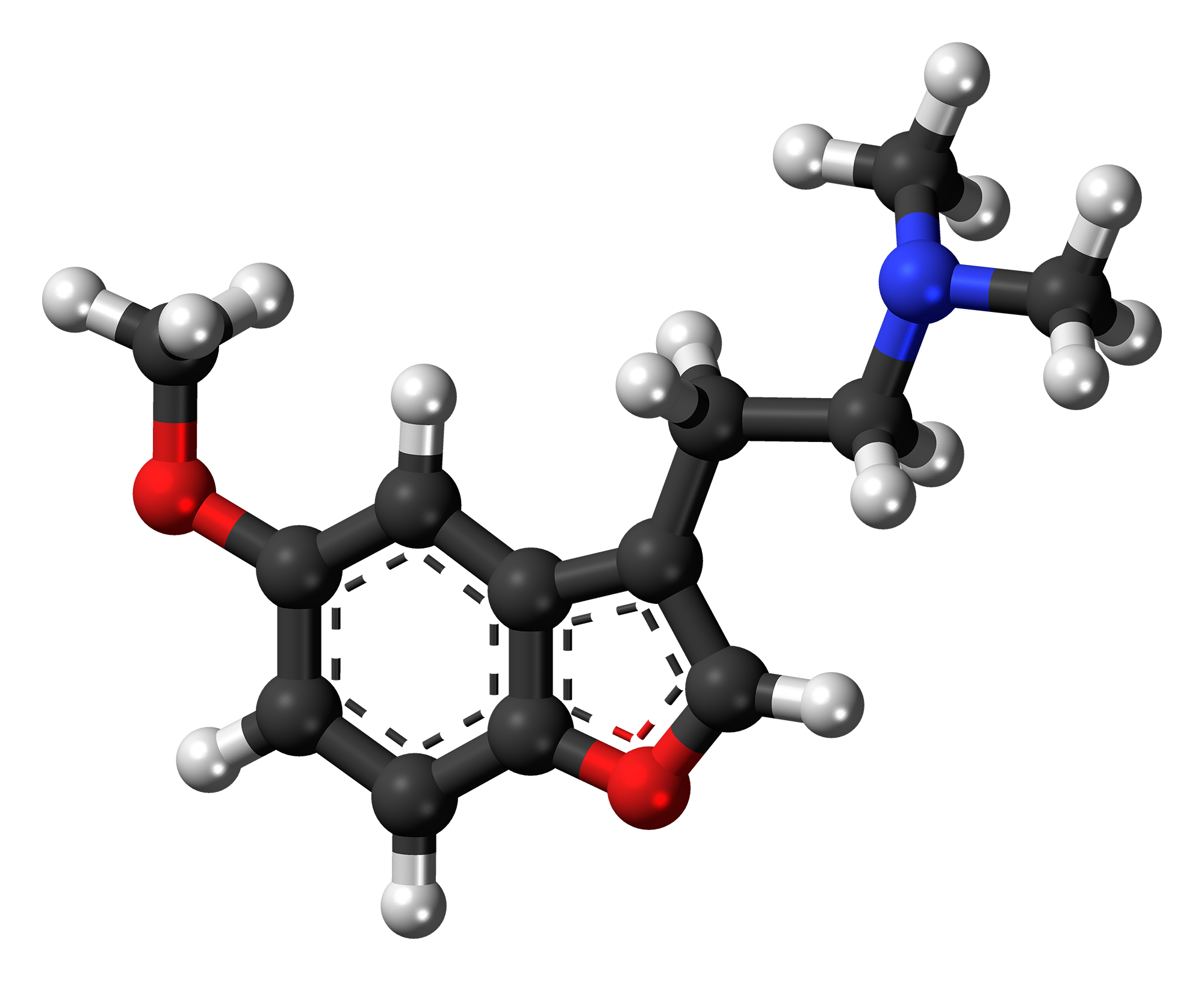

Clinical data
- Other names: 5-Methoxy-N,N-dimethyl-3-(2-aminoethyl)benzofuran; N,N-Dimethyl-5-methoxy-benzofuranylethylamine; 5-MeO-BFE; 5-MeO-DMBF; 1-Oxa-5-MeO-DMT; O-5-MeO-DMT; "Head f--k"; "Head fuck"
- Drug class: Serotonin receptor modulator; Serotonergic psychedelic; Hallucinogen
- ATC code: None

Legal status
- Legal status: DE: NpSG (Industrial and scientific use only); UK: Class A; US: Unscheduled and not FDA approved

Identifiers
- IUPAC name: 2-(5-Methoxy-1-benzofuran-3-yl)-N,N-dimethylethanamine
- CAS Number: 140853-58-3
- PubChem CID: 126589
- ChemSpider: 112474
- UNII: 9JXZ3RM7Y9
- CompTox Dashboard (EPA): DTXSID80161481

Chemical and physical data
- Formula: C_{13}H_{17}NO_{2}
- Molar mass: 219.284 g·mol^{−1}
- 3D model (JSmol): Interactive image
- SMILES: CN(C)CCc1coc(c1c2)ccc2OC
- InChI: InChI=1S/C13H17NO2/c1-14(2)7-6-10-9-16-13-5-4-11(15-3)8-12(10)13/h4-5,8-9H,6-7H2,1-3H3; Key:WBPQJTBOQCCTFX-UHFFFAOYSA-N

Dimemebfe, also known as 5-methoxy-N,N-dimethyl-3-(2-aminoethyl)benzofuran (5-MeO-BFE or 5-MeO-DMBF) or as 1-oxa-5-MeO-DMT, is a psychedelic drug of the benzofuran family related to the psychedelic tryptamine 5-MeO-DMT. It is the analogue and bioisostere of 5-MeO-DMT in which the nitrogen atom of the indole ring has been replaced with an oxygen atom, making dimemebfe a benzofuran rather than tryptamine derivative. The drug has been encountered as a novel designer drug.

== Pharmacology ==
=== Pharmacodynamics ===
Dimemebfe acts as an agonist of the serotonin 5-HT_{1A} and 5-HT_{2} family of serotonin receptors. It is several times less potent as a serotonin receptor agonist than 5-MeO-DMT and with relatively more activity at the serotonin 5-HT_{1A} receptor, but still shows strongest actions at the 5-HT_{2} family of receptors.

== Chemistry ==
=== Synthesis ===
The chemical synthesis of dimemembfe has been described.

=== Analogues ===
Analogues of dimemebfe include the benzofurans 5-MeO-DiBF (1-oxa-5-MeO-DiPT), 3-APB (1-oxa-AMT), and mebfap (5-MeO-3-APB; 1-oxa-5-MeO-AMT), the benzothiophene S-DMT (1-thia-DMT), and the tryptamine 5-MeO-DMT, among others.

== History ==
Dimemebfe was first described in the scientific literature by David E. Nichols and colleagues in 1992. Subsequently, it emerged as a novel designer drug by 2012.

== Society and culture ==
=== Legal status ===
==== Canada ====
Dimemebfe is not a controlled substance in Canada as of 2025.

==== United States ====
Dimemebfe is not an explicitly controlled substance in the United States. However, it could be considered a controlled substance under the Federal Analogue Act if intended for human consumption.

Dimemebfe is a Schedule I controlled substance in the United States state of Alabama.

== See also ==
- Substituted benzofuran
- Substituted tryptamine § Related compounds
