= Benzofury =

Benzofury is a slang term that may refer to the following recreational drugs:

- 5-APB
- 5-MAPB
- 6-APB
- 6-MAPB
