= 7-APB =

Clinical data
- Other names: 7-(2-Aminopropyl)benzofuran; 7-APB
- Drug class: Serotonin–norepinephrine–dopamine releasing agent (SNDRA)

Identifiers
- IUPAC name: 1-(1-benzofuran-7-yl)propan-2-amine
- CAS Number: 286834-87-5
- PubChem CID: 10130548
- ChemSpider: 8306063
- UNII: 7Z84HMW68V
- CompTox Dashboard (EPA): DTXSID201043370

Chemical and physical data
- Formula: C_{11}H_{13}NO
- Molar mass: 175.231 g·mol^{−1}
- 3D model (JSmol): Interactive image
- SMILES: CC(CC1=CC=CC2=C1OC=C2)N
- InChI: InChI=1S/C11H13NO/c1-8(12)7-10-4-2-3-9-5-6-13-11(9)10/h2-6,8H,7,12H2,1H3; Key:YVMDMFRZSDUZLK-UHFFFAOYSA-N

7-(2-Aminopropyl)benzofuran (7-APB) is a monoamine releasing agent and designer drug of the benzofuran family, albeit with a potency an order of magnitude less than 6-APB. It acts as a serotonin–norepinephrine–dopamine releasing agent (SNDRA). The drug was detected as a novel designer drug, in Europe, by 2013.

== See also ==
- Substituted benzofuran
