= Mebfap =

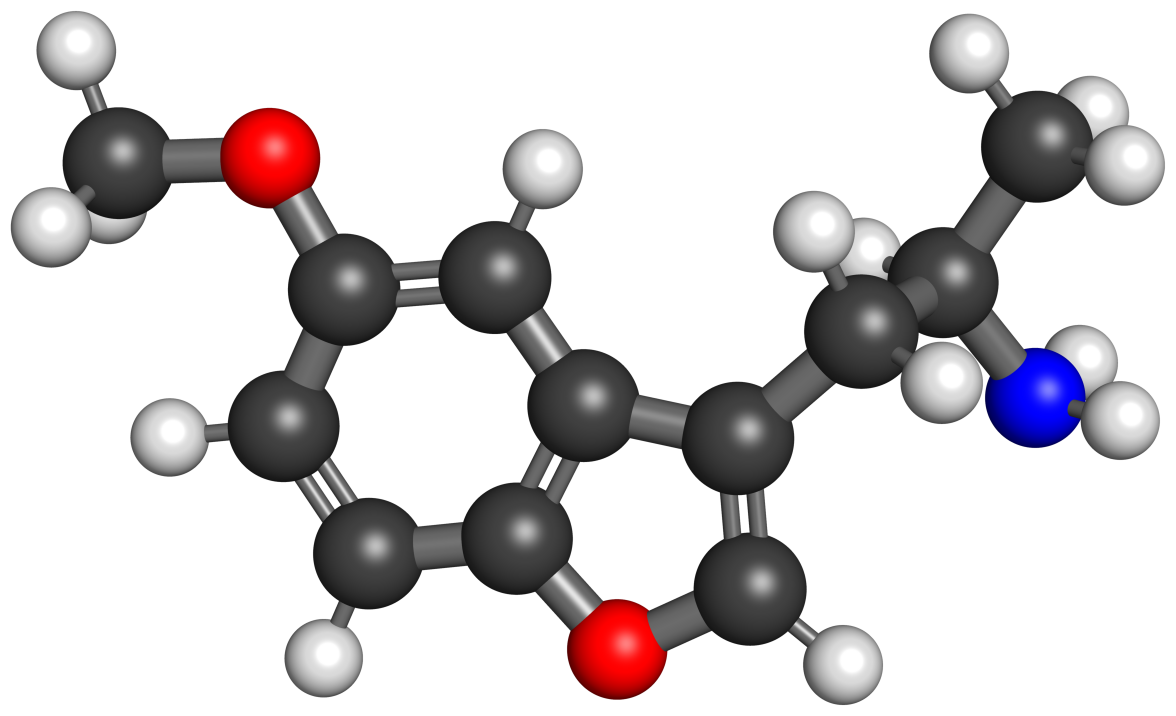

Clinical data
- Other names: MEBFAP; 1-(5-Methoxybenzofuran-3-yl)-2-aminopropane; 5-Methoxy-3-(2-aminopropyl)benzofuran; 3-(2-Aminopropyl)-5-methoxybenzofuran; 5-MeO-3-APB
- Drug class: Serotonin receptor modulator

Identifiers
- IUPAC name: 1-(5-methoxy-1-benzofuran-3-yl)propan-2-amine
- CAS Number: 140853-59-4
- PubChem CID: 3025750
- ChemSpider: 2291437
- ChEMBL: ChEMBL304628

Chemical and physical data
- Formula: C_{12}H_{15}NO_{2}
- Molar mass: 205.257 g·mol^{−1}
- 3D model (JSmol): Interactive image
- SMILES: CC(CC1=COC2=C1C=C(C=C2)OC)N
- InChI: InChI=1S/C12H15NO2/c1-8(13)5-9-7-15-12-4-3-10(14-2)6-11(9)12/h3-4,6-8H,5,13H2,1-2H3; Key:PMAFEFSQHHKAKM-UHFFFAOYSA-N

Mebfap, also known as 1-(5-methoxybenzofuran-3-yl)-2-aminopropane or 5-methoxy-3-(2-aminopropyl)benzofuran (5-MeO-3-APB) as well as 1-oxa-5-MeO-AMT, is a serotonin receptor modulator of the benzofuran family related to the psychedelic tryptamine 5-MeO-AMT. It is the analogue and bioisostere of 5-MeO-AMT in which the nitrogen atom of the indole ring has been replaced with an oxygen atom, resulting in the drug being a benzofuran rather than tryptamine derivative. Mebfap is a ligand of serotonin receptors similarly to 5-MeO-AMT, but shows about 6-fold lower affinity than 5-MeO-AMT. It was first described in the scientific literature by David E. Nichols and colleagues by 1992.

== See also ==
- Substituted benzofuran
- Substituted tryptamine § Related compounds
- 3-APB
- Dimemebfe (5-MeO-BFE)
- 5-MeO-DiBF
- 3-APBT
- 1ZP2MA
- α-Methylisotryptamine
