= 5-EAPB =

Chemical compound

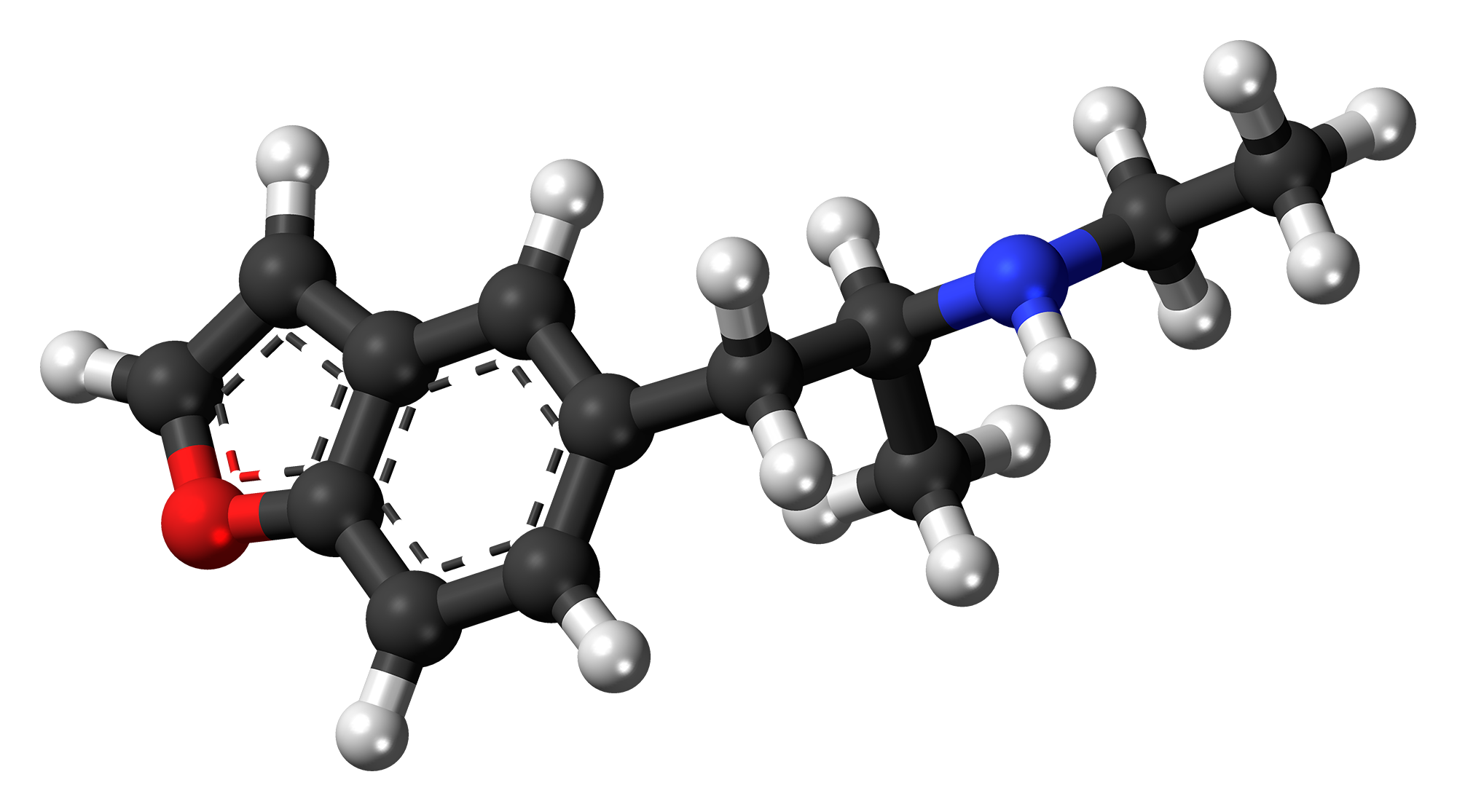

Clinical data
- Other names: 5-(2-(Ethylamino)propyl)benzofuran; 1-(Benzofuran-5-yl)-N-ethylpropan-2-amine
- Routes of administration: Oral
- Drug class: Entactogen
- ATC code: None

Legal status
- Legal status: BR: Class F2 (Prohibited psychotropics); CA: Schedule I; DE: NpSG (Industrial and scientific use only); UK: Class B

Identifiers
- IUPAC name: 1-(1-benzofuran-5-yl)-N-ethylpropan-2-amine
- CAS Number: 1445566-01-7
- PubChem CID: 102336590
- ChemSpider: 32078888
- UNII: 889D8VM2SL
- CompTox Dashboard (EPA): DTXSID701010104

Chemical and physical data
- Formula: C_{13}H_{17}NO
- Molar mass: 203.285 g·mol^{−1}
- 3D model (JSmol): Interactive image
- SMILES: CC(NCC)CC1=CC(C=CO2)=C2C=C1
- InChI: InChI=1S/C13H17NO/c1-3-14-10(2)8-11-4-5-13-12(9-11)6-7-15-13/h4-7,9-10,14H,3,8H2,1-2H3; Key:ZBZDDOARNPAMSP-UHFFFAOYSA-N

5-EAPB, also known as 5-(2-(ethylamino)propyl)benzofuran, is a potentially entactogenic amphetamine and benzofuran which is structurally related to 5-MAPB and 5-APB. It might be predicted to show similar effects to these drugs in humans, but the pharmacology of 5-EAPB remains unstudied as of 2020.

5-EAPB is similar in structure to compounds such as 5-APB which are claimed to be agonists of the 5-HT_{2C} receptor as well as a triple monoamine reuptake inhibitor, however 5-EAPB is not listed as an example in this patent, and it is not yet established to what extent the activity of 5-EAPB resembles that of 5-APB.

== Society and culture ==
=== Legal status ===
==== Singapore ====
5-EAPB is listed in the Fifth Schedule of the Misuse of Drugs Act (MDA) and therefore illegal in Singapore as of May 2015.

==== United Kingdom ====
In the UK, all benzofurans are considered Class B drugs and are therefore illegal.

== See also ==
- Substituted benzofuran
