= 2-APB =

2-APB may refer to:

- 2-Aminoethoxydiphenyl borate
- 2-Aminopropylbenzofuran
