= 2-APB (entactogen) =

Clinical data
- Other names: 2-Aminopropylbenzofuran; 2-(2-Aminopropyl)benzofuran

Identifiers
- IUPAC name: 1-(1-benzofuran-2-yl)propan-2-amine
- CAS Number: 30455-73-3
- PubChem CID: 413938
- ChemSpider: 366504
- UNII: 6HWZ87T2JB

Chemical and physical data
- Formula: C_{11}H_{13}NO
- Molar mass: 175.231 g·mol^{−1}
- 3D model (JSmol): Interactive image
- SMILES: CC(CC1=CC2=CC=CC=C2O1)N
- InChI: InChI=1S/C11H13NO/c1-8(12)6-10-7-9-4-2-3-5-11(9)13-10/h2-5,7-8H,6,12H2,1H3; Key:QGLBWEFCBFEAPH-UHFFFAOYSA-N

2-APB, also known as 2-aminopropylbenzofuran, is a novel designer drug of the benzofuran family.

== See also ==
- Substituted benzofuran
- 2-MAPB
- Benzofuranylpropylaminopentane (BPAP)
- Brofaromine
- 2-APBT
- 3-APB
