= BK-5-MAPB =

Chemical compound

βk-5-MAPB

Clinical data
- Other names: BK-5-MAPB
- Routes of administration: Oral
- Drug class: Serotonin–norepinephrine–dopamine releasing agent; Serotonin 5-HT_{1B} receptor agonist; Entactogen; Stimulant

Identifiers
- IUPAC name: 1-(1-benzofuran-5-yl)-2-(methylamino)propan-1-one
- CAS Number: 2855950-94-4
- PubChem CID: 163585306
- ChemSpider: 129866921
- ChEMBL: ChEMBL5397369

Chemical and physical data
- Formula: C_{12}H_{13}NO_{2}
- Molar mass: 203.241 g·mol^{−1}
- 3D model (JSmol): Interactive image
- SMILES: CC(C(=O)C1=CC2=C(C=C1)OC=C2)NC
- InChI: InChI=1S/C12H13NO2/c1-8(13-2)12(14)10-3-4-11-9(7-10)5-6-15-11/h3-8,13H,1-2H3; Key:GKZGRACLZFHCFE-UHFFFAOYSA-N

βk-5-MAPB, or BK-5-MAPB, is an entactogen of the benzofuran and cathinone groups which is related to the entactogens 5-MAPB and methylone. It was patented by Matthew Baggott and Tactogen and is under investigation by Tactogen for potential medical use.

== Pharmacology ==
=== Pharmacodynamics ===
βk-5-MAPB acts as a monoamine releaser with selectivity for serotonin and has a similar potency to MDMA. In terms of monoamine release, (S)-βk-5-MAPB has shown a DAT/SERT ratio of 0.6 and a DAT/NET ratio of 2.7, while (R)-βk-5-MAPB has shown a DAT/SERT ratio of 18 and a DAT/NET ratio of 1.9. As such, (S)-βk-5-MAPB shows an entactogen-like monoamine release profile, while (R)-βk-5-MAPB shows a stimulant-like profile. In addition to its monoamine release, βk-5-MAPB, unlike MDMA, is a potent serotonin 5-HT_{1B} receptor agonist.

Monoamine release of βk-5-MAPB enantiomers
Compound	SERT	NET	DAT	DAT/NET ratio	DAT/SERT ratio
(S)-βk-5-MAPB	80.0	379.8	140.8	2.7	0.57
(R)-βk-5-MAPB	438.8	46.8	24.3	1.9	18
(RS)-MDMA	94.3	116.5	155.2	0.75	0.61
Note: The assay was performed by Michael Baumann and Donna Walther and was likely rat brain synaptosomes (including comparison with previously published data from this assay).

In rodent drug discrimination tests, (S)-βk-5-MAPB fully substitutes for MDMA whereas (R)-βk-5-MAPB partially substitutes for MDMA and dextroamphetamine at different doses, (R)-βk-5-MAPB and (S)-βk-5-MAPB both generalize to dextroamphetamine, and (S)-βk-5-MAPB but not (R)-βk-5-MAPB substitutes for DOM. Hence, (S)-βk-5-MAPB shows entactogen-, psychedelic-, and stimulant-like effects, whereas (R)-βk-5-MAPB shows more stimulant-like effects, some entactogen-like effects, and no psychedelic-like effects. In other tests, both (S)-βk-5-MAPB and (R)-βk-5-MAPB showed stimulant-like pro-impulsive effects, but (S)-βk-5-MAPB was more potent than (R)-βk-5-MAPB.

In contrast to MDMA and 5-MAPB, (S)-βk-5-MAPB does not appear to produce serotonergic neurotoxicity even with high-dose regimens in rats.

== See also ==
- Substituted benzofuran
- Substituted cathinone
- βk-6-MAPB, 5-MAPB, and 6-MAPB
- TACT411 and TACT833
- BK-5-MAPBT
