= BK-5-MAPBT =

Clinical data
- Other names: bk-5-MAPBT; β-Keto-5-MAPBT
- Drug class: Monoamine releasing agent; Serotonin 5-HT_{1B} receptor agonist; Entactogen
- ATC code: None

Identifiers
- IUPAC name: 1-(1-benzothiophen-5-yl)-2-(methylamino)propan-1-one
- CAS Number: 2106849-09-4
- PubChem CID: 165949396
- ChemSpider: 72779382

Chemical and physical data
- Formula: C_{12}H_{13}NOS
- Molar mass: 219.30 g·mol^{−1}
- 3D model (JSmol): Interactive image
- SMILES: CC(C(=O)C1=CC2=C(C=C1)SC=C2)NC
- InChI: InChI=1S/C12H13NOS/c1-8(13-2)12(14)10-3-4-11-9(7-10)5-6-15-11/h3-8,13H,1-2H3; Key:UUTCAMGZEOYTDB-UHFFFAOYSA-N

BK-5-MAPBT, also known as β-keto-5-MAPBT, is a possible entactogen of the benzothiophene and cathinone families. It is a potent monoamine releasing agent, including of serotonin and dopamine, and also acts as a potent serotonin 5-HT_{1B} receptor agonist. Conversely, norepinephrine release was not reported. Unlike non-cathinone benzothiophenes like 5-MAPBT and 6-MAPBT, BK-5-MAPBT is very weak or inactive as a serotonin 5-HT_{2B} receptor antagonist and monoamine oxidase A (MAO-A) inhibitor. It produces anxiolytic-like and antiobsessional-like effects in the marble burying test in rodents. BK-5-MAPBT has been studied and patented by Matthew J. Baggott of Tactogen.

== See also ==
- Substituted benzothiophene
- Substituted cathinone
- 5-MAPBT
- BK-5-MAPB
