= 6-MAPB =

Chemical compound

Clinical data
- Other names: 1-(Benzofuran-6-yl)-N-methylpropan-2-amine
- Routes of administration: Oral
- Drug class: Monoamine releasing agent; Serotonin 5-HT_{1B} receptor agonist

Legal status
- Legal status: CA: Schedule I; DE: NpSG (Industrial and scientific use only); UK: Class B

Pharmacokinetic data
- Duration of action: 6–8 hours

Identifiers
- IUPAC name: 1-(Benzofuran-6-yl)-N-methylpropan-2-amine
- CAS Number: 1354631-79-0
- PubChem CID: 122202866
- ChemSpider: 32078890
- UNII: 4J6PD2FN87
- CompTox Dashboard (EPA): DTXSID301010102

Chemical and physical data
- Formula: C_{12}H_{15}NO
- Molar mass: 189.258 g·mol^{−1}
- 3D model (JSmol): Interactive image
- SMILES: CC(NC)CC1=CC(OC=C2)=C2C=C1
- InChI: InChI=1S/C12H15NO/c1-9(13-2)7-10-3-4-11-5-6-14-12(11)8-10/h3-6,8-9,13H,7H2,1-2H3; Key:QLAAURQYEAEHBO-UHFFFAOYSA-N

6-MAPB (1-(benzofuran-6-yl)-N-methylpropan-2-amine) is an entactogen of the benzofuran family which is structurally related to 6-APB and MDMA. It is known to be a serotonin releasing agent and, unlike MDMA, a potent serotonin 5-HT_{1B} receptor agonist. The drug is not known to have been widely sold as a "designer drug" but has been detected in analytical samples taken from individuals hospitalised after using drug combinations that included other benzofuran derivatives. 6-MAPB was first encountered as a novel designer drug in 2013 and described in the scientific literature in 2014. It was banned in the United Kingdom in June 2013, along with 9 other related compounds which were thought to produce similar effects.

== See also ==
- Substituted benzofuran
- 5-MAPB, 5-APB, and 6-APB
- BK-5-MAPB and BK-6-MAPB
- TACT411 and TACT833
