= 2-MABB =

Clinical data
- Other names: 2-(2-(Methylamino)butyl)benzofuran
- ATC code: None

Identifiers
- IUPAC name: 1-(1-benzofuran-2-yl)-N-methylbutan-2-amine
- PubChem CID: 165361637
- ChemSpider: 129433796
- UNII: KYG6PCE4QD

Chemical and physical data
- Formula: C_{13}H_{17}NO
- Molar mass: 203.285 g·mol^{−1}
- 3D model (JSmol): Interactive image
- SMILES: CCC(CC1=CC2=CC=CC=C2O1)NC
- InChI: InChI=1S/C13H17NO/c1-3-11(14-2)9-12-8-10-6-4-5-7-13(10)15-12/h4-8,11,14H,3,9H2,1-2H3; Key:YBPPNDUCEMDPJZ-UHFFFAOYSA-N

2-MABB, also known as 2-(2-(methylamino)butyl)benzofuran, is a psychoactive drug of the substituted benzofuran family. It was encountered as a novel designer drug in Europe in 2016. The drug has been made a controlled substance in Sweden, Italy, and Russia.

== See also ==
- Substituted benzofuran
