= 5-APDB =

Chemical compound

Clinical data
- Other names: 5-(2-Aminopropyl)-2,3-dihydrobenzofuran; 3-Desoxy-MDA; EMA-4; BF5AP
- Routes of administration: Oral
- Drug class: Entactogen; Serotonin releasing agent; Serotonin receptor modulator
- ATC code: None

Legal status
- Legal status: BR: Class F2 (Prohibited psychotropics); CA: Schedule I; DE: NpSG (Industrial and scientific use only); UK: Class B

Identifiers
- IUPAC name: 1-(2,3-dihydro-1-benzofuran-5-yl)propan-2-amine
- CAS Number: 152624-03-8
- PubChem CID: 192601
- ChemSpider: 167143
- UNII: UI10BAJ8SH
- CompTox Dashboard (EPA): DTXSID70934560

Chemical and physical data
- Formula: C_{11}H_{15}NO
- Molar mass: 177.247 g·mol^{−1}
- 3D model (JSmol): Interactive image
- SMILES: CC(CC1=CC2=C(C=C1)OCC2)N
- InChI: InChI=1S/C11H15NO/c1-8(12)6-9-2-3-11-10(7-9)4-5-13-11/h2-3,7-8H,4-6,12H2,1H3; Key:PZTJXZKNTPCPJL-UHFFFAOYSA-N

5-APDB, also known as 5-(2-aminopropyl)-2,3-dihydrobenzofuran or as 3-desoxy-MDA, is an entactogen of the phenethylamine, amphetamine, and dihydrobenzofuran families. It is an analogue of MDA where the heterocyclic 3-position oxygen from the 3,4-methylenedioxy ring has been replaced by a methylene bridge. 6-APDB is an analogue of 5-APDB where the 4-position oxygen has been replaced by a methylene bridge instead. 5-APDB was developed by a team led by David E. Nichols at Purdue University as part of their research into non-neurotoxic analogues of MDMA and first described in 1993.

== Pharmacology ==
=== Pharmacodynamics ===
In animal drug discrimination studies, 5-APDB's effects generalize most closely to non-stimulant MDMA analogues such as MBDB and MMAI, while producing no substitution for LSD or amphetamine. In vitro studies show that 5-APDB acts as a highly selective serotonin releasing agent (SSRA), with IC_{50} values of 130 nM, 7,089 nM, and 3,238 nM for inhibiting the reuptake of serotonin, dopamine, and norepinephrine, respectively. It also has activities at serotonin receptors.

== Chemistry ==
5-APDB, also known as 5-(2-aminopropyl)benzofuran, is a phenethylamine, amphetamine, and benzofuran and an analogue of 3,4-methylenedioxyamphetamine (MDA).

=== Synthesis ===
The chemical synthesis of 5-APDB has been described.

=== Analogues ===
In contrast to 5-APDB, 6-APDB is more balanced on the three monoamine neurotransmitters and acts more similarly to MDA and MDMA.

Methoxy-substituted analogues of 5-APDB and 6-APDB have also been made and substituted for DOM in animal tests, although they were around one tenth as potent as DOM.

== History ==
5-APDB, along with 6-APDB, was described by David E. Nichols and colleagues at Purdue University as an MDMA analogue in 1993. Subsequently, the non-dihydrogenated benzofurans 5-APB and 6-APB emerged as novel designer drugs in 2010. Prior to this, 5-APB and 6-APB had been patented and first described by Eli Lilly and Company as serotonin 5-HT_{2C} receptor agonists for potential medical applications in 2000. 5-APB and 6-APB are often confused with 5-APDB and 6-APDB.

== Society and culture ==
=== Legal status ===
==== Canada ====
5-APDB is a Schedule I controlled substance in Canada due phenethylamine blanket-ban language.

==== China ====
As of October 2015 5-APDB is a controlled substance in China.

==== United Kingdom ====
On June 10, 2013, 5-APDB and a number of analogues were classified as Temporary Class Drugs in the UK following an ACMD recommendation. This means that sale and import of the named substances are criminal offences and are treated as for class B drugs.

==== United States ====
5-APDB is not an explicitly controlled substance in the United States. However, it could be considered a controlled substance under the Federal Analogue Act if intended for human consumption.

== See also ==
- Substituted benzofuran
