= MiPBF =

Clinical data
- Other names: Methylisopropylbenzofuran; MIPBF; N-Methyl-N-isopropyl-3-(2-aminoethyl)benzofuran; 1-Oxa-N-methyl-N-isopropyltryptamine; 1-Oxa-MiPT
- Drug class: Serotonin receptor modulator
- ATC code: None

Identifiers
- IUPAC name: N-[2-(1-benzofuran-3-yl)ethyl]-N-methylpropan-2-amine
- CAS Number: 127507-03-3
- PubChem CID: 117044241
- ChemSpider: 74414170

Chemical and physical data
- Formula: C_{14}H_{19}NO
- Molar mass: 217.312 g·mol^{−1}
- 3D model (JSmol): Interactive image
- SMILES: CC(C)N(C)CCC1=COC2=CC=CC=C21
- InChI: InChI=1S/C14H19NO/c1-11(2)15(3)9-8-12-10-16-14-7-5-4-6-13(12)14/h4-7,10-11H,8-9H2,1-3H3; Key:HNYJKEQVSSYBRE-UHFFFAOYSA-N

MiPBF, also known as N-methyl-N-isopropyl-3-(2-aminoethyl)benzofuran or as 1-oxa-N-methyl-N-isopropyltryptamine (1-oxa-MiPT), is a serotonin receptor modulator of the benzofuran family related to the psychedelic tryptamine methylisopropyltryptamine (MiPT). It is the analogue and bioisostere of MiPT in which the indole nitrogen has been replaced with an oxygen atom, making it a benzofuran rather than tryptamine derivative. The drug shows affinity for serotonin receptors, including the serotonin 5-HT_{1A}, 5-HT_{2A}, and 5-HT_{2B} receptors (IC_{50} = 5,000 nM, 500 nM, and 800 nM, respectively). Its affinities for these receptors were 7-fold, 13-fold, and 1.5-fold lower than those of MiPT, respectively. MiPBF was first described in the scientific literature by Dennis McKenna and David Repke and colleagues in 1990.

== See also ==
- Substituted benzofuran
- Substituted tryptamine § Related compounds
