= Substituted benzofuran =

Class of chemical compounds

General chemical structure of substituted benzofurans

The substituted benzofurans are a class of chemical compounds based on the heterocyclic and polycyclic compound benzofuran. Many medicines use the benzofuran core as a scaffold, but most commonly the term is used to refer to the simpler compounds in this class which include numerous psychoactive drugs, including stimulants, psychedelics and empathogens. In general, these compounds have a benzofuran core to which a 2-aminoethyl group is attached (at any position), and combined with a range of other substituents. Some psychoactive derivatives from this family have been sold under the street name Benzofury.

== Use and effects ==
Oral doses and durations of benzofurans and dihydrobenzofurans
Compound	Chemical name	Dose	Duration
2-APB	2-(2-Aminopropyl)benzofuran	Unknown	Unknown
3-APB	3-(2-Aminopropyl)benzofuran	Unknown	Unknown
4-APB	4-(2-Aminopropyl)benzofuran	Unknown	Unknown
5-APB	5-(2-Aminopropyl)benzofuran	60–80 mg (20–100 mg+)	3–8 hours
5-MAPB	5-(2-(Methylamino)propyl)benzofuran	30–70 mg (10–120 mg+)	4–8 hours
5-EAPB	5-(2-(Ethylamino)propyl)benzofuran	80 mg (50–150 mg+)	Unknown
5-MBPB	6-(2-(Methylamino)butyl)benzofuran	Unknown	Unknown
BK-5-MAPB	5-[2-(Methylamino)propanoyl]benzofuran	Unknown	Unknown
5-APDB	5-(2-Aminopropyl)-2,3-dihydrobenzofuran	100 mg (50–200 mg+)	Unknown
5-MAPDB	5-(2-(Methylamino)propyl)-2,3-dihydrobenzofuran	100 mg (50–150 mg+)	Unknown
6-APB	6-(2-Aminopropyl)benzofuran	80–100 mg (15–125 mg+)	6–9 hours
6-MAPB	6-(2-(Methylamino)propyl)benzofuran	50–100 mg (20–130 mg+)	6–8 hours
6-EAPB	6-(2-(Ethylamino)propyl)benzofuran	Unknown	Unknown
6-MBPB	6-(2-(Methylamino)butyl)benzofuran	Unknown	Unknown
BK-6-MAPB	6-[2-(Methylamino)propanoyl]benzofuran	Unknown	Unknown
6-APDB	6-(2-Aminopropyl)-2,3-dihydrobenzofuran	70 mg (20–130 mg+)	6–8 hours
6-MAPDB	6-(2-(Methylamino)propyl)-2,3-dihydrobenzofuran	Unknown	Unknown
7-APB	7-(2-Aminopropyl)benzofuran	Unknown	Unknown
Refs:

Benzofurans like 5-APB and 6-APB are said to have relatively minor psychedelic effects.

== Pharmacology ==
=== Pharmacodynamics ===
Activities of benzofurans and their MDxx relatives
Compound	Monoamine release (EC_{50}, nM)			Ref
Compound	5-HT	NE	DA	Ref
5-APB	19	21	31	
6-APB	36	14	10	
5-MAPB	64–90	24	41–459	
(S)-5-MAPB	67	ND	258	
(R)-5-MAPB	184	ND	1,951	
6-MAPB	33	14	20	
5-MABB (5-MBPB)	ND	ND	ND	
(S)-5-MABB	31	158	210	
(R)-5-MABB	49	850	IA	
6-MABB (6-MBPB)	ND	ND	ND	
(R)-6-MABB	172	227	IA	
(S)-6-MABB	54	77	41	
BK-5-MAPB	ND	ND	ND	ND
BK-6-MAPB	ND	ND	ND	ND
MDA	160–162	47–108	106–190	
MDMA	50–85	54–110	51–278	
MBDB	540	3,300	>100,000	
Methylone	234–708	140–270	117–220	
Notes: The smaller the value, the more strongly the compound produces the effect. The assays were done in rat brain synaptosomes and human potencies may be different. See also Monoamine releasing agent § Activity profiles for a larger table with more compounds.

Benzofurans like 5-APB and 6-APB act as serotonin–norepinephrine–dopamine releasing agents and as serotonin 5-HT_{2} receptor agonists. In addition, some benzofurans, including 5-MAPB, 6-MAPB, BK-5-MAPB, and BK-6-MAPB, have unexpectedly been found to be potent serotonin 5-HT_{1B} receptor agonists. Along with serotonin release and other actions, this property may be involved may be involved in their entactogenic effects. Conversely, MDMA is much less potent as an agonist of the serotonin 5-HT_{1B} receptor.

== Chemistry ==
Chemical structures of selected APBs
2-APB

3-APB

4-APB

5-APB

6-APB

7-APB
Structural comparison of 5-APB and 6-APB with other related phenethylamines
5-APB

6-APB

MDA

3-MA (MMA)

4-MA (PMA)

3,4-DMA

Mescaline (3,4,5-TMPEA)

MMDA
Chemical structures of tryptamine-like benzofurans
O-DMT (1-oxa-DMT, DMBF)

MiPBF (1-oxa-MiPT)

Dimemebfe (5-MeO-BFE; 1-oxa-5-MeO-DMT)

5-MeO-DiBF (1-oxa-5-MeO-DiPT)

3-APB (1-oxa-AMT)

Mebfap (5-MeO-3-APB; 1-oxa-5-MeO-AMT)

== History ==
The 2,3-dihydrobenzofurans 5-APDB and 6-APDB were described by David E. Nichols and colleagues at Purdue University as MDMA analogues in 1993. Subsequently, the benzofurans 5-APB and 6-APB emerged as novel designer drugs in 2010. Prior to this, they had been patented by Eli Lilly and Company as serotonin 5-HT_{2C} receptor agonists for potential treatment of eating disorders and seizures in 2000 and 2006. 5-APB and 6-APB are often confused with 5-APDB and 6-APDB. The pharmacology of various benzofurans and 2,3-dihydrobenzofurans was further clarified in the mid-2010s and thereafter.

== Society and culture ==
=== Legal status ===
Substituted benzofurans saw widespread use as recreational drugs by being sold as research chemicals making them exempt from drug legislation. Many of the more common compounds were banned in the UK in June 2013 as temporary class drugs, while others have been made permanently illegal in various jurisdictions.

== List of substituted benzofurans ==
The derivatives may be produced by substitutions at six locations of the benzofuran molecule, as well as saturation of the 2,3- double bond.

The following table displays notable derivatives that have been reported:

Structure	Compound	CAS #	R_{2}	R_{3}	R_{4}	R_{5}	R_{6}	R_{7}	Other
	2-APB	30455-73-3	2-aminopropyl	H	H	H	H	H	-
	2-MAPB	806596-15-6	2-(methylamino)propyl	H	H	H	H	H	-
	2-EAPB		2-(ethylamino)propyl	H	H	H	H	H	-
	2-MABB		2-(methylamino)butyl	H	H	H	H	H	-
	BPAP	260550-89-8	2-(propylamino)pentyl	H	H	H	H	H	-
	3-F-BPAP	501901-68-4	2-(3,3,3-trifluoropropylamino)pentyl	H	H	H	H	H	-
	Brofaromine	63638-91-5	4-piperidinyl	H	H	methoxy	H	bromo	-
	3-APB (1-oxa-AMT)	105909-13-5	H	2-aminopropyl	H	H	H	H	-
	O-DMT (1-oxa-DMT)		H	2-(dimethyl-amino)ethyl	H	H	H	H	-
	Dimemebfe (1-oxa-5-MeO-DMT)	140853-58-3	H	2-(dimethyl-amino)ethyl	H	methoxy	H	H	-
	Mebfap (1-oxa-5-MeO-AMT)	140853-59-4	H	2-aminopropyl	H	methoxy	H	H	-
	5-MeO-DiBF (1-oxa-5-MeO-DiPT)		H	2-(diisopropyl-amino)ethyl	H	methoxy	H	H	-
	MiPBF (1-oxa-MiPT)		H	2-(methylisopropyl-amino)ethyl	H	H	H	H	-
	4-APB	286834-82-0	H	H	2-aminopropyl	H	H	H	-
	DOB-5-hemiFLY (5-MeO-7-Br-4-APDB)		H	H	2-aminopropyl	methoxy	H	bromo	2,3-dihydro
	5-APB	286834-81-9	H	H	H	2-aminopropyl	H	H	-
	5-MAPB	1354631-77-8	H	H	H	2-(methylamino)propyl	H	H	-
	5-EAPB	1445566-01-7	H	H	H	2-(ethylamino)propyl	H	H	-
	5-APB-NBOMe		H	H	H	2-[(2-methoxybenzyl)-amino]propyl	H	H	-
	6-APB	286834-85-3	H	H	H	H	2-aminopropyl	H	-
	6-MAPB	1354631-79-0	H	H	H	H	2-(methylamino)propyl	H	-
	6-EAPB	1632539-47-9	H	H	H	H	2-(ethylamino)propyl	H	-
	5-AEDB		H	H	H	2-aminoethyl	H	H	2,3-dihydro
	5-APDB	152624-03-8	H	H	H	2-aminopropyl	H	H	2,3-dihydro
	5-MAPDB	1354631-78-9	H	H	H	2-(methylamino)propyl	H	H	2,3-dihydro
	5-EAPDB		H	H	H	2-(ethylamino)propyl	H	H	2,3-dihydro
	6-APDB	1354631-78-9	H	H	H	H	2-aminopropyl	H	2,3-dihydro
	6-MAPDB	1354631-81-4	H	H	H	H	2-(methylamino)propyl	H	2,3-dihydro
	6-EAPDB		H	H	H	H	2-(ethylamino)propyl	H	2,3-dihydro
	bk-5-MAPB		H	H	H	1-oxo-2-(methylamino)propyl	H	H	-
	bk-6-MAPB		H	H	H	H	1-oxo-2-(methylamino)propyl	H	-
	5-MBPB		H	H	H	2-(methylamino)butyl	H	H	-
	6-MBPB		H	H	H	H	2-(methylamino)butyl	H	-
	5-DBFPV	2117405-32-8	H	H	H	1-oxo-2-(pyrrolidin-1-yl)pentyl	H	H	2,3-dihydro
	6-MeO-5-APDB		H	H	H	2-aminopropyl	methoxy	H	2,3-dihydro
	F (F-1; 5-MeO-6-APDB)	99355-77-8	H	H	H	methoxy	2-aminopropyl	H	2,3-dihydro
	F-2	99355-74-5	methyl	H	H	methoxy	2-aminopropyl	H	2,3-dihydro
	F-22	952016-51-2	dimethyl	H	H	methoxy	2-aminopropyl	H	2,3-dihydro
	7-APB	286834-86-4	H	H	H	H	H	2-aminopropyl	-
	DOI-2-hemiFLY (4-I-5-MeO-7-APDB)		H	H	iodo	methoxy	H	2-aminopropyl	2,3-dihydro
The chemical structure of amiodarone, a class III antiarrhythmic drug.	Amiodarone	1951–25–3	propyl	3,5-diiodo-4-(2-diethylamino-ethoxy)benzoyl	H	H	H	H	-
	2C-B-FLY	733720–95–1	H	H	2-aminoethyl	5,6-dihydrofuro[5,6-f]	-	bromo	2,3-dihydro
	2C-B-DragonFLY (2C-B-DFLY)	260809–98–1	H	H	2-aminoethyl	furo[5,6-f]	-	bromo	-
	2C-C-FLY	1354633–83–2	H	H	2-aminoethyl	5,6-dihydrofuro[5,6-f]	-	chloro	2,3-dihydro
	2C-I-FLY	1354633–88–7	H	H	2-aminoethyl	5,6-dihydrofuro[5,6-f]	-	iodo	2,3-dihydro
	2C-D-FLY	1354634–07–3	H	H	2-aminoethyl	5,6-dihydrofuro[5,6-f]	-	methyl	2,3-dihydro
	2C-E-FLY		H	H	2-aminoethyl	5,6-dihydrofuro[5,6-f]	-	ethyl	2,3-dihydro
	2C-EF-FLY		H	H	2-aminoethyl	5,6-dihydrofuro[5,6-f]	-	2-fluoroethyl	2,3-dihydro
	2C-T-7-FLY	1354633–05–8	H	H	2-aminoethyl	5,6-dihydrofuro[5,6-f]	-	n-propylthio	2,3-dihydro
	2C-MeTriox		H	H	2-aminoethyl	5,6-methylenedioxy[5,6-f]	-	methyl	2,3-dihydro
	MeTriox		H	H	2-aminopropyl	5,6-methylenedioxy[5,6-f]	-	methyl	2,3-dihydro
	DOH-FLY (FLY, H-FLY)	219986-80-8	H	H	2-aminopropyl	5,6-dihydrofuro[5,6-f]	-	H	2,3-dihydro
	DragonFLY (DFLY, H-DFLY)	260809-94-7	H	H	2-aminopropyl	furo[5,6-f]	-	H	-
	DOB-FLY	219986–75–1	H	H	2-aminopropyl	5,6-dihydrofuro[5,6-f]	-	bromo	2,3-dihydro
	Bromo-DragonFLY (DOB-DFLY)	502759–67–3	H	H	2-aminopropyl	furo[5,6-f]	-	bromo	-
	DOB-2-DragonFLY-5-ButterFLY	1043541–82–7	H	H	2-aminopropyl	5,6-dihydropyrano	-	bromo	-
	DOM-FLY	748748–08–5	H	H	2-aminopropyl	5,6-dihydrofuro[5,6-f]	-	methyl	2,3-dihydro
	DOMOM-FLY		H	H	2-aminopropyl	5,6-dihydrofuro[5,6-f]	-	methoxymethyl	2,3-dihydro
	2C-B-FLY-NBOMe	1335331–42–4	H	H	2-[(2-methoxybenzyl)-amino]ethyl	5,6-dihydrofuro[5,6-f]	-	bromo	2,3-dihydro
	2C-B-DragonFLY-NBOH	1335331–45–7	H	H	2-[(2-hydroxybenzyl)-amino]ethyl	furo[5,6-f]	-	bromo	-
	TFMFly (DOTFM-FLY)	780744–19–6	H	H	2-aminopropyl	5,6-dihydrofuro[5,6-f]	-	trifluoromethyl	2,3-dihydro
	Mescaline-FLY (M-FLY; flyscaline)		H	H	2-aminoethyl	5,6-dihydrofuro[5,4-b]	-	methoxy	2,3-dihydro
	YM-348	372163–84–3	ethyl	H	1-(2-aminopropyl)-pyrazol[4,5-f]	-	H	H	-
	2-Desethyl-YM-348	748116–94–1	H	H	1-(2-aminopropyl)-pyrazol[4,5-f]	-	H	H	-

== See also ==
- Substituted methylenedioxyphenethylamine § Related compounds
- Substituted 2-aminoindane
- Substituted amphetamine
- Substituted benzothiophene
- Substituted cathinone
- Substituted methylenedioxyphenethylamine
- Substituted methoxyphenethylamine
- Substituted naphthylethylamine
- Substituted phenethylamine
- Substituted tryptamine
- Aminopropylindole
