= 6-EAPB =

Psychedelic drug

Clinical data
- Other names: 1-(Benzofuran-6-yl)-N-ethylpropan-2-amine

Legal status
- Legal status: AU: Analogue of MDMA; CA: Schedule I; DE: NpSG (Industrial and scientific use only); UK: Class B; US: Analogue to a Schedule I/II drug (MDMA)

Identifiers
- IUPAC name: 1-(benzofuran-6-yl)-N-ethylpropan-2-amine
- CAS Number: 1632539-47-9
- ChemSpider: 57427400
- UNII: LWB2M746C9

Chemical and physical data
- Formula: C_{13}H_{17}NO
- Molar mass: 203.285 g·mol^{−1}
- 3D model (JSmol): Interactive image
- SMILES: CCNC(CC1=CC2=C(C=CO2)C=C1)C
- InChI: InChI=1S/C13H17NO.ClH/c1-3-14-10(2)8-11-4-5-12-6-7-15-13(12)9-11;/h4-7,9-10,14H,3,8H2,1-2H3;1H; Key:MUFUSNCKTVRMLR-UHFFFAOYSA-N

6-EAPB, also known as 1-(benzofuran-6-yl)-N-ethylpropan-2-amine, is a potentially psychedelic and potentially entactogenic drug of the benzofuran class; it is structurally related to 6-APB and MDMA.

== Pharmacology ==
=== Pharmacodynamics ===
6-EAPB is a potent monoamine reuptake inhibitor. It shows very low potency as a serotonin 5-HT_{2A} receptor agonist.

== Society and culture ==
=== Legal status ===
As an N-ethyl derivative of 6-APB, 6-EAPB fell outside the scope of the Temporary Class Drug ban issued by the Home Office on June 10, 2013. The ACMD has advised that 6-EAPB (and other benzofurans) are moved to Class B, this came into action on 10 June 2014.

== See also ==
- Substituted benzofuran
