= 5-MAPB =

Chemical compound

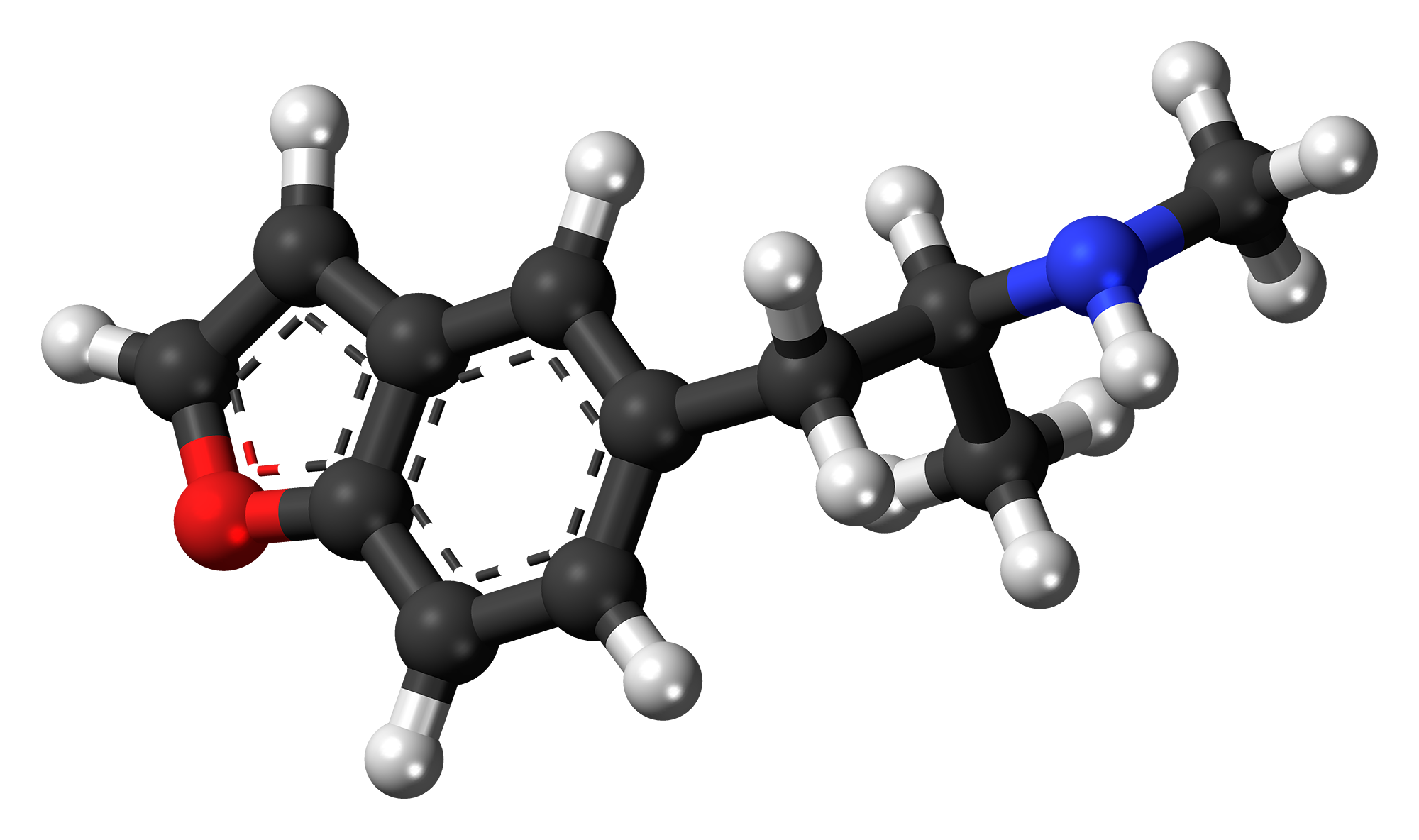

Clinical data
- Other names: 5-(N-Methyl-2-aminopropyl)benzofuran; MDMA 2.0; Gas Station Molly
- Routes of administration: Oral
- Drug class: Entactogen; Stimulant; Serotonin–norepinephrine–dopamine releasing agent; Serotonin 5-HT_{1B} receptor agonist; Serotonin 5-HT_{2} receptor agonist

Legal status
- Legal status: CA: Schedule I (catch-all clause); DE: NpSG (Industrial and scientific use only); UK: Class B; US: Not scheduled (but see Federal Analogue Act); Illegal in China

Pharmacokinetic data
- Duration of action: 5–6 hours

Identifiers
- IUPAC name: 1-(Benzofuran-5-yl)-N-methylpropan-2-amine
- CAS Number: 1354631-77-8
- PubChem CID: 102336592
- ChemSpider: 32078887
- UNII: XW34GUY2OY
- CompTox Dashboard (EPA): DTXSID801017189 DTXSID301010102, DTXSID801017189

Chemical and physical data
- Formula: C_{12}H_{15}NO
- Molar mass: 189.25 g/mol (freebase); 225.7 g/mol (HCl salt) g·mol^{−1}
- 3D model (JSmol): Interactive image
- SMILES: CC(NC)CC1=CC(C=CO2)=C2C=C1
- InChI: InChI=1S/C12H15NO/c1-9(13-2)7-10-3-4-12-11(8-10)5-6-14-12/h3-6,8-9,13H,7H2,1-2H3; Key:ZOVRTIPCNFERHY-UHFFFAOYSA-N

5-MAPB, also known as 5-(N-methyl-2-aminopropyl)benzofuran, as well as by nicknames such as "MDMA 2.0" and "Gas Station Molly", is an entactogen of the phenethylamine, amphetamine, and benzofuran families related to MDMA ("Ecstasy"). It is an analogue of MDMA in which one of the oxygen atoms of the benzodioxole ring has been replaced with a carbon atom. The drug is said to have the closest-known effects to MDMA of any other MDMA analogue, but to be less stimulating in comparison and to have less comedown or hangover. In addition, it is more potent than MDMA and has a longer duration.

The drug acts as a serotonin–norepinephrine–dopamine releasing agent (SNDRA) similarly to MDMA. It is also an agonist of several serotonin receptors, including the serotonin 5-HT_{1B}, 5-HT_{2A}, 5-HT_{2B}, and 5-HT_{2C} receptors. The drug produces serotonergic neurotoxicity in animals similarly to MDMA. Some notable analogues of 5-MAPB besides MDMA include other benzofurans like 5-APB, 5-MAPDB, and 6-MAPB.

5-MAPB was first encountered as a novel designer drug in 2013 and was described in the scientific literature in 2014. It is said to have been first synthesized in 2009. The drug has been patented by Tactogen for potential use as a medicine to treat psychiatric disorders. It is openly sold as a legal recreational drug in the United States. In addition to its use by itself, 5-MAPB is used as a component of the more closely MDMA-mimicking Borax combo.

== Use and effects ==
5-MAPB is an entactogen similarly to MDMA. Its dose is 30 to 70 mg orally and its duration is 5 to 6 hours. The drug has been described by Matthew Baggott as the MDMA analogue with the closest-known effects and so-called "magic" to MDMA itself. However, 5-MAPB is said to be less stimulating and energizing and to be "mellower" than MDMA. In addition, it has been anecdotally claimed to have much less of the comedown or hangover of MDMA. It appears to be about 2- or 3-fold more potent than MDMA and to have a duration about twice as long. Some users prefer 5-MAPB over MDMA. Other analogues of MDMA that similarly lack its full qualities include MBDB, methylone, 6-APDB, 5-APDB, 6-APB, 5-APB, MDAT, and MDAI, among others. Whereas certain other analogues like MDA and 6-APB are said to have mild psychedelic effects, 5-MAPB is said to be purely entactogenic. In addition to its use on its own, 5-MAPB, along with the related entactogen MDAI, is employed as a component of the MDMA-mimicking Borax combo, which is said to more closely mimic the effects of MDMA.

== Adverse effects ==
Adverse effects of 5-MAPB are similar to those of MDMA and may include dehydration and hyperthermia, among others. It may also cause serotonergic neurotoxicity like MDMA. There have been cases of hospitalization and death in association with 5-MAPB.

== Pharmacology ==
=== Pharmacodynamics ===
5-MAPB acts as a serotonin–norepinephrine–dopamine releasing agent with EC_{50} values for induction of monoamine release of 64 nM for serotonin, 24 nM for norepinephrine, and 41 nM for dopamine using rat brain synaptosomes. It is also a partial agonist of the serotonin 5-HT_{2A}, 5-HT_{2B}, and 5-HT_{2C} receptors. In addition, unlike MDMA, it is a relatively potent agonist of the serotonin 5-HT_{1B} receptor, with EC_{50} values of 161 nM for (S)-5-MAPB and 981 nM for (R)-5-MAPB.

Monoamine release of 5-MAPB enantiomers
Compound	SERT	NET	DAT	DAT/NET ratio	DAT/SERT ratio
(S)-5-MAPB	13.0	22.4	17.1	1.3	0.76
(R)-5-MAPB	29.3	60.0	191.6	0.31	0.15
(RS)-MDMA	94.3	116.5	155.2	0.75	0.61
Note: The assay was performed by Michael Baumann and Donna Walther and was likely rat brain synaptosomes (including comparison with previously published data from this assay).

Monoamine release of 5-MAPB and its enantiomers
Compound	SERT	NET	DAT	DAT/SERT ratio
(S)-5-MAPB	67	ND	258	0.26
75% (S)-5-MAPB	80	ND	632	0.13
(RS)-5-MAPB	90	ND	459	0.20
75% (R)-5-MAPB	122	ND	794	0.15
(R)-5-MAPB	184	ND	1951	0.09
Note: This assay used Chinese hamster ovary (CHO) cells expressing human monoamine transporters rather than the more typical rat brain synaptosomes assay.

5-MAPB has been marketed as a less- or non-neurotoxic alternative to MDMA. However, 5-MAPB has been found to be a dose-dependent serotonergic neurotoxin in rodents similarly to MDMA, and might also be a dopaminergic neurotoxin.

=== Pharmacokinetics ===
Little formal knowledge exists on 5-MAPB. It does not form the α-methyldopamine metabolite that contributes to the neurotoxicity of MDMA or MDA. A study in rats indicated that the major metabolites of 5-MAPB are 5-APB and 3-carboxymethyl-4-hydroxymethamphetamine.

== Chemistry ==
=== Synthesis ===
The chemical synthesis of 5-MAPB has been described.

=== Analogues ===
Analogues of 5-MAPB include 5-APB, 5-APDB, 5-MAPDB, 6-APB, 6-MAPB, bk-5-MAPB, 5-MBPB, and others.

== History ==
5-MAPB was first encountered as a novel designer drug in 2013 and described in the scientific literature in 2014. Ezekiel Golan has claimed that he first synthesized 5-MAPB in 2009.

== Society and culture ==
=== Recreational use ===
Voyager Labs by Judd Weiss openly sells 5-MAPB as a legal recreational drug in the United States as of the mid-2020s.

=== Legal status ===
==== Canada ====
5-MAPB is not an explicitly listed controlled substance in the Controlled Drugs and Substances Act in Canada. However, it is an implicitly controlled substance in this country under the act's phenethylamine and amphetamine catch-all clauses, which bans amphetamines as well as phenethylamine benzofurans.

==== China ====
As of October 2015, 5-MAPB is a controlled substance in China.

==== Finland ====
Scheduled in the "government decree on psychoactive substances banned from the consumer market".

==== Luxembourg ====
As of July 2021, 5-MAPB is not cited in the list of prohibited substances. Therefore, it is still a legal substance.

==== United Kingdom ====
5-MAPB was originally banned in the UK in June 2013 under a Temporary class drug order. On March 5, 2014, the UK Home Office announced that 5-MAPB would be made a class B drug on 10 June 2014 alongside every other benzofuran entactogen and many structurally related drugs.

==== United States ====
5-MAPB is not an explicitly controlled substance under the United States Controlled Substances Act. It is also not named as a controlled substance under California's Uniform Controlled Substances Act. However, 5-MAPB could be considered a controlled substance as an analogue of MDMA under the United States Federal Analogue Act.

== See also ==
- Substituted benzofuran
- TACT411 and TACT833
