= 3-APB =

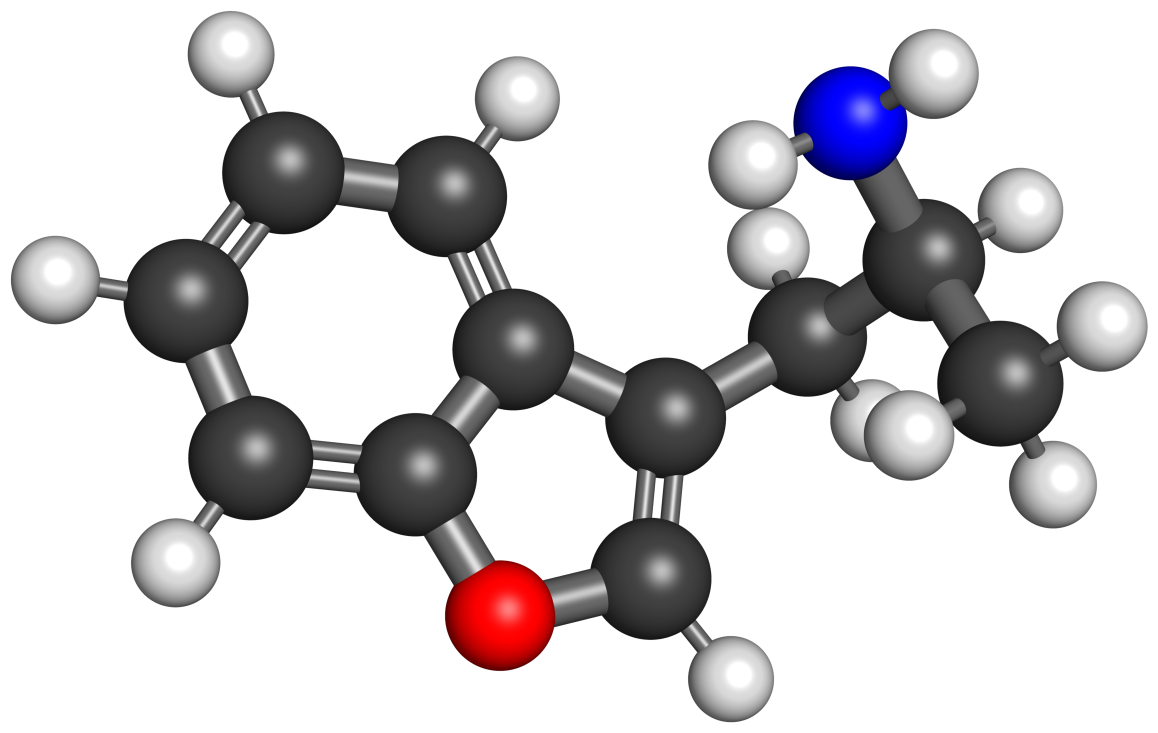

Clinical data
- Other names: 3-(2-Aminopropyl)benzofuran; 3-APB; 1-Oxa-α-methyltryptamine; 1-Oxa-AMT

Identifiers
- IUPAC name: 1-(1-benzofuran-3-yl)propan-2-amine
- CAS Number: 105909-13-5
- PubChem CID: 57014554
- ChemSpider: 45884773
- CompTox Dashboard (EPA): DTXSID701303480

Chemical and physical data
- Formula: C_{11}H_{13}NO
- Molar mass: 175.231 g·mol^{−1}
- 3D model (JSmol): Interactive image
- SMILES: CC(CC1=COC2=CC=CC=C21)N
- InChI: InChI=1S/C11H13NO/c1-8(12)6-9-7-13-11-5-3-2-4-10(9)11/h2-5,7-8H,6,12H2,1H3; Key:YOSBGWAOEQRQMP-UHFFFAOYSA-N

3-APB, also known as 3-(2-aminopropyl)benzofuran or as 1-oxa-α-methyltryptamine (1-oxa-AMT), is a drug of the benzofuran family related to the psychedelic tryptamine α-methyltryptamine (AMT). It is the analogue and bioisostere of AMT in which the nitrogen atom of the indole ring has been replaced with an oxygen atom, resulting in the drug being a benzofuran rather than tryptamine derivative.

The properties of 3-APB do not yet appear to have been reported. However, derivatives of 3-APB have been studied and described. An example is its 5-methoxy analogue mebfap (5-MeO-3-APB; a benzofuran analogue of 5-MeO-AMT), which is known to have high affinity for the serotonin 5-HT_{2} receptors. In addition, 3-APBT, the analogue of 3-APB with a sulfur atom instead of an oxygen atom, is a highly potent serotonin–norepinephrine–dopamine releasing agent (SNDRA) and serotonin receptor agonist, with psychedelic-like but not stimulant-like effects in animals.

Positional isomers of 3-APB such as 5-APB and 6-APB are monoamine releasing agents and entactogens of the amphetamine and benzofuran families. Besides 3-APBT, all of the possible positional isomers of the APBTs (i.e., 2-APBT through 7-APBT) are active as potent SNDRAs and at least some also as serotonin 5-HT_{2} receptor agonists.

== See also ==
- Substituted benzofuran
- Substituted tryptamine § Related compounds
- α-Methylisotryptamine (isoAMT)
- 1ZP2MA (indolizine analogue of AMT)
- 1Z2MAP1O (indolizine analogue of BK-NM-AMT)
- C-DMT and S-DMT
