= 3,4-Methylenedioxyamphetamine =

Entactogen, stimulant, and psychedelic drug of the amphetamine family

MDA INN: Tenamfetamine

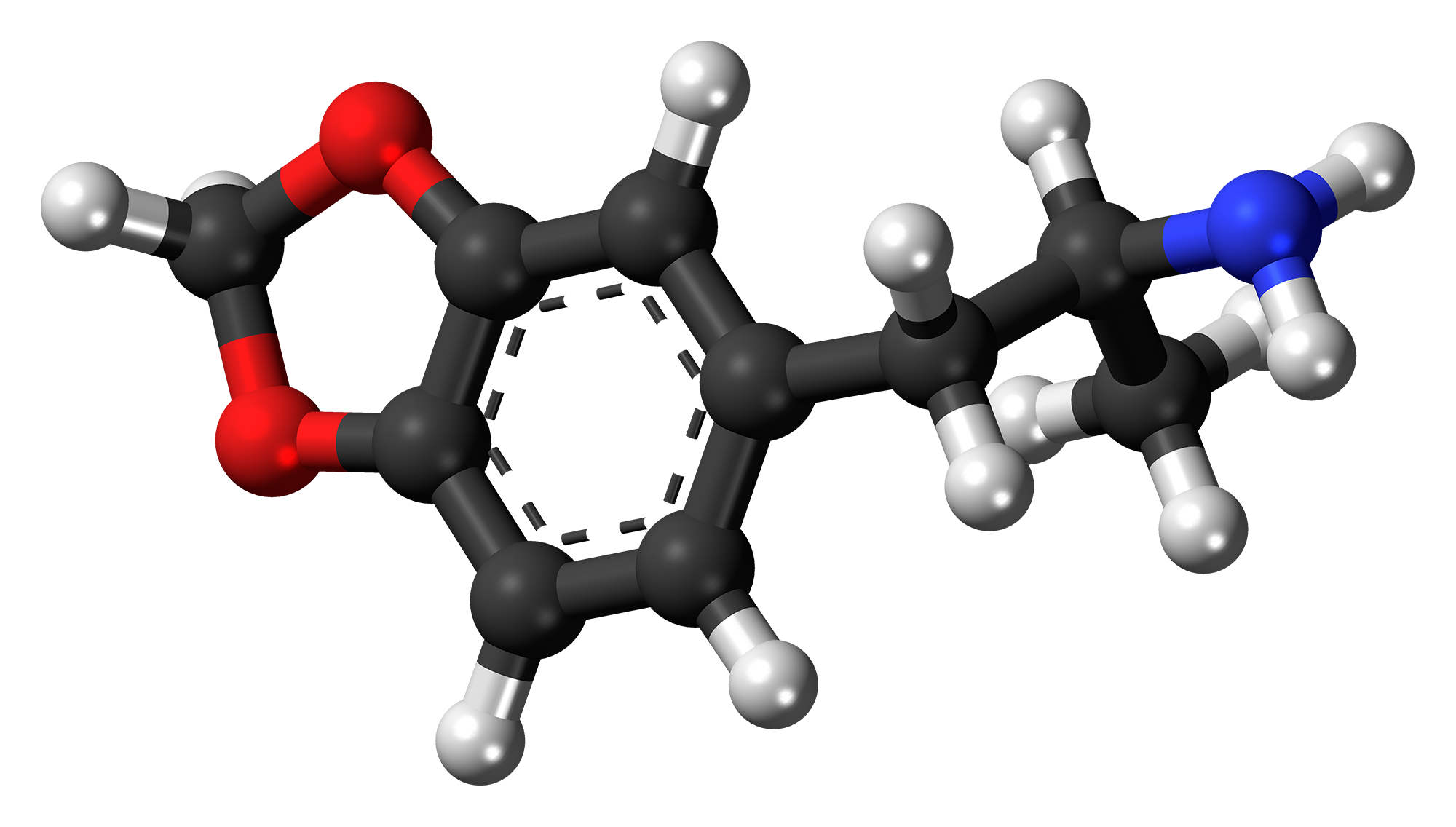

Clinical data
- Other names: MDA; Tenamfetamine; Amphedoxamine; Sally; Sassafras; Sass-a-frass; Sass; Mellow Drug of America; Hug drug; Love; 3,4-Methylenedioxy-α-methylphenethylamine; 5-(2-Aminopropyl)-1,3-benzodioxole; EA-1298; NSC-9978; NSC-27106; SKF-5
- Routes of administration: Oral, sublingual, insufflation, intravenous
- Drug class: Serotonin–norepinephrine–dopamine releasing agent; Serotonin 5-HT_{2} receptor agonist; Entactogen; Empathogen; Serotonergic psychedelic; Hallucinogen; Stimulant
- ATC code: None

Legal status
- Legal status: AU: S9 (Prohibited substance); BR: Class F2 (Prohibited psychotropics); CA: Schedule I; DE: Anlage I (Authorized scientific use only); UK: Class A; US: Schedule I; UN: Psychotropic Schedule I; EU: Fully prohibited; SE: Förteckning I

Pharmacokinetic data
- Metabolism: Hepatic (CYP extensively involved)
- Onset of action: 0.7 hours (range 0.3 to 1.1 hours); Peak: 2.0 hours (range 1.0–3.5 hours)
- Elimination half-life: 8.4–10.9 hours
- Duration of action: 5–8 hours (range 1–10 hours)
- Excretion: Renal

Identifiers
- IUPAC name: 1-(2H-1,3-Benzodioxol-5-yl)propan-2-amine
- CAS Number: 4764-17-4
- PubChem CID: 1614
- DrugBank: DB01509
- ChemSpider: 1555
- UNII: XJZ28FJ27W
- KEGG: D12715
- ChEBI: CHEBI:166520
- ChEMBL: ChEMBL6731
- CompTox Dashboard (EPA): DTXSID40859958
- ECHA InfoCard: 100.230.706

Chemical and physical data
- Formula: C_{10}H_{13}NO_{2}
- Molar mass: 179.219 g·mol^{−1}
- 3D model (JSmol): Interactive image
- SMILES: NC(C)CC1=CC2=C(C=C1)OCO2
- InChI: InChI=1S/C10H13NO2/c1-7(11)4-8-2-3-9-10(5-8)13-6-12-9/h2-3,5,7H,4,6,11H2,1H3; Key:NGBBVGZWCFBOGO-UHFFFAOYSA-N

3,4-Methylenedioxyamphetamine (MDA) is an entactogen, stimulant, and psychedelic drug of the amphetamine and MDxx families that is encountered mainly as a recreational drug. It is usually taken orally.

In terms of its pharmacology, MDA is a serotonin–norepinephrine–dopamine releasing agent (SNDRA) and a serotonin 5-HT_{2} receptor agonist, including of the serotonin 5-HT_{2A} receptor. It has a duration of 5 to 8 hours or around 6 hours typically.

MDA has a long history of psychotherapeutic and recreational use that predates that of MDMA, dating back to at least the mid-1960s. It has been described as the first entactogen. MDA has also been described as probably being the most popular analogue of MDMA. In most countries, the drug is a controlled substance and its possession and sale are illegal.

== Use and effects ==
MDA is bought, sold, and used as a recreational drug due to the compound's ability to uplift mood and increase empathy. It produces MDMA-like effects, including entactogenic and stimulant effects, as well as mild psychedelic effects.

The dose range of MDA given in Alexander Shulgin's book PiHKAL (Phenethylamines I Have Known and Loved) and other sources is 80 to 160 mg. A wider recreational dose range for MDA of 20 to 200 mg or more, with a typical dose estimate of 90 mg, has also been reported. The dose range of MDA is very similar to that of MDMA.

The effects of MDA include euphoria, empathy, emotional amplification, relaxation, feeling at peace with the world, increased introspection, self-awareness, and acceptance, authenticity, clarity of thought, a desire to communicate with others and relate personal issues, and emotional bonding with others. These effects led to MDA being called the "love drug" or "hug drug". MDA also produces mild psychedelic effects, including brightened colors, closed-eye visuals or complex mental imagery, synaesthesia, and rarely mild hallucinations. It does not produce profound sensory disruption or overt hallucinations. The drug has also been found to produce mystical or spiritual experiences.

MDA shares most of MDMA's qualitative and emotional effects, including entactogenic and stimulant effects. However, it has been said to be slightly less stimulating than MDMA. Conversely, a clinical study found that it was more stimulating than MDMA. In addition, MDA's hallucinogenic effects are much greater than those of MDMA, although still less than those of classical psychedelics like psilocybin. Another difference between the two drugs is that MDA appears to produce a more introverted and emotionally intense prosocial state, while MDMA encourages a more extroverted and gregarious prosocial state. MDA tends to produce more anxiety and fear than MDMA.

MDA produces sympathomimetic effects such as increased heart rate and blood pressure, among other physiological effects.

In terms of the individual enantiomers of MDA, (R)-MDA produces psychedelic effects and some entactogenic effects, while (S)-MDA is non-hallucinogenic, produces similar entactogenic effects as the racemate, and has considerable stimulant effects. High doses of enantiopure (R)-MDA, in the range of 120 to 200 mg, are described as closely resembling the effects of a 200 to 400 μg dose of LSD-25. Enantiopure (R)-MDA at high doses produces more robust psychedelic effects than typical doses of racemic MDA.

The duration of MDA is about 5 to 8 hours and is about 2 hours longer than that of MDMA (3–6 hours). Shulgin originally gave a duration of MDA of 8 to 12 hours in PiHKAL, but he later revised this down to only 3 to 6 hours. Modern clinical studies have given an average duration of 6 to 8 hours with a range of 0.9 to 10 hours. The drug's onset is 0.7 hours (range 0.3 to 1.1 hours) and its time to peak effects is 2.0 hours (range 1.0 to 3.5 hours).

== Side effects ==
Side effects of MDA include sympathomimetic effects like increased heart rate and blood pressure as well as increased cortisol and prolactin levels.

== Overdose ==
Symptoms of acute toxicity may include agitation, sweating, increased blood pressure and heart rate, dramatic increase in body temperature, convulsions, and death. Death is usually caused by cardiotoxicity. A 450 mg intravenous injection of MDA was found to result in death in one case.

== Pharmacology ==
=== Pharmacodynamics ===
Activities of MDA
Target	Affinity (K_{i}, nM)
SERT	5,600–>10,000 (K_{i}); 478–4,900 (IC_{50}); 160–162 (EC_{50}) (rat)
NET	13,000 (K_{i}); 150–420 (IC_{50}); 47–108 (EC_{50}) (rat)
DAT	>26,000 (K_{i}); 890–20,500 (IC_{50}); 106–190 (EC_{50}) (rat)
5-HT_{1A}	3,762–>10,000
5-HT_{1B}	>10,000
5-HT_{1D}	>10,000
5-HT_{1E}	>10,000
5-HT_{1F}	ND
5-HT_{2A}	3,200–>10,000 (K_{i}); 630–1,767 (EC_{50}); 57–99% (E_{max})
5-HT_{2B}	91–100 (K_{i}); 190–850 (EC_{50}); 51–80% (E_{max})
5-HT_{2C}	3,000–6,418 (K_{i}); 98–4,800 (EC_{50}); 79–118% (E_{max})
5-HT_{3}	>10,000
5-HT_{4}	ND
5-HT_{5A}	>10,000
5-HT_{6}	>10,000
5-HT_{7}	3,548
α_{1A}	8,700–>10,000
α_{1B}	>10,000
α_{1D}	ND
α_{2A}	1,100–2,600
α_{2B}	690
α_{2C}	229
β_{1}, β_{2}	>10,000
D_{1}–D_{5}	>10,000–>20,000
H_{1}–H_{4}	>10,000–>13,000
M_{1}–M_{5}	ND
nACh	ND
TAAR1	220–250 (K_{i}) (rat); 740 (EC_{50}) (rat); 86% (E_{max}) (rat); 160–180 (K_{i}) (mouse); 580 (EC_{50}) (mouse); 102% (E_{max}) (rat); 3,600 (EC_{50}) (human); 11% (E_{max}) (human)
I_{1}	>10,000
σ_{1}, σ_{2}	ND
Notes: The smaller the value, the more avidly the drug binds to the site. Proteins are human unless otherwise specified. Refs:

MDA is a substrate of the serotonin, norepinephrine, dopamine, and vesicular monoamine transporters, and in relation to this, acts as a reuptake inhibitor and releasing agent of serotonin, norepinephrine, and dopamine (that is, it is an SNDRA). It is also an agonist of the serotonin 5-HT_{2A}, 5-HT_{2B}, and 5-HT_{2C} receptors and shows affinity for the α_{2A}-, α_{2B}-, and α_{2C}-adrenergic receptors and serotonin 5-HT_{1A} and 5-HT_{7} receptors.

In addition to its actions as a monoamine releasing agent, MDA is a potent high-efficacy partial agonist or full agonist of the rodent TAAR1. Conversely, MDA is much weaker in terms of potency as an agonist of the human TAAR1. Moreover, MDA acts as a very weak partial agonist or antagonist of the human TAAR1 rather than as an efficacious agonist. TAAR1 activation is thought to auto-inhibit and constrain the effects of amphetamines that act as TAAR1 agonists, for instance MDMA in rodents.

MDA fully substitutes for MDMA in rodent drug discrimination tests. However, its prosocial effects in rodents are said to not fully resemble those of MDMA. MDA also substitutes for stimulants like dextroamphetamine and cocaine in drug discrimination tests. The (S)-optical isomer of MDA is more potent than the (R)-optical isomer as a psychostimulant, possessing greater activity at the monoamine transporters. MDA and (R)-MDA but not (S)-MDA fully substitute for serotonergic psychedelics including DOM, LSD, and mescaline. Similarly, MDA and (R)-MDA produce the head-twitch response, a behavioral proxy of psychedelic effects, in rodents. However, the head-twitch response they produce is very weak in magnitude compared to other related psychedelics such as the DOx drugs. On the other hand, the response is more similar in magnitude to that of Ariadne.

In terms of the subjective and behavioral effects of MDA, it is thought that serotonin release is required for its entactogenic effects, dopamine release is required for its euphoriant (rewarding and addictive) effects, dopamine and norepinephrine release are required for its psychostimulant effects, and direct agonism of the serotonin 5-HT_{2A} receptor is required for its mild psychedelic effects. The entactogenic effects of drugs like MDA are thought to be dependent on a precise balance of serotonin and dopamine release as well as serotonin receptor agonism. The longer duration of MDA compared to MDMA appears to be related to pharmacodynamics as opposed to pharmacokinetics, for instance the effects of MDA depending relatively more on serotonin 5-HT_{2A} receptor agonism than on serotonin release.

MDA can produce serotonergic neurotoxic effects in rodents. This might in part be due to metabolism of MDA. In addition, MDA activates a response of the neuroglia, though this subsides after use.

Activities of MDMA, its enantiomers, and related compounds
Compound	Monoamine release (EC_{50}, nM)		
Compound	Serotonin	Norepinephrine	Dopamine
Amphetamine	ND	ND	ND
(S)-Amphetamine (d)	698–1,765	6.6–7.2	5.8–24.8
(R)-Amphetamine (l)	ND	9.5	27.7
Methamphetamine	ND	ND	ND
(S)-Methamphetamine (d)	736–1,292	12.3–13.8	8.5–24.5
(R)-Methamphetamine (l)	4,640	28.5	416
MDA	160	108	190
(S)-MDA (d)	100	50	98
(R)-MDA (l)	310	290	900
MDMA	49.6–72	54.1–110	51.2–278
(S)-MDMA (d)	74	136	142
(R)-MDMA (l)	340	560	3,700
MDEA	47	2,608	622
MBDB	540	3,300	>100,000
MDAI	114	117	1,334
Notes: The smaller the value, the more strongly the compound produces the effect. Refs:

MDA, MDMA, and enantiomers at serotonin 5-HT_{2} receptors
Compound	5-HT_{2A}		5-HT_{2B}		5-HT_{2C}	
Compound	EC_{50} (nM)	E_{max}	EC_{50} (nM)	E_{max}	EC_{50} (nM)	E_{max}
Serotonin	53	92%	1.0	100%	22	91%
MDA	1,700	57%	190	80%	ND	ND
(S)-MDA (d)	18,200	89%	100	81%	7,400	73%
(R)-MDA (l)	5,600	95%	150	76%	7,400	76%
MDMA	6,100	55%	2,000–>20,000	32%	ND	ND
(S)-MDMA (d)	10,300	9%	6,000	38%	2,600	53%
(R)-MDMA (l)	3,100	21%	900	27%	5,400	27%
Notes: The smaller the K_{act} or EC_{50} value, the more strongly the compound produces the effect. Refs:

=== Pharmacokinetics ===
The pharmacokinetics of MDA have been studied. Its duration of action has been reported to be about 6 to 8 hours. The duration of MDA is longer than that of MDMA, about 8 hours for MDA versus 6 hours for MDMA. The elimination half-life of MDA is 10.9 hours. Differences in the duration of MDA versus MDMA may be due pharmacodynamics rather than pharmacokinetics.

== Chemistry ==
MDA is a substituted methylenedioxylated phenethylamine and amphetamine derivative. In relation to other phenethylamines and amphetamines, it is the 3,4-methylenedioxy and α-methyl derivative of phenethylamine, the 3,4-methylenedioxy derivative of amphetamine, and the N-desmethyl derivative of MDMA. The compound is a racemic mixture of (S)- and (R)-enantiomers, (S)-MDA and (R)-MDA.

Chemical structures of MDA enantiomers
(S)-MDA

(R)-MDA

It is a common contaminant of illicitly produced MDMA.

=== Synonyms ===
In addition to 3,4-methylenedioxyamphetamine, MDA is also known by other chemical synonyms such as the following:

- α-Methyl-3,4-methylenedioxy-β-phenylethylamine
- 1-(3,4-Methylenedioxyphenyl)-2-propanamine
- 1-(1,3-Benzodioxol-5-yl)-2-propanamine

=== Synthesis ===
MDA is typically synthesized from essential oil derived chemicals such as safrole or piperonal. Common approaches from these precursors include:

- Bromination of safrole's alkene functional group followed by amine alkylation procedure a:

=== Detection in body fluids ===
MDA may be quantitated in blood, plasma or urine to monitor for use, confirm a diagnosis of poisoning or assist in the forensic investigation of a traffic or other criminal violation or a sudden death. Some drug abuse screening programs rely on hair, saliva, or sweat as specimens. Most commercial amphetamine immunoassay screening tests cross-react significantly with MDA and major metabolites of MDMA, but chromatographic techniques can easily distinguish and separately measure each of these substances. The concentrations of MDA in the blood or urine of a person who has taken only MDMA are, in general, less than 10% those of the parent drug.

=== Analogues and derivatives ===
Analogues of MDA include its positional isomer 2,3-methylenedioxyamphetamine (2,3-MDA) and others. MDMA is the N-methyl derivative of MDA. Some other analogues of MDA include 5-APB, 6-APB, 5-APDB, 6-APDB, 5-APBT, 6-APBT, and SDA (3T-MDA), among others.

MDA constitutes part of the core structure of the β-adrenergic receptor agonist protokylol.

== History ==
MDA was first synthesized by Carl Mannich and Willy Jacobsohn in 1910. It was first taken in July 1930 by Gordon Alles at a total dose of 126 mg, who experienced hallucinogenic effects, well-being and euphoria, and peripheral effects. However, he did not subsequently describe these effects until 1959. Alles later licensed the drug to Smith, Kline & French. MDA was first used in animal tests in 1939, and human trials began in 1941 in the exploration of possible therapies for Parkinson's disease. However, it was found to be detrimental in people with Parkinson's disease. The drug was described as having analeptic effects in humans in 1953. From 1949 to 1957, more than five hundred human subjects were given MDA in an investigation of its potential use as an antidepressant or appetite suppressant by Smith, Kline & French.

The United States Army also experimented with the drug, code named EA-1298, while working to develop a truth drug or incapacitating agent. Harold Blauer died in January 1953 after being intravenously injected, without his knowledge or consent, with 450 mg of the drug as part of Project MKUltra. MDA was patented as an ataractic by Smith, Kline & French in 1960, and as an anorectic under the trade name "Amphedoxamine" in 1961. MDA began to appear on the recreational drug scene around 1963 to 1964. It was then inexpensive and readily available as a research chemical from several scientific supply houses. The drug was studied as part of entactogen-assisted psychotherapy by Claudio Naranjo and then by Richard Yensen in the 1960s and 1970s, respectively.

The International Nonproprietary Name (INN) tenamfetamine was recommended by the World Health Organization (WHO) in 1986. It was recommended in the same published list in which the INN of 2,5-dimethoxy-4-bromoamphetamine (DOB), brolamfetamine, was recommended. These events suggest that MDA and DOB were under development as potential pharmaceutical drugs at the time. The Multidisciplinary Association for Psychedelic Studies (MAPS) was also founded in 1986.

Matthew J. Baggott and colleagues conducted some of the first modern clinical studies of MDA in humans and published their findings in the 2010s.

== Society and culture ==
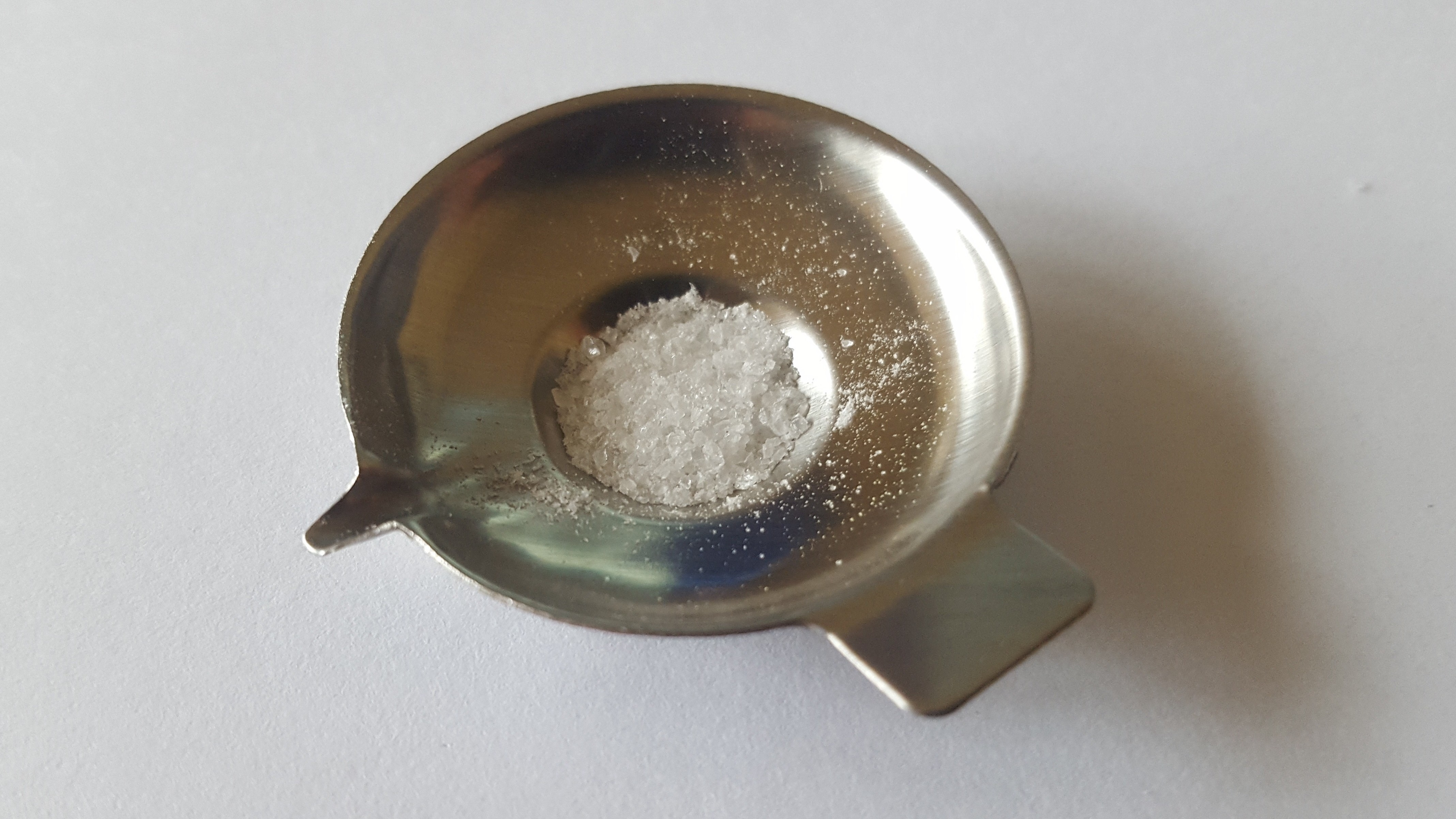
MDA as prepared for recreational use.

=== Names ===
When MDA was under development as a potential pharmaceutical drug, it was given the International Nonproprietary Name (INN) of tenamfetamine.

=== Legal status ===
==== Australia ====
MDA is schedule 9 prohibited substance under the Poisons Standards. A schedule 9 substance is listed as a "Substances which may be abused or misused, the manufacture, possession, sale or use of which should be prohibited by law except when required for medical or scientific research, or for analytical, teaching or training purposes with approval of Commonwealth and/or State or Territory Health Authorities."

==== Canada ====
MDA is a Schedule I controlled substance in Canada.

==== European Union ====
MDA is individually classified by countries in the European Union, but generally the countries follow the Convention on Psychotropic Substances.

==== United States ====
MDA is a Schedule I controlled substance in the United States.

== Research ==
MDA has been studied in entactogen-assisted psychotherapy.

== See also ==
- Substituted methylenedioxyphenethylamine
- Substituted amphetamine
- MDMA
