= 5-APB =

Entactogen

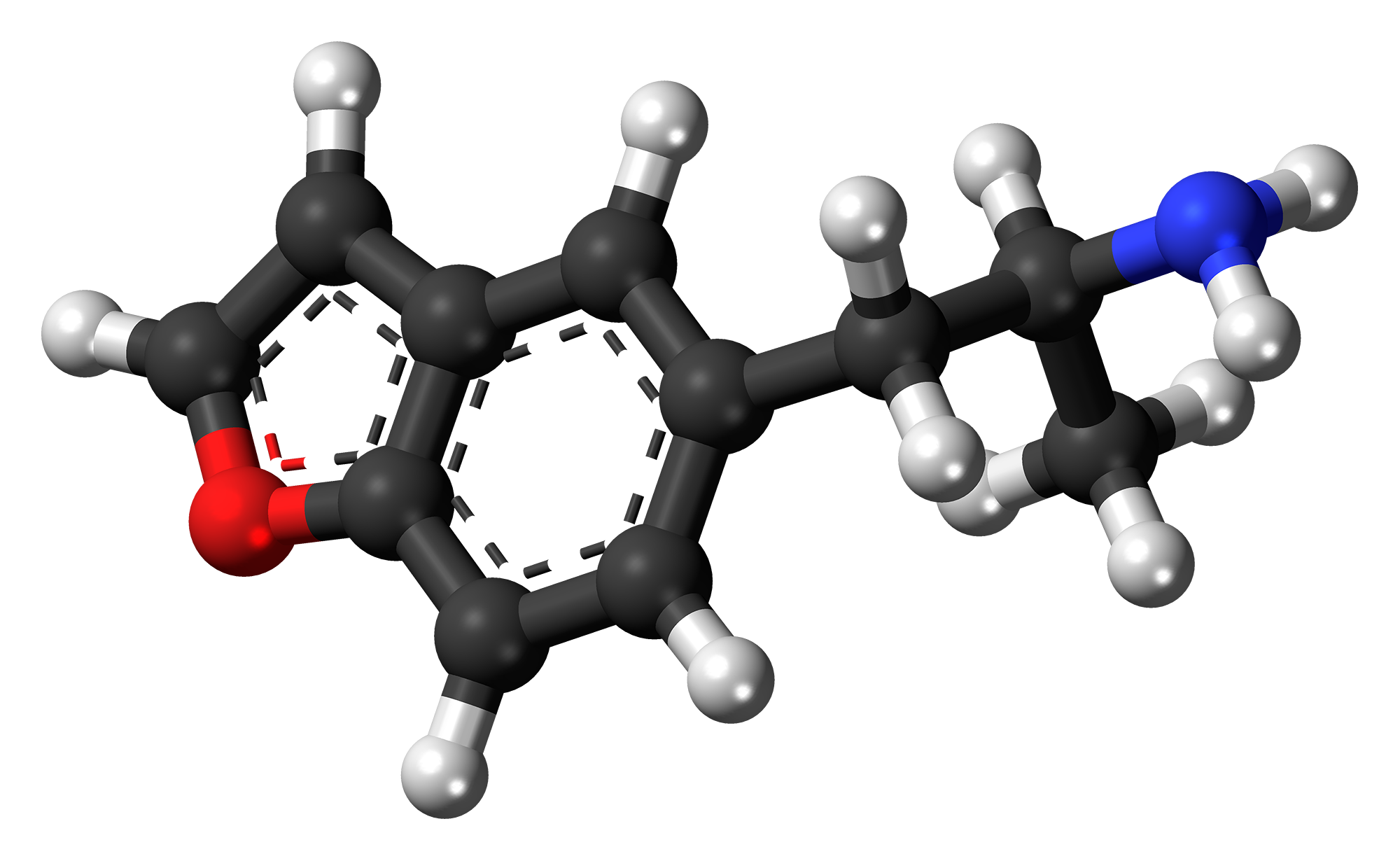

Clinical data
- Other names: 5-(2-Aminopropyl)benzofuran; 1-Benzofuran-5-ylpropan-2-amine
- Routes of administration: Oral
- Drug class: Serotonin–norepinephrine–dopamine releasing agent; Serotonin 5-HT_{2} receptor agonist; Entactogen; Stimulant; Psychedelic
- ATC code: None

Legal status
- Legal status: AU: S9 (Prohibited substance); BR: Class F2 (Prohibited psychotropics); DE: Anlage II (Authorized trade only, not prescriptible); UK: Class B; UN: Unscheduled.

Pharmacokinetic data
- Duration of action: 3–8 hours

Identifiers
- IUPAC name: 1-(1-benzofuran-5-yl)propan-2-amine
- CAS Number: 286834-81-9
- PubChem CID: 9837232
- ChemSpider: 8012953
- UNII: 2M3825704H
- CompTox Dashboard (EPA): DTXSID101010106

Chemical and physical data
- Formula: C_{11}H_{13}NO
- Molar mass: 175.231 g·mol^{−1}
- 3D model (JSmol): Interactive image
- SMILES: CC(N)CC1=CC(C=CO2)=C2C=C1
- InChI: InChI=1S/C11H13NO/c1-8(12)6-9-2-3-11-10(7-9)4-5-13-11/h2-5,7-8H,6,12H2,1H3; Key:VKUMKUZDZWHMQU-UHFFFAOYSA-N

5-APB, also known as 5-(2-aminopropyl)benzofuran, is an entactogen of the phenethylamine, amphetamine, and benzofuran families. 5-APB and related drugs have sometimes been informally called "Benzofury".

5-APB was first described in the scientific literature in 2000 and emerged as a novel designer drug in 2010.

== Use and effects ==
Users describe the effects of 5-APB as including euphoria among others. Largely, its effects reported were similar to those of the drug MDMA but not as strong. The drug has been reported to produce visual disturbances and is said to have mild psychedelic effects.

== Adverse effects ==
A death caused by 5-APB as a result of hyponatremia has been reported. Other deaths have also been reported. Use of 5-APB has been associated with death in combination with other drugs and solely as the result of 5-APB.

== Pharmacology ==
=== Pharmacodynamics ===
5-APB acts as a serotonin–norepinephrine–dopamine releasing agent (SNDRA), with EC_{50} values for monoamine release of 19 nM for serotonin, 21 nM for norepinephrine, and 31 nM for dopamine in rat brain synaptosomes. It is also a serotonin–norepinephrine–dopamine reuptake inhibitor (SNDRI).

5-APB is a potent agonist of the serotonin 5-HT_{2A} and 5-HT_{2B} receptors. Its EC_{50} (E_{max}) values were 6,300 nM (54%) at the serotonin 5-HT_{2A} receptor and 280 nM (61–92%) at the serotonin 5-HT_{2B} receptor. It also shows affinity for the serotonin 5-HT_{2C} receptor (K_{i} = 880 nM) and the serotonin 5-HT_{1A} receptor (K_{i} = 3,300 nM). It has been reported to act as an agonist of the serotonin 5-HT_{2C} receptor similarly to the serotonin 5-HT_{2A} and 5-HT_{2B} receptors. The drug's potent agonism of the serotonin 5-HT_{2B} receptor makes it likely that 5-APB would be cardiotoxic with long-term use, as seen with other serotonin 5-HT_{2B} receptor agonists such as fenfluramine and MDMA.

5-APB also shows high affinity for the mouse and rat trace amine-associated receptor 1 (TAAR1).

In animal studies, 5-APB produces robust hyperlocomotion, robust conditioned place preference (CPP) but limited self-administration, fully substitutes for MDMA in drug discrimination tests, and partially substitutes for DOM, cocaine, and methamphetamine in drug discrimination tests.

== Chemistry ==
5-APB, also known as 5-(2-aminopropyl)benzofuran, is a phenethylamine, amphetamine, and benzofuran and an analogue of 3,4-methylenedioxyamphetamine (MDA).

=== Properties ===
5-APB is commonly found as the succinate and hydrochloride salt. The hydrochloride salt is 10% more potent by mass and doses should be adjusted accordingly.

=== Synthesis ===
The chemical synthesis of 5-APB has been described.

=== Detection ===
A forensic standard of 5-APB is available, and the compound has been posted on the Forendex website of potential drugs of abuse. The US Department of Justice and DEA have also conducted studies concerning the detection of 5-APB.

=== Analogues ===
Analogues of 5-APB include MDA, 5-APDB, 5-MAPB, 6-APB, 5-APBT, SDA (3T-MDA), and 5-API, among others.

== History ==
5-APB, along with 6-APB, was first described in the scientific literature by Karin Briner and colleagues at Eli Lilly and Company in a patent in 2000. They were specifically studied as serotonin 5-HT_{2C} receptor agonists for potential medical applications at this time. The description of 5-APB and 6-APB in the literature had followed the earlier work on 5-APDB and 6-APDB as serotonin releasing agents and entactogens by David E. Nichols and colleagues at Purdue University in 1993. 5-APB, along with 6-APB, emerged as a novel designer drug in 2010. 5-APB and 6-APB are often confused with 5-APDB and 6-APDB.

== Society and culture ==
=== Legal status ===
==== Canada ====
5-APB may be a controlled substance in Canada under phenethylamine blanket-ban language.

==== United Kingdom ====
On March 5, 2014 the UK Home Office announced that 5-APB would be made a class B drug on 10 June 2014 alongside every other benzofuran entactogen and many structurally related drugs.

==== United States ====
5-APB is not an explicitly controlled substance in the United States. However, it could be considered a controlled substance under the Federal Analogue Act if intended for human consumption.

== See also ==
- Substituted benzofuran
