= 6-APB =

Psychoactive drug

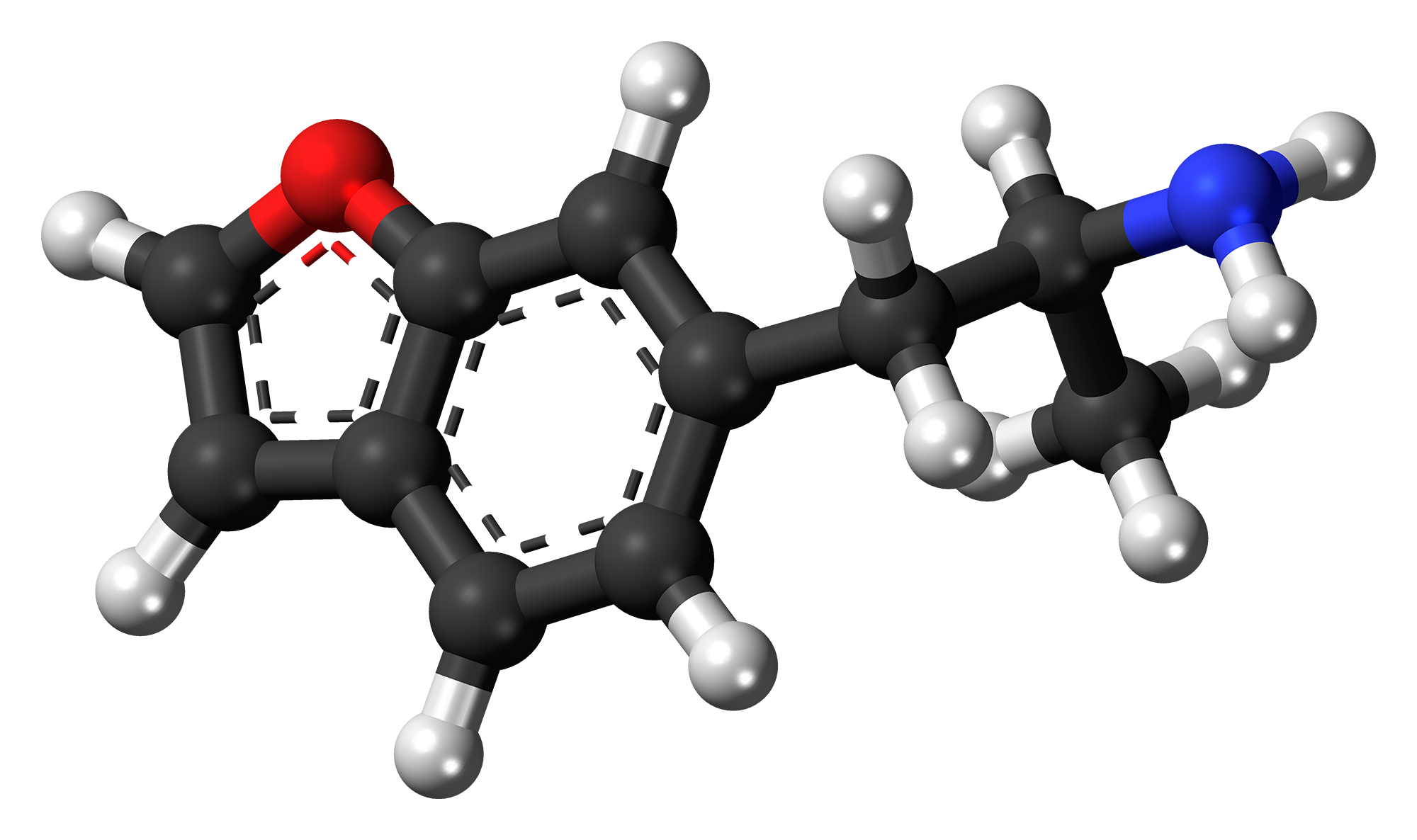

Clinical data
- Other names: 6-(2-Aminopropyl)benzofuran
- Routes of administration: Oral
- Drug class: Serotonin–norepinephrine–dopamine releasing agent; Serotonin 5-HT_{2} receptor agonist; Entactogen; Stimulant; Psychedelic
- ATC code: None

Legal status
- Legal status: AU: S9 (Prohibited substance); CA: Schedule III; DE: Anlage II (Authorized trade only, not prescriptible); UK: Class B; UN: Unscheduled

Pharmacokinetic data
- Onset of action: 30–60 minutes
- Duration of action: 6–9 hours

Identifiers
- IUPAC name: 1-(1-benzofuran-6-yl)propan-2-amine
- CAS Number: 286834-85-3 286834-84-2 (HCl)
- PubChem CID: 9794343
- ChemSpider: 7970110
- UNII: 285VE60914
- CompTox Dashboard (EPA): DTXSID401010105

Chemical and physical data
- Formula: C_{11}H_{13}NO
- Molar mass: 175.231 g·mol^{−1}
- 3D model (JSmol): Interactive image
- SMILES: NC(C)CC1=CC(OC=C2)=C2C=C1
- InChI: InChI=1S/C11H13NO/c1-8(12)6-9-2-3-10-4-5-13-11(10)7-9/h2-5,7-8H,6,12H2,1H3; Key:FQDAMYLMQQKPRX-UHFFFAOYSA-N

6-APB, also known as 6-(2-aminopropyl)benzofuran, is an entactogen of the phenethylamine, amphetamine, and benzofuran families. 6-APB and related drugs are sometimes informally called "Benzofury" in media reports. It is similar in structure to MDA, but differs in that the 3,4-methylenedioxyphenyl ring system has been replaced with a benzofuran ring. 6-APB is also the unsaturated benzofuran derivative of 6-APDB. It may appear as a tan or brown grainy powder.

While the drug never became particularly popular, it briefly entered the rave and underground clubbing scene in the UK before its sale and import were banned. It falls under the category of research chemicals, sometimes called "legal highs" if uncontrolled. Because 6-APB and other substituted benzofurans have not been explicitly outlawed in some countries, they are often technically legal, contributing to its popularity.

6-APB was first described in the scientific literature in 2000 and emerged as a novel designer drug in 2010.

== Use and effects ==
6-APB is reported to produce entactogenic, stimulant, and mild psychedelic effects in humans.

== Side effects ==
Acute psychosis has been associated with recreational use of 6-APB in combination with the synthetic cannabinoid JWH-122.

== Pharmacology ==
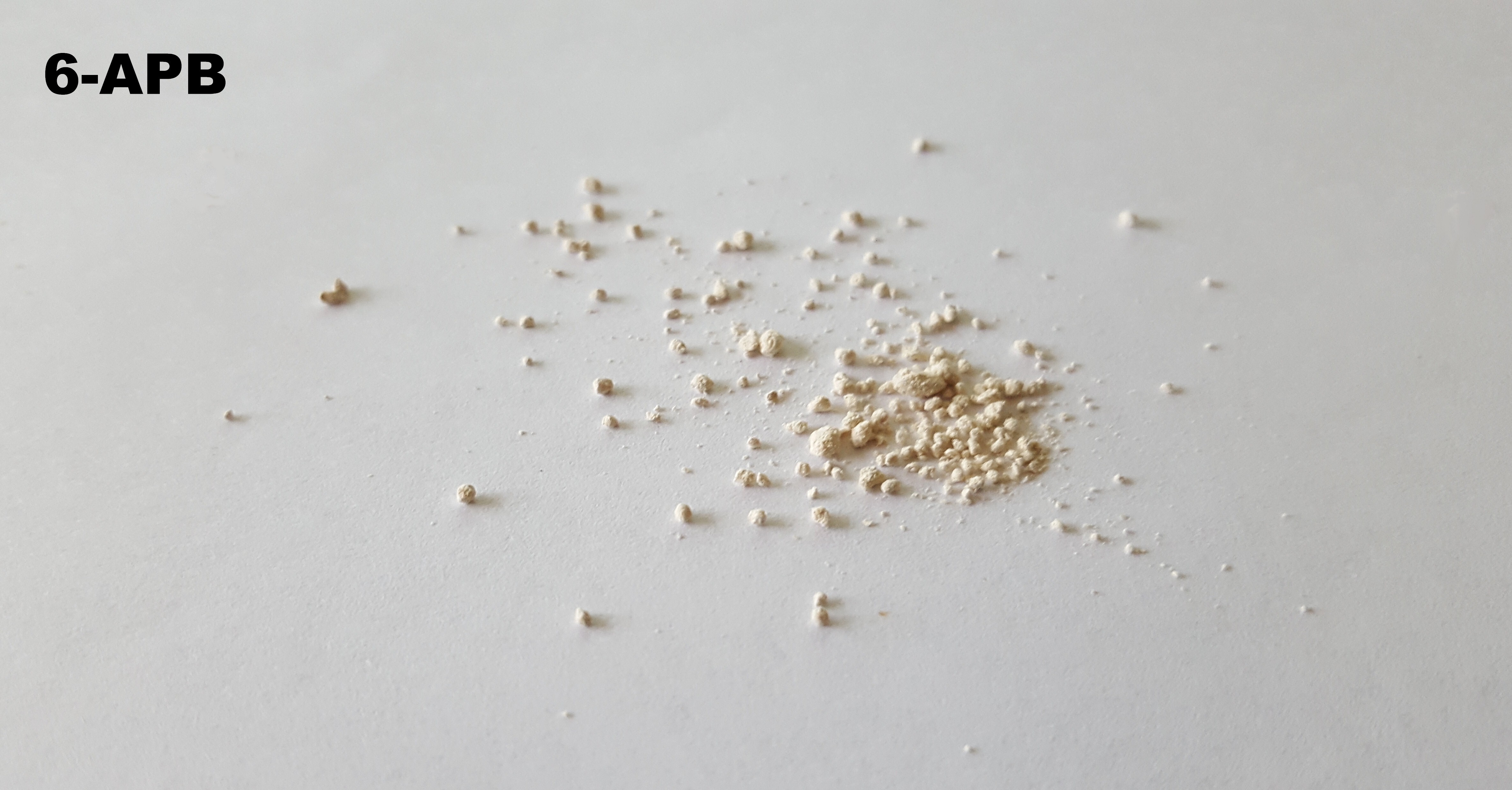
Small clumps of 6-APB powder

=== Pharmacodynamics ===
6-APB acts as a serotonin–norepinephrine–dopamine releasing agent (SNDRA), with EC_{50} values for monoamine release of 36 nM for serotonin, 14 nM for norepinephrine, and 10 nM for dopamine in rat brain synaptosomes. Simultaneously, 6-APB is a serotonin–norepinephrine–dopamine reuptake inhibitor (SNDRI), with affinities (K_{i}) of 117 nM for the norepinephrine transporter (NET), 150 nM for the dopamine transporter (DAT), and 2,698 nM for the serotonin transporter (SERT) as well as IC_{50} values for monoamine reuptake inhibition of 930 nM for serotonin, 190 nM for norepinephrine, and 3,300 nM for dopamine.

In addition to actions at the monoamine transporters, 6-APB is a potent high-efficacy partial agonist or full agonist of the serotonin 5-HT_{2B} receptor (K_{i} = 3.7 nM; EC_{50} = 140 nM; E_{max} = 70%). It has higher affinity for this target than any other site. Moreover, unlike MDMA, 6-APB shows 100-fold selectivity for the serotonin 5-HT_{2B} receptor over the serotonin 5-HT_{2A} and 5-HT_{2C} receptors in terms of affinity. It is notably both more potent and more selective as an agonist of the serotonin 5-HT_{2B} receptor than the reference serotonin 5-HT_{2B} receptor agonist, BW-723C86, which is commonly used for research into the serotonin 5-HT_{2B} receptor. Although much more potent at the serotonin 5-HT_{2B} receptor, 6-APB is also a partial agonist of the serotonin 5-HT_{2A} receptor (EC_{50} = 5,900 nM; E_{max} = 43%) and shows affinity for the serotonin 5-HT_{2C} receptor (K_{i} = 270 nM) and the serotonin 5-HT_{1A} receptor (K_{i} = 1,500 nM). It has been reported to act as an agonist of the serotonin 5-HT_{2C} receptor similarly to the serotonin 5-HT_{2A} and 5-HT_{2B} receptors.

Besides the serotonin 5-HT_{2} receptors, 6-APB has been found to bind with high affinity to the α_{2C}-adrenergic receptor (K_{i} = 45 nM), although the significance of this action in humans is unknown. 6-APB showed little other affinity at a wide selection of other sites, with some exceptions like the rodent trace amine-associated receptor 1 (TAAR1).

The potent agonism of the serotonin 5-HT_{2B} receptor makes it likely that 6-APB would be cardiotoxic with chronic or long-term use, as seen with other serotonin 5-HT_{2B} receptor agonists such as the withdrawn serotonergic anorectic fenfluramine.

=== Pharmacokinetics ===
The pharmacokinetics of 6-APB have not been studied, however, some information can be extracted from user reports. These suggest a slow onset of 40 to 120 minutes. The drugs peak effects last 7 hours, followed by a comedown phase of approximately 2 hours, and after effects for up to 24 hours.

==== Metabolism ====
Although limited literature is available, there is some data on metabolism of 6-APB in rats. Its Phase I metabolism involves hydroxylation of the furan ring, then cleavage of the ring, followed by a reduction of the unsaturated aldehyde from the previous step. The resulting aldehyde may then take two paths. It is either oxidized to a carboxylic acid or reduced to an alcohol, and then hydroxylated. Phase II metabolism consists of glucuronidation. The most prevalent metabolites in rats were 3-carboxymethyl-4-hydroxyamphetamine and 4-carboxymethyl-3-hydroxyamphetamine.

== Chemistry ==
6-APB, also known as 6-(2-aminopropyl)benzofuran, is a phenethylamine, amphetamine, and benzofuran and an analogue of 3,4-methylenedioxyamphetamine (MDA).

=== Synthesis ===
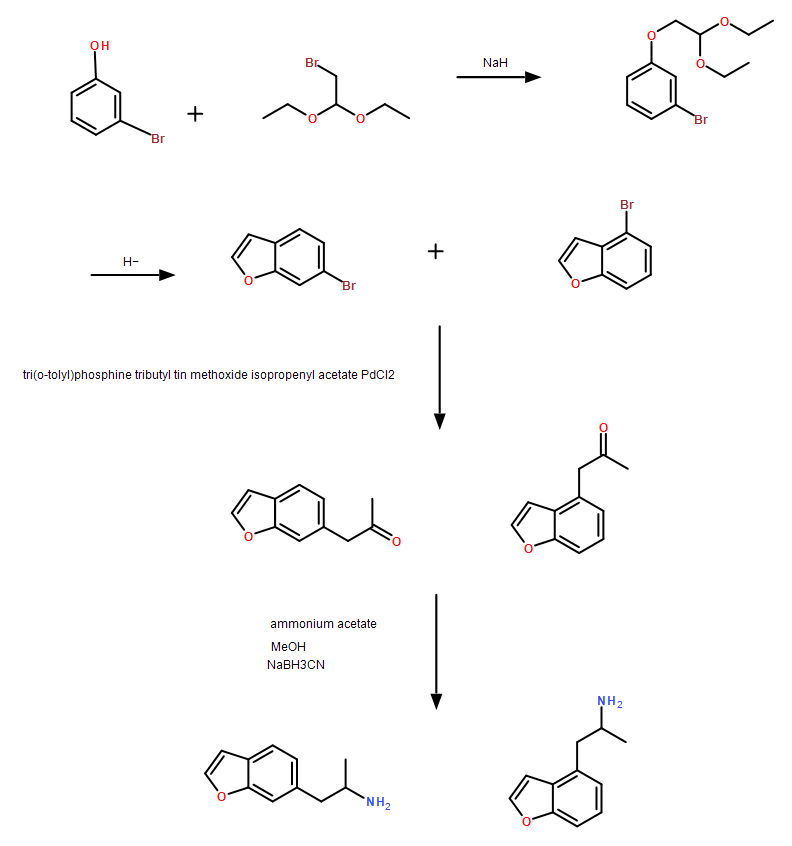
Synthesis of 6-APB and its structural isomer 4-APB

The chemical synthesis of 6-APB has been described. The synthesis by Briner and colleagues entailed refluxing 3-bromophenol with bromoacetaldehyde diethylacetal and sodium hydride to give the diethyl acetal, which then was heated with polyphosphoric acid to give a mixture of bromobenzofuran structural isomers: 4-bromo-1-benzofuran and 6-bromo-1-benzofuran. The isomers were separated by silica gel column chromatography, then converted to their respective propanone derivatives, and then reductively aminated to give 6-APB and 4-APB, both of which were converted to their HCl ion pairs for further examination.

=== Reagent results ===
6-APB and its structural isomer 5-APB have been tested with a series of agents including: Marquis, Liebermann, Mecke, and Froehde reagents. Exposing compounds to the reagents gives a colour change which is indicative of the compound under test.

Compound	Marquis	Mecke	Mandelin	Liebermann	Froehde	Gallic	Ehrlich	Hofmann	Simon's	Folin
6-APB	Purple	Purple to black	Purple to black	Black	Purple	Brown	Orange	Light orange	No reaction	Light orange
6-APB succinate	Purple	Purple to black	Purple to black	Black	Purple	Brown	Faint orange	No reaction	No reaction	Light orange

6-APB succinate is reported to be practically insoluble in CHCl_{3} as well as very minimally soluble in cold water. A batch seized by the DEA contained a 2:1 ratio of succinate to 6-APB.

=== Analogues ===
Analogues of 6-APB include MDA, 6-APDB, 6-MAPB, 5-APB, 6-APBT, and 6-API, among others.

== History ==
6-APB, along with 5-APB, was first described in the scientific literature by Karin Briner and colleagues at Eli Lilly and Company in a patent in 2000. They were specifically studied as serotonin 5-HT_{2C} receptor agonists for potential medical applications at this time. The description of 5-APB and 6-APB in the literature had followed the earlier work on 5-APDB and 6-APDB as serotonin releasing agents and entactogens by David E. Nichols and colleagues at Purdue University in 1993. 6-APB, along with 5-APB, emerged as a novel designer drug in 2010. 5-APB and 6-APB are often confused with 5-APDB and 6-APDB.

== Society and culture ==
=== Legal status ===
==== Canada ====
In 1999, amphetamines were changed from Schedule III to Schedule I as a result of the Safe Streets Act. Some have speculated that 6-APB's structure qualifies it as a Schedule I drug as an analog of MDA.

In 2014, a study funded by the Canadian Institutes of Health Research noted that 6-APB "may or may not be legal in Canada depending on how one interprets the current Act" and that it could be purchased for academic purposes without an exemption from Health Canada. The study also noted how, unlike the MDMA it often serves as a replacement for in countries like the US, 6-APB's benzofuran structure does not make it a direct analogue of amphetamine despite similarities in effects.

==== China ====
6-APB has been a controlled substance in China since 1 July 2024

==== Finland ====
6-APB is scheduled in government decree on narcotic substances, preparations and plants and hence is illegal.

==== France ====
6-APB is illegal in France.

==== Germany ====
6-APB is illegal in Germany since the 17th of July, 2013, when it was added to Anlage II of the Betäubungsmittelgesetz.

==== Italy ====
6-APB is illegal in Italy.

==== Luxembourg ====
In Luxembourg, 6-APB is not cited in the list of prohibited substances. Therefore, it is still a legal substance.

==== Netherlands ====
6-APB, as well as multiple substances based on the phenylethamine structure, like most cathinones and amphetamines, are banned under the Opium Law since July 1st, 2025, following an amendment to deal with New Psychoactive Substances (NPS) in the Netherlands. Since this is a structural ban instead of a direct one, later substances that differ slightly but use the same skeleton will also be preemptively banned.

==== New Zealand and Australia ====
Certain countries contain a "substantially similar" catch-all clause in their drug law, such as New Zealand and Australia. This includes 6-APB as it is similar in chemical structure to the class A drug MDA, meaning 6-APB may be viewed as a controlled substance analogue in these jurisdictions.

==== Sweden ====
In Sweden, as of 27 December 2009 6-APB is classified as "health hazard" under the act Lagen om förbud mot vissa hälsofarliga varor (translated Act on the Prohibition of Certain Goods Dangerous to Health).

It is also classified as a narcotic substance since 2020.

==== United Kingdom ====
On June 10, 2013 6-APB and a number of analogues were classified as Temporary Class Drugs in the UK following an ACMD recommendation. This means that sale and import of the named substances are criminal offences and are treated as for class B drugs. On November 28, 2013 the ACMD recommended that 6-APB and related benzofurans should become Class B, Schedule 1 substances. On March 5, 2014 the UK Home Office announced that 6-APB would be made a class B drug on 10 June 2014 alongside every other benzofuran entactogen and many structurally related drugs.

==== United States ====
6-APB is not an explicitly controlled substance in the United States. However, it could be considered a controlled substance under the Federal Analogue Act if intended for human consumption.

== See also ==
- Substituted benzofuran
