= Serotonin–norepinephrine–dopamine releasing agent =

Type of drug

A serotonin–norepinephrine–dopamine releasing agent (SNDRA), also known as a triple releasing agent (TRA), is a type of drug which induces the release of serotonin, norepinephrine/epinephrine, and dopamine in the brain and body. SNDRAs may produce euphoriant, decongestant, aphrodisiacal, anorectic, nootropic, entactogenic, and/or psychostimulant effects. Drugs of this class tend to have high abuse liability, especially when taken in supratherapeutic quantities.

A closely related type of drug is a serotonin–norepinephrine–dopamine reuptake inhibitor (SNDRI).

== Examples of SNDRAs ==
Examples of SNDRAs include specific amphetamines such as MDMA, MDA, 4-methylamphetamine, methamphetamine (in high doses), certain substituted benzofurans such as 5-APB and 6-APB, naphthylisopropylamine; cathinones such as mephedrone and methylone; tryptamines such as αMT and αET; along with agents of other chemical classes such as 4,4'-DMAR, and 5-IAI. αET and αMT are of special notability among SNDRAs in that those tryptamines were once used as pharmaceutical drugs, specifically as antidepressants, but were withdrawn shortly after introduction in the 1960s due to problems with toxicity and recreational use. Such tryptamines were originally thought to act as monoamine oxidase inhibitors (MAOIs) before the signature monoamine-releasing actions were elucidated. Many years after being withdrawn, αET was also determined to produce serotonergic neurotoxicity, similarly to MDMA and various other SNDRAs; the same is very likely true for αMT as well, although it has not specifically been assessed.

== See also ==
- Monoamine releasing agent
- Norepinephrine–dopamine releasing agent
- Serotonin–dopamine releasing agent
- Serotonin–norepinephrine releasing agent
