= Serotonin–dopamine releasing agent =

Drug that releases serotonin and dopamine in the brain

BK-NM-AMT, a well-balanced and selective SDRA.

A serotonin–dopamine releasing agent (SDRA) is a type of drug which induces the release of serotonin and dopamine in the body and/or brain.

SDRAs are rare, as it has proven extremely difficult to dissociate dopamine and norepinephrine release. However, in 2014, the first selective SDRAs, a series of substituted tryptamines, albeit also acting as serotonin receptor agonists, were described.

A closely related type of drug is a serotonin–dopamine reuptake inhibitor (SDRI), for instance UWA-101 (α-cyclopropyl-MDMA).

== Examples of SDRAs ==
A number of tryptamine derivatives, specifically α-alkyltryptamines, have been found to act as SDRAs. One such agent is 5-chloro-αMT (PAL-542), which has been reported as having about 64-fold selectivity for dopamine release over norepinephrine release and about 3-fold selectivity for serotonin release over dopamine release, making it a highly selective and well-balanced SDRA. Another agent is 5-fluoro-αET (PAL-545), which has about 35-fold selectivity for dopamine release over norepinephrine release and about 4-fold selectivity for serotonin release over dopamine release. Though selective for inducing the release of serotonin and dopamine over norepinephrine, these agents are not selective monoamine releasers; they have all also been found to be potent agonists of the 5-HT_{2A} receptor, and are likely to act as agonists of other serotonin receptors as well. In any case, they are the only known releaser scaffold that consistently release dopamine more potently than norepinephrine.

Another tryptamine SDRA is the β-ketotryptamine BK-NM-AMT (α,N-dimethyl-β-ketotryptamine). It is the N-methyl and β-keto analogue of αMT. The drug is a cathinone-like tryptamine and can be thought of as the tryptamine analogue of methcathinone. Its EC_{50} values for monoamine release are 41.3 nM for serotonin and 92.8 nM for dopamine, whereas it only induced 55% release of norepinephrine at a concentration of 10 μM. BK-NM-AMT has been described in a patent filed by Matthew Baggott, assigned to Tactogen, and published in October 2024. 5-Halogenated derivatives of this drug, including BK-5F-NM-AMT, BK-5Cl-NM-AMT, and BK-5Br-NM-AMT, have also been described and patented. Like BK-NM-AMT, they induce serotonin and dopamine release. In contrast to many other tryptamines, these compounds are inactive as agonists of serotonin receptors including the 5-HT_{1}, 5-HT_{2}, and 5-HT_{3} receptors. In addition, unlike other α-alkyltryptamines like αMT, they are inactive as monoamine oxidase inhibitors (MAOIs).

3-Methoxymethcathinone (3-MeOMC) is a rare possible example of a phenethylamine (or rather cathinone) SDRA. Its EC_{50} values for monoamine release are 129 nM for dopamine and 306 nM for serotonin, whereas it only induced 68% release of norepinephrine at 10 μM. However, in another publication, its EC_{50} for induction of norepinephrine release was reported and was 111 nM.

N,N-Dimethyl-4-methylthioamphetamine (N,N-dimethyl-4-MTA; 4-MTDMA, DMMTA) has been described as a releasing agent of serotonin and dopamine that lacks induction of aortic contraction in vitro and hence may lack concomitant norepinephrine release. However, EC_{50} values for monoamine release were not reported. 4-MTDMA is actually a partial releaser of serotonin rather than a full releaser, with a maximal efficacy for induction of serotonin release of either 25% or 50% relative to MDMA or para-chloroamphetamine (PCA) (which are 100% or full releasers). Although 4-MTDMA might not induce norepinephrine release, it is a monoamine oxidase A (MAO-A) inhibitor, with an IC_{50} of 2,100 nM.

=== Activity profiles ===
Activity profiles of SDRAs and related compounds (EC_{50}, nM)
Compound	5-HT	NE	DA	Type	Class	Ref
Tryptamine	32.6	716	164	SDRA	Tryptamine	
α-Methyltryptamine (αMT)	21.7–68	79–112	78.6–180	SNDRA	Tryptamine	
α-Ethyltryptamine (αET)	23.2	640	232	SDRA	Tryptamine	
(–)-αET	54.9	3670^{a}	654	SRA	Tryptamine	
(+)-αET	34.7	592^{a}	57.6	SDRA	Tryptamine	
5-Fluoro-αMT	19	126	32	SNDRA	Tryptamine	
5-Chloro-αMT	16	3434	54	SDRA	Tryptamine	
5-Fluoro-αET	36.6	5334	150	SDRA	Tryptamine	
5-MeO-αMT	460	8900	1500	SNDRA	Tryptamine	
BK-NM-AMT	41.3	ND (55% at 10 μM)	92.8	SDRA	Tryptamine	
BK-5F-NM-AMT	190	ND	620	ND	Tryptamine	
BK-5Cl-NM-AMT	200	ND	865	ND	Tryptamine	
BK-5Br-NM-AMT	295	ND	2100	ND	Tryptamine	
3-Methoxymethcathinone (3-MeOMC)	306	111 (68% at 10 μM)	129	SDRA/SNDRA	Cathinone	
Notes: The smaller the value, the more strongly the substance releases the neurotransmitter. See also Monoamine releasing agent § Activity profiles for a larger table with more compounds. Footnotes: ^{a} = αET, (–)-αET, and (+)-αET were norepinephrine partial releasers with E_{max} values of 78%, 75%, and 71%, respectively.

== See also ==
- Monoamine releasing agent
- Serotonin releasing agent
- Dopamine releasing agent
- Serotonin–norepinephrine–dopamine releasing agent
