= BK-NM-AMT =

Monoamine releaser and entactogen

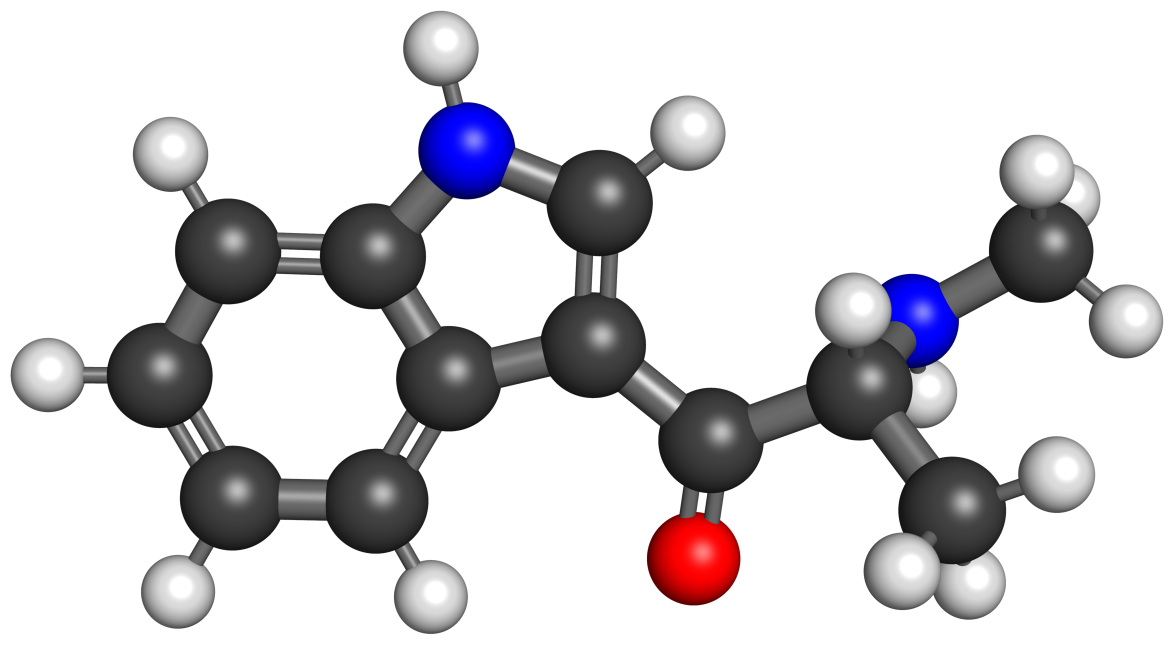

Clinical data
- Other names: βk-NM-αMT; β-Keto-N-methyl-αMT; β-Keto-N-methyl-AMT; α,N-dimethyl-β-ketotryptamine; 3-Indoylmethcathinone; β-Oxo-α-methyl-NMT
- Drug class: Serotonin–dopamine releasing agent; Entactogen

Identifiers
- IUPAC name: 1-(1H-indol-3-yl)-2-(methylamino)propan-1-one
- CAS Number: 22942-93-4
- PubChem CID: 82282492
- ChemSpider: 26703861

Chemical and physical data
- Formula: C_{12}H_{14}N_{2}O
- Molar mass: 202.257 g·mol^{−1}
- 3D model (JSmol): Interactive image
- SMILES: CC(C(=O)C1=CNC2=CC=CC=C21)NC
- InChI: InChI=1S/C12H14N2O/c1-8(13-2)12(15)10-7-14-11-6-4-3-5-9(10)11/h3-8,13-14H,1-2H3; Key:NBPRBKHRAWWHFV-UHFFFAOYSA-N

BK-NM-AMT, or βk-NM-αMT, also known as β-keto-N-methyl-αMT or α,N-dimethyl-β-ketotryptamine, as well as 3-indoylmethcathinone, is a serotonin–dopamine releasing agent (SDRA) and putative entactogen of the tryptamine, α-alkyltryptamine, and β-ketotryptamine families.

== Pharmacology ==
=== Pharmacodynamics ===
BK-NM-AMT acts as a serotonin–dopamine releasing agent (SDRA). The EC_{50} values of BK-NM-AMT for monoamine release are 41.3 nM for serotonin and 92.8 nM for dopamine in rat brain synaptosomes, whereas it only induced 55% release of norepinephrine at a concentration of 10 μM. Along with certain other tryptamines, such as α-ethyltryptamine (αET), 5-chloro-αMT and 5-fluoro-αET, it is one of the few SDRAs known.

Monoamine release of BK-NM-AMT and related compounds (EC_{50}, nM)
Compound	5-HT	NE	DA	Type	Ref
Tryptamine	32.6	716	164	SDRA	
α-Methyltryptamine (αMT)	21.7–68	79–112	78.6–180	SNDRA	
5-Fluoro-αMT	19	126	32	SNDRA	
5-Chloro-αMT	16	3434	54	SDRA	
BK-NM-AMT	41.3	ND (55% at 10 μM)	92.8	SDRA	
BK-5F-NM-AMT	190	ND	620	ND	
BK-5Cl-NM-AMT	200	ND	865	ND	
BK-5Br-NM-AMT	295	ND	2100	ND	
Notes: The smaller the value, the more strongly the substance releases the neurotransmitter. The assays were done in rat brain synaptosomes and human potencies may be different. See also Monoamine releasing agent § Activity profiles for a larger table with more compounds.

== Chemistry ==
BK-NM-AMT, also known as β-keto-N-methyl-α-methyltryptamine, is the N-methyl and β-keto derivative of α-methyltryptamine (αMT). It is a cathinone-like tryptamine and can be thought of as the tryptamine or indole analogue of the phenethylamine methcathinone (β-keto-N-methylamphetamine).

=== Analogues ===
Analogues of BK-NM-AMT include α-methyltryptamine (AMT) and α,N-dimethyltryptamine (α,N-DMT; NM-AMT), among others.

=== Derivatives ===
Several 5-halogenated derivatives of BK-NM-AMT have also been described. These include BK-5F-NM-AMT, BK-5Cl-NM-AMT, and BK-5Br-NM-AMT. Like BK-NM-AMT, they induce serotonin and dopamine release. In contrast to many other tryptamines however, these novel β-keto-substituted tryptamine derivatives are inactive as agonists of serotonin receptors including the 5-HT_{1}, 5-HT_{2}, and 5-HT_{3} receptors. In addition, unlike other α-alkyltryptamines like αMT, these compounds are inactive as monoamine oxidase inhibitors (MAOIs).

== History ==
BK-NM-AMT and its 5-halogenated analogues were patented by Matthew Baggott and Tactogen in late 2024.

== See also ==
- Substituted α-alkyltryptamine
- Substituted β-ketotryptamine
- 1Z2MAP1O and 1ZP2MA
- Serotonin–dopamine releasing agent § Examples of SDRAs
