= C11H14N2 =

The molecular formula C_{11}H_{14}N_{2} (molar mass: 174.24 g/mol, exact mass: 174.115698) may refer to:

- 4-(2-Aminopropyl)indole
- 5-(2-Aminopropyl)indole
- 6-(2-Aminopropyl)indole
- Gramine
- α-Methylisotryptamine
- N-(2-Cyanoethyl)phenethylamine
- Methyltryptamines
  - 1-Methyltryptamine
  - 2-Methyltryptamine
  - 5-Methyltryptamine
  - α-Methyltryptamine
  - N-Methyltryptamine
