= BK-5F-NM-AMT =

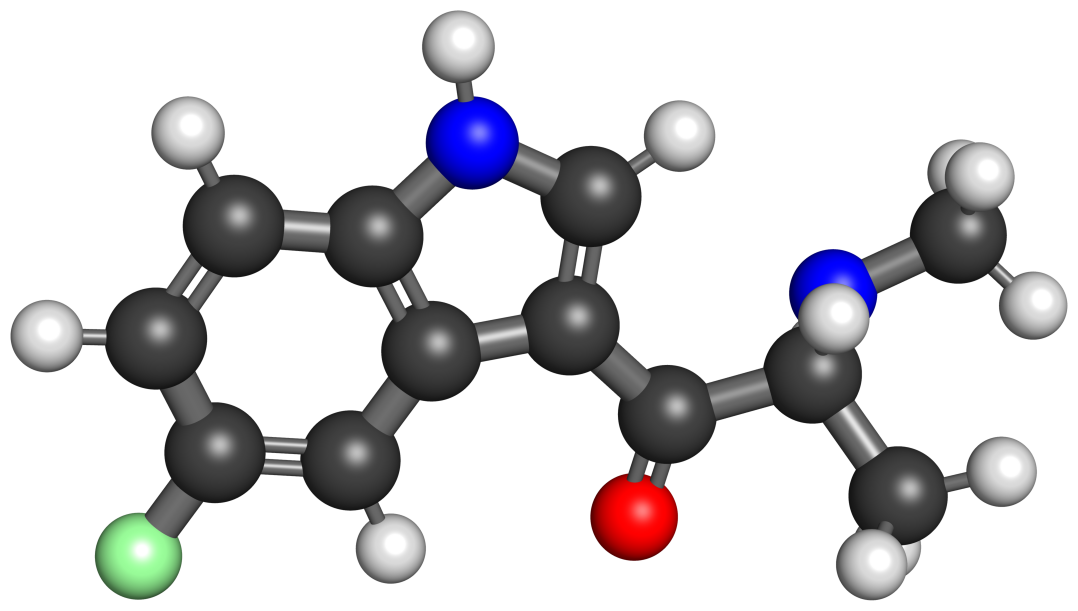

Clinical data
- Other names: βk-5F-NM-αMT; β-Keto-5-fluoro-N-methyl-αMT; β-Keto-5-fluoro-N-methyl-AMT; α,N-Dimethyl-5-fluoro-β-ketotryptamine; β-Oxo-5-fluoro-α-methyl-NMT
- Drug class: Monoamine releasing agent

Identifiers
- IUPAC name: 1-(5-fluoro-1H-indol-3-yl)-2-(methylamino)propan-1-one
- PubChem CID: 162765676

Chemical and physical data
- Formula: C_{12}H_{13}FN_{2}O
- Molar mass: 220.247 g·mol^{−1}
- 3D model (JSmol): Interactive image
- SMILES: CC(C(=O)C1=CNC2=C1C=C(C=C2)F)NC
- InChI: InChI=1S/C12H13FN2O/c1-7(14-2)12(16)10-6-15-11-4-3-8(13)5-9(10)11/h3-7,14-15H,1-2H3; Key:NONYEOWAEONGSG-UHFFFAOYSA-N

BK-5F-NM-AMT, or βk-5F-NM-αMT, also known as β-keto-5-fluoro-N-methyl-αMT or α,N-dimethyl-5-fluoro-β-ketotryptamine, is a monoamine releasing agent of the tryptamine, α-alkyltryptamine, and β-ketotryptamine families.

It is known to induce the release of serotonin and dopamine, with respective EC_{50} values of 190 nM and 620 nM in rat brain synaptosomes, whereas norepinephrine release was not reported. In contrast to many other tryptamines, the drug is inactive as an agonist of serotonin receptors including the 5-HT_{1}, 5-HT_{2}, and 5-HT_{3} receptors. In addition, unlike other α-alkyltryptamines like α-methyltryptamine (αMT), it is inactive as a monoamine oxidase inhibitor (MAOI).

BK-5F-NM-AMT was first described in the literature by 2023. It was patented by Matthew Baggott and Tactogen as a potential novel entactogen. BK-5F-NM-AMT is the 5-fluoro derivative of BK-NM-AMT. Other analogues of the drug include BK-5Cl-NM-AMT and BK-5Br-NM-AMT.

== See also ==
- Substituted α-alkyltryptamine
- Substituted β-ketotryptamine
- 5-Fluoro-AMT
