= 4-HO-αMT =

Chemical compound

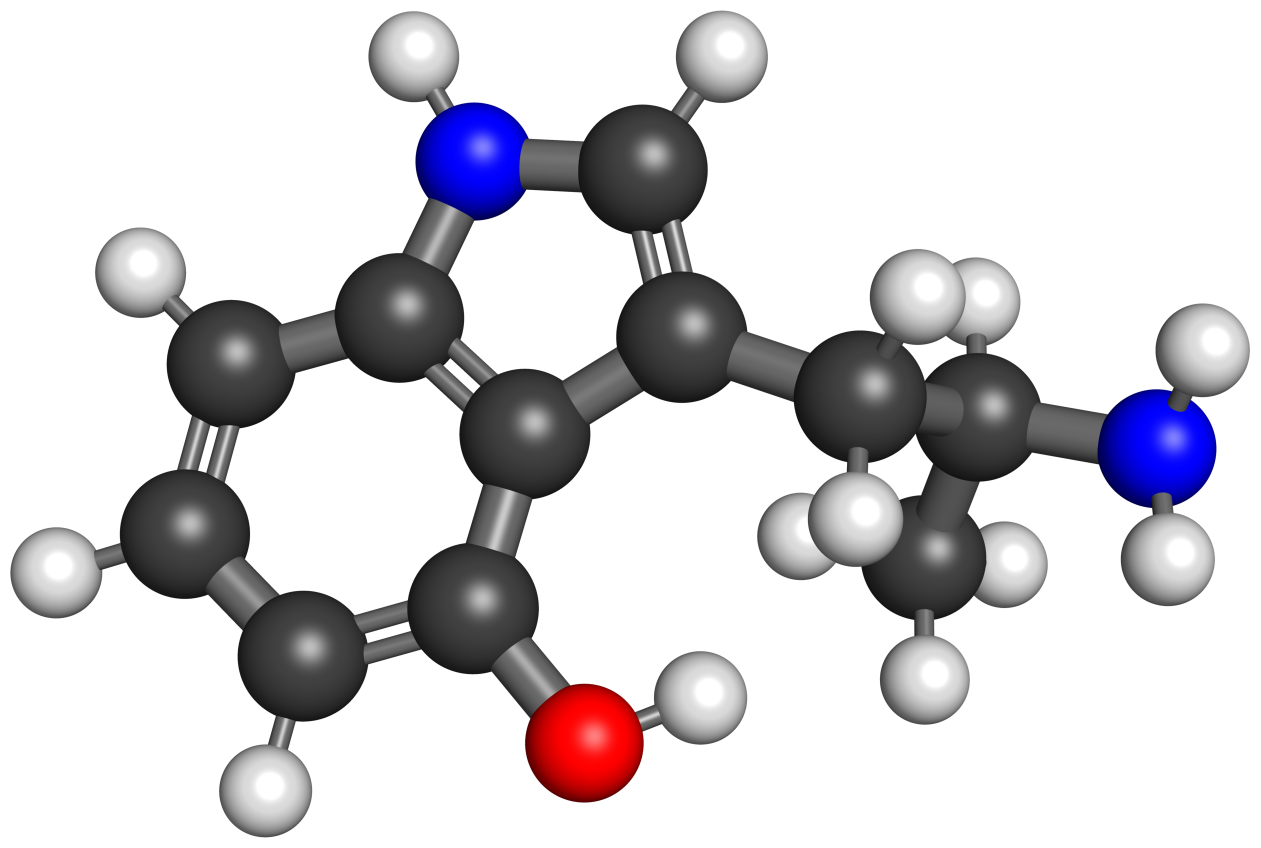

Clinical data
- Other names: 4-HO-αMT; 4-HO-AMT; MP-14
- Routes of administration: Oral
- Drug class: Serotonergic psychedelic; Hallucinogen
- ATC code: None

Legal status
- Legal status: Uncontrolled (but may be covered under the Federal Analogue Act in the United States and under similar bills in other countries)

Identifiers
- IUPAC name: 3-(2-aminopropyl)-1H-indol-4-ol
- CAS Number: 15066-09-8 113997-84-5 (R isomer) 113997-85-6 (S isomer)
- PubChem CID: 14083213
- ChemSpider: 23128298
- UNII: 3RP9EZV7GN
- CompTox Dashboard (EPA): DTXSID501029399

Chemical and physical data
- Formula: C_{11}H_{14}N_{2}O
- Molar mass: 190.246 g·mol^{−1}
- 3D model (JSmol): Interactive image
- Melting point: 125 to 126 °C (257 to 259 °F)
- SMILES: CC(N)CC1=CNC2=CC=CC(O)=C12
- InChI: InChI=1S/C11H14N2O/c1-7(12)5-8-6-13-9-3-2-4-10(14)11(8)9/h2-4,6-7,13-14H,5,12H2,1H3; Key:BYMNOLWNRCZVLJ-UHFFFAOYSA-N

4-HO-αMT (developmental code name MP-14), also known as 4-hydroxy-α-methyltryptamine, is a psychedelic drug of the tryptamine and α-alkyltryptamine families. It is a close structural analogue of α-methyltryptamine (αMT) and produces similar effects to it, but with exacerbated side effects similarly to 5-MeO-αMT. The drug is taken orally.

== Use and effects ==
4-HO-AMT was assessed in clinical studies and was reported by Murphree and Bircher, based on unpublished observations by these researchers, to be psychedelic at oral doses of 15 to 20 mg and to have marked visual effects. Side effects have included abdominal pain, diarrhea, dizziness, headache, depressed feelings, dilated pupils, increased heart rate, increased blood pressure, urinary retention, and urinary hesitancy. It has been reported to have strongly increased effects on smooth muscle relative to AMT, which is implicated in the urinary difficulty.

== Pharmacology ==
=== Pharmacodynamics ===
4-HO-AMT has been found to produce electroencephalogram (EEG) changes in animals.

4-Hydroxylation of dimethyltryptamine (DMT) into the related compound psilocin (4-HO-DMT) has been found to abolish its serotonin release induction in human embryonic kidney 293 (HEK293) stably transfected with the serotonin transporter (SERT) in vitro.

== Chemistry ==
=== Analogues ===
Analogues of 4-HO-AMT include α-methyltryptamine (AMT), 4-HO-AET, 5-MeO-AMT, 4-methyl-AMT, 5-fluoro-AMT, 6-fluoro-AMT, and α-methylserotonin (5-HO-AMT), among others.

== History ==
4-HO-AMT was first described in the scientific literature by 1963.

== See also ==
- Substituted α-alkyltryptamine
