= 4-Methyl-α-methyltryptamine =

Drug belonging to the tryptamine class

4-Me-αMT

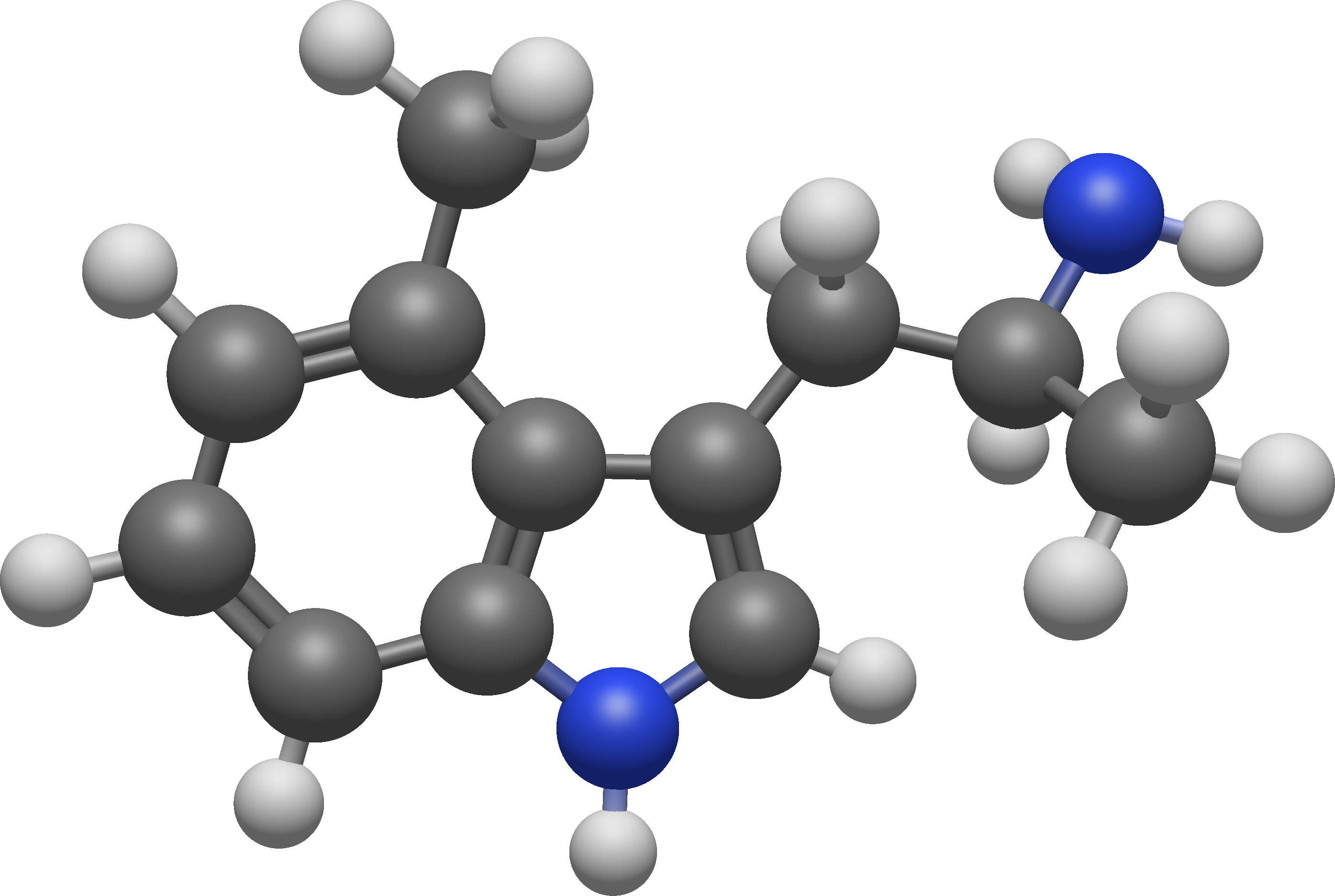

Clinical data
- Other names: 4-Me-αMT; 4-Me-AMT; 4-Methyl-αMT; 4-Methyl-AMT; 4,α-Dimethyltryptamine; 4,α-DMT; MP-809; MP809; Methyl-2-methyltryptamine
- Routes of administration: Oral
- Drug class: Antidepressant
- ATC code: None

Legal status
- Legal status: Uncontrolled (but may be covered under the Federal Analogue Act in the United States and under similar bills in other countries)

Identifiers
- IUPAC name: 1-methyl-2-(4-methyl-1H-indol-3-yl)-ethylamine
- CAS Number: 3569-29-7
- PubChem CID: 28806639
- ChemSpider: 25392939
- UNII: QY99ES7YWD
- CompTox Dashboard (EPA): DTXSID70708203

Chemical and physical data
- Formula: C_{12}H_{16}N_{2}
- Molar mass: 188.274 g·mol^{−1}
- 3D model (JSmol): Interactive image
- SMILES: CC(N)Cc2c1c([nH]c2)cccc1C
- InChI: InChI=1S/C12H16N2/c1-8-4-3-5-11-12(8)10(7-14-11)6-9(2)13/h3-5,7,9,14H,6,13H2,1-2H3; Key:KEOYEGHPRBDSKD-UHFFFAOYSA-N

4-Me-αMT (developmental code name MP-809), or 4-Me-AMT, also known as 4-methyl-α-methyltryptamine or as 4,α-dimethyltryptamine (4,α-DMT), is an experimental antidepressant of the tryptamine and α-alkyltryptamine families that was never marketed. It is closely structurally related to serotonergic psychedelics and entactogens like α-methyltryptamine (αMT) and α-ethyltryptamine (αET).

== Use and effects ==
4-Me-αMT is active at a dose of 20 to 60 mg orally in humans, though described as being an antidepressant rather than a hallucinogen. It was found to be effective as an antidepressant in preliminary clinical studies. Alexander Shulgin has said that 4-Me-αMT produced some feelings of unreality at 20 mg, as well as skin flushing, muscle tightness, and mydriasis. However, he has said that it could not be called a hallucinogen at assessed doses and has listed the hallucinogenic dose as being greater than 60 mg.

== Pharmacology ==
=== Pharmacodynamics ===
4-Me-αMT partially reverses reserpine-induced behavioral depression in rodents (by up to 60%), but does not produce hyperlocomotion. This was the case at a dose of 50 mg/kg, whereas αMT produced clear hyperlocomotion and near-fully reversed reserpine-induced hypoactivity (by 95%) at a dose of 15 mg/kg. Hence, 4-Me-αMT shows reduced antidepressant- and psychostimulant-like potency compared to αMT. It is also less active than αET. The drug is said to have very weak monoamine oxidase inhibition.

== Chemistry ==
=== Analogues ===
Analogues of 4-methyl-AMT include α-methyltryptamine (AMT), 4-methyl-AET, 4-methyl-DMT, 4-HO-AMT, 4-HO-AET, and RS134-49 (4-methyl-THPI), among others.

== History ==
4-Me-αMT was first described in the scientific literature by 1962. It was investigated as an antidepressant by Sandoz in Canada in the early 1960s, although it was never marketed.

== See also ==
- Substituted α-alkyltryptamine
