= LY-456220 =

Chemical compound

Identifiers
- IUPAC name: (S)-1-(2-(4-(6-fluoro-1H-indol-3-yl)-3,6-dihydropyridin-1(2H)-yl)ethyl)isochromane-6-carboxamide
- CAS Number: 439081-94-4
- PubChem CID: 69904149
- ChemSpider: 7977949

Chemical and physical data
- Formula: C_{25}H_{26}FN_{3}O_{2}
- Molar mass: 419.500 g·mol^{−1}
- 3D model (JSmol): Interactive image
- SMILES: C1CN(CC=C1C2=CNC3=C2C=CC(=C3)F)CCC4C5=C(CCO4)C=C(C=C5)C(=O)N
- InChI: InChI=1S/C25H26FN3O2/c26-19-2-4-21-22(15-28-23(21)14-19)16-5-9-29(10-6-16)11-7-24-20-3-1-18(25(27)30)13-17(20)8-12-31-24/h1-5,13-15,24,28H,6-12H2,(H2,27,30)/t24-/m0/s1; Key:AYGLZYIWAZBQDC-DEOSSOPVSA-N

LY-456220 is a potent and selective serotonin 5-HT_{1D} receptor antagonist which has been used in research to study the function of presynaptic 5-HT_{1D} autoreceptors. LY-456220 lacks significant affinity for the 5-HT_{1B}, α_{1} adrenergic, and dopamine D_{2} receptors. It is an enantiomer of LY-456219.
