= Dopamine releasing agent =

Type of drug

Amphetamine, an NDRA and one of the most well-known DRAs.

4-Methylaminorex (4-MAR), the cis- isomer being one of the most dopamine-selective NDRAs known.

A dopamine releasing agent (DRA) is a type of drug which induces the release of dopamine in the body and/or brain.

No selective DRAs are currently known. However, non-selective DRAs, including norepinephrine–dopamine releasing agents (NDRAs) like amphetamine and methamphetamine, serotonin–norepinephrine–dopamine releasing agents (SNDRAs) like MDMA and mephedrone, and serotonin–dopamine releasing agents (SDRAs) like 5-chloro-αMT and BK-NM-AMT, are known.

A closely related type of drug is a dopamine reuptake inhibitor (DRI). In contrast to the case of DRAs, many selective DRIs are known. Examples of selective DRIs include amineptine, modafinil, and vanoxerine.

== Selectivity ==
No selective and robust DRAs are currently known. The lack of known selective DRAs is related to the fact that it has proven extremely difficult to separate dopamine transporter (DAT) affinity from norepinephrine transporter (NET) affinity and retain releasing capability at the same time. Despite evaluation of over 350 compounds, it was reported in 2007 that it had been virtually impossible to dissociate norepinephrine and dopamine release. By 2014, still no selective DRAs had been identified, despite approximately 1,400 compounds having been screened. Similarly, while moderately selective norepinephrine releasing agents (NRAs) are known (e.g., ~10- to 20-fold preference or norepinephrine over dopamine release), no highly selective NRAs had been identified. The inability to identify selective DRAs has been attributed to the strong phylogenetic similarities between the DAT and NET. Although no selective DRAs have been identified, selective SDRAs, albeit with concomitant serotonin receptor agonism, were described in 2014. SDRAs without known serotonin receptor agonism, such as BK-NM-AMT, were described by 2019.

Although no selective DRAs are currently known, many non-selective releasing agents of both dopamine and norepinephrine (norepinephrine–dopamine releasing agents or NDRAs) and of serotonin, norepinephrine, and dopamine (serotonin–norepinephrine–dopamine releasing agents or SNDRAs) are known. Examples of major NDRAs include the psychostimulants amphetamine and methamphetamine, while an example of an SNDRA is the entactogen methylenedioxymethamphetamine (MDMA). These drugs are frequently used for recreational purposes and encountered as drugs of abuse. DRAs, including NDRAs and theoretically also selective DRAs, have medical utility in the treatment of attention deficit hyperactivity disorder (ADHD). SDRAs, for instance 5-chloro-αMT, are less common and are not selective for dopamine release, but have also been developed. Tryptamines like 5-chloro-αMT are the only known releaser scaffold that consistently release dopamine more potently than norepinephrine.

== Therapeutic applications ==
Selective DRAs might have different clinical effects in the treatment of attention deficit hyperactivity disorder (ADHD) than the NDRAs like amphetamines and norepinephrine–dopamine reuptake inhibitors (NDRIs) like methylphenidate that are currently used. For example, they might have improved therapeutic selectivity by reducing or eliminating the cardiovascular and sympathomimetic side effects of NDRAs.

== Examples of DRAs ==
Amphetamines like dextroamphetamine and dextromethamphetamine are fairly balanced NDRAs but release norepinephrine about 2- to 3-fold more potently than dopamine. However, other studies found that dextroamphetamine and dextromethamphetamine were roughly equipotent or slightly favored dopamine in terms of norepinephrine versus dopamine release. A number of potentially more well-balanced NDRAs, including levomethcathinone (l-MC), 3-chloroamphetamine (3-CA; PAL-304), 3-chloromethcathinone (3-CMC; clophedrone; PAL-434), and 2-phenylmorpholine (2-PM; PAL-632), are known, and all appear to be roughly equipotent in inducing dopamine versus norepinephrine release. A few NDRAs, including cis-4-methylaminorex (cis-4-MAR), 3-chlorophenmetrazine (3-CPM; PAL-594), and naphthylmetrazine (PAL-704), appear to release dopamine about 2- to 3-fold more potently than norepinephrine, and hence may be among the most dopamine-selective NDRAs known.

Pemoline, which is structurally related to the aminorex drugs, is a stimulant used to treat ADHD which is said to act as a selective DRI and DRA, but it is said to only weakly stimulate dopamine release. There is reportedly some, albeit mixed, in-vitro evidence that the antidepressant and modestly selective DRI amineptine may, in addition to inhibiting the reuptake of dopamine, selectively induce the presynaptic release of dopamine without affecting release of norepinephrine or serotonin. However, amineptine is larger than the known small structural size limit of monoamine releasing agents, suggesting that it may not in fact be a DRA.

Although no definite selective DRAs have been described, one possible exception is 2-fluoromethcathinone (2-FMC). It has an EC_{50} for dopamine release of 48.7 nM but induces only 85% release of norepinephrine at a concentration of 10 μM. For comparison, the EC_{50} values of the NDRA methcathinone are 49.9 nM for dopamine release and 22.4 nM for norepinephrine release and it induces 100% release of norepinephrine at a concentration of 10 μM. Hence, compared to methcathinone, 2-FMC appears to be relatively more selective or efficacious for induction of dopamine release over norepinephrine release. In any case, the EC_{50} of 2-FMC for induction of norepinephrine release does not seem to be available. Moreover, in another instance, the related drug 3-methoxymethcathinone (3-MeOMC) released only 68% norepinephrine at 10 μM, yet an EC_{50} value of the drug of 111 nM for induction of norepinephrine release was provided in another publication.

== See also ==
- Monoamine releasing agent
- Norepinephrine–dopamine releasing agent
- Serotonin–dopamine releasing agent
- Serotonin–norepinephrine–dopamine releasing agent
- Norepinephrine releasing agent
- Serotonin releasing agent
