= C11H13ClN2 =

The molecular formula C_{11}H_{13}ClN_{2} (molar mass: 208.69 g/mol, exact mass: 208.0767 u) may refer to:

- 5-Chloro-αMT (5-chloro-α-methyltryptamine or PAL-542)
- Epibatidine
