= LY-456219 =

Chemical compound

Identifiers
- IUPAC name: (R)-1-(2-(4-(6-fluoro-1H-indol-3-yl)-3,6-dihydropyridin-1(2H)-yl)ethyl)isochromane-6-carboxamide
- CAS Number: 721417-35-2
- PubChem CID: 90987586
- ChemSpider: 7977949
- ChEMBL: ChEMBL83617
- CompTox Dashboard (EPA): DTXSID701336906

Chemical and physical data
- Formula: C_{25}H_{26}FN_{3}O_{2}
- Molar mass: 419.500 g·mol^{−1}
- 3D model (JSmol): Interactive image
- SMILES: O=C(C1=CC2=C([C@@H](CCN3CC=C(C4=CNC5=C4C=CC(F)=C5)CC3)OCC2)C=C1)N
- InChI: InChI=1S/C25H26FN3O2/c26-19-2-4-21-22(15-28-23(21)14-19)16-5-9-29(10-6-16)11-7-24-20-3-1-18(25(27)30)13-17(20)8-12-31-24/h1-5,13-15,24,28H,6-12H2,(H2,27,30)/t24-/m1/s1; Key:AYGLZYIWAZBQDC-XMMPIXPASA-N

LY-456219 is a potent and selective serotonin 5-HT_{1D} receptor antagonist which has been used in research to study the function of presynaptic 5-HT_{1D} autoreceptors. LY-456219 lacks significant affinity for the 5-HT_{1B}, α_{1} adrenergic, and dopamine D_{2} receptors. It is an enantiomer of LY-456220.
