= DMAI =

Clinical data
- Other names: BD-214; BD214; UCD0076; UCD-0076; 4-DMAEI; 4-(N,N-Dimethylaminoethyl)indole
- Drug class: Serotonin receptor modulator; Serotonin 5-HT_{2A} receptor antagonist; Serotonin 5-HT_{2B} receptor agonist; Serotonin 5-HT_{2C} receptor agonist; Dopamine D_{2} receptor agonist
- ATC code: None

Identifiers
- IUPAC name: 2-(1H-indol-4-yl)-N,N-dimethylethanamine
- CAS Number: 84401-01-4
- PubChem CID: 12825951
- ChemSpider: 10400106

Chemical and physical data
- Formula: C_{12}H_{16}N_{2}
- Molar mass: 188.274 g·mol^{−1}
- 3D model (JSmol): Interactive image
- SMILES: CN(C)CCC1=C2C=CNC2=CC=C1
- InChI: InChI=1S/C12H16N2/c1-14(2)9-7-10-4-3-5-12-11(10)6-8-13-12/h3-6,8,13H,7,9H2,1-2H3; Key:CUMMXOMCIOVFBY-UHFFFAOYSA-N

DMAI, also known as BD-214, UCD0076, or 4-(N,N-dimethylaminoethyl)indole (4-DMAEI), is a monoamine receptor modulator of the phenethylamine family. It is the positional isomer of the psychedelic drug dimethyltryptamine (DMT) in which the side chain has been moved from the 3 position to the 4 position, making the compound a phenethylamine rather than a tryptamine. The drug can also be considered a partial ergoline.

== Pharmacology ==
=== Pharmacodynamics ===
DMAI shows weak affinity for the serotonin 5-HT_{2A} receptor (K_{i} = 1,970 nM). The drug shows no agonism of the serotonin 5-HT_{2A} receptor, instead acting as a weak antagonist of this receptor. It is a partial agonist of the serotonin 5-HT_{2B} receptor, with an EC_{50} of 1,630 nM and an E_{max} of 44%. In addition, it is a potent high-efficacy partial agonist of the serotonin 5-HT_{2C} receptor, with an EC_{50} of 334 nM and an E_{max} of 83%. DMAI is also a high-efficacy agonist of the serotonin 5-HT_{1} receptors, with EC_{50} values of approximately 500 to 800 nM (except 134 nM at 5-HT_{1D}) and E_{max} values of greater than 80%. It is a potent and moderate-efficacy partial agonist of the dopamine D_{2} receptor, with an EC_{50} of 588 nM and an E_{max} of 43%.

In accordance with its lack of serotonin 5-HT_{2A} receptor agonism, DMAI failed to produce the head-twitch response, a behavioral proxy of psychedelic effects, in rodents. Instead, it suppressed the 5-MeO-DMT-induced head-twitch response and antagonized amphetamine-induced hyperlocomotion, effects suggestive of antipsychotic-like activity. The drug has also been reported to produce sympathomimetic effects in cats, which might be mediated by α_{1}-adrenergic receptor stimulation or α_{2}-adrenergic receptor antagonism. It robustly suppresses prolactin levels in rodents, which is assumed to be due to its dopamine D_{2} receptor agonism.

== Chemistry ==
The chemical synthesis of DMAI has been described. Some analogues of DMAI include DEAI (4-(N,N-diethylaminoethyl)indole; 4-DEAEI; BD-271) and DPAI (4-(N,N-dipropylaminoethyl)indole; 4-DPAEI; 2-desoxo-2-ene-ropinirole; BD-179).

== History ==
DMAI was first described in the scientific literature by 1984. Subsequently, it was described in greater detail by David E. Olson and colleagues in 2026.

== See also ==
- Dimethylaminoethylindole
- Substituted phenethylamine
- Partial ergoline
- 4-(2-Aminopropyl)indole (4-API)
