= 2-Fluoromethcathinone =

Designer stimulant

Clinical data
- Other names: 2-FMC; 2-Fluoromethylcathinone; 2-Fluoro-N-methylcathinone; 2-Flephedrone
- Drug class: Stimulant; Norepinephrine–dopamine releasing agent

Identifiers
- IUPAC name: 1-(2-fluorophenyl)-2-(methylamino)propan-1-one
- CAS Number: 1186137-35-8
- PubChem CID: 71316821
- ChemSpider: 37701826
- UNII: 7NLX9J64KY
- CompTox Dashboard (EPA): DTXSID401017070

Chemical and physical data
- Formula: C_{10}H_{12}FNO
- Molar mass: 181.210 g·mol^{−1}
- 3D model (JSmol): Interactive image
- SMILES: CC(C(=O)C1=CC=CC=C1F)NC
- InChI: InChI=1S/C10H12FNO/c1-7(12-2)10(13)8-5-3-4-6-9(8)11/h3-7,12H,1-2H3; Key:DCMOUMKIDLRIBO-UHFFFAOYSA-N

2-Fluoromethcathinone (2-FMC), also known as 2-flephedrone, is a psychostimulant and designer drug of the cathinone family. It acts as a dopamine and norepinephrine releasing agent (NDRA).

== Pharmacology ==
The drug has an EC_{50} for dopamine release of 48.7 nM and induces 85% release of norepinephrine at a concentration of 10 μM. For comparison, the EC_{50} values of methcathinone are 49.9 nM for dopamine release and 22.4 nM for norepinephrine release and it induces 100% release of norepinephrine at a concentration of 10 μM. Hence, compared to methcathinone, 2-FMC appears to be relatively more selective or efficacious for induction of dopamine release over norepinephrine release. It is notable in this regard that selective dopamine releasing agents are largely unknown.

== See also ==
- 3-Methoxymethcathinone
- 3-Fluoromethcathinone
- 4-Fluoromethcathinone (flephedrone)
- 2-Fluoromethamphetamine
