= Aminopropylindole =

Aminopropylindole (API), also known as pyrroloamphetamine in the case of phenethylamines, may refer to:

- 1-(2-Aminopropyl)indole (1-API; 1-IT; α-methylisotryptamine; isoAMT; PAL-569) – an α-alkylisotryptamine
- 2-(2-Aminopropyl)indole (2-API; 2-IT) – neither an amphetamine, tryptamine, nor isotryptamine
- 3-(2-Aminopropyl)indole (3-API; 3-IT; α-methyltryptamine; AMT; PAL-17) – an α-alkyltryptamine
- 4-(2-Aminopropyl)indole (4-API; 4-IT) – an amphetamine
- 5-(2-Aminopropyl)indole (5-API; 5-IT; 3,4-pyrrolo[b]amphetamine; PAL-571) – an amphetamine
- 6-(2-Aminopropyl)indole (6-API; 6-IT) – an amphetamine
- 7-(2-Aminopropyl)indole (7-API; 7-IT) – an amphetamine
Chemical structures of aminopropylindole (API) positional isomers
1-API (isoAMT)

2-API

3-API (AMT)

4-API

5-API

6-API

7-API

== See also ==
- Indolylethylamine (aminoethylindole)
- Dimethylaminoethylindole
- Substituted benzofuran
- Substituted benzothiophene
- Substituted methylenedioxyphenethylamine
