= 4-(2-Aminopropyl)indole =

Clinical data
- Other names: 4-API; 4-IT; α-Methylisotryptamine; α-Me-isotryptamine; α-Me-isoT
- Drug class: Serotonin receptor modulator; Serotonin 5-HT_{2} receptor modulator; Monoamine oxidase inhibitor
- ATC code: None

Identifiers
- IUPAC name: 1-(1H-indol-4-yl)propan-2-amine
- CAS Number: 21005-59-4
- PubChem CID: 55254455
- ChemSpider: 26495445

Chemical and physical data
- Formula: C_{11}H_{14}N_{2}
- Molar mass: 174.247 g·mol^{−1}
- 3D model (JSmol): Interactive image
- SMILES: CC(CC1=C2C=CNC2=CC=C1)N
- InChI: InChI=1S/C11H14N2/c1-8(12)7-9-3-2-4-11-10(9)5-6-13-11/h2-6,8,13H,7,12H2,1H3; Key:FSNFARLFBCWJMF-UHFFFAOYSA-N

4-(2-Aminopropyl)indole (4-API), also known in the past as α-methylisotryptamine (α-Me-isoT), is a serotonin receptor modulator of the phenethylamine and amphetamine families. It is one of seven possible positional isomers of (2-aminopropyl)indole (API), with other examples including α-methyltryptamine (AMT; 3-API) and α-methylisotryptamine (isoAMT; 1-API). The drug is a sort of hybrid structure between phenethylamines and tryptamines.

It shows affinity for the serotonin 5-HT_{2} receptor (K_{i} = 5,000 nM), with its affinity being only 2-fold lower than that of AMT (K_{i} = 2,500 nM) in the same study. The drug reverses the facilitation of pentylenetetrazol-induced seizures evoked by the monoamine depleting agent reserpine in rodents, albeit with much lower potency than AMT (10-fold) and certain other API positional isomers. It showed activity as a monoamine oxidase inhibitor (MAOI) in vitro, with slightly higher potency than AMT.

The synthesis and identification of 4-API have been described.

4-API was first described in the literature in a patent as a potential antiasthmatic agent by Albert Hofmann and Franz Troxler at Sandoz in 1963. Subsequently, it was studied by Aurelio Cerletti and colleagues in 1968 and by Richard Glennon and colleagues in 1988. The drug was referred to as "α-methyl-isotryptamine" or "α-Me-isoT" by Glennon and colleagues, but this term subsequently came to be used to refer to 1-API instead. Certain APIs, such as AMT and 5-(2-aminopropyl)indole (5-API), have been encountered as novel designer drugs, but 4-API does not appear to have been encountered as of 2014.

Chemical structures of selected APIs and related compounds
4-API

3-API (AMT)

RU-27849 (4,α-methylene-T)

Diaza-2C-DFLY

== See also ==
- Substituted amphetamine
- Aminopropylindole
- Partial ergoline
- DMAI (4-DMAEI)
