= 4-HO-AET =

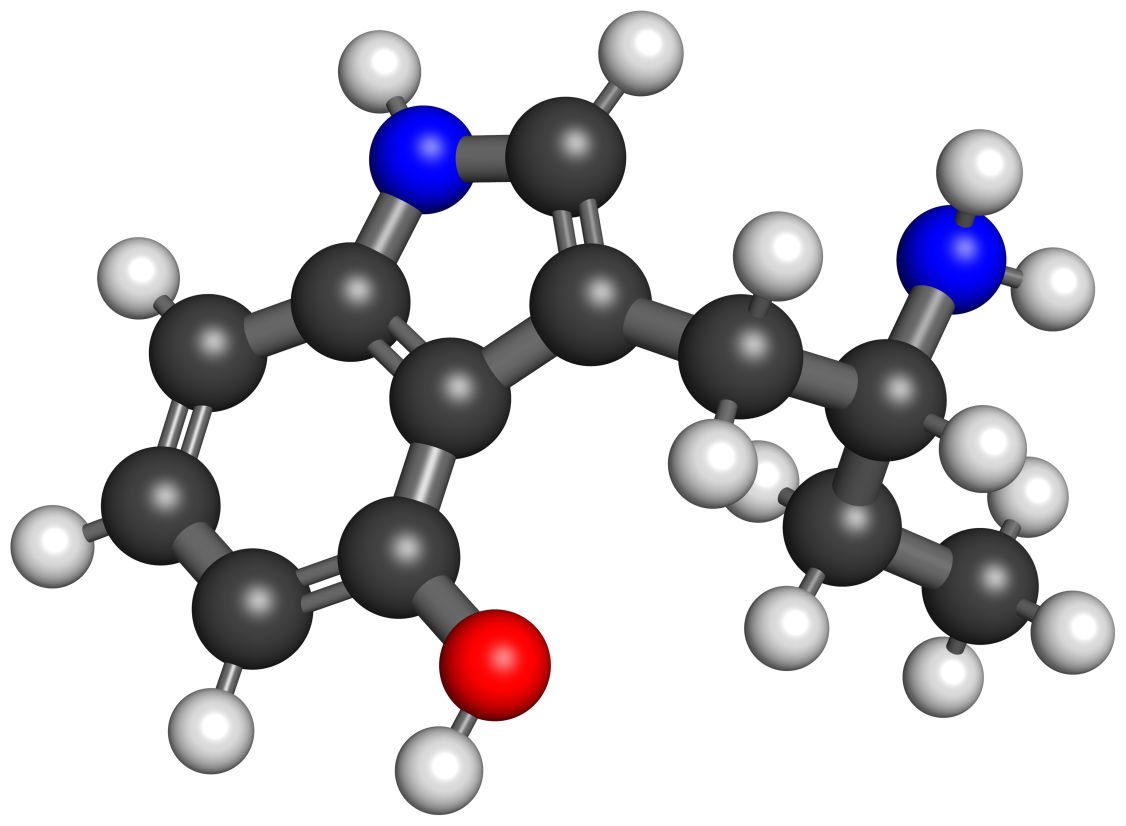

Clinical data
- Other names: 4-OH-AET; 4-HO-αET; 4-OH-αET; 4-Hydroxy-α-ethyltryptamine
- ATC code: None

Identifiers
- IUPAC name: 3-(2-aminobutyl)-1H-indol-4-ol
- PubChem CID: 130007892
- ChemSpider: 74889811

Chemical and physical data
- Formula: C_{12}H_{16}N_{2}O
- Molar mass: 204.273 g·mol^{−1}
- 3D model (JSmol): Interactive image
- SMILES: CCC(CC1=CNC2=C1C(=CC=C2)O)N
- InChI: InChI=1S/C12H16N2O/c1-2-9(13)6-8-7-14-10-4-3-5-11(15)12(8)10/h3-5,7,9,14-15H,2,6,13H2,1H3; Key:GIJVUFHSPGKRKQ-UHFFFAOYSA-N

4-HO-AET, or 4-HO-αET, also known as 4-hydroxy-α-ethyltryptamine, is a psychoactive drug of the tryptamine and α-alkyltryptamine families related to α-ethyltryptamine (ΑΕΤ or αET). It has been encountered as a novel designer drug of interest on online drug discussion forums.

== Chemistry ==
=== Analogues ===
Analogues of 4-HO-AET include α-ethyltryptamine, 4-HO-AMT, α-methylserotonin (5-HO-AMT), 5-MeO-AMT, 4-methyl-AMT, 5-fluoro-AET, and 5-chloro-AET, among others.

== See also ==
- Substituted α-alkyltryptamine
