= Indolylethylamine =

Indolylethylamine, also known as aminoethylindole, may refer to:

- Tryptamine (2-(1H-indol-3-yl)ethan-1-amine) (and substituted tryptamines)
- Isotryptamine (2-(1H-indol-1-yl)ethanamine) (and substituted isotryptamines)

== See also ==
- Phenethylamine (and substituted phenethylamines)
- Dimethylaminoethylindole (DMAEI)
- Aminopropylindole (API; indolylpropylamine)
