= Dimethylaminoethylindole =

Dimethylaminoethylindole (DMAEI), also known as N,N-dimethylpyrrolophenethylamine in the case of phenethylamines, may refer to:

- 1-[2-(Dimethylamino)ethyl]indole (1-DMAEI; isoDMT; N,N-dimethylisotryptamine) – an isotryptamine
- 2-[2-(Dimethylamino)ethyl]indole (2-DMAEI) – neither a phenethylamine, tryptamine, nor isotryptamine
- 3-[2-(Dimethylamino)ethyl]indole (3-DMAEI; DMT; N,N-dimethyltryptamine) – a tryptamine
- 4-[2-(Dimethylamino)ethyl]indole (4-DMAEI; DMAI; BD-214; UCD0076) – a phenethylamine
- 5-[2-(Dimethylamino)ethyl]indole (5-DMAEI) – a phenethylamine
- 6-[2-(Dimethylamino)ethyl]indole (6-DMAEI) – a phenethylamine
- 7-[2-(Dimethylamino)ethyl]indole (7-DMAEI) – a phenethylamine
Chemical structures of dimethylaminoethylindole (DMAEI) positional isomers
1-DMAEI (isoDMT)

2-DMAEI

3-DMAEI (DMT)

4-DMAEI (DMAI; BD-214; UCD0076)

5-DMAEI

6-DMAEI

7-DMAEI

== See also ==
- Aminopropylindole
- Indolylethylamine (aminoethylindole)
- Substituted benzofuran
- Substituted benzothiophene
- Substituted methylenedioxyphenethylamine
