= Α-Ethyltryptamine =

Chemical compound

α-Ethyltryptamine INN: Etryptamine

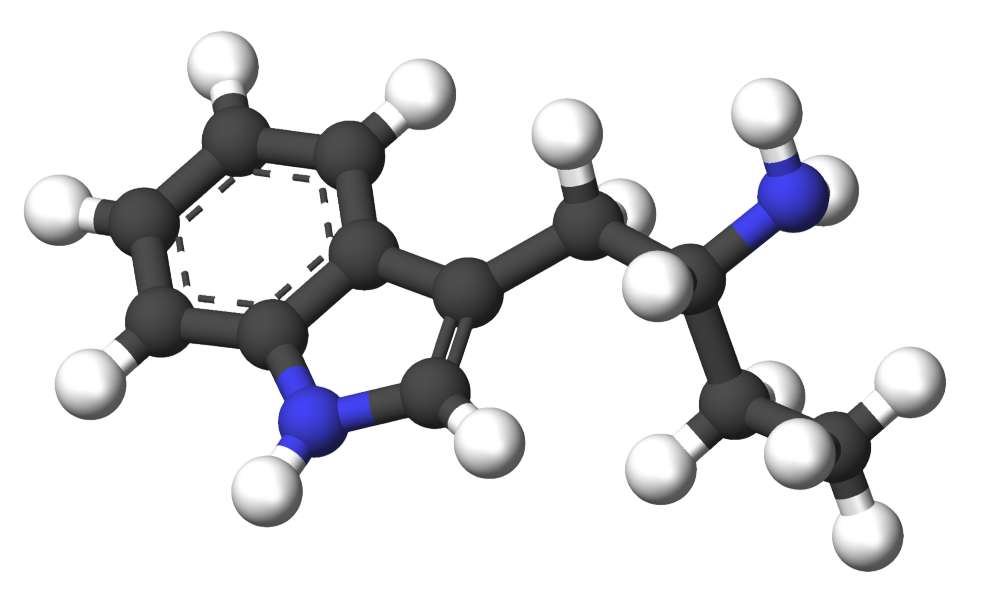

Clinical data
- Trade names: Monase
- Other names: alpha-Ethyltryptamine; αET; AET; α-ET; Etryptamine; PAL-125; 3-(2-Aminobutyl)indole; 3-Indolylbutylamine; U-17312E; U17312E; Ro 3-1932; NSC-63963; NSC-88061, Etryptamine (USAN US)
- Routes of administration: Oral
- Drug class: Entactogen; Stimulant; Serotonin-norepinephrine-dopamine releasing agent; Serotonin receptor agonist; Monoamine oxidase inhibitor; Serotonergic neurotoxin
- ATC code: None

Legal status
- Legal status: BR: Class F2 (Prohibited psychotropics); CA: Schedule III; DE: Anlage I (Authorized scientific use only); UK: Class A; US: Schedule I; UN: Psychotropic Schedule I

Pharmacokinetic data
- Metabolism: Hydroxylation
- Metabolites: • 6-Hydroxy-αET (inactive)
- Onset of action: 0.5–1.5 hours
- Elimination half-life: ~8 hours
- Duration of action: 6–8 hours (100–150 mg)
- Excretion: Urine (majority)

Identifiers
- IUPAC name: 1-(1H-indol-3-yl)butan-2-amine
- CAS Number: 2235-90-7 118-68-3 (acetate) 26330-11-0 (hydrochloride)
- PubChem CID: 8367
- PubChem SID: 46507084
- DrugBank: DB01546
- ChemSpider: 8064
- UNII: GR181O3R32
- KEGG: D04092
- ChEBI: CHEBI:134838
- ChEMBL: ChEMBL1619758
- CompTox Dashboard (EPA): DTXSID1046764

Chemical and physical data
- Formula: C_{12}H_{16}N_{2}
- Molar mass: 188.274 g·mol^{−1}
- 3D model (JSmol): Interactive image
- Melting point: 222 to 223 °C (432 to 433 °F)
- SMILES: CCC(N)CC1=CNC2=CC=CC=C12
- InChI: InChI=1S/C12H16N2/c1-2-10(13)7-9-8-14-12-6-4-3-5-11(9)12/h3-6,8,10,14H,2,7,13H2,1H3; Key:ZXUMUPVQYAFTLF-UHFFFAOYSA-N

α-Ethyltryptamine (αET, AET), also known as etryptamine, is an entactogen and stimulant drug of the tryptamine family. It was originally developed and marketed as an antidepressant under the brand name Monase by Upjohn in the 1960s before being withdrawn due to toxicity.

Side effects of αET include facial flushing, headache, gastrointestinal distress, insomnia, irritability, appetite loss, and sedation, among others. A rare side effect of αET is agranulocytosis. αET acts as a releasing agent of serotonin, norepinephrine, and dopamine, as a weak serotonin receptor agonist, and as a weak monoamine oxidase inhibitor. It may also produce serotonergic neurotoxicity. αET is a substituted tryptamine and is closely related to α-methyltryptamine (αMT) and other α-alkylated tryptamines.

αET was first described in 1947. It was used as an antidepressant for about a year around 1961. The drug started being used recreationally in the 1980s and several deaths have been reported. αET is a controlled substance in various countries, including the United States and United Kingdom. There has been renewed interest in αET, for instance as an alternative to MDMA, with the development of psychedelics and entactogens as medicines in the 2020s.

== Use and effects ==
αET was previously used medically as an antidepressant and "psychic energizer" to treat people with depression. It was used for this indication under the brand name Monase. The drug was available pharmaceutically as the acetate salt under the brand name Monase as 15 mg oral tablets.

αET is reported to have entactogen and weak psychostimulant effects. Euphoria, increased energy, openness, and empathy have been specifically reported. Unlike αMT and other tryptamines, αET is not reported to have psychedelic or hallucinogenic effects. The drug is described as less stimulating and intense than MDMA ("ecstasy") but as otherwise having entactogenic effects resembling those of MDMA. The dose of αET used recreationally has been reported to be 100 to 160 mg, its onset of action has been reported to be 0.5 to 1.5 hours, and its duration of action at the preceding doses is described as 6 to 8 hours. Rapid tolerance to repeated administration of αET has been described.

== Side effects ==
Side effects of αET at antidepressant doses have included facial flushing, headache, gastrointestinal distress, insomnia, irritability, and sedation. Additional side effects of αET at recreational doses have included appetite loss and feelings of intoxication. Feelings of lethargy and sedation can occur once the drug wears off.

As with many other serotonin releasing agents, toxicity, such as serotonin syndrome, can occur when excessive doses are taken or when combined with certain drugs such as monoamine oxidase inhibitors (MAOIs). Several deaths have been associated with recreational use of αET.

Rarely, agranulocytosis has occurred with prolonged administration of αET at antidepressant doses and has been said to have resulted in several cases and/or deaths.

== Overdose ==
αET has been administered in clinical studies at doses of up to 300 mg per day. An approximate but unconfirmed 700 mg dose resulted in fatal hyperthermia and agitated delirium in one case. LD_{50} doses of αET for various species have been studied and described. Treatment of αET intoxication or overdose is supportive. Severe and potentially life-threatening hyperthermia may occur. Serotonergic toxicity associated with serotonergic agents like αET can be managed with benzodiazepines and with the serotonin receptor antagonist cyproheptadine.

== Pharmacology ==
=== Pharmacodynamics ===
Similarly to αMT, αET is a releasing agent of serotonin, norepinephrine and dopamine, with serotonin being the primary neurotransmitter affected. It is about 10-fold more potent in inducing serotonin release than in inducing dopamine release and about 28-fold more potent in inducing serotonin release than in inducing norepinephrine release. The (+)-enantiomer of αET, (+)-αET, is a serotonin–dopamine releasing agent (SDRA) and is one of the few such agents known. It is about 1.7-fold more potent in inducing serotonin release than in inducing dopamine release, about 17-fold more potent in inducing serotonin release than in inducing norepinephrine release, and is about 10-fold more potent in inducing dopamine release than in inducing norepinephrine release.

In addition to acting as a monoamine releasing agent, αET acts as a serotonin receptor agonist. It is known to act as a weak partial agonist of the serotonin 5-HT_{2A} receptor (EC_{50} > 10,000 nM; E_{max} = 21%). (–)-αET is inactive as a 5-HT_{2A} receptor agonist at concentrations of up to 10 μM, whereas (+)-αET is a 5-HT_{2A} receptor agonist with an EC_{50} value of 1,250 nM and an E_{max} value of 61%. αET has been found to be 150- to 200-fold less potent than αMT as a serotonin receptor agonist in the rat stomach strip. αET has also been found to have weak affinity for the 5-HT_{1}, 5-HT_{1E}, 5-HT_{1F}, and 5-HT_{2B} receptors.

Activities of αET, its enantiomers, and related compounds
Compound	Monoamine release (EC_{50}, nM)			5-HT_{2A} receptor agonism	
Compound	Serotonin	Dopamine	Norepinephrine	EC_{50} (nM)	E_{max} (%)
Tryptamine	32.6 ± 2.6	164 ± 16	716 ± 46	7.36 ± 0.56	104 ± 4
Serotonin	44.4 ± 5.3	>10,000	>10,000	ND	ND
DMT	114 ± 15	>10,000	4,166 ± 317	38.3 ± 0.81	83 ± 0.4
αMT	21.7 ± 1.0	78.6 ± 4.0	112 ± 6	23.1 ± 2.4	103 ± 3
αET	23.2 ± 1.7	232 ± 17	640 ± 76^{a}	>10,000	21 ± 11
(–)-αET	54.9 ± 7.8	654 ± 50	3,670 ± 1,190^{a}	>10,000	–
(+)-αET	34.7 ± 4.9	57.6 ± 3.1	592 ± 97^{a}	1,250 ± 310	61 ± 8
MDMA	56.6 ± 2.1	376 ± 16	77.4 ± 3.4	ND	ND
Notes: The smaller the value, the more strongly the compound produces the effect. Footnotes: ^{a} = αET, (–)-αET, and (+)-αET were norepinephrine partial releasers with E_{max} values of 78%, 75%, and 71%, respectively. Refs:

αET is a weak monoamine oxidase inhibitor (MAOI). It is specifically a selective and reversible inhibitor of monoamine oxidase A (MAO-A). An IC_{50} value of 260 μM in vitro and 80 to 100% inhibition of MAO-A at a dose of 10 mg/kg in rats in vivo have been reported. αET is described as slightly more potent as an MAOI than dextroamphetamine. Both enantiomers of αET have similar activity as MAOIs, whereas αET's major metabolite 6-hydroxy-αET is inactive. The relatively weak MAOI actions of αET have been considered unlikely to be involved in its stimulant, antidepressant, and other psychoactive effects by certain sources.

The stimulant effects of αET have been said to lie primarily in (–)-αET, whereas hallucinogenic effects have been said to be present in (+)-αET. However, these claims appear to be based on animal drug discrimination studies and are not necessarily in accordance with functional studies. Generalization to DOM may have been anomalous and due to the serotonin-releasing actions of αET rather than due to serotonin 5-HT_{2A} receptor activation and associated psychedelic effects. Accordingly, αET does not produce the head-twitch response in rodents, unlike known psychedelics. However, in another study, low doses of αET (0.5–1.0 mg/kg) did not produce the head-twitch response but a high dose (5 mg/kg) did produce the response. Clear hallucinogenic effects of αET have never been documented in humans even at high doses, although the individual enantiomers of αET have never been studied in humans.

αET has been found to produce serotonergic neurotoxicity similar to that of MDMA and para-chloroamphetamine (PCA) in rats. This has included long-lasting reductions in serotonin levels, 5-hydroxyindoleacetic acid (5-HIAA) levels, and serotonin uptake sites in the frontal cortex and hippocampus. The dosage of αET employed was 8 doses of 30 mg/kg by subcutaneous injection with doses spaced by 12-hour intervals. There are prominent species differences in the neurotoxicity of monoamine releasing agents. Primates appear to be more susceptible to the damage caused by serotonergic neurotoxins like MDMA than rodents.

=== Pharmacokinetics ===
The absorption of αET appears to be rapid. It has a relatively large volume of distribution. The drug undergoes hydroxylation to form the major metabolite 6-hydroxy-αET (3-(2-aminobutyl)-6-hydroxyindole). This metabolite is inactive. αET is eliminated primarily in urine and a majority of a dose is excreted in urine within 12 to 24 hours. Its elimination half-life is approximately 8 hours.

== Chemistry ==
αET, also known as α-ethyltryptamine or as 3-(2-aminobutyl)indole, is a substituted tryptamine and α-alkyltryptamine derivative.

=== Synthesis ===
The chemical synthesis of αET has been described. It can be synthesized in a two-step synthesis with commercial chemicals via the Henry reaction between indole-3-carboxaldehyde and nitropropane under amine salt or ionic liquid catalysis which produces 3-(2-nitrobut-1-enyl)-1H-indole, which can subsequently be reduced via a reducing such as lithium aluminum hydride to form α-ethyltryptamine.

=== Analogues ===
Analogues of αET include α-methyltryptamine (αMT), α-propyltryptamine (αPT), and other substituted α-alkylated tryptamines like 4-HO-αET, 5-MeO-αET, 5-chloro-αMT (PAL-542), and 5-fluoro-αET (PAL-545).

== History ==
αET was first described in the scientific literature in 1947. The enantiomers of αET were first individually described in 1970.

Originally believed to exert its effects predominantly via monoamine oxidase inhibition, αET was developed during the 1960s as an antidepressant by Upjohn chemical company in the United States under the generic name etryptamine and the brand name Monase, but was withdrawn from potential commercial use due to incidence of idiosyncratic agranulocytosis in several patients. It was on the market for about a year, around 1961, and was given to more than 5,000 patients, before being withdrawn. αET was usually used as an antidepressant at doses of 30 to 40 mg/day (but up to 75 mg/day), which are lower than the doses that have been used recreationally.

αET gained limited recreational popularity as a designer drug with MDMA-like effects in the 1980s. Subsequently, in the United States it was added to the Schedule I list of illegal substances in 1993 or 1994.

== Society and culture ==
=== Names ===
Etryptamine is the formal generic name of the drug and its INN and BAN. In the case of the acetate salt, its generic name is etryptamine acetate and this is its USAN. Etryptamine was used pharmaceutically as etryptamine acetate. Etryptamine is much more well known as alpha-ethyltryptamine or α-ethyltryptamine (abbreviated as αET, α-ET, or AET). Other synonyms of αET and/or its acetate salt include 3-(2-aminobutyl)indole, 3-indolylbutylamine, PAL-125, U-17312E, Ro 3-1932, NSC-63963, and NSC-88061, as well as its former brand name Monase.

=== Recreational use ===
αET has been used as a recreational drug since the 1980s. Purported street names include Trip, ET, Love Pearls, and Love Pills.

=== Legal status ===
==== Canada ====
αET (etryptamine) is a Schedule III controlled substance in Canada.

==== United Kingdom ====
αET is a Class A controlled substance in the United Kingdom.

==== United States ====
αET is a Schedule I controlled substance in the United States.

== Research ==
Besides depression, αET has been studied in people with schizophrenia and other conditions.

== See also ==
- Substituted α-alkyltryptamine
- Non-hallucinogenic 5-HT_{2A} receptor agonist
