= Α-Propyltryptamine =

α-Propyltryptamine

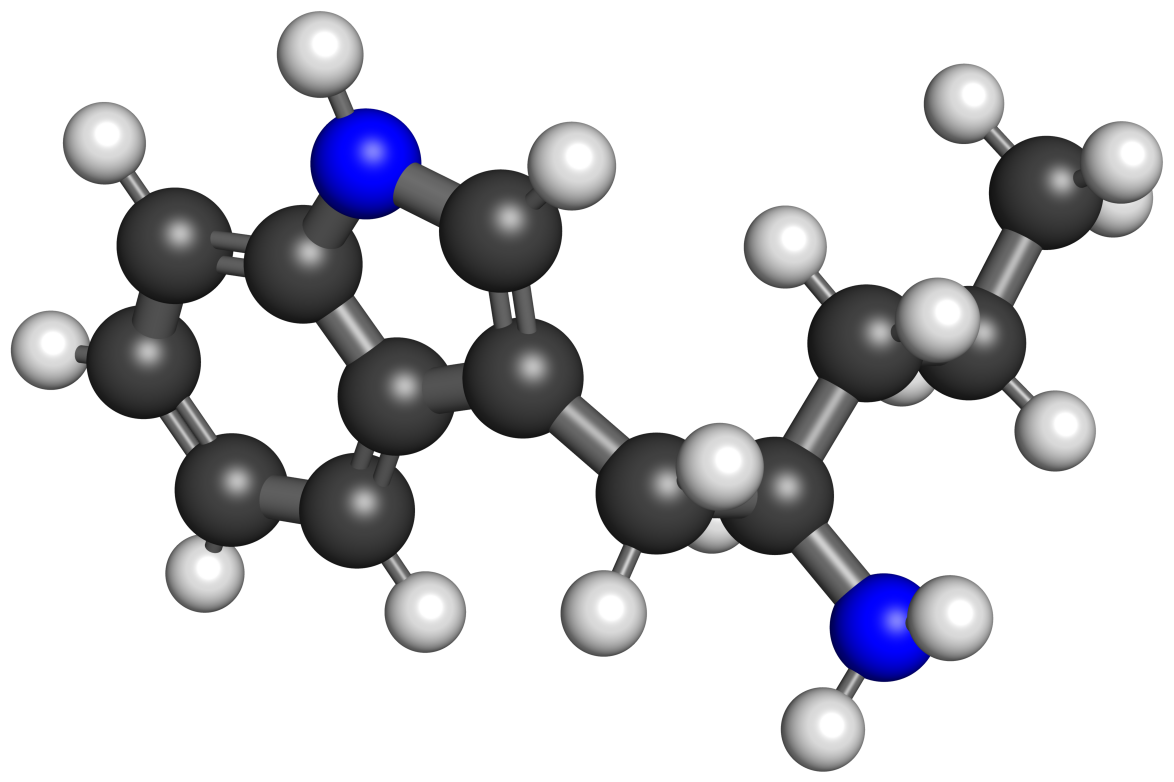

Clinical data
- Other names: APT; αPT; α-PT; alpha-Propyltryptamine
- ATC code: None

Identifiers
- IUPAC name: 1-(1H-indol-3-yl)pentan-2-amine
- PubChem CID: 24839494
- ChemSpider: 21250384

Chemical and physical data
- Formula: C_{13}H_{18}N_{2}
- Molar mass: 202.301 g·mol^{−1}
- 3D model (JSmol): Interactive image
- SMILES: CCCC(CC1=CNC2=CC=CC=C21)N
- InChI: InChI=1S/C13H18N2/c1-2-5-11(14)8-10-9-15-13-7-4-3-6-12(10)13/h3-4,6-7,9,11,15H,2,5,8,14H2,1H3; Key:OXTXKBQUVJLMPO-UHFFFAOYSA-N

α-Propyltryptamine (APT, αPT, or α-PT) is a chemical compound of the tryptamine and α-alkyltryptamine families. It is the α-propyl derivative of tryptamine and is a higher homologue of α-methyltryptamine (AMT) and α-ethyltryptamine (AET). The compound was briefly mentioned by Alexander Shulgin in his 1997 book TiHKAL (Tryptamines I Have Known and Loved). He noted that it had been synthesized but that it had never been tested in humans to his knowledge. Moreover, he speculated that it would likely require a "pretty hefty dosage" for central effects based on extrapolation from the loss of potency with higher phenethylamine α-homologation like α-propylphenethylamines such as BDP (K).

== See also ==
- Substituted α-alkyltryptamine
- Indolylpropylaminopentane (IPAP; α,N-DPT)
