= 5-Fluoro-AMT =

Psychedelic drug

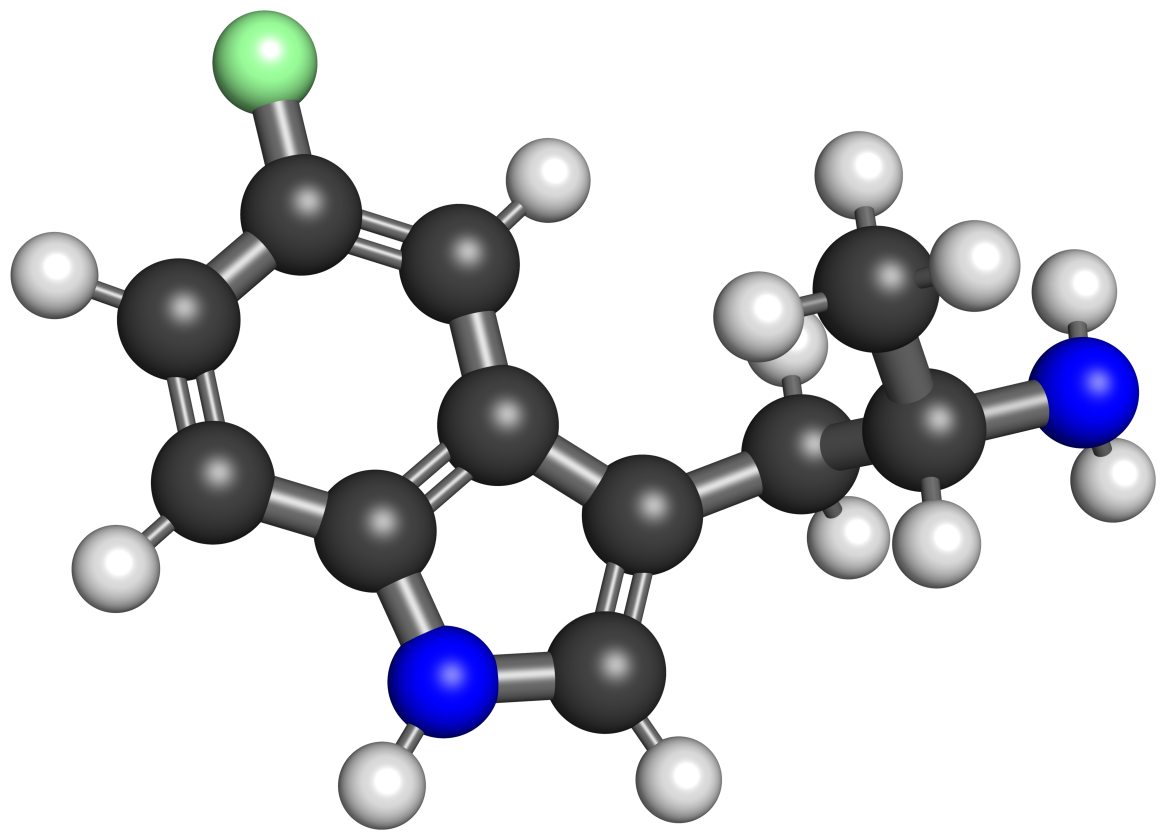

Clinical data
- Other names: 5-Fluoro-α-methyltryptamine; 5-Fluoro-alpha-methyltryptamine; 5-Fluoro-αMT; 5-Fluoro-AMT; 5F-AMT; PAL-212; PAL-544
- Routes of administration: Oral
- Drug class: Serotonin receptor agonist; Serotonin 5-HT_{2A} receptor agonist; Serotonin–norepinephrine–dopamine releasing agent; Serotonergic psychedelic; Hallucinogen; Stimulant; Entactogen
- ATC code: None

Identifiers
- IUPAC name: 1-(5-fluoro-1H-indol-3-yl)propan-2-amine
- CAS Number: 712-08-3
- PubChem CID: 12834
- ChemSpider: 12304
- UNII: P46235ZAP7
- ChEMBL: ChEMBL96816
- CompTox Dashboard (EPA): DTXSID70991512

Chemical and physical data
- Formula: C_{11}H_{13}FN_{2}
- Molar mass: 192.237 g·mol^{−1}
- 3D model (JSmol): Interactive image
- SMILES: Fc1cc2c(cc1)[nH]cc2CC(N)C
- InChI: InChI=1S/C11H13FN2/c1-7(13)4-8-6-14-11-3-2-9(12)5-10(8)11/h2-3,5-7,14H,4,13H2,1H3; Key:CTGFDWBZMCPVED-UHFFFAOYSA-N

5-Fluoro-αMT, also known as 5-fluoro-α-methyltryptamine (5F-AMT) or by its developmental code names PAL-212 and PAL-544, is a monoaminergic drug of the tryptamine and α-alkyltryptamine families related to α-methyltryptamine (αMT). It is taken orally.

The drug is known to act as a serotonin receptor agonist, monoamine releasing agent, and potent monoamine oxidase inhibitor. It produces psychedelic- and stimulant-like effects in animals. 5-Fluoro-AMT is also known to be psychoactive in humans, though its effects have not been well-described.

5-Fluoro-AMT was first described in the scientific literature by 1963. There has been interest in 5-fluoro-AMT as a possible treatment for cocaine dependence.

== Use and effects ==
5-Fluoro-AMT has been said to be psychoactive in humans at a dose of 25 mg orally, although the qualitative nature of these effects has not been well-described. Preclinical studies suggest that 5-fluoro-αMT may be a psychedelic, stimulant, and/or entactogen in humans. However, 5-fluoro-AMT may be dangerous in humans due to its concomitant potent monoamine oxidase inhibition.

William Leonard Pickard has described his experiences with 5-fluoro-AMT, which he had synthesized along with 6-fluoro-AMT, in personal interviews. According to Pickard, 5-fluoro-AMT had a duration of at minimum 9 hours and varied in length significantly. The dose was 25 mg and above. Pickard has said that 5-fluoro-AMT was not a "warm drug" but that he remained favorable to it. Its effects included time dilation among others. He said that it gave him the worst post-trip headaches he'd experienced from any psychedelic and they lasted up to 24 hours.

Pickard has said that 5-fluoro-AMT is less potent and long-lasting than 6-fluoro-AMT. The related drug AMT was one of Pickard's favorite psychedelics, and he said that he took it more than 50 times and experienced no negative side effects with it.

== Pharmacology ==
=== Pharmacodynamics ===
5-Fluoro-AMT has been found to act as a fairly balanced serotonin-norepinephrine-dopamine releasing agent (SNDRA), as a serotonin 5-HT_{2A} receptor agonist, and as a potent and specific MAO-A inhibitor. Its EC_{50} values in terms of monoamine release are 14 to 19 nM for serotonin, 78 to 126 nM for norepinephrine, and 32 to 37 nM for dopamine in rat brain synaptosomes. The drug's EC_{50} at the serotonin 5-HT_{2A} receptor is 8.47 nM and its E_{max} at the receptor is 107%. The IC_{50} of 5-fluoro-AMT for MAO-A is 180 to 450 nM. This is similar to the potency of αMT, para-methoxyamphetamine (PMA), and 4-methylthioamphetamine (4-MTA).

5-Fluoro-αMT induces the head-twitch response, a behavioral proxy of psychedelic-like effects, in rodents. It is also known to reverse reserpine-induced behavioral depression, suggesting that it has antidepressant- or stimulant-like effects as well. 5-Fluoro-AMT does not substitute for cocaine in drug discrimination tests but did substitute for cocaine in monkeys. It does not facilitate intracranial self-stimulation (ICSS) in rodents.

== Chemistry ==
=== Analogues ===
Analogues of 5-fluoro-AMT include 5-fluorotryptamine, 5-fluoro-DMT, 5-fluoro-AET, and BK-5F-NM-AMT, as well as 5-chloro-αMT, 6-fluoro-AMT, 7-chloro-AMT, 7-methyl-αET, 5-API (PAL-571), and flucindole, among others.

BK-5F-NM-AMT, the N-methyl and β-keto derivative of 5-fluoro-AMT, is a serotonin–dopamine releasing agent (SDRA) analogously to 5-fluoro-AMT. In contrast to 5-fluoro-AMT and many other tryptamines however, BK-5F-NM-AMT is inactive as an agonist of serotonin receptors including the 5-HT_{1}, 5-HT_{2}, and 5-HT_{3} receptors and is inactive as a monoamine oxidase inhibitor (MAOI).

== History ==
5-Fluoro-AMT was first described in the scientific literature, by Asher Kalir and Stephen Szara, by 1963, and was described as showing antidepressant- or stimulant-like effects in rodents. It was first tried in humans by 1984. The drug's psychedelic-like effects in animals were described by 1995. 5-Fluoro-AMT's monoamine release and serotonin receptor agonism were shown by 2014, along with support for it having stimulant-like effects in monkeys. The drug was investigated as a possible candidate for treatment of cocaine dependence and these findings were published in 2014.

== Society and culture ==
=== Legal status ===
==== Canada ====
5-Fluoro-AMT is not an explicitly nor implicitly controlled substance in Canada as of 2025.

==== United States ====
5-Fluoro-AMT is not an explicitly controlled substance in the United States. However, it could be considered a controlled substance under the Federal Analogue Act if intended for human consumption.

== See also ==
- Substituted α-alkyltryptamine
