= 3-Methoxymethcathinone =

Designer drug

Clinical data
- Other names: 3-MeOMC; meta-Methoxymethcathinone; m-MeOMC; 3-Methoxy-N-methylcathinone; 3-Methoxy-N-methyl-β-ketoamphetamine; 3-Methoxy-α,N-dimethyl-β-ketophenethylamine
- Drug class: Serotonin–dopamine releasing agent; Serotonin–norepinephrine–dopamine releasing agent; Stimulant

Identifiers
- IUPAC name: 1-(3-methoxyphenyl)-2-(methylamino)propan-1-one
- CAS Number: 882302-56-9
- PubChem CID: 82281626
- ChemSpider: 26702454
- UNII: TAS3L629HH

Chemical and physical data
- Formula: C_{11}H_{15}NO_{2}
- Molar mass: 193.246 g·mol^{−1}
- 3D model (JSmol): Interactive image
- SMILES: CC(C(=O)C1=CC(=CC=C1)OC)NC
- InChI: InChI=1S/C11H15NO2/c1-8(12-2)11(13)9-5-4-6-10(7-9)14-3/h4-8,12H,1-3H3; Key:VAVRRUJYUFACKA-UHFFFAOYSA-N

3-Methoxymethcathinone (3-MeOMC), also known as meta-methoxymethcathinone (m-MeOMC), is a designer drug of the substituted cathinone family described as a stimulant.

Similarly to other cathinones, it acts as a monoamine releasing agent, including of serotonin, dopamine, and norepinephrine. However, in contrast to cathinones and amphetamines, 3-MeOMC appears to show selectivity for induction of serotonin and dopamine release over release of norepinephrine, and hence may act as a partially selective serotonin–dopamine releasing agent (SDRA). Its EC_{50} values are 129 nM for dopamine release and 306 nM for serotonin release in vitro, whereas it only induced 68% release of norepinephrine at a concentration of 10 μM. For comparison, other related cathinones, including cathinone, methcathinone, 3-methylmethcathinone (3-MMC; metaphedrone), 4-methylmethcathinone (4-MMC; mephedrone), and 4-methoxymethcathinone (4-MeOMC; methedrone), induced 94 to 101% release of norepinephrine at 10 μM. However, in another publication, the EC_{50} of 3-MeOMC for induction of norepinephrine release was 111 nM, and hence it did not appear to show selectivity for induction of serotonin and dopamine release relative to norepinephrine, instead acting as a serotonin–norepinephrine–dopamine releasing agent (SNDRA).

3-MeOMC first appeared as an illicit drug after 2014.

== See also ==
- 2-Fluoromethcathinone (2-FMC)
