= 6-(2-Aminopropyl)indole =

Chemical compound

Clinical data
- Routes of administration: Oral
- ATC code: None

Legal status
- Legal status: DE: Uncontrolled; Uncontrolled (but covered under the Federal Analogue Act in the United States and Australia and likely under similar bills in other countries)

Identifiers
- IUPAC name: 1-(1H-Indol-6-yl)propan-2-amine
- CAS Number: 22196-72-1
- PubChem CID: 30999
- ChemSpider: 28759
- UNII: M7C77J017A
- CompTox Dashboard (EPA): DTXSID501030112

Chemical and physical data
- Formula: C_{11}H_{14}N_{2}
- Molar mass: 174.247 g·mol^{−1}
- 3D model (JSmol): Interactive image
- SMILES: C1=C2C(=CC=C1CC(C)N([H])[H])C=C[N]2[H]
- InChI: InChI=1S/C11H14N2/c1-8(12)6-9-2-3-10-4-5-13-11(10)7-9/h2-5,7-8,13H,6,12H2,1H3; Key:QCFIFKAOUKPFPU-UHFFFAOYSA-N

6-(2-Aminopropyl)indole (6-API, 6-IT) is an indole derivative which was first identified being sold on the designer drug market by a laboratory in the Czech Republic in July 2016.

Alexander Shulgin says in his book TiHKAL "From the normal 3-position to the 2, the 4, the 5, the 6 or the 7-positions. All five alpha-methyltryptamine isomers are known, but only one is known to be active in man as a CNS active material. This is the 5-isomer, 5-(2-aminopropyl)indole or 5-IT".

== Pharmacology ==
Studies in dogs have shown the drug to increase hemoglobin levels in the bloodstream.

== Society and culture ==
=== Legal status ===
- 6-API is a positional isomer of αMT, and as such may be covered by the analogue act in the USA (depending on the nature of its psychoactive effect).
- 6-API / 6-IT is illegal in the UK, as it was banned as a temporary class drug in June 2013, along with 9 other related compounds. On March 5, 2014, the UK Home Office announced that 6-API would be made a class B drug on 10 June 2014 alongside every other benzofuran entactogen and many structurally related drugs.
- 6-API is covered by the Australian analogue act as an analogue of MDA "by the replacement of up to 2 carbocyclic or heterocyclic ring structures with different carbocyclic or heterocyclic ring structures"
- 6-API is uncontrolled in Germany, as indole rings are not included as rings under the 2-phenethylamine derived section of the NPsG.

== See also ==
- Substituted amphetamine
- Aminopropylindole
- 6-APB
- 6-APBT
- 6-APDB
