= Copper nanoparticle =

A copper nanoparticle is a copper based particle 1 to 100 nm in size. Like many other forms of nanoparticles, a copper nanoparticle can be prepared by natural processes or through chemical synthesis. These nanoparticles are of particular interest due to their historical application as coloring agents and the biomedical as well as the antimicrobial ones.

== Historical uses ==
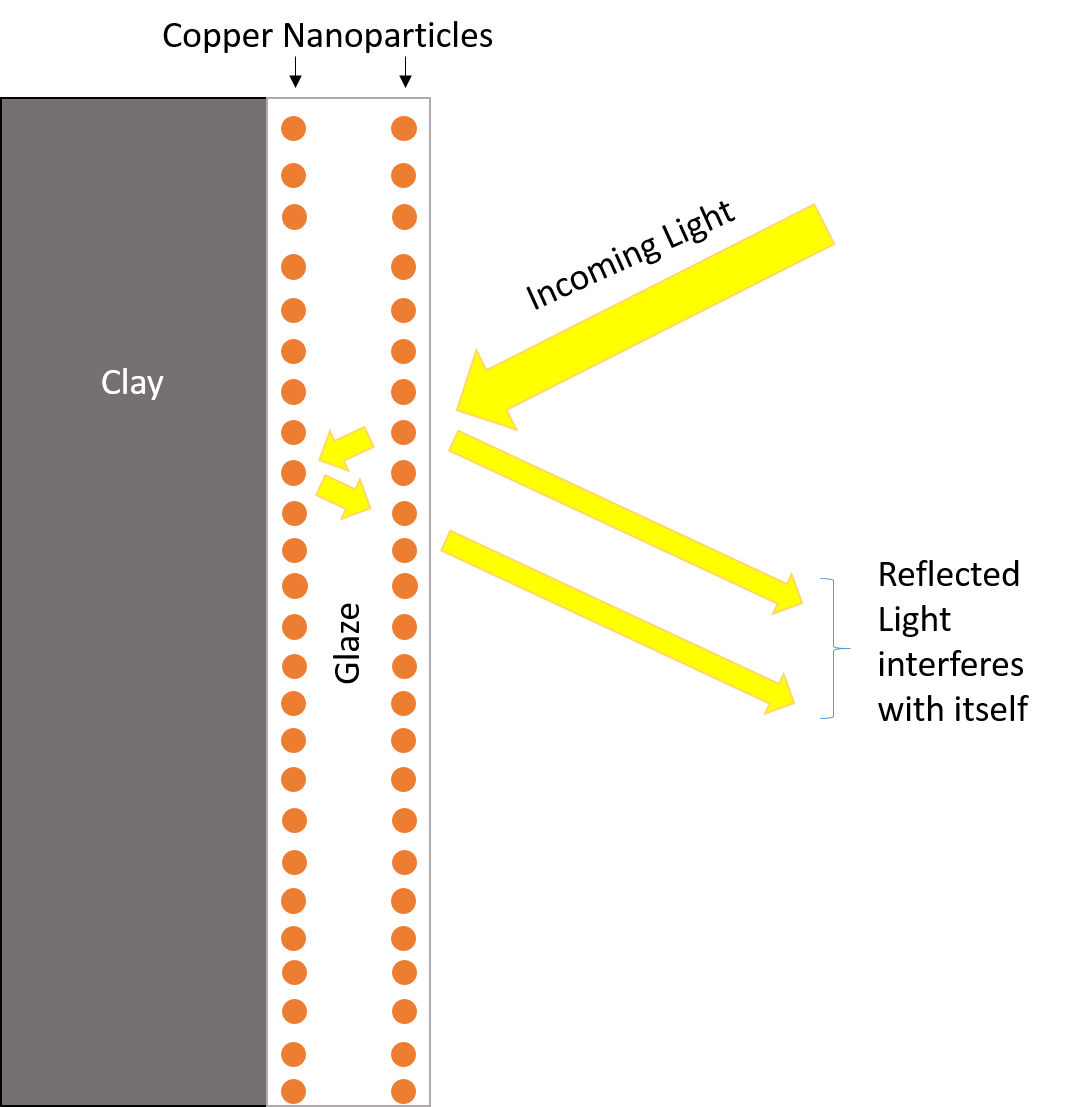
Figure 1: The luster effect is caused by interference effects of light reflecting off two layers of copper nanoparticles in the pottery's glaze.

One of the earliest uses of copper nanoparticles was to color glass and ceramics during the ninth century in Mesopotamia. This was done by creating a glaze with copper and silver salts and applying it to clay pottery. When the pottery was baked at high temperatures in reducing conditions, the metal ions migrated to the outer part of the glaze and were reduced to metals. The result was a double layer of metal nanoparticles with a small amount of glaze in between them. When the finished pottery was exposed to light, the light would penetrate and reflect off the first layer. The light penetrating the first layer would reflect off the second layer of nanoparticles and cause interference effects with light reflecting off the first layer, creating a luster effect that results from both constructive and destructive interference.

== Synthesis ==
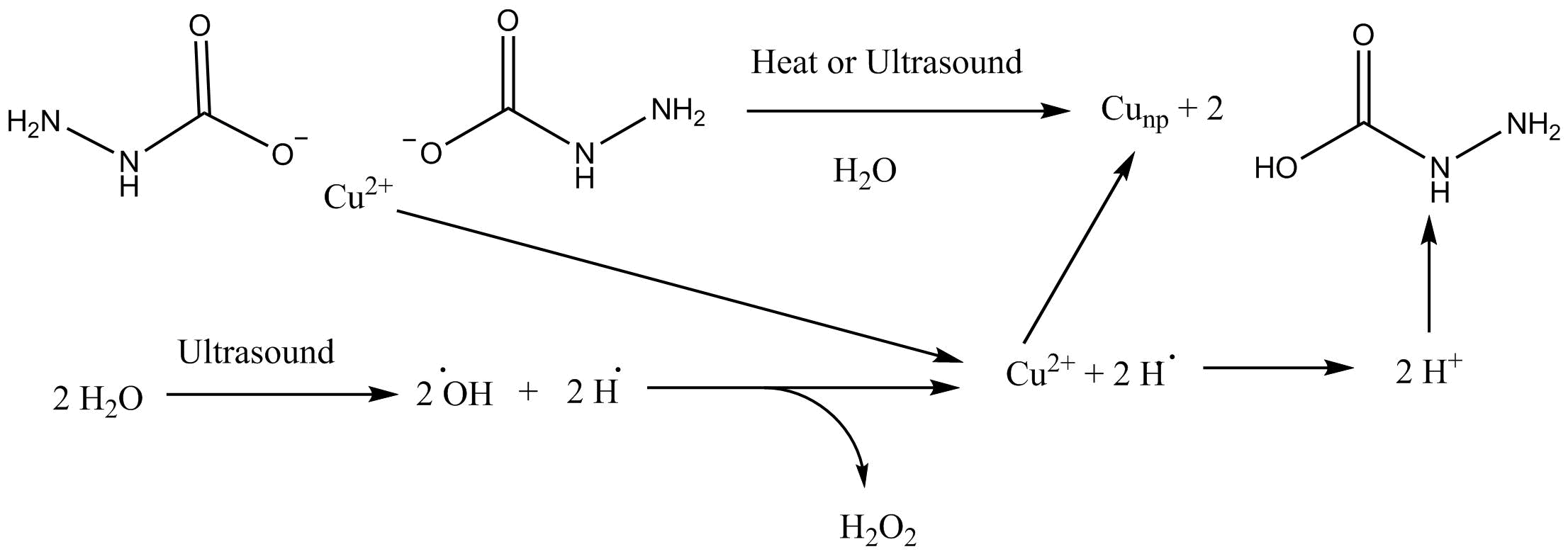
Figure 2: One method of synthesizing copper nanoparticles involves the copper (II) hydrazine carboxylate salt which undergoes a radical reaction with radical hydrogen produced by ultrasounds to form nanoparticles, hydrogen peroxide, and hydrazine carboxylic acid.

Various methods have been described to chemically synthesize copper nanoparticles. An older method involves the reduction of copper hydrazine carboxylate in an aqueous solution using reflux or by heating through ultrasound under an inert argon atmosphere. This results in a combination of copper oxide and pure copper nanoparticle clusters, depending on the method used. A more modern synthesis utilizes copper(II) chloride in a room temperature reaction with sodium citrate or myristic acid in an aqueous solution containing sodium formaldehyde sulfoxylate to obtain a pure copper nanoparticle powder. While these syntheses generate fairly consistent copper nanoparticles, the possibility of controlling the sizes and shapes of copper nanoparticles has also been reported. The reduction of copper(II) acetylacetonate in organic solvent with oleyl amine and oleic acid causes the formation of rod and cube-shaped nanoparticles while variations in reaction temperature affect the size of the synthesized particles.

Another method of synthesis involves using copper (II) hydrazine carboxylate salt with ultrasound or heat in water to generate a radical reaction, as shown in the figure to the right. Copper nanoparticles can also be synthesized using green chemistry to reduce the environmental impact of the reaction. Copper chloride can be reduced using only L-ascorbic acid in a heated aqueous solution to produce stable copper nanoparticles.

== Characteristics ==
Copper nanoparticles display unique characteristics including catalytic and antifungal/antibacterial activities that are not observed in commercial copper. First of all, copper nanoparticles demonstrate a very strong catalytic activity, a property that can be attributed to their large catalytic surface area. With the small size and great porosity, the nanoparticles are able to achieve a higher reaction yield and a shorter reaction time when utilized as reagents in organic and organometallic synthesis. In fact, copper nanoparticles that are used in a condensation reaction of iodobenzene attained about 88% conversion to biphenyl, while the commercial copper exhibited only a conversion of 43%.

Copper nanoparticles that are extremely small and have a high surface to volume ratio can also serve as antifungal/antibacterial agents. The antimicrobial activity is induced by their close interaction with microbial membranes and their metal ions released in solutions. As the nanoparticles oxidize slowly in solutions, cupric ions are released from them and they can create toxic hydroxyl free radicals when the lipid membrane is nearby. Then, the free radicals disassemble lipids in cell membranes through oxidation to degenerate the membranes. As a result, the intracellular substances seep out of cells through the destructed membranes; the cells are no longer able to sustain fundamental biochemical processes. In the end, all these alterations inside of the cell caused by the free radicals lead to cell death.

== Applications ==
Copper nanoparticles with great catalytic activities can be applied to biosensors and electrochemical sensors. Redox reactions utilized in those sensors are generally irreversible and also require high overpotentials (more energy) to run. In fact, the nanoparticles have the ability to make the redox reactions reversible and to lower the overpotentials when applied to the sensors.

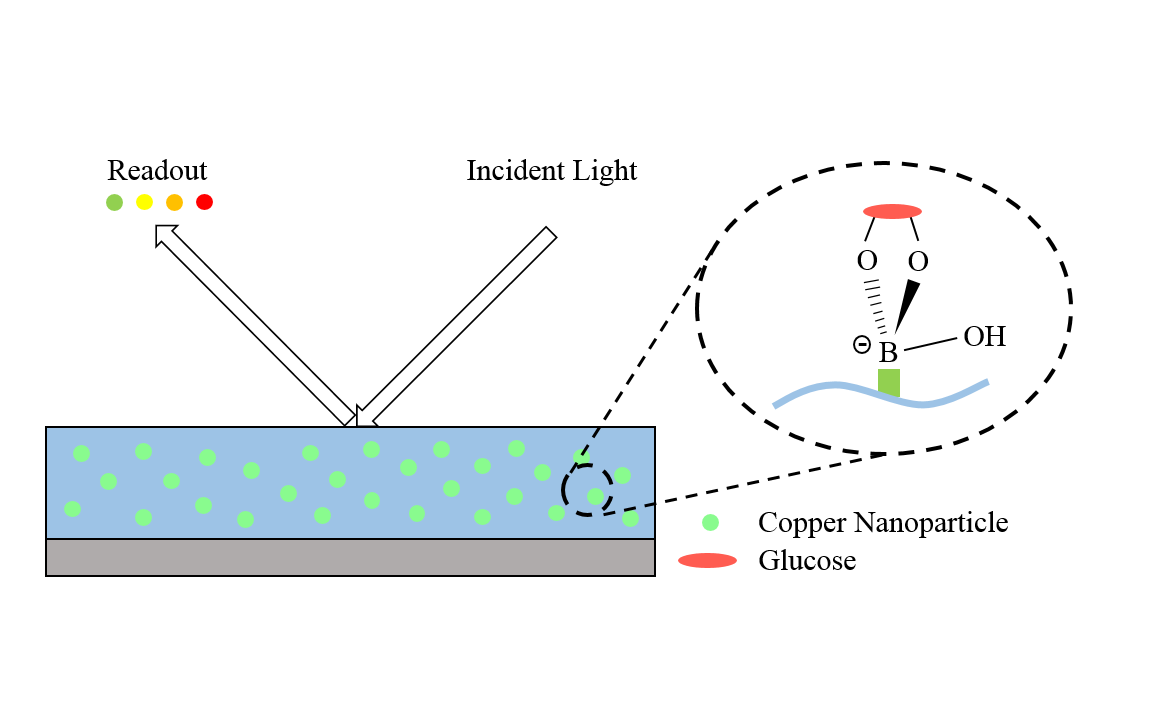
Figure 3: A polyacrylamide hydrogel with copper nanoparticles inside is able to determine glucose levels in a sample added to the gel. As phenylboronic acid groups on the hydrogel polymers bind the glucose molecules, the gel becomes swollen. As a result, the copper nanoparticles move apart, changing how incident light is diffracted by the gel. As the glucose levels decrease, the color of gel changes from red to orange to yellow to green.

One of the examples is a glucose sensor. With the use of copper nanoparticles, the sensor does not require any enzyme and therefore has no need to deal with enzyme degradation and denaturation. As described in Figure 3, depending on the level of glucose, the nanoparticles in the sensor diffract the incident light at a different angle. Consequently, the resulting diffracted light gives a different color based on the level of glucose. In fact, the nanoparticles enable the sensor to be more stable at high temperatures and varying pH, and more resistant to toxic chemicals. Moreover, using nanoparticles, native amino acids can be detected. A copper nanoparticle-plated screen-printed carbon electrode functions as a stable and effective sensing system for all 20 amino acid detection. in situ, green and rapid method can synthesize copper oxide/zinc oxide on cotton fabric by using folic acid to increase the UV-protection properties of the fabric.
