= 5-(2-Aminopropyl)indole =

Chemical compound

Clinical data
- Other names: 5-API; 5-IT; PAL-571; PAL571; Indolylaminopropane; 3,4-Pyrrolo[b]amphetamine
- Routes of administration: Oral
- Drug class: Serotonin–norepinephrine–dopamine releasing agent; Serotonin receptor modulator; Monoamine oxidase inhibitor; Stimulant
- ATC code: None

Legal status
- Legal status: AU: Illegal; CA: Schedule I; DE: Anlage I (Authorized scientific use only); UK: Class B; US: Schedule I (positional isomer); Likely illegal in other countries

Pharmacokinetic data
- Duration of action: 12 hours

Identifiers
- IUPAC name: 1-(1H-indol-5-yl)propan-2-amine
- CAS Number: 3784-30-3
- PubChem CID: 55253543
- ChemSpider: 25991467
- UNII: W98BOE73HH
- CompTox Dashboard (EPA): DTXSID30873562
- ECHA InfoCard: 100.236.959

Chemical and physical data
- Formula: C_{11}H_{14}N_{2}
- Molar mass: 174.247 g·mol^{−1}
- 3D model (JSmol): Interactive image
- SMILES: CC(N)Cc2cc1cc[nH]c1cc2
- InChI: InChI=1S/C11H14N2/c1-8(12)6-9-2-3-11-10(7-9)4-5-13-11/h2-5,7-8,13H,6,12H2,1H3; Key:AULGMISRJWGTBA-UHFFFAOYSA-N

5-(2-Aminopropyl)indole (5-API or 5-IT), also known as 3,4-pyrrolo[b]amphetamine or by the code name PAL-571, is an indole and amphetamine derivative with stimulant effects. Its preparation was first reported by Albert Hofmann in 1962. It is a designer drug that has been openly sold as a recreational drug by online vendors since 2011.

== Use and effects ==
Alexander Shulgin wrote briefly about 5-IT in TiHKAL saying: "at 20 milligrams orally, [it] is a long-lived stimulant producing increased heart-rate, anorexia, diuresis, and slight hyperthermia for about twelve hours." As 5-IT is not a tryptamine and thus not within the scope of the book, it is not discussed in any more detail than this.

The following symptoms can indicate 5-IT has been ingested: hyperthermia, tachycardia, increased blood pressure, dilated pupils (mydriasis), agitation, excessive sweating, jaw clenching, insomnia, disorientation, restlessness, anxiety, and tremor. It is a MAOI, and when combined with a contraindicated substance, it can lead to death.

== Toxicity ==
5-IT has been attributed to 14 deaths of people in Sweden since its discovery. 5-IT was listed as the sole intoxicant in two cases but other drugs were also found in the twelve other post mortem examinations. The 14 deaths occurred between April and July 2012, but a definitive identification of 5-IT in the post-mortem samples was not made until July. All of the dead were young men aged between 20 and 30. Eleven non-fatal poisonings due to 5-IT also reportedly occurred during the same time period.

== Pharmacology ==
=== Pharmacodynamics ===
5-IT acts as a serotonin–norepinephrine–dopamine releasing agent (SNDRA) with EC_{50} values of 12.9 nM for dopamine, 13.3 nM for norepinephrine, and 104.8 nM for serotonin, and is also an MAO-A inhibitor, with an IC_{50} of 200 to 1,600 nM. Additional molecular target data have also been reported for 5-IT, including serotonin receptor interactions.

== Chemistry ==
Although 5-IT is a positional isomer of the tryptamine drug αMT, the compound is not itself a tryptamine as the indole ring is substituted at the 5 position rather than at the 3 position. The compound is closer chemically to phenethylamine derivatives such as 5-APB. This is reflected in the compound's effects when used as a drug, which are reportedly stimulating rather than psychedelic. Along with αMT, it is one of the 7 possible positional isomers of aminopropylindole.

=== Analogues ===
Analogues of 5-API include 6-API, 5-APB, 5-APBT, 5-APDB, αMT (3-API).

== Society and culture ==
=== Legal status ===
- 5-IT is a positional isomer of αMT (a schedule 1 controlled substance in the United States), and as such is possibly considered a schedule 1 controlled substance itself under the Controlled Substances Act.
- 5-IT was banned in the UK as a temporary class drug in June 2013, along with 9 other related compounds. On March 5, 2014, the UK Home Office announced that 5-API would be made a class B drug on 10 June 2014 alongside every other benzofuran entactogen and many structurally related drugs.
- 5-IT is covered by the Australian analogue act as an analogue of MDA "by the replacement of up to 2 carbocyclic or heterocyclic ring structures with different carbocyclic or heterocyclic ring structures".
- A formal application for 5-IT to be made illegal in Sweden was made on July 26, 2012, but did not come into effect immediately.
- 5-IT was made illegal in Denmark on 30 September 2012.
- 5-IT is an Anlage I controlled drug in Germany.
- The European Commission published a proposal for a decision calling upon its member states to take measures to control 5-(2-aminopropyl)indole. It asked member states to introduce control measures and criminal penalties as provided under their national legislation covering psychotropic substances.

== See also ==
- Substituted amphetamine
- Aminopropylindole
