= Α-Methyltryptamine =

Chemical compound

α-Methyltryptamine

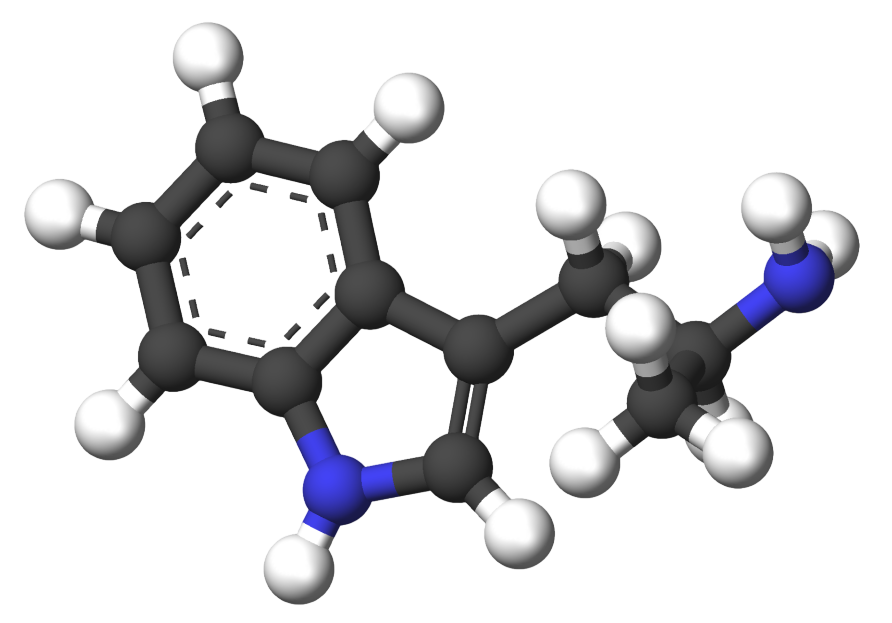

Clinical data
- Trade names: Indopan; Indopane
- Other names: alpha-Methyltryptamine; αMT; α-ET; AMT; IT-290; IT-403 ((+)-αMT); NSC-97069; PAL-17; Ro 3-0926; U-14,164E; U-14,164-E; 3-(2-Aminopropyl)indole; 3-API; 3-IT; α-Methyl-3-indoleethanamine; Metryptamine; Amtryptamine
- Routes of administration: Oral, insufflation, rectal, smoked, IM, IV
- Drug class: Entactogen; Stimulant; Psychedelic; Hallucinogen; Serotonin-norepinephrine-dopamine releasing agent; Serotonin receptor agonist; Monoamine oxidase inhibitor
- ATC code: None

Legal status
- Legal status: AU: S8 (Controlled drug); BR: Class F2 (Prohibited psychotropics); CA: Unscheduled; DE: Anlage I (Authorized scientific use only); UK: Class A; US: Schedule I

Pharmacokinetic data
- Onset of action: 3–4 hours
- Duration of action: 12–24 hours

Identifiers
- IUPAC name: 1-(1H-Indol-3-yl)propan-2-amine
- CAS Number: 299-26-3
- PubChem CID: 9287
- DrugBank: DB01446
- ChemSpider: 8930
- UNII: BIK35ACJ0Q
- KEGG: C20127
- ChEBI: CHEBI:59020
- ChEMBL: ChEMBL30713
- CompTox Dashboard (EPA): DTXSID00861850
- ECHA InfoCard: 100.005.522

Chemical and physical data
- Formula: C_{11}H_{14}N_{2}
- Molar mass: 174.247 g·mol^{−1}
- 3D model (JSmol): Interactive image
- SMILES: NC(CC1=CNC2=C1C=CC=C2)C
- InChI: InChI=1S/C11H14N2/c1-8(12)6-9-7-13-11-5-3-2-4-10(9)11/h2-5,7-8,13H,6,12H2,1H3; Key:QSQQQURBVYWZKJ-UHFFFAOYSA-N

α-Methyltryptamine (αMT, AMT) is a psychedelic, stimulant, and entactogen drug of the tryptamine and α-alkyltryptamine families. It was originally developed as an antidepressant at Upjohn in the 1960s, and was used briefly as an antidepressant in the Soviet Union under the brand name Indopan or Indopane before being discontinued.

Side effects of αMT include agitation, restlessness, confusion, lethargy, pupil dilation, jaw clenching, and rapid heart rate, among others. αMT acts as a releasing agent of serotonin, norepinephrine, and dopamine, as a serotonin receptor agonist, and as a weak monoamine oxidase inhibitor. αMT is a substituted tryptamine and is closely related to α-ethyltryptamine (αET) and other α-alkylated tryptamines.

αMT appears to have first been described by at least 1929. It started being more studied in the late 1950s and was briefly used as an antidepressant in the Soviet Union in the 1960s. The drug started being used recreationally in the 1960s, with use increasing in the 1990s, and cases of death have been reported. αMT is a controlled substance in various countries, including the United States.

== Use and effects ==
Under the brand name Indopan or Indopane, αMT at doses of 5 to 10 mg was used for an antidepressant effect.

At a dose of 20 mg, it produces euphoria, while doses above 30 mg result in strong hallucinogenic effects. At doses over 30 mg, the compound may cause several side effects, including anxiety, muscle tightness, vomiting, and hyperthermia. A dose exceeding 40 mg is generally considered strong. In rare cases or extreme doses, the duration of effects might exceed 24 h. Users report that αMT may be smoked, with doses between and 2 and 20 mg.

A dose of 20 mg of αMT is said to be equivalent to 50 μg of LSD. However, its onset of action is delayed, with effects appearing after only 3 to 4 hours, and it is longer-lasting. In addition, αMT is described as unpleasant compared to LSD, with symptoms of nervousness, irritability, restlessness, and inability to relax.

== Side effects ==
Neurologic side effects of αMT include agitation, restlessness, confusion, and lethargy. Physical manifestations including vomiting, mydriasis (pupillary dilation), jaw clenching, tachycardia, salivation, diaphoresis (sweating), and elevations in blood pressure, temperature, and respiratory rate.

Side effects self-reported by recreational users include anxiety, muscle tension, jaw tightness, pupil dilation, tachycardia, headaches, nausea, and vomiting, as well as psychedelic effects including visual hallucinations and an altered state of mind.

αMT is capable of causing life-threatening side effects including hyperthermia, hypertension, and tachycardia. Fatalities have been reported in association with high doses or concomitant use of other drugs.

Fatalities verified with toxicology and autopsy include those of a 22-year-old man in Miami-Dade County, Florida and a British teenager, both of whom died after consuming 1 g of αMT.

== Pharmacology ==
=== Pharmacodynamics ===
αMT acts as a relatively balanced reuptake inhibitor and releasing agent of the main three monoamines; serotonin, norepinephrine, and dopamine, and as a non-selective serotonin receptor agonist. It has relatively weak psychedelic-like effects in animals compared to other psychedelic substituted tryptamines, for instance in terms of the head-twitch response in rodents.

Activities of αMT and related compounds
Compound	Monoamine release (EC_{50}, nM)			5-HT_{2A} receptor agonism	
Compound	Serotonin	Dopamine	Norepinephrine	EC_{50} (nM)	E_{max} (%)
Tryptamine	33	164	716	7.4	104
Serotonin	44	>10,000	>10,000	ND	ND
DMT	114	>10,000	4,166	38	83
αMT	22–68	79–112	79–180	23	103
αET	23	232	640 (E_{max} = 78%)	>10,000	21
5-MeO-αMT	460	8,900	1,500	2.0–8.4	ND
MDMA	57	376	77	ND	ND
Notes: The smaller the value, the more strongly the compound produces the effect. Refs:

==== Monoamine oxidase inhibition ====
αMT has been shown as a reversible inhibitor of the enzyme monoamine oxidase (MAO) in vitro and in vivo. In rats, the potency of αMT as an MAO-A inhibitor in the brain was approximately equal to that of harmaline at equimolar doses. (Note: MAOI potency was comparable at 7 μM/kg, equivalent to 1.5 mg/kg of Harmaline and 1.2 mg/kg of αMT. At 70 μM/kg αMT was a much less effective MAOI than harmaline.) Dextroamphetamine did not enhance the 5-hydroxytryptophan-induced rise of serotonin at any level. The IC_{50} of αMT for inhibition of MAO-A has been found to be 380 nM. This is similar to that of agents like para-methoxyamphetamine (PMA) and 4-methylthioamphetamine (4-MTA).

==== Serotonergic neurotoxicity ====
A close analogue of αMT, α-ethyltryptamine (αET), is known to be a serotonergic neurotoxin similarly to MDMA and para-chloroamphetamine (PCA).

=== Pharmacokinetics ===
2-Oxo-αMT, 6-hydroxy-αMT, 7-hydroxy-αMT, and 1′-hydroxy-αMT were detected as metabolites of αMT in male Wistar rats.

== Chemistry ==
αMT is a synthetic substituted tryptamine with a methyl substituent at the alpha carbon. This alpha substitution makes it a relatively poor substrate for monoamine oxidase A, thereby prolonging αMT's half-life, allowing it to reach the brain and enter the central nervous system. Its chemical relation to tryptamine is analogous to that of amphetamine to phenethylamine, amphetamine being α-methylphenethylamine. αMT is closely related to the neurotransmitter serotonin (5-hydroxytryptamine) which partially explains its mechanism of action.

=== Synthesis ===
The chemical synthesis of αMT has been described. It's synthesis can be accomplished through several different routes, including via the Henry reaction between indole-3-carboxaldehyde and nitroethane under amine salt or ionic liquid catalysis which produces 1-(3-indolyl)-2-nitropropene-1 which can subsequently be reduced via a reducing agent such as lithium aluminum hydride as described in TiHKAL or NaBH4 with copper nanoparticles. The alternative synthesis is the condensation between indole-3-acetone and hydroxylamine, followed by reduction of the obtained Oxime with lithium aluminum hydride or NaBH4 with copper nanoparticles.

=== Analogues ===
Many analogues of αMT are known, including α-ethyltryptamine (αET), α-propyltryptamine (αPT), 4-methyl-αMT, 5-chloro-αMT (PAL-542), 5-fluoro-αMT (PAL-544), 5-fluoro-αET (PAL-545), 5-methoxy-αMT (5-MeO-αMT), α,N-dimethyltryptamine (α,N-DMT; N-methyl-αMT), α,N,N-trimethyltryptamine (α,N,N-TMT; N-dimethyl-αMT), α-methylserotonin (α-methyl-5-HT; 5-hydroxy-αMT), and indolylpropylaminopentane (IPAP; α,N-dipropyltryptamine or α,N-DPT), among others. Another analogue of αMT is the β-keto and N-methylated derivative BK-NM-AMT.

α-Methyltryptophan, a prodrug of α-methylserotonin, also metabolizes into αMT, but only in small amounts.

There are seven possible positional isomers of aminopropylindole (API; IT), wherein the side chain is located at different positions of the indole ring system. These positional isomers include 1-API (α-methylisotryptamine; isoAMT; PAL-569), 2-API, 3-API (3-IT; α-methyltryptamine; AMT; PAL-17), 4-API, 5-API (5-IT; 3,4-pyrrolo[b]amphetamine; PAL-571), 6-API, and 7-API. 3-API or AMT is an α-alkyltryptamine, 1-API or isoAMT is an isotryptamine, and 4-API, 5-API, 6-API, and 7-API are all phenethylamines and amphetamines.

The analogue of AMT without the benzene part of the indole ring is 3-pyrrolylpropylamine.

== History ==
αMT has been said to have been first synthesized in 1947, alongside α-ethyltryptamine (αET). However, other sources suggest that αMT was first described in the scientific literature by at least 1929. It was specifically described as an antagonist of ergotamine at this time.

αMT started to be more intensively studied, along with αET, in the late 1950s and early 1960s. It was researched by Upjohn (code name U-14,164E) and Sandoz (code name IT-290) as a possible pharmaceutical drug and was simultaneously marketed in the Soviet Union as an antidepressant under the brand name Indopan or Indopane in the 1960s. However, the drug was used clinically for only a short period of time before being withdrawn.

αMT started being used as a recreational drug in the 1960s and use as a designer drug increased in the 1990s. It became a controlled substance in the United States in 2003.

== Society and culture ==
=== Names ===
αMT never received a formal generic name. In the scientific literature, it has been referred to as α-methyltryptamine or alpha-methyltryptamine (abbreviated as α-MT, αMT, or AMT). αMT has also been referred to by developmental code names including IT-290 (Sandoz), NSC-97069, PAL-17, Ro 3-0926, and U-14,164E (Upjohn). In the Soviet Union, the drug was merely referred to by its brand name Indopan or Indopane. Other synonyms of αMT include 3-(2-aminopropyl)indole and 3-IT. (+)-αMT has been referred to by the code name IT-403.

=== Legal status ===
==== Australia ====
The 5-methoxy analogue, 5-MeO-αMT is schedule 9 in Australia and αMT would be controlled as an analogue of this.

==== Austria ====
αMT is placed under Austrian law (NPSG) Group 6.

==== Canada ====
As of 2025 AMT is not an explicitly nor implicitly controlled substance in Canada .

==== China ====
As of October 2025 αMT is a controlled substance in China.

==== Denmark ====
In Denmark (2010), the Danish Minister for the Interior and Health placed αMT to their lists of controlled substances (List B).

==== Finland ====
AMT, alfa-methyltryptamine, is a controlled drug in Finland.

==== Germany ====
αMT is listed under the Narcotics Act in schedule 1 (narcotics not eligible for trade and medical prescriptions) in Germany.

==== Hungary ====
αMT was controlled on the Schedule C list in Hungary in 2013.

==== Lithuania ====
In Lithuania (2012), αMT is controlled as a tryptamine derivative put under control in the 1st list of Narcotic Drugs and Psychotropic Substances which use is prohibited for medical purposes.

==== Slovakia ====
αMT was placed in 2013 on the List of Hazardous Substances in Annex, § 2 in Slovakia.

==== Slovenia ====
αMT appeared on the Decree on Classification of Illicit Drugs in Slovenia (2013).

==== Spain ====
αMT is legal in Spain.

==== Sweden ====
Sveriges riksdags health ministry Statens folkhälsoinstitut classified αMT as "health hazard" under the act Lagen om förbud mot vissa hälsofarliga varor (translated Act on the Prohibition of Certain Goods Dangerous to Health) as of Mar 1, 2005, in their regulation SFS 2005:26 listed as alfa-metyltryptamin (AMT), making it illegal to sell or possess.

==== United Kingdom ====
αMT was made illegal in the United Kingdom as of 7 January 2015, along with 5-MeO-DALT. This was following the events of 10 June 2014 when the Advisory Council on the Misuse of Drugs recommended that αMT be scheduled as a class A drug by updating the blanket ban clause on tryptamines.

==== United States ====
The Drug Enforcement Administration (DEA) placed αMT temporarily in schedule I of the Controlled Substances Act (CSA) on April 4, 2003, pursuant to the temporary scheduling provisions of the CSA (68 FR16427). On September 29, 2004, αMT was permanently controlled as a schedule I substance under the CSA (69FR 58050).

== Research ==
Besides depression, αMT has been studied in people with schizophrenia and other conditions.

== See also ==
- Substituted α-alkyltryptamine
- Aminopropylindole
- List of Russian drugs
