= 5-Chloro-αMT =

Chemical compound

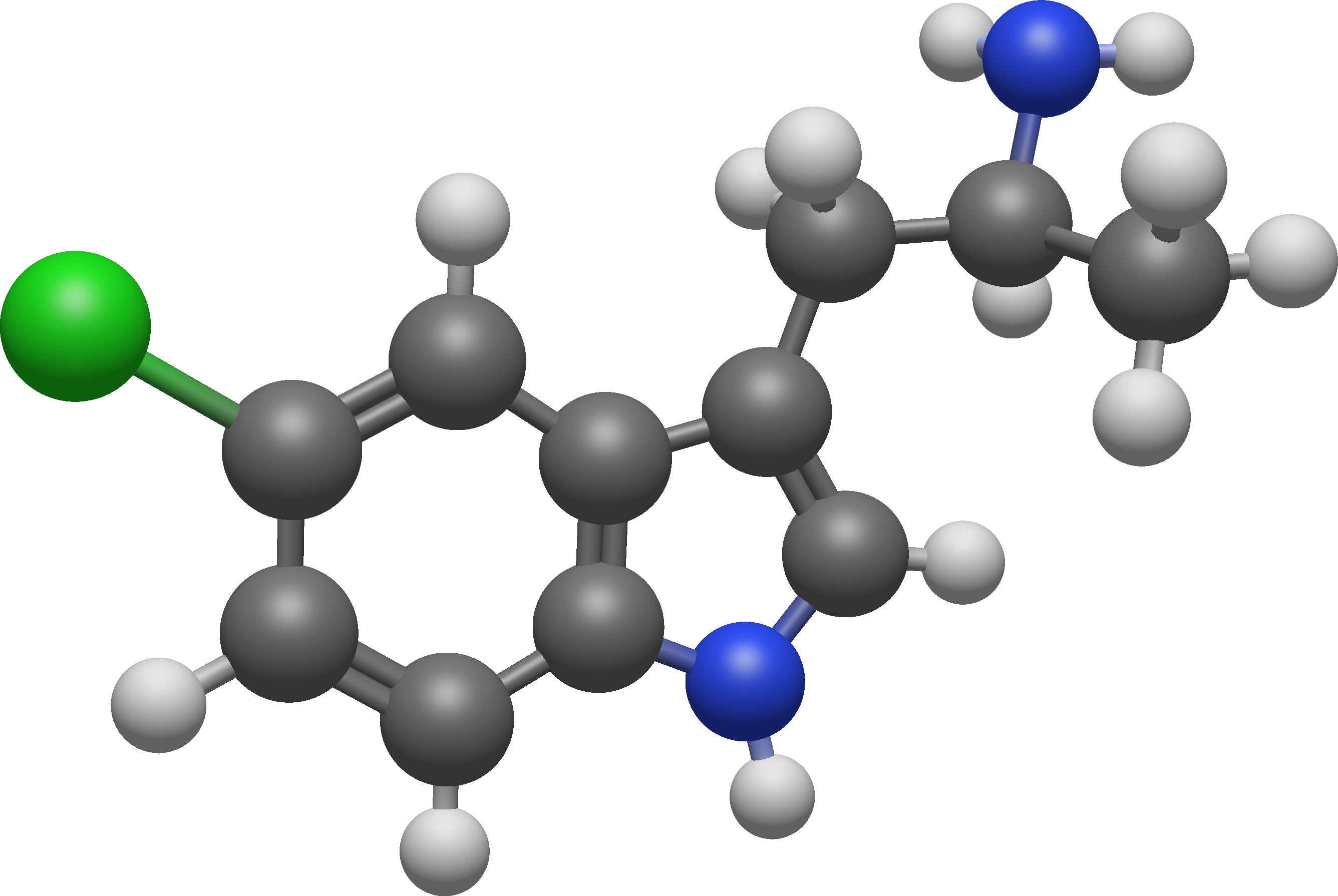

Clinical data
- Other names: 5-Chloro-AMT; 5-Chloro-α-methyltryptamine; 5-Cl-AMT; 5Cl-AMT; PAL-542; PAL542
- Drug class: Serotonin receptor agonist; Serotonin 5-HT_{2A} receptor agonist; Serotonin–dopamine releasing agent; Monoamine oxidase inhibitor Possible serotonergic psychedelic
- ATC code: None

Legal status
- Legal status: UK: Under Psychoactive Substances Act; Illegal in Singapore

Identifiers
- IUPAC name: 1-(5-chloro-1H-indol-3-yl)propan-2-amine
- CAS Number: 712-07-2
- PubChem CID: 12833
- ChemSpider: 12303
- UNII: UZN5KF293Y
- ChEMBL: ChEMBL1906905
- CompTox Dashboard (EPA): DTXSID10991511

Chemical and physical data
- Formula: C_{11}H_{13}ClN_{2}
- Molar mass: 208.69 g·mol^{−1}
- 3D model (JSmol): Interactive image
- SMILES: CC(Cc1c[nH]c2c1cc(cc2)Cl)N
- InChI: InChI=1S/C11H13ClN2/c1-7(13)4-8-6-14-11-3-2-9(12)5-10(8)11/h2-3,5-7,14H,4,13H2,1H3; Key:QMKOQSCXSYPIPB-UHFFFAOYSA-N

5-Chloro-αMT, also known as 5-chloro-α-methyltryptamine or as PAL-542, is a tryptamine derivative related to α-methyltryptamine (αMT) and one of only a few known serotonin–dopamine releasing agents (SDRAs). It is also a potent serotonin 5-HT_{2A} receptor agonist and hence may be a serotonergic psychedelic. The drug has been investigated in animals as a potential treatment for cocaine dependence.

== Pharmacology ==
=== Pharmacodynamics ===
5-Chloro-αMT is a serotonin–dopamine releasing agent (SDRA). The EC_{50} values of 5-chloro-αMT in evoking the in vitro release of serotonin, dopamine, and norepinephrine in rat brain synaptosomes were reported as 16 nM, 54 nM, and 3,434 nM, respectively. It had a norepinephrine:dopamine ratio of 64:1 and a dopamine:serotonin ratio of 3.4:1, indicating that it is a highly specific and fairly well-balanced SDRA.

However, 5-chloro-αMT has also been found to act as a potent full agonist of the serotonin 5-HT_{2A} receptor, with an EC_{50} value of 6.27 nM and a maximal efficacy of 105%. As a serotonin 5-HT_{2A} receptor agonist, 5-chloro-αMT may produce psychedelic effects. Indeed, its close analogue 5-fluoro-αMT produces a strong head-twitch response in rats, a property which is highly correlated with psychedelic effects in humans, and αMT is well-established as a psychedelic drug in humans.

5-Chloro-αMT was found to not reliably produce intracranial self-administration in rats or substitute for cocaine in rats or monkeys in drug discrimination tests. It was found through study of 5-chloro-αMT in rhesus monkeys that norepinephrine release has minimal influence on the misuse potential of monoamine releasing agents (MRAs) and that loss of norepinephrine release activity does not affect efficacy in reducing cocaine self-administration in SDRAs relative to serotonin–norepinephrine–dopamine releasing agents (SNDRAs) such as naphthylisopropylamine (PAL-287). However, SDRAs like 5-chloro-αMT would be expected to produce fewer side effects (including sympathomimetic/cardiovascular effects, insomnia, hyperthermia, and anxiety) relative to SNDRAs, and thus could be better-tolerated in the treatment of cocaine dependence and other conditions.

5-Chloro-αMT is known to be a potent monoamine oxidase inhibitor (MAOI), specifically of monoamine oxidase A (MAO-A). Its IC_{50} values for inhibition of MAO-A and monoamine oxidase B (MAO-B) are 250 nM and 82,000 nM, respectively. Its potency in inhibiting MAO-A is similar to that of para-methoxyamphetamine (PMA). Other related drugs, such as 5-fluoro-α-methyltryptamine (5-fluoro-αMT; PAL-544), are known to be potent MAOIs similarly to 5-chloro-αMT. Potent monoamine oxidase inhibition by MRAs has been associated with dangerous and sometimes fatal toxicity in humans.

α-Ethyltryptamine (αET), an SNDRA and close structural analogue of αMT and 5-chloro-αMT, like many other releasers of both serotonin and dopamine such as MDMA, has been found to produce long-lasting serotonergic neurotoxicity in rats.

== Chemistry ==
=== Analogues ===
Analogues of 5-chloro-AMT include 5-chlorotryptamine, α-methyltryptamine (AMT), 5-fluoro-AMT, 5-fluoro-AET, 5-chloro-AET, 5-chloro-DMT, 5-MeO-AMT, 6-fluoro-AMT, 7-chloro-AMT, among others. It also has structural similarities to 3-chloromethamphetamine (3-CMMA) and 5-Cl-bk-MPA.

== History ==
5-Chloro-AMT was first described in the scientific literature by at least 1963.

== Society and culture ==
=== Recreational use ===
5-Chloro-AMT has been encountered as a novel designer and recreational drug in Slovenia and online in the early 2020s.

== Society and culture ==
=== Legal status ===
==== Canada ====
5-Chloro-AMT is not an explicitly nor implicitly controlled substance in Canada as of 2025.

==== Singapore ====
5-Chloro-AMT is illegal in Singapore.

==== United States ====
5-Chloro-AMT is not an explicitly controlled substance in the United States. However, it could be considered a controlled substance under the Federal Analogue Act if intended for human consumption.

== See also ==
- Substituted α-alkyltryptamine
