= Matthew J. Baggott =

American neuroscientist

- Other name: Matt Baggott
- Education: University of Chicago; University of California, Berkeley
- Occupations: Neuroscientist; Data scientist
- Years active: 1980s–present
- Organization(s): Multidisciplinary Association for Psychedelic Studies (MAPS); Tactogen
- Website: https://mdma.expert/ https://tactogen.com/

Matthew John Baggott is an American neuroscientist who studies entactogens, hallucinogens, and other psychoactive drugs. He is considered to be an expert on MDMA and other entactogens and is an influential figure in the psychedelic medicine movement.

Baggott is co-founder and CEO of Tactogen, a public benefit corporation started in 2020 that is developing novel MDMA-like drugs as medicines. Baggott had previously worked with the Multidisciplinary Association for Psychedelic Studies (MAPS) studying and developing MDMA as a potential medicine. He had also formerly worked in a research lab at the University of California, San Francisco (UCSF) affiliated with Alexander Shulgin and Peyton Jacob III, and became well-acquainted with Shulgin while in the lab. Baggott was involved in the first Food and Drug Administration (FDA)-approved clinical studies of MDMA and MDA. He has been active in scientific research since the 1980s and has been studying MDMA since that time. Baggott was also previously a data scientist and then director of data science and engineering at Genentech. He earned his bachelor's degree from the University of Chicago and his doctorate degree in neuroscience from UCSF.

On January 14, 2022, the Drug Enforcement Agency (DEA) proposed moving five unscheduled and relatively obscure psychedelic tryptamines, including 4-OH-DiPT, 5-MeO-AMT, 5-MeO-MiPT, 5-MeO-DET, and DiPT, into the Schedule I controlled substances category in the United States. Baggott and Tactogen, as well as a large number of other individuals and organizations, publicly challenged and opposed the proposal. On July 22, 2022, under significant pressure, the DEA withdrew the proposal.

== Selected publications ==
- Baggott M, Heifets B, Jones RT, Mendelson J, Sferios E, Zehnder J (November 2000). "Chemical analysis of ecstasy pills". JAMA. 284 (17): 2190. doi:10.1001/jama.284.17.2190 (inactive 1 July 2025). PMID 11056589.
- Lester SJ, Baggott M, Welm S, Schiller NB, Jones RT, Foster E, Mendelson J (December 2000). "Cardiovascular effects of 3,4-methylenedioxymethamphetamine. A double-blind, placebo-controlled trial". Ann Intern Med. 133 (12): 969–973. doi:10.7326/0003-4819-133-12-200012190-00012. PMID 11119398.
- Baggott, Matthew; Jerome, Lisa; Stuart, Reid (1 August 2001), 3,4-Methylenedioxymethamphetamine (MDMA): A Review of the English-Language Scientific and Medical Literature (PDF) (1 ed.), Multidiscplinary Association for Psychedelic Studies
- Baggott, Matthew; Mendelson, John (2001). "Does MDMA Cause Brain Damage?". In Holland, J. (ed.). Ecstasy: The Complete Guide: A Comprehensive Look at the Risks and Benefits of MDMA. Inner Traditions/Bear. pp. 110–145, 396–404. ISBN 978-0-89281-857-0.
- Harris DS, Baggott M, Mendelson JH, Mendelson JE, Jones RT (August 2002). "Subjective and hormonal effects of 3,4-methylenedioxymethamphetamine (MDMA) in humans". Psychopharmacology (Berl). 162 (4): 396–405. doi:10.1007/s00213-002-1131-1. PMID 12172693.
- Baggott, Matthew John (Spring 2010). Other Times I Can Barely See: The Effects of Hallucinogens on Vision and Attention (Doctor of Philosophy in Neuroscience thesis). University of California, Berkeley.
- Baggott MJ, Siegrist JD, Galloway GP, Robertson LC, Coyle JR, Mendelson JE (December 2010). "Investigating the mechanisms of hallucinogen-induced visions using 3,4-methylenedioxyamphetamine (MDA): a randomized controlled trial in humans". PLOS ONE. 5 (12) e14074. Bibcode:2010PLoSO...514074B. doi:10.1371/journal.pone.0014074. PMC 2996283. PMID 21152030.
- Baggott MJ, Kirkpatrick MG, Bedi G, de Wit H (June 2015). "Intimate insight: MDMA changes how people talk about significant others". J Psychopharmacol. 29 (6): 669–677. doi:10.1177/0269881115581962. PMC 4698152. PMID 25922420.
- Baggott MJ, Coyle JR, Siegrist JD, Garrison KJ, Galloway GP, Mendelson JE (April 2016). "Effects of 3,4-methylenedioxymethamphetamine on socioemotional feelings, authenticity, and autobiographical disclosure in healthy volunteers in a controlled setting". J Psychopharmacol. 30 (4): 378–387. doi:10.1177/0269881115626348. PMID 26880224.
- Bershad AK, Miller MA, Baggott MJ, de Wit H (December 2016). "The effects of MDMA on socio-emotional processing: Does MDMA differ from other stimulants?". J Psychopharmacol. 30 (12): 1248–1258. doi:10.1177/0269881116663120. PMC 8753974. PMID 27562198.
- Baggot MJ (2018). "Seed crystal: on the contributions of Alexander Shulgin to the science of consciousness". The Commemorative Edition of Pihkal and Tihkal. Berkeley: Transform Press. pp. 474–482. ISBN 978-0-9630096-6-1. OCLC 1176317484.
- Baggott MJ, Garrison KJ, Coyle JR, Galloway GP, Barnes AJ, Huestis MA, Mendelson JE (2019). "Effects of the Psychedelic Amphetamine MDA (3,4-Methylenedioxyamphetamine) in Healthy Volunteers". J Psychoactive Drugs. 51 (2): 108–117. doi:10.1080/02791072.2019.1593560. PMID 30967099.
- Matthew Baggott (18 June 2023). "Better Than Ecstasy: Progress in Developing a Novel Class of Therapeutic with Matthew Baggott, PhD". YouTube. Tactogen.
- Baggott M (23 June 2023). Beyond Ecstasy: Progress in Developing and Understanding a Novel Class of Therapeutic Medicine. PS2023 [Psychedelic Science 2023, June 19–23, 2023, Denver, Colorado]. Denver, CO: Multidisciplinary Association for Psychedelic Studies. Archived from the original on 17 June 2025. Alt URL
- Baggott, Matthew (September 2023). New Entactogens: Motivations and Progress. Psychedelic Molecules, 4th–5th September 2023, Prague, Czech Republic. Zenodo. doi:10.5281/ZENODO.10475573.
- Baggott, Matthew J. (1 October 2023). "Learning about STP: A Forgotten Psychedelic from the Summer of Love" (PDF). History of Pharmacy and Pharmaceuticals. 65 (1): 93–116. doi:10.3368/hopp.65.1.93. ISSN 2694-3034.
- Johnson CB, Walther D, Baggott MJ, Baker LE, Baumann MH (September 2024). "Novel Benzofuran Derivatives Induce Monoamine Release and Substitute for the Discriminative Stimulus Effects of 3,4-Methylenedioxymethamphetamine". J Pharmacol Exp Ther. 391 (1): 22–29. doi:10.1124/jpet.123.001837. PMC 11413916. PMID 38272669.

== See also ==
- List of psychedelic chemists
