= 5-HT1 receptor =

Transmembrane protein

The 5-HT_{1} receptors are a subfamily of the 5-HT serotonin receptors that bind to the endogenous neurotransmitter serotonin (also known as 5-hydroxytryptamine, or 5-HT). 5-HT_{1} is not a standalone receptor. The 5-HT_{1} subfamily consists of five G protein-coupled receptors (GPCRs) that share 40% to 63% overall sequence homology, including 5-HT_{1A}, 5-HT_{1B}, 5-HT_{1D}, 5-HT_{1E}, and 5-HT_{1F}. Receptors of the 5-HT_{1} type, specifically, the 5-HT_{1A} and 5-HT_{1D} receptor subtypes, are present on the cell bodies. Receptors of the 5-HT1 type, specifically, the 5-HT_{1B} and 5-HT_{1D} receptor subtypes, are also present on the nerve terminals. These receptors are broadly distributed throughout the brain and are recognized to play a significant part in regulating synaptic levels of 5-HT.

The receptor subfamily is coupled to G_{i}/G_{o} and mediates inhibitory neurotransmission by inhibiting the function of adenylate cyclase and modulating downstream ionic effects. This R-coupling to G_{i}/G_{o} proteins leads to a reduction in local concentrations of cAMP, proving that 5-HT_{1} receptors are primarily inhibitory. There is no 5-HT_{1C} receptor, as it was reclassified as the 5-HT_{2C} receptor.

5-HT_{1} is one of seven families that make up the complete subtypes of 5-HT serotonin receptors. It is represented by the number 1, and the five subtypes are represented by letters (e.g., a, b, c, d). Unlike other 5-HT subtype receptors, several 5-HT_{1} subtypes play a role in pain relief from migraine headaches. The interaction between Serotonin agonists, like Triptans, and these subtypes helps relieve migraine pain There has been and continues to be extensive research on 5-HT_{1} and anti-migraine drugs.

For more information, please see the respective main articles of the individual subtypes:

== See also ==
- 5-HT_{2} receptor
- 5-HT_{3} receptor
- 5-HT_{4} receptor
- 5-HT_{5} receptor
- 5-HT_{6} receptor
- 5-HT_{7} receptor
