= C11H13NS =

The molecular formula C_{11}H_{13}NS (molar mass: 191.29 g/mol, exact mass: 191.076871 u) may refer to:

- 2-APBT
- 3-APBT
- 4-APBT
- 5-APBT
- 6-APBT
- 7-APBT
