= Substituted benzothiophene =

Class of chemical compounds

Benzothiophene.

The substituted benzothiophenes are a class of chemical compounds based on benzothiophene. They are closely related to the substituted benzofurans, substituted tryptamines, and to other chemical groups such as the substituted benzodioxoles (or methylenedioxyphenyl compounds).

Substituted benzothiophenes include S-DMT (1-thia-DMT) and the (2-aminopropyl)benzo[β]thiophenes (APBTs) 2-APBT, 3-APBT (1-thia-AMT; SKF-6678), 4-APBT, 5-APBT, 5-MAPBT, 6-APBT, 6-MAPBT, and 7-APBT. These drugs have been found to act as serotonin–norepinephrine–dopamine releasing agents (SNDRAs) and, in some cases, as potent serotonin 5-HT_{2} receptor agonists, analogously to the entactogen MDMA. They do not produce hyperlocomotion in rodents, suggesting that they lack psychostimulant effects. However, those acting as serotonin 5-HT_{2} receptor agonists have been found to induce the head-twitch response, a behavioral proxy of psychedelic effects, in rodents. Some APBTs, such as 5-APBT and 6-APBT, have additionally been found to be potent monoamine oxidase inhibitors (MAOIs), specifically of monoamine oxidase A (MAO-A).

The preceding findings suggest that substituted benzothiophenes may have entactogenic and/or psychedelic effects in humans whilst lacking stimulant effects and possibly having reduced misuse potential. The substituted benzothiophenes have been little-encountered as designer drugs as of 2022.

Tactogen has patented a number of benzothiophenes as novel entactogens for use as potential medicines.

Chemical structures of selected benzothiophenes
S-DMT (1-thia-DMT)

2-APBT

3-APBT (1-thia-AMT)

4-APBT

5-APBT

6-APBT

7-APBT

== See also ==
- Substituted methylenedioxyphenethylamine § Related compounds
- Substituted benzofuran
- Aminopropylindole
- SDA and SDMA
