= DFMDA =

Chemical compound

Clinical data
- Other names: F2-MDA; DiFMDA; Difluoro-MDA; 3,4-(Difluoromethylenedioxy)amphetamine
- Routes of administration: Oral
- Drug class: Monoamine releasing agent; Serotonin releasing agent
- ATC code: None

Legal status
- Legal status: CA: Schedule I; DE: NpSG (Industrial and scientific use only); UK: Class A

Pharmacokinetic data
- Duration of action: Unknown

Identifiers
- IUPAC name: 1-(2,2-difluoro-1,3-benzodioxol-5-yl)propan-2-amine
- CAS Number: 910393-51-0
- PubChem CID: 57467735
- ChemSpider: 26495356
- UNII: 8Q2ANL037S
- CompTox Dashboard (EPA): DTXSID10726729

Chemical and physical data
- Formula: C_{10}H_{11}F_{2}NO_{2}
- Molar mass: 215.200 g·mol^{−1}
- 3D model (JSmol): Interactive image
- SMILES: CC(Cc1ccc2c(c1)OC(O2)(F)F)N
- InChI: InChI=1S/C10H11F2NO2/c1-6(13)4-7-2-3-8-9(5-7)15-10(11,12)14-8/h2-3,5-6H,4,13H2,1H3; Key:BHDXKBALNFHXDV-UHFFFAOYSA-N

DFMDA, also known as F2-MDA or as 3,4-(difluoromethylenedioxy)amphetamine, is a chemical compound of the phenethylamine, amphetamine, and MDxx families related to the entactogen and psychedelic drug MDA. It is the derivative of MDA in which the two hydrogen atoms on the carbon atom of the 3,4-methylenedioxy ring have been replaced with fluorine atoms.

Daniel Trachsel tested DFMDA in humans and found that it was inactive at doses of up to 250 mg orally. Higher doses were not tested. For comparison, he listed MDA's dose as 80 to 160 mg orally.

DFMDA was active at the serotonin transporter (SERT) similarly to MDA and MDMA and with intermediate affinity between the two.

It was developed with the aim of finding a non-neurotoxic drug able to be used as a less harmful substitute for entactogens such as MDMA. Since a major route of the normal metabolism of these compounds is scission of the methylenedioxy ring, producing neurotoxic metabolites such as α-methyldopamine, it was hoped that the difluoromethylenedioxy bioisostere would show increased metabolic stability and less toxicity. These compounds have not yet been tested in animals to verify whether they show similar pharmacological activity to the non-fluorinated parent compounds. It is also now generally accepted that MDMA neurotoxicity results from a variety of different causes and is not solely due to accumulation of α-methyldopamine, making it unclear how much less neurotoxic DFMDA and related drugs would be in practice.

The chemical synthesis of DFMDA has been described. Some notable analogues of DFMDA include DFMDMA (F2-MDMA), EIDA, and IDA, among others. Other fluorinated MDxx derivatives, for instance derivatives of MDEA, BDB, and MBDB, have also been described.

DFMDA was first described in the scientific literature by Daniel Trachsel and colleagues in 2006. He described its properties and effects in humans in 2012 and 2013.

== See also ==
- Substituted methylenedioxyphenethylamine
- d2-MDMA
