= C12H15NS =

The molecular formula C_{12}H_{15}NS (molar mass: 205.32 g/mol) may refer to:

- 5-MAPBT
- 6-MAPBT
- S-DMT
