= DFMDMA =

Clinical data
- Other names: F2-MDMA; DiFMDA; Difluoro-MDMA; 3,4-(Difluoromethylenedioxy)methamphetamine; 3,4-(Difluoromethylenedioxy)-N-methylamphetamine
- Routes of administration: Oral
- ATC code: None

Pharmacokinetic data
- Duration of action: Unknown

Identifiers
- IUPAC name: 1-(2,2-difluoro-2H-1,3-benzodioxol-5-yl)-N-methylpropan-2-amine

Chemical and physical data
- Formula: C_{11}H_{13}F_{2}NO_{2}
- Molar mass: 229.227 g·mol^{−1}
- 3D model (JSmol): Interactive image
- SMILES: CC(NC)CC1=CC(O2)=C(OC2(F)F)C=C1
- InChI: InChI=1S/C11H13F2NO2/c1-7(14-2)5-8-3-4-9-10(6-8)16-11(12,13)15-9/h3-4,6-7,14H,5H2,1-2H3; Key:YZYZCMNVUDUELW-UHFFFAOYSA-N

DFMDMA, also known as F2-MDMA or as 3,4-(difluoromethylenedioxy)methamphetamine, is a chemical compound of the phenethylamine, amphetamine, and MDxx families related to the entactogen MDMA ("ecstasy"). It is the derivative of MDMA in which the two hydrogen atoms on the carbon atom of the 3,4-methylenedioxy ring have been replaced with fluorine atoms.

Daniel Trachsel tested DFMDMA in humans and found that it was inactive at doses of up to 120 mg orally. Higher doses were not tested. For comparison, he listed MDMA's dose as 80 to 150 mg orally.

DFMDMA was of interest as it was thought that the introduction of the fluorine atoms could prevent metabolism at the site of the methylenedioxy ring and might lower formation of neurotoxic metabolites of MDMA like 3,4-dihydroxyamphetamine (HHA; α-methyldopamine). This in turn might improve the tolerability and safety relative to MDMA.

The chemical synthesis of DFMDMA has been described. Some notable analogues of DFMDMA include DFMDA (F2-MDA), EIDA, and IDA, among others. DFMDA was active at the serotonin transporter (SERT) similarly to MDA and MDMA and with intermediate affinity between the two, but was inactive in humans at doses of up to 250 mg orally (whereas MDA is active at 80 to 160 mg orally).

DFMDMA was first described in the scientific literature by Trachsel and colleagues in 2006. He described its properties and effects in humans in 2012 and 2013.

== See also ==
- Substituted methylenedioxyphenethylamine
- d2-MDMA
