= Ethylenedioxy =

Functional group

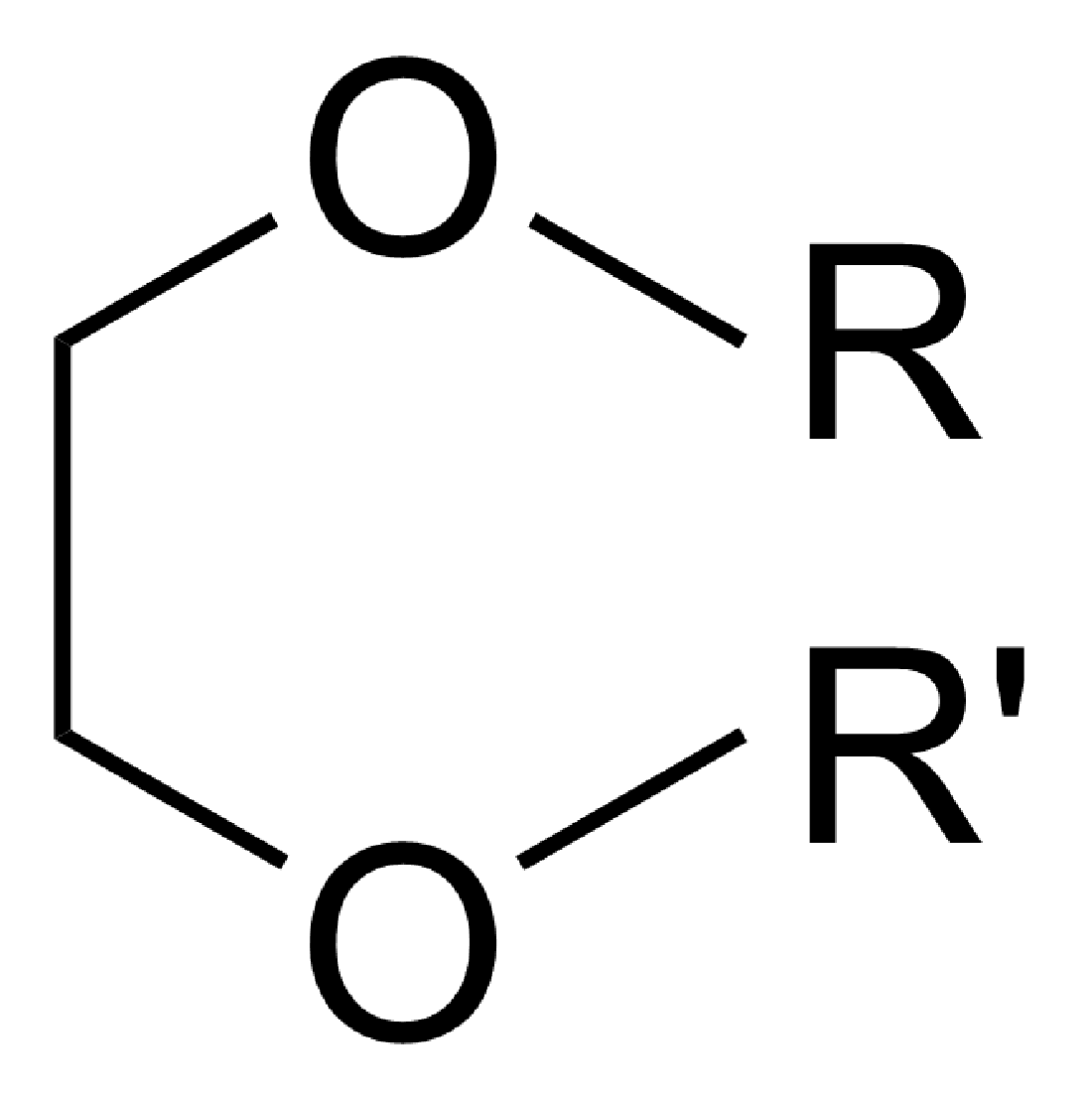
Ethylenedioxy chemical structure.

In organic chemistry, ethylenedioxy is a functional group with the structural formula R−O−CH_{2}−CH_{2}−O−R'. It is often attached to an aromatic ring.

Examples:

- 3,4-Ethylenedioxythiophene, a precursor to conductive polymer
- 3,4-Ethylenedioxy-N-methylamphetamine, an analogue of MDMA with similar effects.
- (ethylenedioxy)dimethanol (OHCH_{2}−O−C_{2}H_{4}−O−CH_{2}OH), a biocidal formaldehyde releaser.

== See also ==
- 1,4-Benzodioxan
- 1,4-Benzodioxine
