= Benzodioxine =

Benzodioxine may refer to:

- 1,2-Benzodioxine
- 1,3-Benzodioxine
- 1,4-Benzodioxine
- 2,3-Benzodioxine
