= EDMA =

Chemical compound

Clinical data
- Other names: 3,4-Ethylenedioxy-N-methylamphetamine; EDMA; MDMC
- Routes of administration: Oral
- Drug class: Psychoactive drug
- ATC code: None

Legal status
- Legal status: CA: Schedule III; DE: NpSG (Industrial and scientific use only); UK: Class B

Pharmacokinetic data
- Duration of action: 3–5 hours

Identifiers
- IUPAC name: 1-(2,3-dihydro-1,4-benzodioxin-6-yl)-N-methylpropan-2-amine
- CAS Number: 133787-66-3
- PubChem CID: 24257269
- ChemSpider: 23553090
- UNII: UJ7UU2C6E6
- CompTox Dashboard (EPA): DTXSID501027143

Chemical and physical data
- Formula: C_{12}H_{17}NO_{2}
- Molar mass: 207.273 g·mol^{−1}
- 3D model (JSmol): Interactive image
- SMILES: CC(Cc1ccc2c(c1)OCCO2)NC
- InChI: InChI=1S/C12H17NO2/c1-9(13-2)7-10-3-4-11-12(8-10)15-6-5-14-11/h3-4,8-9,13H,5-7H2,1-2H3; Key:UJKWLAZYSLJTKA-UHFFFAOYSA-N

EDMA, also known as 3,4-ethylenedioxy-N-methylamphetamine or as MDMC, is a psychoactive drug of the phenethylamine, amphetamine, and EDxx families. It is an analogue of MDMA where the methylenedioxy ring has been replaced by an ethylenedioxy ring.

== Pharmacology ==
It has been found that EDMA acts as a non-neurotoxic serotonin releasing agent with moderately diminished potency relative to MDMA, and with negligible effects on dopamine release. However, subsequent research found that EMDA is a serotonin–norepinephrine–dopamine releasing agent (SNDRA) with EC_{50} values of 117 nM for serotonin release, 325 nM for norepinephrine release, and 597 nM for dopamine release in rat brain synaptosomes. Compared to MDMA, EDMA was about half as potent as a serotonin releaser, 4.5-fold less potent as a norepinephrine releaser, and 8-fold less potent as a dopamine releaser. The activities of the individual enantiomers of EDMA have also been assessed.

In his book PiHKAL (Phenethylamines I Have Known and Loved), the dose is listed as 150 to 250 mg orally and the duration as 3 to 5 hours. According to Shulgin, EDMA produces only mild effects that included paresthesia, nystagmus, a dozing state, hypnogogic imagery, and colored letters in the peripheral visual field.

== Society and culture ==
While commonly referred to as EDMA, Shulgin refers to this compound as both MDMC and EDMA in PiHKAL, calling the former a "Shulgin pet name" for the compound, and stating that the name "doesn't really make sense". MDMC commonly refers to a different analogue of MDMA, methylone.

== Chemistry ==
The chemical synthesis of EDMA has been described.

== See also ==
- Substituted ethylenedioxyphenethylamine
- 3,4-Ethylenedioxyamphetamine (EDA)
- 3,4-Ethylenedioxymethcathinone (EDMC)
- 3,4-Ethylidenedioxyamphetamine (EIDA)
- 3,4-Isopropylidenedioxyamphetamine (IDA)
