= Dirty Picture (disambiguation) =

"Dirty Picture" is a 2010 song by Taio Cruz.

Dirty Picture(s) may also refer to:

== Films ==
- The Dirty Picture, a 2011 Hindi film
- Dirty Picture: Silk Sakkath Maga, a 2013 Indian film by Trishul
- Dirty Pictures (1971 film) or Oasis of Fear, a 1971 Italian giallo film
- Dirty Pictures, a 2000 television film about the 1990 Robert Mapplethorpe case
- Dirty Pictures (2010 documentary), a 2010 film about Alexander Shulgin

== Other uses ==
- "Dirty Picture", a song by S. Thaman, Usha Uthup, and Simha from the 2016 Indian film Thikka

== See also ==
- Dirty Films, an Australian film production company
