= SDA (drug) =

Clinical data
- Other names: 3-Thio-MDA; 3T-MDA; 3,4-Methylenethiooxyamphetamine
- Drug class: Serotonin–norepinephrine–dopamine releasing agent; Serotonin 5-HT_{2} receptor agonist; Entactogen; Stimulant; Serotonergic psychedelic; Hallucinogen
- ATC code: None

Identifiers
- IUPAC name: 1-(1,3-benzoxathiol-5-yl)propan-2-amine
- PubChem CID: 117285706
- ChemSpider: 61970175

Chemical and physical data
- Formula: C_{10}H_{13}NOS
- Molar mass: 195.28 g·mol^{−1}
- 3D model (JSmol): Interactive image
- SMILES: CC(CC1=CC2=C(C=C1)OCS2)N
- InChI: InChI=1S/C10H13NOS/c1-7(11)4-8-2-3-9-10(5-8)13-6-12-9/h2-3,5,7H,4,6,11H2,1H3; Key:OXGJJEZWSWXUNB-UHFFFAOYSA-N

SDA, also known as 3,4-methylenethiooxyamphetamine (3T-MDA), is a putative entactogen and psychedelic drug of the phenethylamine and amphetamine families related to 3,4-methylenedioxyamphetamine (MDA). It is the analogue of MDA in which the oxygen atom at the 3 position within the 3,4-methylenedioxy substitution has been replaced with a sulfur atom to give a 1,3-benzoxathiole rather than 1,3-benzodioxole ring system. The drug is also the N-desmethyl analogue of 3,4-methylenethiooxy-N-methylamphetamine (SDMA; 3T-MDMA).

== Pharmacology ==
=== Pharmacodynamics ===
Similarly to MDA, SDA is a serotonin–norepinephrine–dopamine releasing agent (SNDRA) and a non-selective serotonin 5-HT_{2} receptor agonist. However, SDA was 16-fold more potent as a serotonin releaser, 16-fold more potent as a dopamine releaser, and 2-fold more potent as a norepinephrine releaser than MDA in HEK293 cells in vitro. In addition, it was 2- to 3-fold more potent as an agonist of the serotonin 5-HT_{2A}, 5-HT_{2B}, and 5-HT_{2C} receptors than MDA. SDA had largely similar activational efficacies at the serotonin 5-HT_{2} receptors as MDA. Due to its greater potency as a monoamine releasing agent, SDA may be active at lower doses or concentrations than MDA.

SDA produced hyperlocomotion and hyperthermia in rodents and to a greater extent than SDMA or MDMA. However, SDA did not produce significant rewarding effects in the conditioned place preference (CPP) paradigm unlike MDMA but similarly to SDMA. Hence, SDA might have reduced misuse potential compared to other related drugs like MDMA. Similarly to findings with MDA, SDA produced the head-twitch response, a behavioral proxy of psychedelic effects, in rodents, and hence may produce hallucinogenic effects in humans. Unlike SDMA and MDMA, SDA produced thigmotaxis in the open field test, an anxiety-like effect. SDA may be cardiotoxic due to serotonin 5-HT_{2B} receptor agonism.

=== Pharmacokinetics ===
The metabolism and metabolites of SDA have been studied. It showed more rapid clearance than MDA in rodents and hence may have a shorter elimination half-life and/or duration.

== Chemistry ==
=== Synthesis ===
The chemical synthesis of SDA has been described.

=== Analogues ===
A notable analogue of SDA is 4T-MMDA-2 (2-methoxy-4T-MDA), which was described by Alexander Shulgin in his book PiHKAL (Phenethylamines I Have Known and Loved). Other analogues of SDA include SDMA, MDA, MDMA, 5-APB, 5-APDB, and 6-APBT, among others.

== History ==
SDA was first mentioned in the scientific literature by 2013, but was only conceptually described at this time. Subsequently, its synthesis and preclinical pharmacology were described by Nina Kastner and colleagues including Matthias Grill at MiHKAL in 2025. Prodrugs of SDA and/or related compounds have also been described.

== See also ==
- Substituted methylenedioxyphenethylamine § Related compounds
- List of investigational hallucinogens and entactogens
