= 4-APBT =

Clinical data
- Other names: 4-(2-Aminopropyl)-1-benzothiophene
- Drug class: Serotonin–norepinephrine–dopamine releasing agent

Identifiers
- IUPAC name: 1-(1-benzothiophen-4-yl)propan-2-amine

Chemical and physical data
- Formula: C_{11}H_{13}NS
- Molar mass: 191.29 g·mol^{−1}
- 3D model (JSmol): Interactive image
- SMILES: CC(Cc1cccc2c1ccs2)N
- InChI: InChI=1S/C11H13NS/c1-8(12)7-9-3-2-4-11-10(9)5-6-13-11/h2-6,8H,7,12H2,1H3; Key:NKOJSEHZOSSUEN-UHFFFAOYSA-N

4-APBT, also known as 4-(2-aminopropyl)-1-benzothiophene, is a monoamine releasing agent (MRA) of the amphetamine and benzothiophene families. It acts specifically as a fairly well-balanced serotonin–norepinephrine–dopamine releasing agent (SNDRA), with EC_{50} values of 21.2 nM for serotonin, 46.2 nM for norepinephrine, and 66.6 nM for dopamine in rat brain synaptosomes. 4-APBT was first described in the scientific literature by 2020.

== See also ==
- Substituted benzothiophene
- 5-APBT
- 6-APBT
- 7-APBT
