= SDMA (drug) =

Clinical data
- Other names: 3-Thio-MDMA; 3T-MDMA; MY100; MY-100; 3,4-Methylenethiooxy-N-methylamphetamine
- Drug class: Serotonin–norepinephrine–dopamine releasing agent; Serotonin 5-HT_{2} receptor agonist; Entactogen; Stimulant
- ATC code: None

Pharmacokinetic data
- Metabolites: SDA

Identifiers
- IUPAC name: 1-(1,3-benzoxathiol-5-yl)-N-methylpropan-2-amine
- PubChem CID: 169291098

Chemical and physical data
- Formula: C_{11}H_{15}NOS
- Molar mass: 209.31 g·mol^{−1}
- 3D model (JSmol): Interactive image
- SMILES: CC(CC1=CC2=C(C=C1)OCS2)NC
- InChI: InChI=1S/C11H15NOS/c1-8(12-2)5-9-3-4-10-11(6-9)14-7-13-10/h3-4,6,8,12H,5,7H2,1-2H3; Key:FCMBKJAWTSTFFR-UHFFFAOYSA-N

SDMA, also known as 3,4-methylenethiooxy-N-methylamphetamine (3T-MDMA) or as MY100, is a putative entactogen of the phenethylamine and amphetamine families related to 3,4-methylenedioxy-N-methylamphetamine (MDMA). It is the analogue of MDMA in which the oxygen atom at the 3 position within the 3,4-methylenedioxy substitution has been replaced with a sulfur atom to give a 1,3-benzoxathiole rather than 1,3-benzodioxole ring system. The drug is also the N-methyl derivative of 3,4-methylenethiooxyamphetamine (SDA; 3T-MDA). SDMA is of interest for potential therapeutic use.

== Pharmacology ==
=== Pharmacodynamics ===
Similarly to MDMA, SDMA is a serotonin–norepinephrine–dopamine releasing agent (SNDRA) and a non-selective serotonin 5-HT_{2} receptor agonist. However, SDMA was 11-fold more potent as a serotonin releaser, 19-fold more potent as a dopamine releaser, and 2-fold more potent as a norepinephrine releaser than MDMA in HEK293 cells in vitro. In addition, it was about twice as potent as a serotonin 5-HT_{2A} receptor agonist, whereas it showed similar agonistic potency as MDMA at the serotonin 5-HT_{2B} and 5-HT_{2C} receptors. SDMA had similar activational efficacies at the serotonin 5-HT_{2} receptors as MDMA. Due to its greater potency as a monoamine releasing agent, SDMA may be active at lower doses or concentrations than MDMA.

SDMA produced hyperlocomotion and hyperthermia in rodents with similar profiles as MDMA. However, SDMA did not produce rewarding effects in the conditioned place preference (CPP) paradigm unlike MDMA. Hence, SDMA might have reduced misuse potential compared to MDMA. As with MDMA, SDMA did not produce the head-twitch response, a behavioral proxy of psychedelic effects, in rodents, and hence may not produce hallucinogenic effects in humans. SDMA might be less cardiotoxic than MDMA due to having much greater monoamine-releasing potency but unaltered serotonin 5-HT_{2B} receptor agonistic potency.

=== Pharmacokinetics ===
The metabolism and metabolites of SDMA have been studied. It showed more rapid clearance than MDMA in rodents and hence may have a shorter elimination half-life and/or duration.

== Chemistry ==
=== Synthesis ===
The chemical synthesis of SDMA has been described.

=== Analogues ===
A notable analogue of SDMA is 4T-MMDA-2 (2-methoxy-4T-MDA), which was described by Alexander Shulgin in his book PiHKAL (Phenethylamines I Have Known and Loved). Other analogues of SDMA include SDA, MDMA, 5-MAPB, and 6-MAPBT, among others.

== History ==
SDMA was first mentioned in the scientific literature by 2013, but was only conceptually described at this time. Subsequently, its synthesis and preclinical pharmacology were described by Nina Kastner and colleagues including Matthias Grill at MiHKAL in 2025. In addition, SDMA was patented by Mydecine as a shorter-acting MDMA alternative in 2023. Prodrugs of SDMA and/or related compounds have also been described. The drug is of interest for potential therapeutic use, for instance treatment of post-traumatic stress disorder (PTSD).

== See also ==
- Substituted methylenedioxyphenethylamine § Related compounds
- List of investigational hallucinogens and entactogens
