= 3,4-Ethylidenedioxyamphetamine =

Chemical compound

EIDA

Clinical data
- Other names: EIDA
- ATC code: None

Legal status
- Legal status: CA: Schedule I; DE: NpSG (Industrial and scientific use only); UK: Class A

Identifiers
- IUPAC name: 1-(2-Methyl-1,3-benzodioxol-5-yl)propan-2-amine
- CAS Number: 125299-84-5
- PubChem CID: 130542
- ChemSpider: 115478
- UNII: T927DM865T
- CompTox Dashboard (EPA): DTXSID401029691

Chemical and physical data
- Formula: C_{11}H_{15}NO_{2}
- Molar mass: 193.246 g·mol^{−1}
- 3D model (JSmol): Interactive image
- SMILES: CC(N)Cc2ccc1OC(C)Oc1c2
- InChI: InChI=1S/C11H15NO2/c1-7(12)5-9-3-4-10-11(6-9)14-8(2)13-10/h3-4,6-8H,5,12H2,1-2H3; Key:SLXACJFRFCJPAH-UHFFFAOYSA-N

3,4-Ethylidenedioxyamphetamine (EIDA) is a substituted derivative of 3,4-methylenedioxyamphetamine (MDA), which was developed by David E. Nichols and coworkers, in the course of research to determine the bulk tolerance around the benzodioxole portion of the MDA molecule. EIDA was found to produce similar effects to MDA in animals but with less than half the potency, while the isopropylidenedioxy derivative (IPIDA, IDA) did not substitute for MDA and instead had sedative and convulsant effects. This shows limited bulk tolerance at this position and (as with 2C-G-5) makes it likely the activity of EIDA will reside primarily in one enantiomer, although only the racemic mix has been studied as yet.

== See also ==
- Substituted methylenedioxyphenethylamine
- 3,4-Isopropylidenedioxyamphetamine (IDA)
- F-2 (psychedelic)
- 3,4-Ethylenedioxyamphetamine (EIDA)
- 3,4-Ethylenedioxymethamphetamine (EDMA)
- 3,4-Ethylenedioxymethcathinone (EDMC)
- DFMDA, DFMDMA, and d2-MDMA
