= Indolizinylethylamine =

Indolizinylethylamines are a group of indolizine derivatives closely related to the tryptamines (indolylethylamines). They include 2ZEDMA, 1ZP2MA, and 1Z2MAP1O. Indolizinylethylamines are known to act as non-hallucinogenic serotonin receptor agonists and as monoamine releasing agents.

Chemical structures of selected indolizinylethylamines
2ZEDMA

1ZP2MA

1Z2MAP1O

== See also ==
- Substituted tryptamine § Related compounds
- Indazolethylamine
- Tetrahydropyridinylpyrrolopyridine
