= 7-APBT =

Clinical data
- Drug class: Serotonin–norepinephrine–dopamine releasing agent

Identifiers
- IUPAC name: 1-(1-benzothiophen-7-yl)propan-2-amine
- PubChem CID: 81148228
- ChemSpider: 36641702

Chemical and physical data
- Formula: C_{11}H_{13}NS
- Molar mass: 191.29 g·mol^{−1}
- 3D model (JSmol): Interactive image
- SMILES: CC(CC1=CC=CC2=C1SC=C2)N
- InChI: InChI=1S/C11H13NS/c1-8(12)7-10-4-2-3-9-5-6-13-11(9)10/h2-6,8H,7,12H2,1H3; Key:WQPFTMBQNOUDIL-UHFFFAOYSA-N

7-APBT is a monoamine releasing agent (MRA) of the amphetamine and benzothiophene families. It acts specifically as a fairly well-balanced serotonin–norepinephrine–dopamine releasing agent (SNDRA), with EC_{50} values of 36.9 nM for serotonin, 28.5 nM for norepinephrine, and 16.8 nM for dopamine in rat brain synaptosomes. 7-APBT was first described in the scientific literature by 2020.

== See also ==
- Substituted benzothiophene
- 4-APBT
- 5-APBT
- 6-APBT
