= MTDA =

Clinical data
- Other names: MPDA; 3-Methoxy-4,5-trimethylenedioxyamphetamine; 5-Methoxy-3,4-trimethylenedioxyamphetamine; 5-Methoxy-TDA; 5-MeO-TDA
- ATC code: None

Identifiers
- IUPAC name: 1-(6-methoxy-3,4-dihydro-2H-1,5-benzodioxepin-8-yl)propan-2-amine
- PubChem CID: 170864921

Chemical and physical data
- Formula: C_{13}H_{19}NO_{3}
- Molar mass: 237.299 g·mol^{−1}
- 3D model (JSmol): Interactive image
- SMILES: CC(CC1=CC2=C(C(=C1)OC)OCCCO2)N
- InChI: InChI=1S/C13H19NO3/c1-9(14)6-10-7-11(15-2)13-12(8-10)16-4-3-5-17-13/h7-9H,3-6,14H2,1-2H3; Key:XCXNZPQOBJFUIH-UHFFFAOYSA-N

MTDA, or MPDA, also known as 3-methoxy-4,5-trimethylenedioxyamphetamine or as 5-methoxy-TDA, is a chemical compound of the phenethylamine and amphetamine families related to the MDxx compounds like MDMA and the EDxx compounds like EDMA. It is the 5-methoxy derivative of 3,4-trimethylenedioxyamphetamine (TDA) and the analogue of MMDA (5-methoxy-MDA) and MEDA (5-methoxy-EDA) in which the 3,4-alkylenedioxy ring is a further-expanded 3,4-trimethylenedioxy ring. It was synthesized, tested, and described by Alexander Shulgin in his 1991 book PiHKAL (Phenethylamines I Have Known and Loved). He tested it at doses of up to 8 mg orally and observed no activity. He did not expect any activity and did not test higher doses before abandoning it, due to it being "not an interesting compound". MTDA was first described in the scientific literature by Shulgin by 1964.

== See also ==
- Substituted phenethylamine
- Substituted ethylenedioxyphenethylamine
- MEDA (5-methoxy-EDA)
