= D2-MDMA =

d2-MDMA

Clinical data
- Other names: Deuterated-MDMA; D-MDMA; d2-3,4-Methylenedioxymethamphetamine; Deumidomafetamine; d2-Midomafetamine
- Drug class: Entactogen; Stimulant
- ATC code: None

Identifiers
- IUPAC name: 1-(2,2-dideuterio-1,3-benzodioxol-5-yl)-N-methylpropan-2-amine
- PubChem CID: 13909086

Chemical and physical data
- Formula: C_{11}H_{15}NO_{2}
- Molar mass: 193.246 g·mol^{−1}
- 3D model (JSmol): Interactive image
- SMILES: [2H]C1(OC2=C(O1)C=C(C=C2)CC(C)NC)[2H]
- InChI: InChI=1S/C11H15NO2/c1-8(12-2)5-9-3-4-10-11(6-9)14-7-13-10/h3-4,6,8,12H,5,7H2,1-2H3/i7D2; Key:SHXWCVYOXRDMCX-RJSZUWSASA-N

d2-MDMA, also known as d2-3,4-methylenedioxymethamphetamine or as deuterated-MDMA (D-MDMA), is an entactogen and stimulant of the phenethylamine, amphetamine, and MDxx families related to MDMA ("ecstasy"). It is the deuterated isotopologue of MDMA in which the hydrogen atoms on the carbon atom of the 3,4-methylenedioxy ring have been replaced with the deuterium isotopes.

MDMA is known to produce serotonergic neurotoxicity and associated cognitive deficits and emotional and behavioral changes. The neurotoxicity of MDMA may be due in part to metabolism of MDMA via opening of the 3,4-methylenedioxy ring or O-demethylation to form catechol metabolites like 3,4-dihydroxyamphetamine (HHA; α-methyldopamine) and 3,4-dihydroxymethamphetamine (HHMA; α,N-dimethyldopamine). These metabolites may subsequently undergo further metabolism into reactive oxygen species (ROS) that damage serotonergic neurons. In relation to this, d2-MDMA is thought to be more resistant to metabolism in this location due to the kinetic isotope effect, metabolically requiring a greater duration for relevant cytochrome P450 enzymes to break deuterium–carbon bonds compared to hydrogen–carbon bonds. As a result, d2-MDMA may have less neurotoxic potential than MDMA. On the other hand, whereas the pharmacokinetics and neurotoxicity of d2-MDMA may be altered compared to MDMA, it is thought that the drug will have similar or near-identical pharmacodynamics as MDMA, for instance interactions with monoamine transporters and serotonin receptors, aside from differing metabolites.

d2-MDMA produces hyperlocomotion, stereotypy, and sensitization in rodents similarly to MDMA and with comparable potency. However, there were some slight differences between d2-MDMA and MDMA in terms of these effects at certain doses. In addition, d2-MDMA at high doses might be less lethal via serotonin syndrome in rodents than MDMA based on preliminary findings. d2-MDMA fully substitutes for MDMA in rodent drug discrimination tests and with equal potency and efficacy. The drug produced hyperthermia in rodents similarly to d2-MDMA, but this effect was shorter-lasting and of lower magnitude in comparison. However, this might have simply been related to potency differences in terms of this effect. The in-vitro pharmacodynamics and other effects of d2-MDMA have not yet been studied or reported.

d2-MDMA was studied by William E. Fantegrossi and colleagues and described by these researchers in 2017, 2018, and 2020. It is of potential interest for use in medicine as a better-tolerated and safer alternative to MDMA in the treatment of conditions like post-traumatic stress disorder (PTSD) and social anxiety disorder. On the other hand, d2-MDMA also has potential to emerge as a novel designer recreational drug. Deuterated analogues of MDMA have been patented by Nicholas Cozzi and Paul Daley of the Alexander Shulgin Research Institute (ASRI).

Other deuterated and related analogues of MDMA, such as MDMA-d3, have also been described.

== See also ==
- Substituted methylenedioxyphenethylamine
- List of investigational hallucinogens and entactogens
- DFMDMA, EIDA, and IDA
- ODMA, SeDMA, and TMDA
- SDMA (3-thio-MDMA)
- 4-D (4-trideuteromescaline)
- α,α-Dideuterophenethylamine
- MDMA/citalopram
