= Substituted ethylenedioxyphenethylamine =

Group of psychoactive drugs

EDMA, a notable psychoactive EDxx compound.

The substituted ethylenedioxyphenethylamines (EDxx) are a small group of psychoactive drugs of the phenethylamine family related to the substituted methylenedioxyphenethylamines (MDxx). They include the amphetamines 3,4-ethylenedioxyamphetamine (EDA), 3,4-ethylenedioxy-N-methylamphetamine (EDMA; "MDMC"), and 3-methoxy-4,5-ethylenedioxyamphetamine (MEDA; 5-methoxy-EDA) and the cathinone 3,4-ethylenedioxymethcathinone (EDMC), among others.

EDxx compounds have been found act as monoamine releasing agents, including of serotonin, norepinephrine, and/or dopamine. However, they showed reduced potency in these assays compared to their MDxx counterparts like MDMA, MMDA (5-methoxy-MDA), and methylone (MDMC). Some, such as EDMA, have been assessed and variably found to produce psychoactive effects in humans. These effects have included paresthesia, nystagmus, sedation, hypnagogic imagery, and/or mild visual effects. However, at assessed doses, there were no entactogenic or stimulant effects and no or only mild hallucinogenic effects at best, which led to conclusions that they were essentially inactive.

EDxx compounds were tested by Alexander Shulgin and described in his 1991 book PiHKAL (Phenethylamines I Have Known and Loved). They were first described in the scientific literature by Shulgin by 1964.

== Use and effects ==
Oral doses and durations of ethylenedioxyphenethylamines (EDxx)
Compound	Chemical name	Dose	Duration
EDPEA	3,4-Ethylenedioxyphenethylamine	Unknown	Unknown
EDA	3,4-Ethylenedioxyamphetamine	≥150 mg	Unknown
EDMA	3,4-Ethylenedioxy-N-methylamphetamine	≥150–250 mg	3–5 hours
MEDA	3-Methoxy-4,5-ethylenedioxyamphetamine	>200 mg	Unknown
EDMC	3,4-Ethylenedioxy-N-methylcathinone	Unknown	Unknown
Refs:

== See also ==
- Substituted phenethylamine
- Substituted methoxyphenethylamine
- Substituted methylenedioxyphenethylamine
- Substituted benzofuran
- Substituted amphetamine
- MTDA (5-methoxy-TDA)
