= C-DMT =

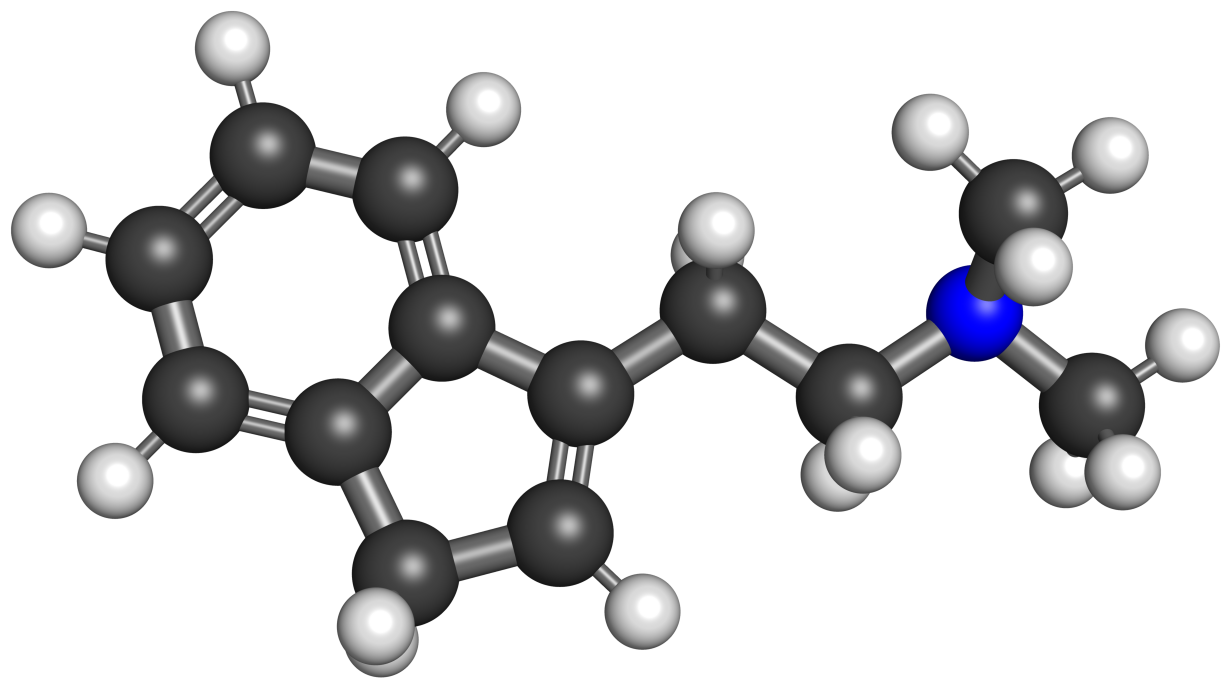

Clinical data
- Other names: N,N-Dimethyl-3-indenylethylamine; 3-(2-Dimethylaminoethyl)indene; N,N-Dimethyl-2-(3H-inden-1-yl)ethylamine; 1-Carba-DMT
- Drug class: Serotonin receptor agonist
- ATC code: None

Identifiers
- IUPAC name: 2-(3H-inden-1-yl)-N,N-dimethylethanamine
- PubChem CID: 547452
- ChemSpider: 476501
- ChEMBL: ChEMBL161241

Chemical and physical data
- Formula: C_{13}H_{17}N
- Molar mass: 187.286 g·mol^{−1}
- 3D model (JSmol): Interactive image
- SMILES: CN(C)CCC1=CCC2=CC=CC=C21
- InChI: InChI=1S/C13H17N/c1-14(2)10-9-12-8-7-11-5-3-4-6-13(11)12/h3-6,8H,7,9-10H2,1-2H3; Key:FOBWFOXXVASKOU-UHFFFAOYSA-N

C-DMT, also known as N,N-dimethyl-2-(3H-inden-1-yl)ethylamine or as 1-carba-DMT, is a serotonin receptor agonist and a 3-indenylethylamine derivative. It is an analogue and bioisostere of the tryptamine psychedelic N,N-dimethyltryptamine (DMT) in which the indole ring has been replaced with an indene ring. Put another way, the nitrogen atom in the indole ring of DMT has been replaced with a carbon atom to make an indene ring.

The drug shows similar affinity for and potency in activating the serotonin receptors in the rat fundus strip compared to DMT. These findings suggest that the indole-ring nitrogen atom of tryptamines is not essential for serotonergic activity. On the other hand however, C-DMT showed dramatically lower affinities for the serotonin 5-HT_{1E} and 5-HT_{1F} receptors compared to DMT (8- and 65-fold, respectively).

The effects of C-DMT in animals and humans, and whether it produces hallucinogenic effects, do not appear to be known.

== See also ==
- Substituted tryptamine § Related compounds
- S-DMT
- isoDMT
- 2ZEDMA
- Dimemebfe
- 3-APBT
