= 3,4-Ethylenedioxyamphetamine =

EDA

Clinical data
- Other names: 3,4-Ethylenedioxyamphetamine; EDA; EDA-6; α-Methyl-1,4-benzodioxan-6-ethylamine
- ATC code: None

Identifiers
- IUPAC name: 1-(2,3-dihydro-1,4-benzodioxin-6-yl)propan-2-amine
- CAS Number: 15033-67-7
- PubChem CID: 5017291
- ChemSpider: 4196440
- CompTox Dashboard (EPA): DTXSID101346692

Chemical and physical data
- Formula: C_{11}H_{15}NO_{2}
- Molar mass: 193.246 g·mol^{−1}
- 3D model (JSmol): Interactive image
- SMILES: CC(CC1=CC2=C(C=C1)OCCO2)N
- InChI: InChI=1S/C11H15NO2/c1-8(12)6-9-2-3-10-11(7-9)14-5-4-13-10/h2-3,7-8H,4-6,12H2,1H3; Key:HDECLNXLHDXDKE-UHFFFAOYSA-N

3,4-Ethylenedioxyamphetamine (EDA), also known as EDA-6, is a drug of the phenethylamine, amphetamine, and EDxx families related to 3,4-methylenedioxyamphetamine (MDA). It is closely related to analogues including 3,4-ethylenedioxymethamphetamine (EDMA), 3,4-ethylidenedioxyamphetamine (EIDA), and 3,4-isopropylidenedioxyamphetamine (IDA). EDMA, the N-methylated analogue of EDA, is known to be a serotonin–norepinephrine–dopamine releasing agent (SNDRA). According to Alexander Shulgin however, EDA and/or EDMA only produced limited psychoactive effects in humans at doses in the range of 150 to 250 mg orally.

== See also ==
- Substituted ethylenedioxyphenethylamine
- 3,4-Ethylenedioxymethamphetamine (EDMA)
- 3,4-Ethylenedioxymethcathinone (EDMC)
- 3,4-Ethylidenedioxyamphetamine (EIDA)
- 3,4-Isopropylidenedioxyamphetamine (IDA)
- 3,4-Dimethoxyamphetamine (DMA)
