= 1ZP2MA =

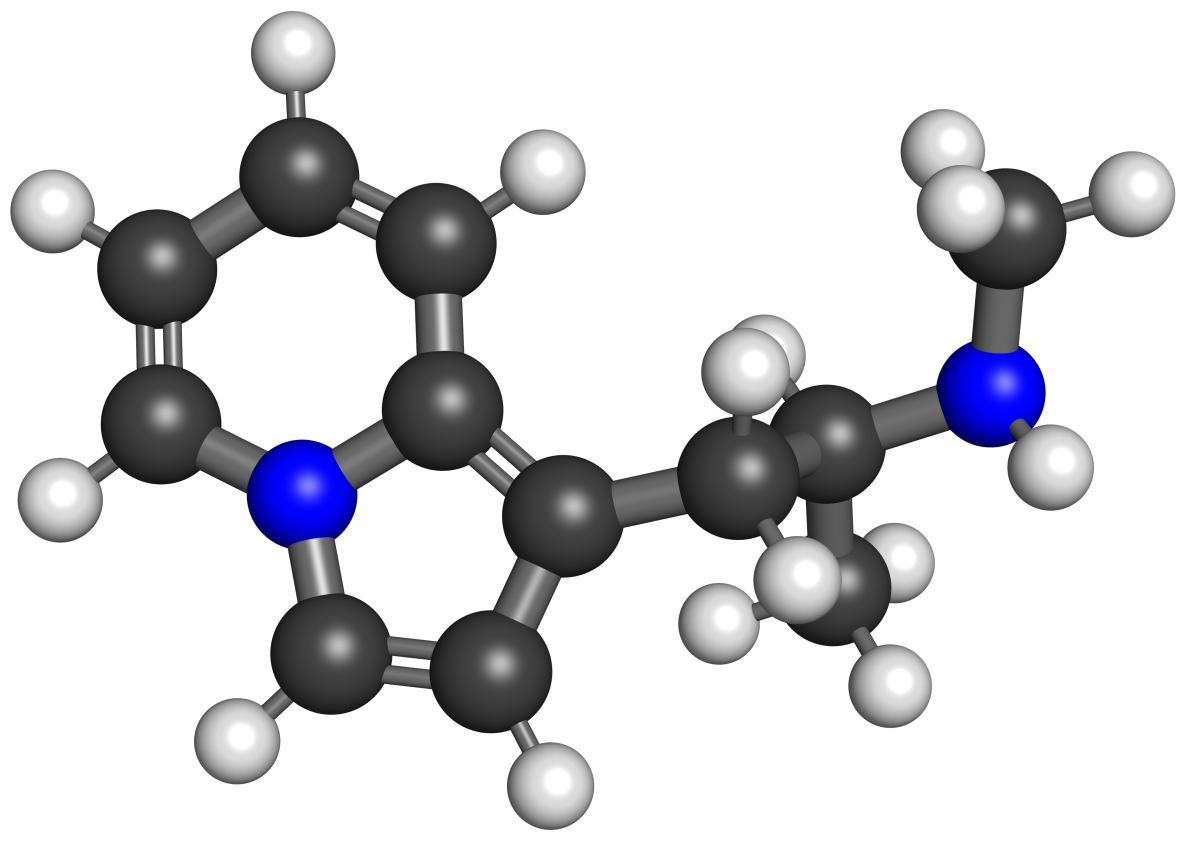

Clinical data
- Other names: [1-(Indolizin-1-yl)propan-2-yl](methyl)amine; 1-(Indolizin-1-yl)-N-methylpropan-2-amine; Compound 26-5; Indolizine-NM-AMT; Indolizine-NM-αMT
- Drug class: Monoamine releasing agent
- ATC code: None

Identifiers
- IUPAC name: 1-indolizin-1-yl-N-methylpropan-2-amine
- PubChem CID: 168256424

Chemical and physical data
- Formula: C_{12}H_{16}N_{2}
- Molar mass: 188.274 g·mol^{−1}
- 3D model (JSmol): Interactive image
- SMILES: CC(CC1=C2C=CC=CN2C=C1)NC
- InChI: InChI=1S/C12H16N2/c1-10(13-2)9-11-6-8-14-7-4-3-5-12(11)14/h3-8,10,13H,9H2,1-2H3; Key:FMOIPWVAARKPNM-UHFFFAOYSA-N

1ZP2MA, also known as [1-(indolizin-1-yl)propan-2-yl](methyl)amine or as 1-(indolizin-1-yl)-N-methylpropan-2-amine, is a monoamine releasing agent of the indolizinylethylamine family. It is the analogue and positional isomer of the stimulant-like drug α,N-dimethyltryptamine (α,N-DMT or N-methyl-α-methyltryptamine (N-methyl-αMT)) in which the indole ring has been replaced with an indolizine ring. 1ZP2MA has been found to be a potent dopamine releasing agent, with an EC_{50} of 62 nM. It is the α-methyl and N-desmethyl analogue of (2-(indolizin-1-yl)ethyl)dimethylamine (TACT908; the indolizine analogue of dimethyltryptamine (DMT)). 1ZP2MA and 2ZEDMA were patented by Tactogen in 2023.

== See also ==
- Indolizinylethylamine
- Substituted tryptamine § Related compounds
- 1Z2MAP1O
- α-Methylisotryptamine (isoAMT)
- BK-NM-AMT
- 3-APBT
