= MEDA =

Clinical data
- Other names: 3-Methoxy-4,5-ethylenedioxyamphetamine; 5-Methoxy-3,4-ethylenedioxyamphetamine; 5-Methoxy-EDA; 5-MeO-EDA
- Routes of administration: Oral
- ATC code: None

Pharmacokinetic data
- Duration of action: Unknown

Identifiers
- IUPAC name: 1-(8-methoxy-2,3-dihydro-1,4-benzodioxin-6-yl)propan-2-amine
- CAS Number: 23693-25-6
- PubChem CID: 25798
- ChemSpider: 24034
- UNII: T2DAA4TB22
- KEGG: D03376

Chemical and physical data
- Formula: C_{12}H_{17}NO_{3}
- Molar mass: 223.272 g·mol^{−1}
- 3D model (JSmol): Interactive image
- SMILES: NC(CC1=CC2=C(OCCO2)C(OC)=C1)C
- InChI: InChI=1S/C12H17NO3/c1-8(13)5-9-6-10(14-2)12-11(7-9)15-3-4-16-12/h6-8H,3-5,13H2,1-2H3; Key:NRVFDGZJTPCULU-UHFFFAOYSA-N

MEDA, also known as 3-methoxy-4,5-ethylenedioxyamphetamine or as 5-methoxy-EDA, is a chemical compound of the phenethylamine, amphetamine, and EDxx families. It is the EDxx analogue of the MDxx psychedelic and entactogen MMDA (5-methoxy-MDA). In his book PiHKAL (Phenethylamines I Have Known and Loved), Alexander Shulgin lists MEDA's dose as greater than 200 mg orally and its duration as unknown. MEDA produced few to no effects at tested doses. The chemical synthesis of MEDA has been described. MEDA was first described in the scientific literature by Shulgin in 1964. Subsequently, it was described in greater detail by Shulgin in PiHKAL in 1991.

== See also ==
- Substituted ethylenedioxyphenethylamine
- MTDA (5-methoxy-TDA)
