= 3,4-Isopropylidenedioxyamphetamine =

IDA

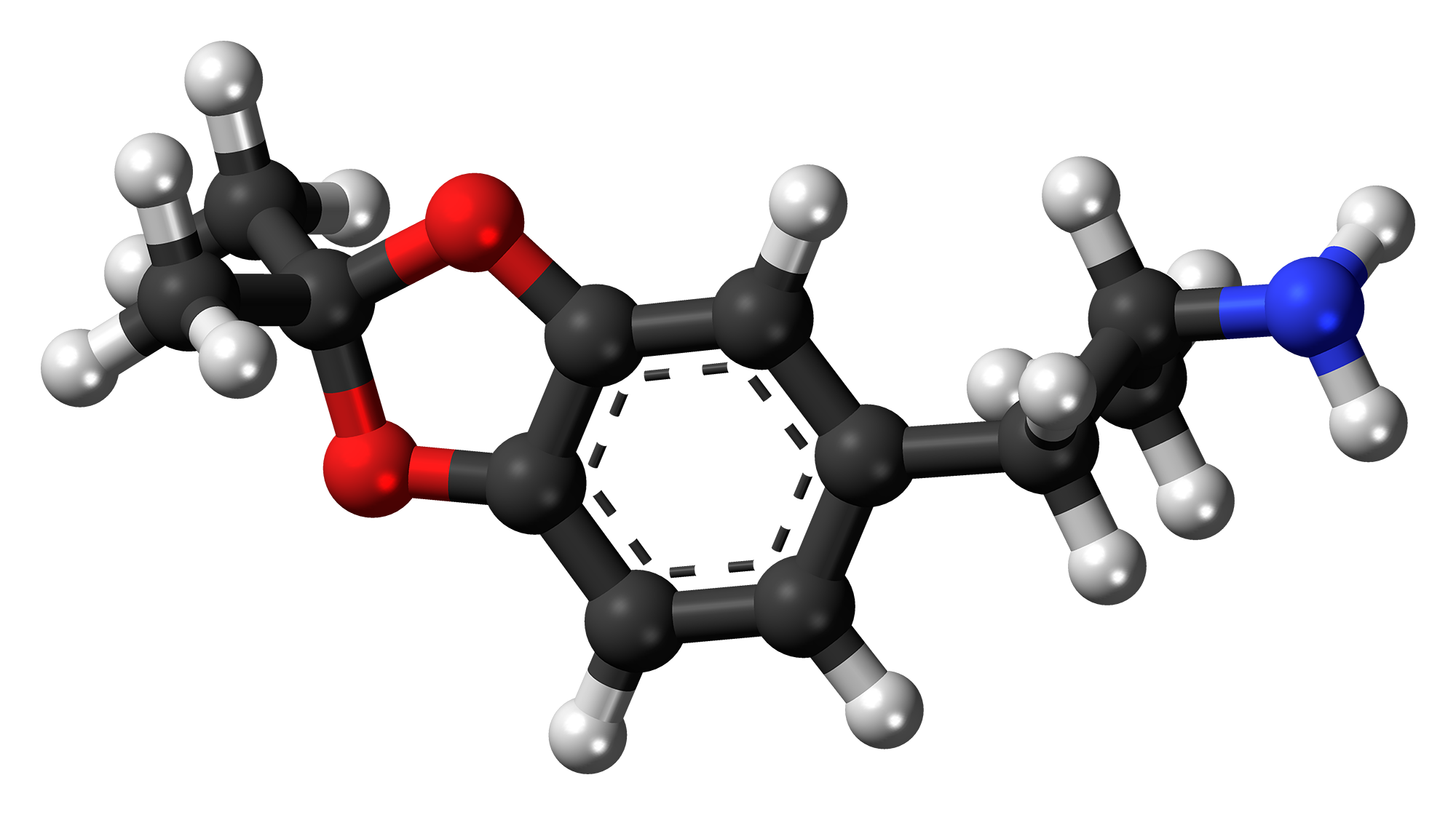

Clinical data
- Other names: IDA; Isopropylidenedioxyamphetamine
- Drug class: Monoamine releasing agent; Entactogen; Serotonergic psychedelic; Hallucinogen
- ATC code: None

Identifiers
- IUPAC name: 1-(2,2-dimethyl-1,3-benzodioxol-5-yl)propan-2-amine
- PubChem CID: 130544
- ChemSpider: 115480
- ChEMBL: ChEMBL3250329

Chemical and physical data
- Formula: C_{12}H_{17}NO_{2}
- Molar mass: 207.273 g·mol^{−1}
- 3D model (JSmol): Interactive image
- SMILES: CC(CC1=CC2=C(C=C1)OC(O2)(C)C)N
- InChI: InChI=1S/C12H17NO2/c1-8(13)6-9-4-5-10-11(7-9)15-12(2,3)14-10/h4-5,7-8H,6,13H2,1-3H3; Key:HJMCSQZYQOFDAL-UHFFFAOYSA-N

3,4-Isopropylidenedioxyamphetamine (IDA) is a monoamine releasing agent (MRA) of the amphetamine family related to 3,4-methylenedioxyamphetamine (MDA) developed by David E. Nichols and colleagues. It is considerably less potent than MDA as an MRA in vitro. IDA fully substituted for MDMA and LSD in animal drug discrimination tests, albeit with 5- to 7-fold lower potency than MDA.

== See also ==
- Substituted methylenedioxyphenethylamine
- 3,4-Ethylidenedioxyamphetamine (EIDA)
- 3,4-Ethylenedioxyamphetamine (EDA)
- 3,4-Ethylenedioxymethamphetamine (EDMA)
- 3,4-Ethylenedioxymethcathinone (EDMC)
- DFMDA, DFMDMA, and d2-MDMA
