= Dirty Pictures (2010 documentary) =

- Directed by: Étienne Sauret
- Starring: Alexander Shulgin, Ann Shulgin, David E. Nichols, Roland Griffiths, Solomon H. Snyder, William Fantegrossi, John E. Mendelson, Ted Shulgin, Robert "Bob" Sager, others
- Production company: Turn of the Century Pictures
- Distributed by: Breaking Glass Pictures
- Release date: March 13, 2010 (SXSW Film Festival)
- Running time: 1 hour, 30 minutes
- Country: United States
- Language: English

Dirty Pictures, also known as Ecstasy Bandits in some parts of the world, is a 2010 documentary film about the psychedelic chemist Alexander Shulgin. It was directed by Étienne Sauret and premiered at the 2010 SXSW Film Festival. The film features Alexander Shulgin, Ann Shulgin, David E. Nichols, Roland Griffiths, Solomon H. Snyder, William Fantegrossi, John E. Mendelson, Ted Shulgin, Robert "Bob" Sager, and others. Alexander and Ann Shulgin were interviewed about the film after it was released. Dirty Pictures has been reviewed by Hamilton Morris and other authors. It was released on DVD by Breaking Glass Pictures in 2011.

== See also ==
- List of psychedelic documentaries
- Alexander Shulgin § Documentaries
