= Benzodioxan =

1,4-Benzodioxan

Names
- Preferred IUPAC name 2,3-Dihydro-1,4-benzodioxine
- Other names Dihydrobenzodioxin; 1,4-Benzodioxane; Benzo-1,4-dioxane; Ethylene o-phenylene dioxide; Pyrocatechol ethylene ether

Identifiers
| CAS Number | 493-09-4 |
| 3D model (JSmol) | Interactive image |
| ChemSpider | 9879 |
| PubChem CID | 10301 |
| UNII | ZC5YP57PSW |
- InChI: InChI=1S/C8H8O2/c1-2-4-8-7(3-1)9-5-6-10-8/h1-4H,5-6H2 Key: BNBQRQQYDMDJAH-UHFFFAOYSA-N; InChI=1/C8H8O2/c1-2-4-8-7(3-1)9-5-6-10-8/h1-4H,5-6H2 Key: BNBQRQQYDMDJAH-UHFFFAOYAF
- SMILES: c1ccc2c(c1)OCCO2

Properties
| Chemical formula | C_{8}H_{8}O_{2} |
| Molar mass | 136.150 g·mol^{−1} |
- Except where otherwise noted, data are given for materials in their standard state (at 25 °C [77 °F], 100 kPa). Infobox references

The benzodioxans are a group of isomeric chemical compounds with the molecular formula C_{8}H_{8}O_{2}. There are three isomers of benzodioxan, as the second atom of oxygen of the dioxane can be in a second, third or fourth position: 1,2-dioxane, 1,3-dioxane and 1,4-dioxane, which respectively give 1,2-benzodioxan, 1,3-benzodioxan and 1,4-benzodioxan.

== Derivatives ==
Some derivatives of 1,4-benzodioxan are used as pharmaceuticals including:

Domoxin

Eltoprazine

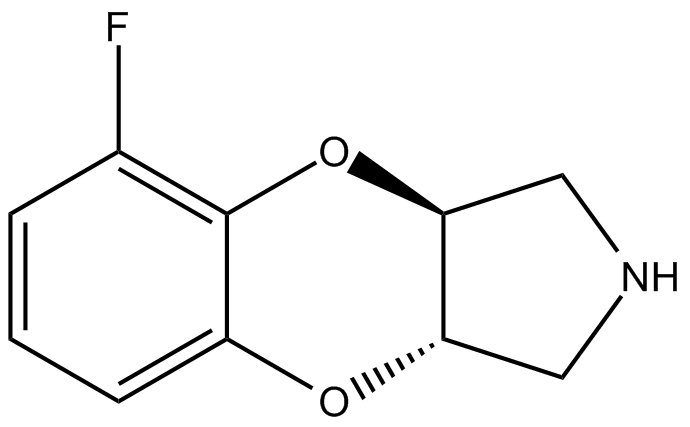
Fluparoxan

Imiloxan

Piperoxan

Proroxan

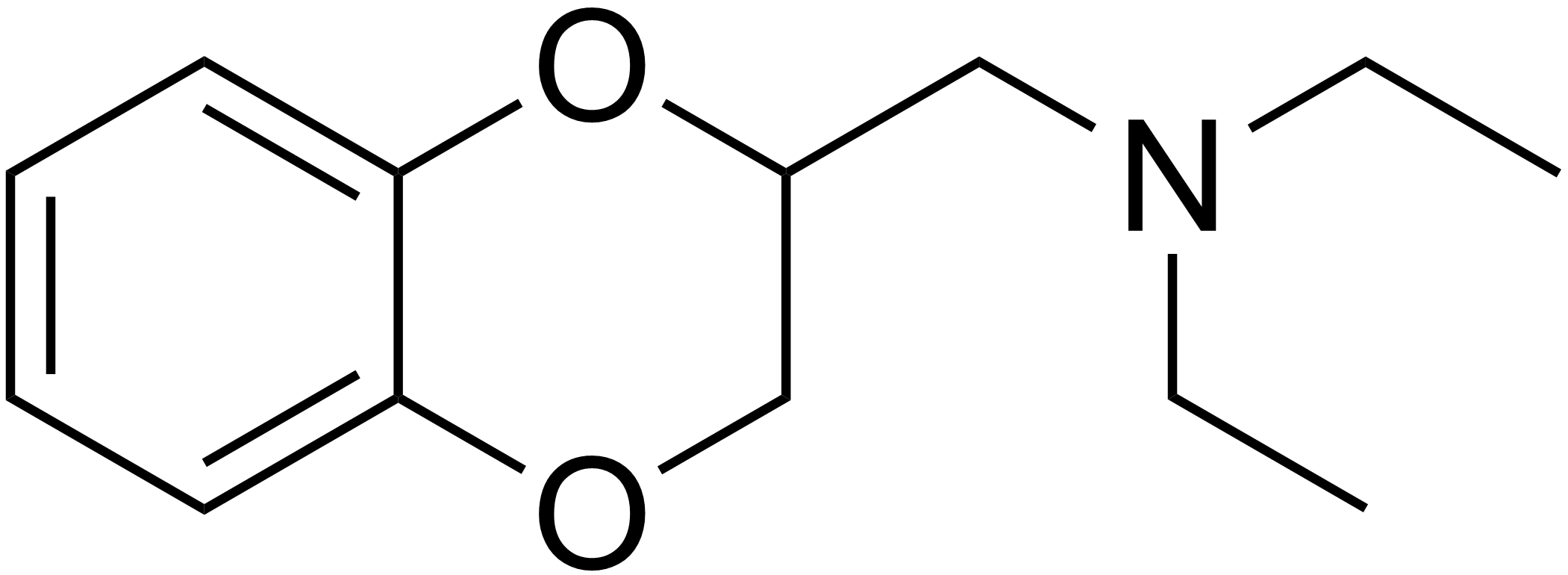
Prosympal

== See also ==
- 1,4-Benzodioxine
