= 3-APBT =

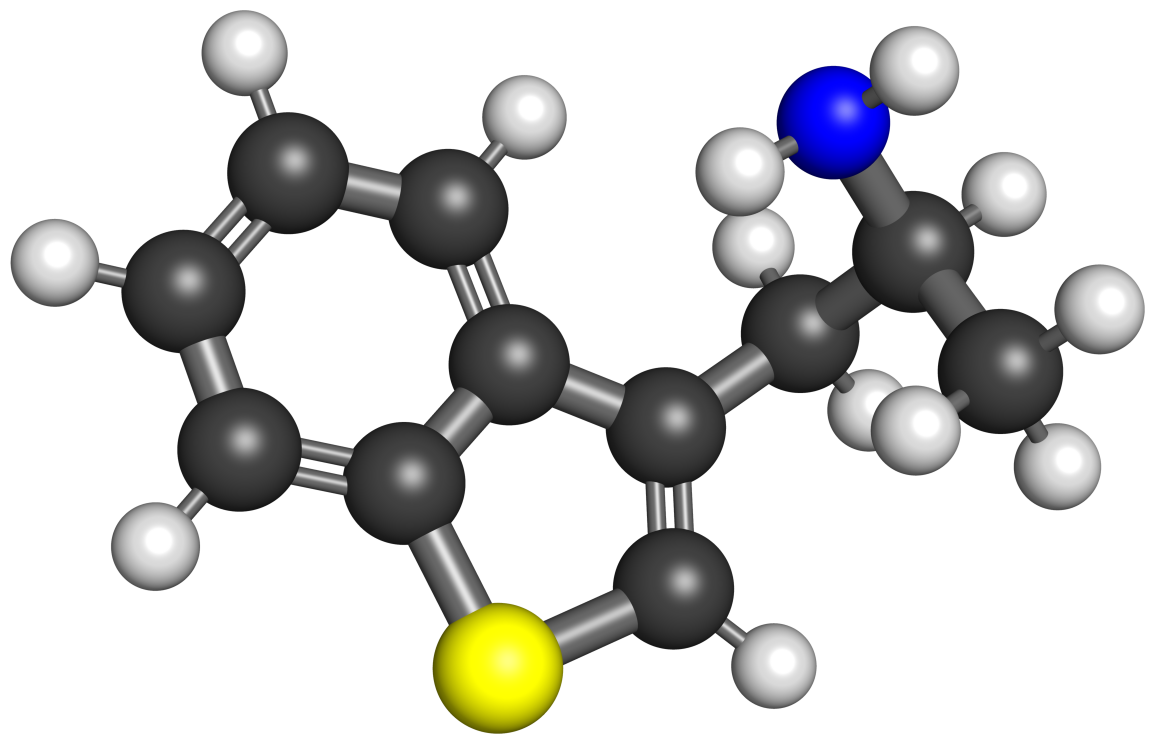

Clinical data
- Other names: SKF-6678; SK&F-6678; 3-(2-Aminopropyl)benzo[β]thiophene; α-Methylbenzo[b]thiophene-3-ethylamine; 1-Thia-α-methyltryptamine; 1-Thia-AMT
- Drug class: Serotonin–norepinephrine–dopamine releasing agent; Serotonin 5-HT_{2} receptor agonist; Entactogen; Serotonergic psychedelic

Identifiers
- IUPAC name: 1-(1-benzothiophen-3-yl)propan-2-amine
- CAS Number: 1201-27-0
- PubChem CID: 517826
- ChemSpider: 451800
- CompTox Dashboard (EPA): DTXSID501283721

Chemical and physical data
- Formula: C_{11}H_{13}NS
- Molar mass: 191.29 g·mol^{−1}
- 3D model (JSmol): Interactive image
- SMILES: CC(CC1=CSC2=CC=CC=C21)N
- InChI: InChI=1S/C11H13NS/c1-8(12)6-9-7-13-11-5-3-2-4-10(9)11/h2-5,7-8H,6,12H2,1H3; Key:NJJBOBSLFFUELD-UHFFFAOYSA-N

3-APBT, also known by its former developmental code name SKF-6678 and as 3-(2-aminopropyl)benzo[β]thiophene, as well as 1-thia-α-methyltryptamine (1-thia-AMT), is a monoamine releasing agent and serotonin receptor agonist of the benzothiophene group. It is an analogue of α-methyltryptamine (AMT) in which the indole ring has been replaced with a benzothiophene ring.

The drug acts as a potent and well-balanced serotonin–norepinephrine–dopamine releasing agent (SNDRA). It is also a full agonist of the serotonin 5-HT_{2} receptors, including of the serotonin 5-HT_{2A}, 5-HT_{2B}, and 5-HT_{2C} receptors. 3-APBT produces the head-twitch response, a behavioral proxy of psychedelic effects, in rodents. It does not stimulate locomotor activity in rodents, suggesting that it does not possess stimulant-type effects. The drug has been reported be a weak monoamine oxidase inhibitor (MAOI), specifically of monoamine oxidase A (MAO-A) (IC_{50} = 4,000–16,200 nM).

3-APBT was developed by Smith, Kline & French (SKF) as a potential pharmaceutical drug in the late 1950s. The drug and its positional isomer 2-APBT were reported to produce various central nervous system (CNS) effects and to be useful as a "ataractics, psychic energizers, and analgetics". 3-APBT has also been reported to have appetite suppressant effects in rodents, but to have considerably lower potency than AMT as an "analeptic" in rodents.

== See also ==
- Substituted benzothiophene
- Substituted tryptamine § Related compounds
- S-DMT
- 3-APB
- α-Methylisotryptamine (isoAMT)
- 1ZP2MA (indolizine analogue of AMT)
- 1Z2MAP1O (indolizine analogue of BK-NM-AMT)
- C-DMT
- 2-APBT
- 5-APBT
- 6-APBT
