= TACT908 =

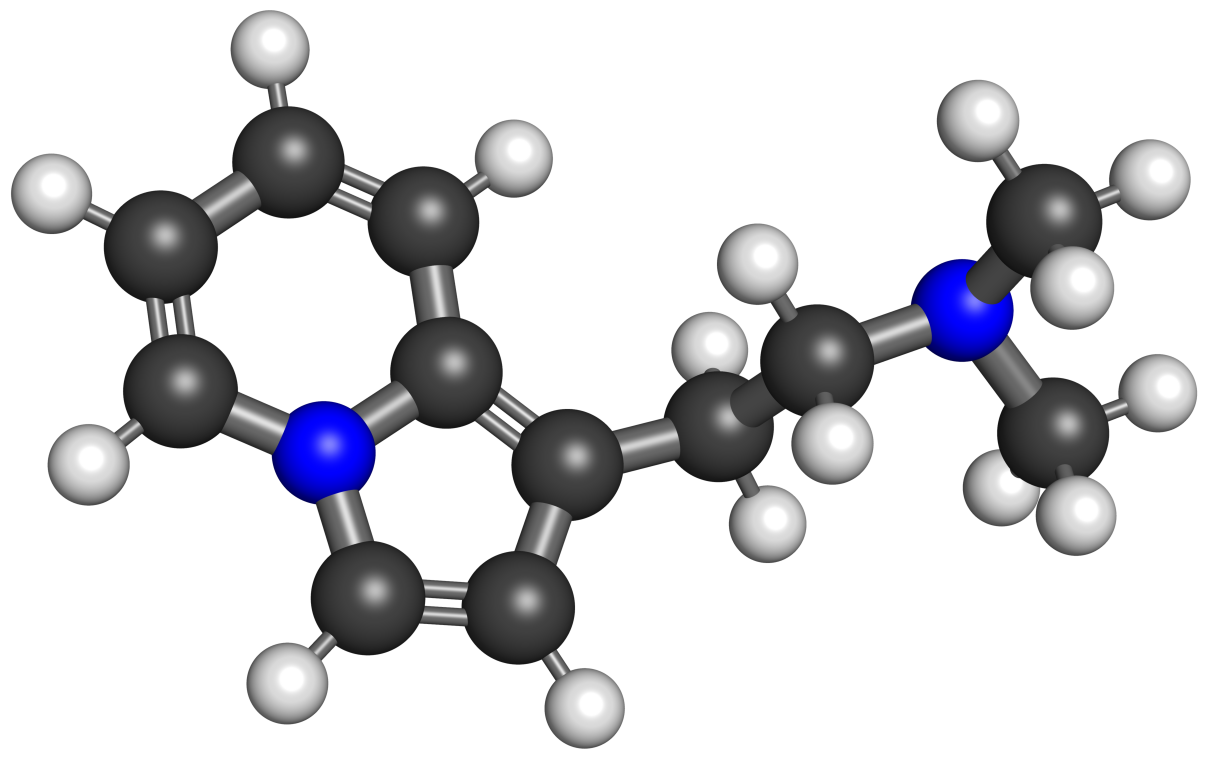

Clinical data
- Other names: TACT-908; Compound 28-12; 2ZEDMA; [2-(Indolizin-1-yl)ethyl]dimethylamine; Indolizine-DMT
- Drug class: Serotonin receptor agonist; Serotonin 5-HT_{1B} receptor agonist; Non-hallucinogenic serotonin 5-HT_{2A} receptor agonist

Identifiers
- IUPAC name: 2-indolizin-1-yl-N,N-dimethylethanamine
- PubChem CID: 169203122

Chemical and physical data
- Formula: C_{12}H_{16}N_{2}
- Molar mass: 188.274 g·mol^{−1}
- 3D model (JSmol): Interactive image
- SMILES: CN(C)CCC1=C2C=CC=CN2C=C1
- InChI: InChI=1S/C12H16N2/c1-13(2)9-6-11-7-10-14-8-4-3-5-12(11)14/h3-5,7-8,10H,6,9H2,1-2H3; Key:CBZZXMYTGARRHB-UHFFFAOYSA-N

TACT908, also known as [2-(indolizin-1-yl)ethyl]dimethylamine (2ZEDMA), is a serotonin receptor agonist of the indolizinylethylamine family which is under development for the treatment of cluster headaches. It is a positional isomer of the tryptamine serotonergic psychedelic N,N-dimethyltryptamine (DMT) in which the indole ring has been replaced with an indolizine ring.

The drug acts as a serotonin 5-HT_{1B} and 5-HT_{2A} receptor agonist. Its EC_{50} at the serotonin 5-HT_{2A} receptor is 52 nM (E_{max} ≈ 30% of that of serotonin) and its EC_{50} at the serotonin 5-HT_{1B} receptor is 143 nM. TACT908 is said to be a non-hallucinogenic serotonin 5-HT_{2A} receptor agonist. It showed little or no activity at 45 other screened targets, including the serotonin 5-HT_{1A}, 5-HT_{2B}, and 5-HT_{3} receptors as well as the monoamine transporters (MATs). Other serotonin receptors besides the preceding, such as the serotonin 5-HT_{2C} receptor, were not assessed. The drug was a weak monoamine oxidase inhibitor (MAOI), specifically of monoamine oxidase A (MAO-A) (IC_{50} = 7,252 nM).

TACT908 is under development by Tactogen. It was patented by Matthew Baggott of Tactogen in 2023. As of January 2025, the drug is in preclinical research for cluster headaches.

The α-methyl and N-desmethyl analogue of TACT908, 1ZP2MA ([1-(indolizin-1-yl)propan-2-yl](methyl)amine or 1-(indolizin-1-yl)-N-methylpropan-2-amine), has also been characterized and described. It is the indolizine analogue of α,N-dimethyltryptamine (α,N-DMT or N-methyl-αMT). 1ZP2MA was found to be a potent dopamine releasing agent, with an EC_{50} of 62 nM.

== See also ==
- Indolizinylethylamine
- Substituted tryptamine § Related compounds
- List of investigational hallucinogens and entactogens
- Non-hallucinogenic 5-HT_{2A} receptor agonist
- N,N-Dimethylisotryptamine (isoDMT)
- 1Z2MAP1O
- C-DMT
- S-DMT
- TACT411
- Rizatriptan
- TACT833
