= William E. Fantegrossi =

American behavioral pharmacologist

William E. Fantegrossi PhD
- Other names: William Fantegrossi; Bill Fantegrossi
- Education: University of Michigan (1997–2002; PhD); American University (1991–1995; BS)
- Occupations: Pharmacologist, psychoactive drug researcher
- Years active: 1995–present
- Organization(s): University of Arkansas; University of Michigan
- Known for: Psychoactive drug research
- Website: medicine.uams.edu/pharmtox/faculty/primary-faculty/william-e-fantegrossi-ph-d/

William E. Fantegrossi, also known as Bill Fantegrossi and the head of the Fantegrossi Laboratory, is a behavioral pharmacologist and psychoactive drug researcher at the University of Arkansas for Medical Sciences (UAMS) in Little Rock, Arkansas. He and his team have studied psychoactive drugs including psychedelics, entactogens, stimulants, and cannabinoids, among others. Fantegrossi and his colleagues primarily conduct animal studies of psychedelic and other psychoactive drugs.

Fantegrossi has noted that existing antidepressants are only slightly more effective than placebos and come with prominent side effects such as sexual dysfunction. He has stated the need for better psychiatric drugs and has expressed interest in chemically tweaking psychoactive drugs like psychedelics to provide therapeutic benefits such as anxiolytic effects. Fantegrossi has worked in affiliation with PharmAla in the early 2020s studying entactogens like MDMA and novel analogues for potential medical use, such as treatment of autistic spectrum disorders.

Along with David E. Nichols and others, Fantegrossi was featured as one of the major academic psychedelic drug researchers at the time in Dirty Pictures, a 2010 documentary about the psychedelic chemist Alexander Shulgin. According to Fantegrossi, he himself does not take psychedelic drugs and has never had a psychedelic experience. Fantegrossi holds materialist beliefs. He plays the guitar and he and his son have competed together in strongman competitions.

== Selected publications ==
- Fantegrossi WE, Ullrich T, Rice KC, Woods JH, Winger G (June 2002). "3,4-Methylenedioxymethamphetamine (MDMA, "ecstasy") and its stereoisomers as reinforcers in rhesus monkeys: serotonergic involvement". Psychopharmacology (Berl). 161 (4): 356–364. doi:10.1007/s00213-002-1021-6. hdl:2027.42/41979. PMID 12073162.
- Fantegrossi WE, Godlewski T, Karabenick RL, Stephens JM, Ullrich T, Rice KC, Woods JH (March 2003). "Pharmacological characterization of the effects of 3,4-methylenedioxymethamphetamine ("ecstasy") and its enantiomers on lethality, core temperature, and locomotor activity in singly housed and crowded mice". Psychopharmacology (Berl). 166 (3): 202–211. doi:10.1007/s00213-002-1261-5. hdl:2027.42/41985. PMID 12563544.
- Fantegrossi WE, Woods JH, Winger G (March 2004). "Transient reinforcing effects of phenylisopropylamine and indolealkylamine hallucinogens in rhesus monkeys". Behav Pharmacol. 15 (2): 149–157. doi:10.1097/00008877-200403000-00007. PMID 15096915.
- Kalechstein AD, De La Garza R, Mahoney JJ, Fantegrossi WE, Newton TF (January 2007). "MDMA use and neurocognition: a meta-analytic review". Psychopharmacology (Berl). 189 (4): 531–537. doi:10.1007/s00213-006-0601-2. PMID 17082969.
- Weerts EM, Fantegrossi WE, Goodwin AK (August 2007). "The value of nonhuman primates in drug abuse research". Exp Clin Psychopharmacol. 15 (4): 309–327. doi:10.1037/1064-1297.15.4.309. PMID 17696678.
- Fantegrossi WE, Murnane KS, Reissig CJ (January 2008). "The behavioral pharmacology of hallucinogens". Biochem Pharmacol. 75 (1): 17–33. doi:10.1016/j.bcp.2007.07.018. PMC 2247373. PMID 17977517.
- Fantegrossi WE, Simoneau J, Cohen MS, Zimmerman SM, Henson CM, Rice KC, Woods JH (December 2010). "Interaction of 5-HT2A and 5-HT2C receptors in R(-)-2,5-dimethoxy-4-iodoamphetamine-elicited head twitch behavior in mice". J Pharmacol Exp Ther. 335 (3): 728–734. doi:10.1124/jpet.110.172247. PMC 2993545. PMID 20858706.
- Brents LK, Reichard EE, Zimmerman SM, Moran JH, Fantegrossi WE, Prather PL (2011). "Phase I hydroxylated metabolites of the K2 synthetic cannabinoid JWH-018 retain in vitro and in vivo cannabinoid 1 receptor affinity and activity". PLoS One. 6 (7) e21917. doi:10.1371/journal.pone.0021917. PMC 3130777. PMID 21755008.
- Moran CL, Le VH, Chimalakonda KC, Smedley AL, Lackey FD, Owen SN, Kennedy PD, Endres GW, Ciske FL, Kramer JB, Kornilov AM, Bratton LD, Dobrowolski PJ, Wessinger WD, Fantegrossi WE, Prather PL, James LP, Radominska-Pandya A, Moran JH (June 2011). "Quantitative measurement of JWH-018 and JWH-073 metabolites excreted in human urine". Anal Chem. 83 (11): 4228–4236. doi:10.1021/ac2005636. PMC 3105467. PMID 21506519.
- Brents LK, Gallus-Zawada A, Radominska-Pandya A, Vasiljevik T, Prisinzano TE, Fantegrossi WE, Moran JH, Prather PL (April 2012). "Monohydroxylated metabolites of the K2 synthetic cannabinoid JWH-073 retain intermediate to high cannabinoid 1 receptor (CB1R) affinity and exhibit neutral antagonist to partial agonist activity". Biochem Pharmacol. 83 (7): 952–61. doi:10.1016/j.bcp.2012.01.004. PMC 3288656. PMID 22266354.
- Fantegrossi WE, Gannon BM, Zimmerman SM, Rice KC (March 2013). "In vivo effects of abused 'bath salt' constituent 3,4-methylenedioxypyrovalerone (MDPV) in mice: drug discrimination, thermoregulation, and locomotor activity". Neuropsychopharmacology. 38 (4): 563–73. doi:10.1038/npp.2012.233. PMC 3572465. PMID 23212455.
- Fantegrossi WE, Moran JH, Radominska-Pandya A, Prather PL (February 2014). "Distinct pharmacology and metabolism of K2 synthetic cannabinoids compared to Δ(9)-THC: mechanism underlying greater toxicity?". Life Sci. 97 (1): 45–54. doi:10.1016/j.lfs.2013.09.017. PMC 3945037. PMID 24084047.
- Tai S, Fantegrossi WE (June 2014). "Synthetic Cannabinoids: Pharmacology, Behavioral Effects, and Abuse Potential". Curr Addict Rep. 1 (2): 129–136. doi:10.1007/s40429-014-0014-y. PMC 4582439. PMID 26413452.
- Baumann MH, Solis E, Watterson LR, Marusich JA, Fantegrossi WE, Wiley JL (November 2014). "Baths salts, spice, and related designer drugs: the science behind the headlines". J Neurosci. 34 (46): 15150–8. doi:10.1523/JNEUROSCI.3223-14.2014. PMC 4228124. PMID 25392483.
- Tai S, Fantegrossi WE (2017). "Pharmacological and Toxicological Effects of Synthetic Cannabinoids and Their Metabolites". Curr Top Behav Neurosci. 32: 249–262. doi:10.1007/7854_2016_60. PMC 5392241. PMID 28012093.
- Ford BM, Tai S, Fantegrossi WE, Prather PL (March 2017). "Synthetic Pot: Not Your Grandfather's Marijuana". Trends Pharmacol Sci. 38 (3): 257–276. doi:10.1016/j.tips.2016.12.003. PMC 5329767. PMID 28162792.
- Kaur H, Karabulut S, Gauld JW, Fagot SA, Holloway KN, Shaw HE, Fantegrossi WE (September 2023). "Balancing Therapeutic Efficacy and Safety of MDMA and Novel MDXX Analogues as Novel Treatments for Autism Spectrum Disorder". Psychedelic Med (New Rochelle). 1 (3): 166–185. doi:10.1089/psymed.2023.0023. PMC 11661495. PMID 40046567.

== See also ==
- d2-MDMA
