= 3,4-Ethylenedioxymethcathinone =

EDMC

Clinical data
- Other names: EDMC; Ethylenedioxymethcathinone; 3,4-Ethylenedioxy-N-methylcathinone; β-Keto-EDMA; BK-EDMA; βk-EDMA
- Drug class: Serotonin–norepinephrine–dopamine releasing agent
- ATC code: None

Identifiers
- IUPAC name: 1-(2,3-dihydro-1,4-benzodioxin-6-yl)-2-(methylamino)propan-1-one
- CAS Number: 802041-86-7
- PubChem CID: 82100609
- ChemSpider: 25630609
- UNII: CXT4C5UJ33
- ChEMBL: ChEMBL3604009
- CompTox Dashboard (EPA): DTXSID001024649

Chemical and physical data
- Formula: C_{12}H_{15}NO_{3}
- Molar mass: 221.256 g·mol^{−1}
- 3D model (JSmol): Interactive image
- SMILES: CC(C(=O)C1=CC2=C(C=C1)OCCO2)NC
- InChI: InChI=1S/C12H15NO3/c1-8(13-2)12(14)9-3-4-10-11(7-9)16-6-5-15-10/h3-4,7-8,13H,5-6H2,1-2H3; Key:MRFMNGZRIIBJTB-UHFFFAOYSA-N

3,4-Ethylenedioxymethcathinone, also known as EDMC or 3,4-ethylenedioxy-N-methylcathinone, is a monoamine releasing agent (MRA) of the phenethylamine, EDxx, and cathinone families related to methylone (3,4-methylenedioxymethcathinone; MDMC). It is the β-keto or cathinone analogue of 3,4-ethylenedioxymethamphetamine (EDMA).

EDMC acts as a serotonin–norepinephrine–dopamine releasing agent (SNDRA). Its EC_{50} values for induction of monoamine release were found to be 347 nM for serotonin, 327 nM for norepinephrine, and 496 nM for dopamine in rat brain synaptosomes. These potencies were about 1.4-fold, 2.2-fold, and 3.7-fold lower than those of methylone, respectively.

The drug was first described in 2015, whereas EDMA has been described much earlier.

== See also ==
- Substituted ethylenedioxyphenethylamine
- 3,4-Ethylenedioxyamphetamine (EDA)
- 3,4-Ethylidenedioxyamphetamine (EIDA)
- 3,4-Isopropylidenedioxyamphetamine (IDA)
