= 2-APBT =

Clinical data
- Drug class: Serotonin–norepinephrine–dopamine releasing agent
- ATC code: None

Identifiers
- IUPAC name: 1-(1-benzothiophen-2-yl)propan-2-amine
- CAS Number: 103861-05-8
- PubChem CID: 22463352
- ChemSpider: 13468670

Chemical and physical data
- Formula: C_{11}H_{13}NS
- Molar mass: 191.29 g·mol^{−1}
- 3D model (JSmol): Interactive image
- SMILES: CC(CC1=CC2=CC=CC=C2S1)N
- InChI: InChI=1S/C11H13NS/c1-8(12)6-10-7-9-4-2-3-5-11(9)13-10/h2-5,7-8H,6,12H2,1H3; Key:LQRQTYOYXPEWJR-UHFFFAOYSA-N

2-APBT is a monoamine releasing agent (MRA) of the benzothiophene family. It acts specifically as a fairly well-balanced serotonin–norepinephrine–dopamine releasing agent (SNDRA), with EC_{50} values of 8.9 nM for serotonin, 21.6 nM for norepinephrine, and 38.6 nM for dopamine in rat brain synaptosomes. 2-APBT was first described in the scientific literature by 2020.

== See also ==
- Substituted benzothiophene
- 3-APBT
