= Indolizine =

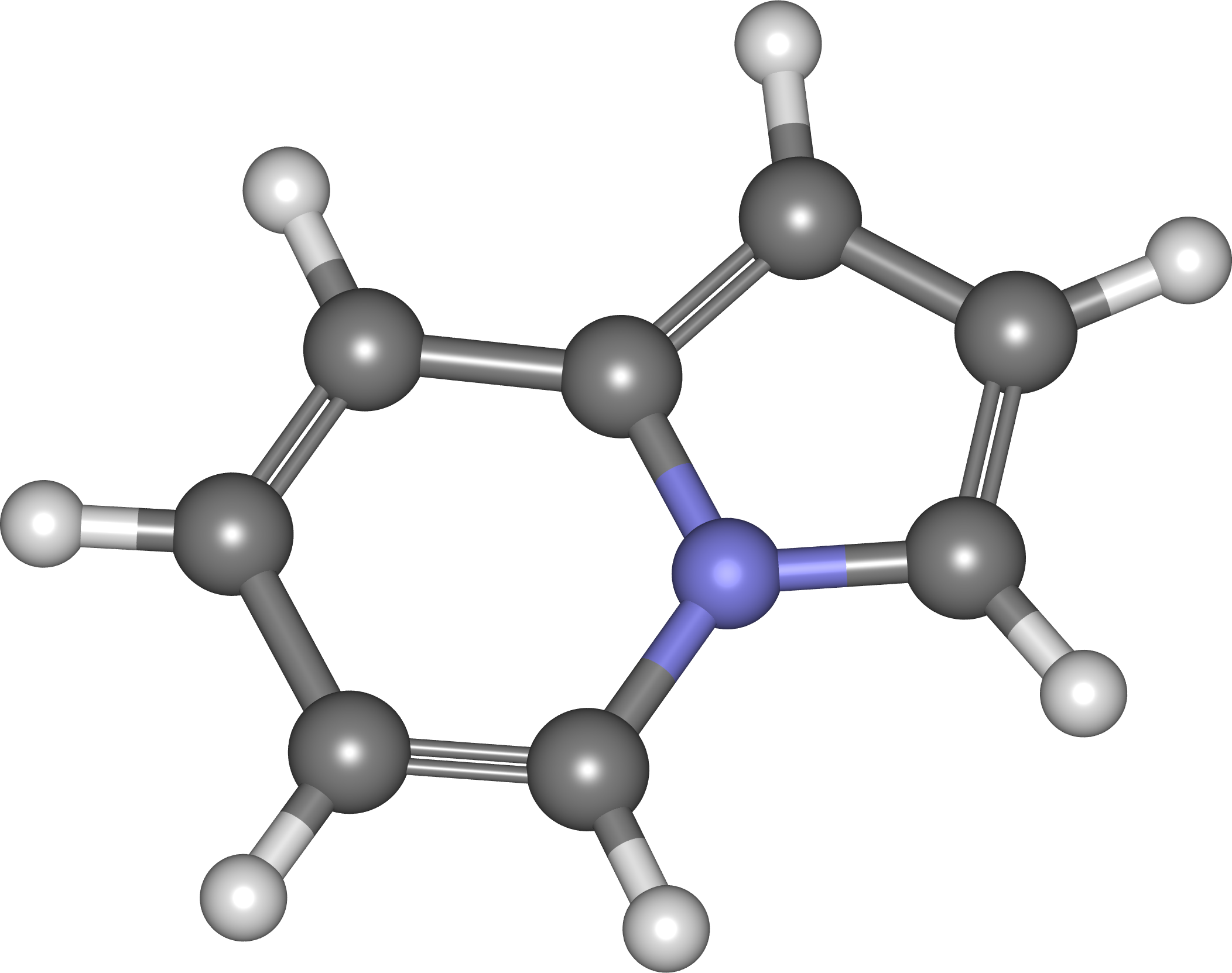

Names
- Preferred IUPAC name Indolizine
- Other names Pyrrocoline; Indolizin; Pyrrolo[1,2-a]pyridine

Identifiers
CAS Number	274-40-8
3D model (JSmol)	Interactive image
Beilstein Reference	107591
ChEBI	CHEBI:35583
ChEMBL	ChEMBL3622747
ChemSpider	8875
ECHA InfoCard	100.219.195
EC Number	691-518-1
PubChem CID	9230
UNII	B48FMH8YFQ
CompTox Dashboard (EPA)	DTXSID50181818
- InChI: InChI=1S/C8H7N/c1-2-6-9-7-3-5-8(9)4-1/h1-7H Key: HOBCFUWDNJPFHB-UHFFFAOYSA-N; InChI=1/C8H7N/c1-2-6-9-7-3-5-8(9)4-1/h1-7H Key: HOBCFUWDNJPFHB-UHFFFAOYAH
- SMILES: c1ccc2ccccn12

Properties
Chemical formula	C_{8}H_{7}N
Molar mass	117.151 g·mol^{−1}
Appearance	White solid
Melting point	75 °C (167 °F; 348 K)
Boiling point	205 °C (401 °F; 478 K)
Basicity (pK_{b})	10.1
- Except where otherwise noted, data are given for materials in their standard state (at 25 °C [77 °F], 100 kPa). verify (what is ?) Infobox references

Indolizine is an heterocyclic compound with the formula C_{8}H_{7}N). It is an uncommon isomer of indole with the nitrogen located at a ring fusion position. The saturated analog is indolizidine, which is the core of certain plant alkaloids such as swainsonine.

Examples of some simple fully synthetic substituted indolizines include 2ZEDMA, 1ZP2MA, and 1Z2MAP1O.
