= 1,4-Benzodioxine =

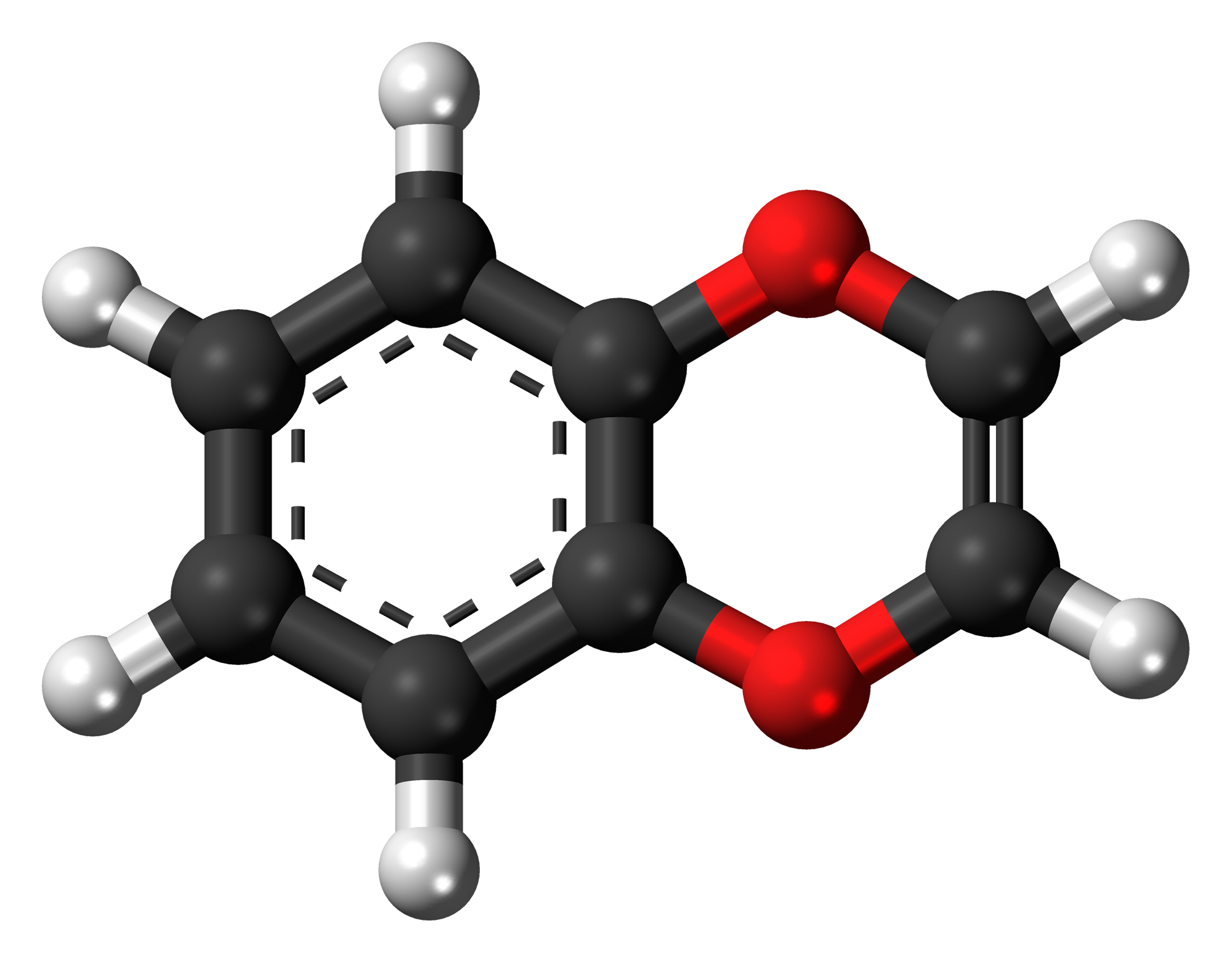

Names
- Preferred IUPAC name 1,4-Benzodioxine
- Other names Benzo[b][1,4]dioxine

Identifiers
CAS Number	255-37-8
3D model (JSmol)	Interactive image; Interactive image
ChemSpider	119848
PubChem CID	136071
UNII	WSY46NQ4T6
CompTox Dashboard (EPA)	DTXSID3021489
- InChI: InChI=1S/C8H6O2/c1-2-4-8-7(3-1)9-5-6-10-8/h1-6H Key: HPARLNRMYDSBNO-UHFFFAOYSA-N; InChI=1/C8H6O2/c1-2-4-8-7(3-1)9-5-6-10-8/h1-6H Key: HPARLNRMYDSBNO-UHFFFAOYAC
- SMILES: O1C=COc2ccccc12; O1C=COC2=CC=CC=C12

Properties
Chemical formula	C_{8}H_{6}O_{2}
Molar mass	134.134 g·mol^{−1}
Density	1.201 g cm^{−3}
Boiling point	193 °C; 379 °F; 466 K
log P	1.6
Vapor pressure	183 Pa

Hazards
Flash point	63 °C (145 °F; 336 K)
- Except where otherwise noted, data are given for materials in their standard state (at 25 °C [77 °F], 100 kPa). verify (what is ?) Infobox references

1,4-Benzodioxine, in chemistry, especially organic chemistry, is an aromatic ring. It is used as a versatile template for drug design.

== See also ==
- Benzodioxan
- 1,3-Benzodioxole
- Ethylenedioxy
