= S-DMT =

Clinical data
- Other names: 1-Thia-DMT; N,N-Dimethyl-3-(2-aminopropyl)benzo[β]thiophene; N,N-Dimethyl-3-AEBT
- Drug class: Serotonin receptor modulator
- ATC code: None

Identifiers
- IUPAC name: 2-(1-benzothiophen-3-yl)-N,N-dimethylethanamine
- CAS Number: 10275-64-6
- PubChem CID: 25118
- ChemSpider: 23463
- CompTox Dashboard (EPA): DTXSID80145488

Chemical and physical data
- Formula: C_{12}H_{15}NS
- Molar mass: 205.32 g·mol^{−1}
- 3D model (JSmol): Interactive image
- SMILES: CN(C)CCC1=CSC2=CC=CC=C21
- InChI: InChI=1S/C12H15NS/c1-13(2)8-7-10-9-14-12-6-4-3-5-11(10)12/h3-6,9H,7-8H2,1-2H3; Key:QAPUMUJBYRYLGE-UHFFFAOYSA-N

S-DMT, also known as 1-thia-DMT or as N,N-dimethyl-3-(2-aminoethyl)benzo[β]thiophene (N,N-dimethyl-3-AEBT), is a serotonin receptor modulator of the benzothiophene family related to the psychedelic tryptamine dimethyltryptamine (DMT). It is the analogue and bioisostere of DMT in which the nitrogen atom of the indole ring has been replaced with a sulfur atom, making the drug a benzothiophene rather than indole or tryptamine derivative. The drug shows about the same activity at the serotonin receptors in the rat fundus strip as DMT. These receptors may correspond to the serotonin 5-HT_{2B} receptor. It has not been assessed at the serotonin 5-HT_{2A} receptor. S-DMT was first described in the scientific literature by Richard Glennon and colleagues by 1979.

== See also ==
- Substituted benzothiophene
- Substituted tryptamine § Related compounds
- 3-APBT (1-thia-AMT; SKF-6678)
- C-DMT and dimemebfe (O-5-MeO-DMT)
- isoDMT and 2ZEDMA
