= 1Z2MAP1O =

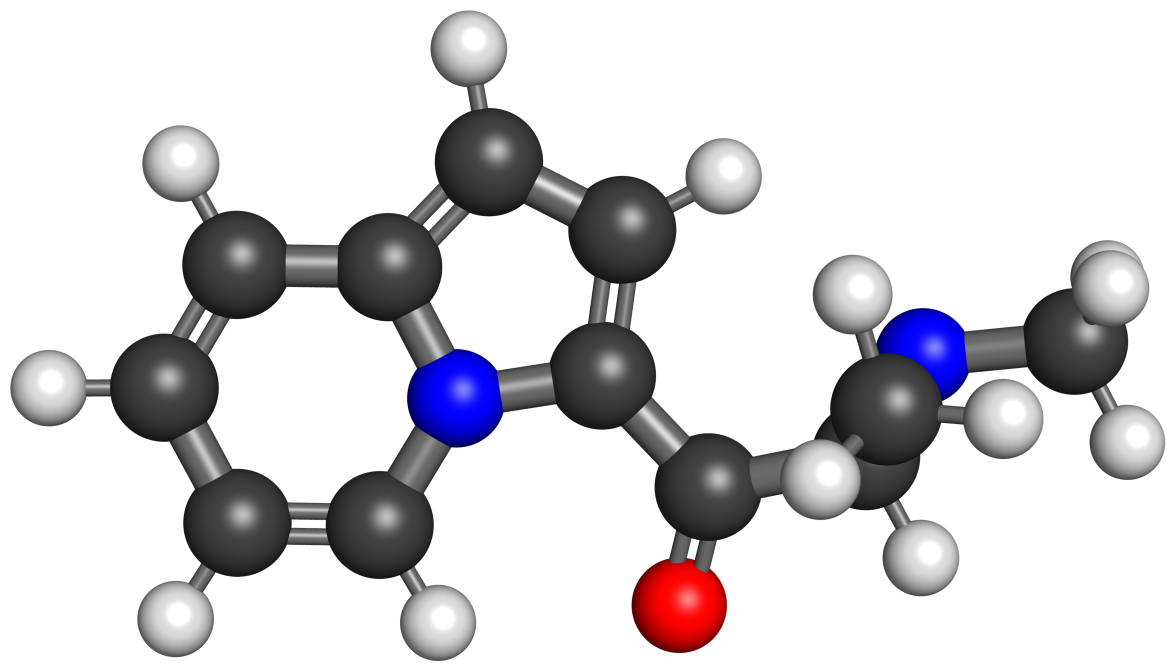

Clinical data
- Other names: 1-(Indolizin-3-yl)-2-(methylamino)propan-1-one; Structure XLX; Indolizine-BK-NM-AMT
- Drug class: Monoamine releasing agent; Serotonin 5-HT_{1B} receptor agonist; Serotonin 5-HT_{2B} receptor antagonist; Entactogen
- ATC code: None

Identifiers
- IUPAC name: 1-indolizin-3-yl-2-(methylamino)propan-1-one
- CAS Number: 2110204-31-2
- PubChem CID: 165756415
- ChemSpider: 26962386

Chemical and physical data
- Formula: C_{12}H_{14}N_{2}O
- Molar mass: 202.257 g·mol^{−1}
- 3D model (JSmol): Interactive image
- SMILES: CC(C(=O)C1=CC=C2N1C=CC=C2)NC
- InChI: InChI=1S/C12H14N2O/c1-9(13-2)12(15)11-7-6-10-5-3-4-8-14(10)11/h3-9,13H,1-2H3; Key:BFSFBVDVCJVAMW-UHFFFAOYSA-N

1Z2MAP1O, also known as 1-(indolizin-3-yl)-2-(methylamino)propan-1-one, is a monoamine releasing agent and serotonin receptor modulator of the indolizinylethylamine family. It is an analogue of BK-NM-AMT (β-keto-N-methyl-α-methyltryptamine) in which the indole ring has been replaced with an indolizine ring.

1Z2MAP1O has been found to be a serotonin and dopamine releasing agent as well as a weak serotonin 5-HT_{1B} receptor agonist and serotonin 5-HT_{2B} receptor antagonist. Conversely, its activity as a norepinephrine releasing agent was not reported, and it was inactive at the remaining sites of the 47 screened targets. The drug's EC_{50} values for induction of monoamine release were 109 nM for serotonin and 227 nM for dopamine in Chinese hamster ovary (CHO) cells expressing the human monoamine transporters (MATs). The dopamine/serotonin ratio was 0.48. Its EC_{50} at the serotonin 5-HT_{1B} receptor was 1,130 nM, whereas its IC_{50} values were 2,140 nM at the serotonin 5-HT_{2B} receptor, 2,410 nM at the dopamine transporter (DAT), and 5,690 nM at the norepinephrine transporter (NET). 1Z2MAP1O's inhibition of the serotonin transporter (SERT) was not reported.

1Z2MAP1O was patented by Matthew Baggott of Tactogen in 2023.

== See also ==
- Indolizinylethylamine
- Substituted tryptamine § Related compounds
- 2ZEDMA
- 1ZP2MA
- α-Methylisotryptamine (isoAMT)
- TACT411
- TACT833
