= Proroxan =

Antihypertensive drug

Clinical data
- Other names: Pyrroxane, Pirroksan

Legal status
- Legal status: Rx in Russia

Identifiers
- IUPAC name: 1-(2,3-Dihydro-1,4-benzodioxin-6-yl)-3-(3-phenylpyrrolidin-1-yl)propan-1-one
- CAS Number: 33743-96-3
- PubChem CID: 36303
- UNII: T5WT3QN49G
- KEGG: D05641
- CompTox Dashboard (EPA): DTXSID9046285

Chemical and physical data
- Formula: C_{21}H_{23}NO_{3}
- Molar mass: 337.419 g·mol^{−1}
- 3D model (JSmol): Interactive image
- SMILES: C1CN(CC1C2=CC=CC=C2)CCC(=O)C3=CC4=C(C=C3)OCCO4
- InChI: InChI=1S/C21H23NO3/c23-19(17-6-7-20-21(14-17)25-13-12-24-20)9-11-22-10-8-18(15-22)16-4-2-1-3-5-16/h1-7,14,18H,8-13,15H2; Key:GZIISXIDAZYOLI-UHFFFAOYSA-N

Proroxan (INN; also known as pyrroxane and pirroksan) is a pharmaceutical drug used as an antihypertensive and in the treatment of Ménière's disease, motion sickness, and allergic dermatitis.

Proroxan is a non-selective alpha-blocker (α-adrenoreceptor antagonist).

Proroxan was developed in the 1970s at the Institute of Toxicology of the USSR Ministry of Health and today is primarily used in Russia. Though originally developed as an antihypertensive, its use can lead to a decrease in alcohol and drug consumption. Currently proroxan is used almost exclusively in psychiatry, narcology, and neurology.
