= 6-MAPBT =

Clinical data
- Other names: 6-(2-(Methylamino)propyl)-1-benzothiophene; MY300; MY-300
- Drug class: Monoamine releasing agent; Serotonin 5-HT_{1B} receptor agonist; Entactogen
- ATC code: None

Identifiers
- IUPAC name: 1-(1-benzothiophen-6-yl)-N-methylpropan-2-amine
- PubChem CID: 166478938

Chemical and physical data
- Formula: C_{12}H_{15}NS
- Molar mass: 205.32 g·mol^{−1}
- 3D model (JSmol): Interactive image
- SMILES: CC(CC1=CC2=C(C=C1)C=CS2)NC
- InChI: InChI=1S/C12H15NS/c1-9(13-2)7-10-3-4-11-5-6-14-12(11)8-10/h3-6,8-9,13H,7H2,1-2H3; Key:ZTCVZGKXXWDMJJ-UHFFFAOYSA-N

6-MAPBT, also known as 6-(2-(methylamino)propyl)-1-benzothiophene, is a possible entactogen of the phenethylamine, amphetamine, and benzothiophene families related to MDMA.

It acts as a monoamine releasing agent and serotonin receptor modulator. The drug's EC_{50} values for monoamine release are 57 nM for serotonin and 71 nM for dopamine. It is also a potent agonist of the serotonin 5-HT_{1B} receptor, with an EC_{50} of 24 nM, and is a potent antagonist of the serotonin 5-HT_{2B} receptor, with an IC_{50} of 72 nM. Conversely, it is far weaker as an agonist of the serotonin 5-HT_{2A} receptor (EC_{50} = 959 nM) and is inactive at the serotonin 5-HT_{1A} receptor. In addition to the preceding actions, the drug is a monoamine oxidase A (MAO-A) inhibitor, with an IC_{50} of 945 nM.

It produces anxiolytic-like and antiobsessional-like effects in the marble burying test in rodents. However, benzothiophenes like 6-MAPBT, despite their induction of dopamine release, are said to lack hyperlocomotion or stimulant-like effects in rodents.

6-MAPBT has been studied and patented by Matthew J. Baggott at Tactogen. The drug has also been patented by Mydecine and given the developmental code name MY300.

== See also ==
- Substituted benzothiophene
- 5-MAPBT
