= 1,3-Benzodioxole =

Kekulé, skeletal formula of 1,3-benzodioxole
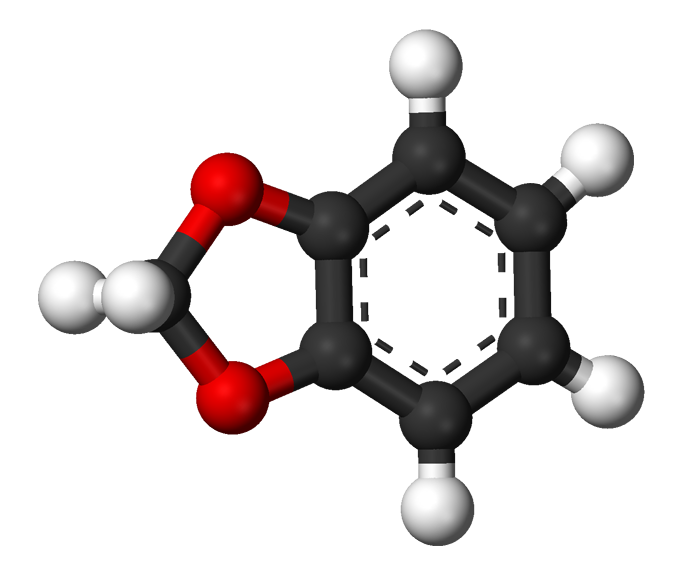
Ball and stick model of 1,3-benzodioxole

Names
- Preferred IUPAC name 2H-1,3-Benzodioxole
- Other names 1,3-Benzodioxole; Benzo[d][1,3]dioxole; 1,2-[Methylenebis(oxy)]benzene; 1,2-Methylenedioxybenzene

Identifiers
CAS Number	274-09-9
3D model (JSmol)	Interactive image; Interactive image
Beilstein Reference	115506
ChEBI	CHEBI:38732
ChemSpider	13881169
ECHA InfoCard	100.005.448
EC Number	205-992-0
MeSH	1,3-Benzodioxole
PubChem CID	9229
RTECS number	DA5600000
UNII	F0XLL582B8
UN number	1993
CompTox Dashboard (EPA)	DTXSID9051951
- InChI: InChI=1S/C7H6O2/c1-2-4-7-6(3-1)8-5-9-7/h1-4H,5H2 Key: FTNJQNQLEGKTGD-UHFFFAOYSA-N; InChI=1/C7H6O2/c1-2-4-7-6(3-1)8-5-9-7/h1-4H,5H2 Key: FTNJQNQLEGKTGD-UHFFFAOYAV
- SMILES: C1Oc2ccccc2O1; C1OC2=C(O1)C=CC=C2

Properties
Chemical formula	C_{7}H_{6}O_{2}
Molar mass	122.123 g·mol^{−1}
Density	1.064 g cm^{−3}
Boiling point	172–173 °C (342–343 °F; 445–446 K)
log P	2.08
Vapor pressure	1.6 kPa

Thermochemistry
Std enthalpy of combustion (Δ_{c}H^{⦵}_{298})	−3.428 MJ mol^{−1}

Hazards
- GHS labelling
Pictograms	(GHS07: Exclamation mark)
Signal word	Warning
Hazard statements	H302, H332
NFPA 704 (fire diamond)	1 2 0
Flash point	61 °C (142 °F; 334 K)
- Except where otherwise noted, data are given for materials in their standard state (at 25 °C [77 °F], 100 kPa). verify (what is ?) Infobox references

1,3-Benzodioxole (1,2-methylenedioxybenzene) is an organic compound with the formula C_{6}H_{4}O_{2}CH_{2}. The compound is classified as benzene derivative and a heterocyclic compound containing the methylenedioxy functional group. It is a colorless liquid.

Although benzodioxole is not particularly important, many related compounds containing the methylenedioxyphenyl group are bioactive, and thus are found in pesticides and pharmaceuticals.

== Preparation ==
1,3-Benzodioxole can be synthesized from catechol with disubstituted halomethanes (diiodomethane etc.).

== See also ==
- 1,4-Benzodioxine
- MDMA
- Methylenedioxy
- Safrole
- Piperonal
- Piperonyl butoxide and sesamex are benzodioxole-based adjuvants, used to enhance the efficacy of some insecticides
