= Sesamex =

Names
- Preferred IUPAC name 5-{1-[2-(2-Ethoxyethoxy)ethoxy]ethoxy}-2H-1,3-benzodioxole
- Other names Sesoxane

Identifiers
CAS Number	51-14-9
3D model (JSmol)	Interactive image
ChemSpider	5592
ECHA InfoCard	100.149.223
KEGG	C19146
PubChem CID	5796
UNII	RKX68JE7G6
CompTox Dashboard (EPA)	DTXSID5042376
- InChI: InChI=1S/C15H22O6/c1-3-16-6-7-17-8-9-18-12(2)21-13-4-5-14-15(10-13)20-11-19-14/h4-5,10,12H,3,6-9,11H2,1-2H3 Key: WABPPBHOPMUJHV-UHFFFAOYSA-N; InChI=1/C15H22O6/c1-3-16-6-7-17-8-9-18-12(2)21-13-4-5-14-15(10-13)20-11-19-14/h4-5,10,12H,3,6-9,11H2,1-2H3 Key: WABPPBHOPMUJHV-UHFFFAOYAE
- SMILES: O1c2ccc(OC(OCCOCCOCC)C)cc2OC1

Properties
Chemical formula	C_{15}H_{22}O_{6}
Molar mass	298.335 g·mol^{−1}
Appearance	Straw-colored liquid
Boiling point	137 to 141 °C (279 to 286 °F; 410 to 414 K) at 0.08 mmHg
- Except where otherwise noted, data are given for materials in their standard state (at 25 °C [77 °F], 100 kPa). verify (what is ?) Infobox references

Sesamex, also called sesoxane, is an organic compound used as an adjuvant for synergy; that is, it enhances the potency of pesticides such pyrethrins and pyrethroids, but is itself not a pesticide.

== Solubility ==
Sesamex is soluble in kerosene, freon 11, and freon 12.
