= 6-APBT =

Clinical data
- Other names: 6-(2-Aminopropyl)-1-benzothiophene; 6-APBT; 6-APBTP
- Drug class: Serotonin–norepinephrine–dopamine releasing agent; Serotonin 5-HT_{2} receptor agonist; Entactogen; Serotonergic psychedelic
- ATC code: None

Identifiers
- IUPAC name: 1-(1-benzothiophen-6-yl)propan-2-amine

Chemical and physical data
- Formula: C_{11}H_{13}NS
- Molar mass: 191.29 g·mol^{−1}
- 3D model (JSmol): Interactive image
- SMILES: CC(N([H])[H])CC1=CC2SC=CC=2C=C1
- InChI: InChI=1S/C11H13NS/c1-8(12)6-9-2-3-10-4-5-13-11(10)7-9/h2-5,7-8H,6,12H2,1H3; Key:QBWPJANWKXULQZ-UHFFFAOYSA-N

6-(2-Aminopropyl)-1-benzothiophene (6-APBT) is a monoamine releasing agent and serotonin receptor agonist of the amphetamine and benzothiophene families. It is related to MDA and other MDA bioisosteres like the benzofurans.

The drug acts as a potent and well-balanced serotonin–norepinephrine–dopamine releasing agent (SNDRA) and full agonist of the serotonin 5-HT_{2} receptors. 6-APBT does not increase locomotor activity in rodents and hence does not appear to have stimulant-like effects. However, it does produce the head-twitch response, a behavioral proxy of psychedelic effects, and hence may have hallucinogenic effects. The drug is a potent monoamine oxidase inhibitor (MAOI), specifically of monoamine oxidase A (MAO-A) (IC_{50} = 600 nM).

6-APBT was first described in the scientific literature by 2020.

== See also ==
- Substituted benzothiophene
- 5-APBT
- 6-APB
- 6-APDB
- 6-API
- 3-APBT
- SDA (3T-MDA)
