= 5-APBT =

Clinical data
- Other names: 5-(2-Aminopropyl)-1-benzothiophene; 5-APBT; 5-APBTP
- Drug class: Serotonin–norepinephrine–dopamine releasing agent; Serotonin 5-HT_{2} receptor agonist; Entactogen; Serotonergic psychedelic

Identifiers
- IUPAC name: 1-(1-benzothiophen-5-yl)propan-2-amine
- CAS Number: 1368128-53-3
- PubChem CID: 82374371
- ChemSpider: 26792704

Chemical and physical data
- Formula: C_{11}H_{13}NS
- Molar mass: 191.29 g·mol^{−1}
- 3D model (JSmol): Interactive image
- SMILES: CC(CC1=CC2=C(C=C1)SC=C2)N
- InChI: InChI=1S/C11H13NS/c1-8(12)6-9-2-3-11-10(7-9)4-5-13-11/h2-5,7-8H,6,12H2,1H3; Key:JBRWOJGXNBGRCE-UHFFFAOYSA-N

5-(2-Aminopropyl)-1-benzothiophene (5-APBT) is a monoamine releasing agent and serotonin receptor agonist of the amphetamine and benzothiophene families. It is related to MDA and other MDA bioisosteres like the benzofurans.

The drug acts as a potent serotonin–norepinephrine–dopamine releasing agent (SNDRA) and full agonist of the serotonin 5-HT_{2} receptors. It has approximately 4- and 9-fold preference for induction of serotonin release over norepinephrine and dopamine release, respectively, in rat brain synaptosomes. 5-APBT does not increase locomotor activity in rodents and hence does not appear to have stimulant-like effects. However, it does produce the head-twitch response, a behavioral proxy of psychedelic effects, and hence may have hallucinogenic effects. The drug is a potent monoamine oxidase inhibitor (MAOI), specifically of monoamine oxidase A (MAO-A) (IC_{50} = 400 nM).

5-APBT was first described in the scientific literature by 2020.

== See also ==
- Substituted benzothiophene
- 5-MAPBT
- 6-APBT
- 5-APB
- 5-APDB
- 5-API
- 3-APBT
