= Methylenedioxy =

Functional group

Methylenedioxy chemical structure.

Methylenedioxy is the term used in the field of chemistry, particularly in organic chemistry, for a functional group with the structural formula R−O−CH_{2}−O−R′ which is connected to the rest of a molecule by two chemical bonds. The methylenedioxy group consists of two oxygen atoms connected to a methylene bridge (−CH_{2}− unit). The methylenedioxy group is generally found attached to an aromatic structure such as phenyl where it forms the methylenedioxyphenyl or benzodioxole functional group which is widely found in natural products, including safrole, and drugs and chemicals such as tadalafil, MDMA, paroxetine and piperonyl butoxide.

Enzymes within the cytochrome P450 superfamily are able to form methylenedioxy bridges by closure of an open, adjacent phenol and methoxy group. Examples of products formed by this process are canadine and berberine. Similarly, ortho-demethylenation can be carried out by other members of the superfamily to open a bridge; a process which is applied to, as examples, both MDMA and MDA during their metabolism.

MDPV and MDPHP, both belonging to the class of pyrrolidinophenones, share the street name "monkey dust," a play on the chemical term "methylenedioxy" present in both substances.
