= Putylone =

Designer drug of the cathinone class

Clinical data
- ATC code: None

Legal status
- Legal status: BR: Class F2 (Prohibited psychotropics); CA: Schedule I; DE: Anlage II (Authorized trade only, not prescriptible); UK: Class B; US: Schedule I

Identifiers
- IUPAC name: 1-(1,3-benzodioxol-5-yl)-2-(propylamino)butan-1-one
- CAS Number: 802286-81-3; HCl: 17762-91-3
- PubChem CID: 122129922
- ChemSpider: 480488897
- UNII: 46BQ874756; HCl: 46BQ874756
- CompTox Dashboard (EPA): DTXSID201341990

Chemical and physical data
- Formula: C_{14}H_{19}NO_{3}
- Molar mass: 249.310 g·mol^{−1}
- 3D model (JSmol): Interactive image
- SMILES: CCCNC(CC)C(=O)C1=CC2=C(C=C1)OCO2
- InChI: InChI=1S/C14H19NO3/c1-3-7-15-11(4-2)14(16)10-5-6-12-13(8-10)18-9-17-12/h5-6,8,11,15H,3-4,7,9H2,1-2H3; Key:NRIHOTHAMAUSRO-UHFFFAOYSA-N

Putylone (also known as β-keto-1,3-benzodioxolyl-N-propyldioxybutanamine, bk-PBDB, and N-propylbutylone) is a stimulant and empathogen compound detected in 2023, around the time of a ban on the related compound eutylone.

== Legal status ==
The specific legal status of putylone has not yet been addressed by any agency or government.

Putylone is likely considered illegal in jurisdictions where similar analogues or psychoactive substances bans are in place, such as in the US, UK, and Ireland.

== See also ==
- Substituted methylenedioxyphenethylamine
- 5-Methylethylone
- Butylone
- Ethyl-J
- Ethylone
- Ephylone
- Eutylone
- N-Ethylhexedrone
- N-Ethylhexylone
- N-Ethylheptylone
