= Benzylone =

Chemical compound

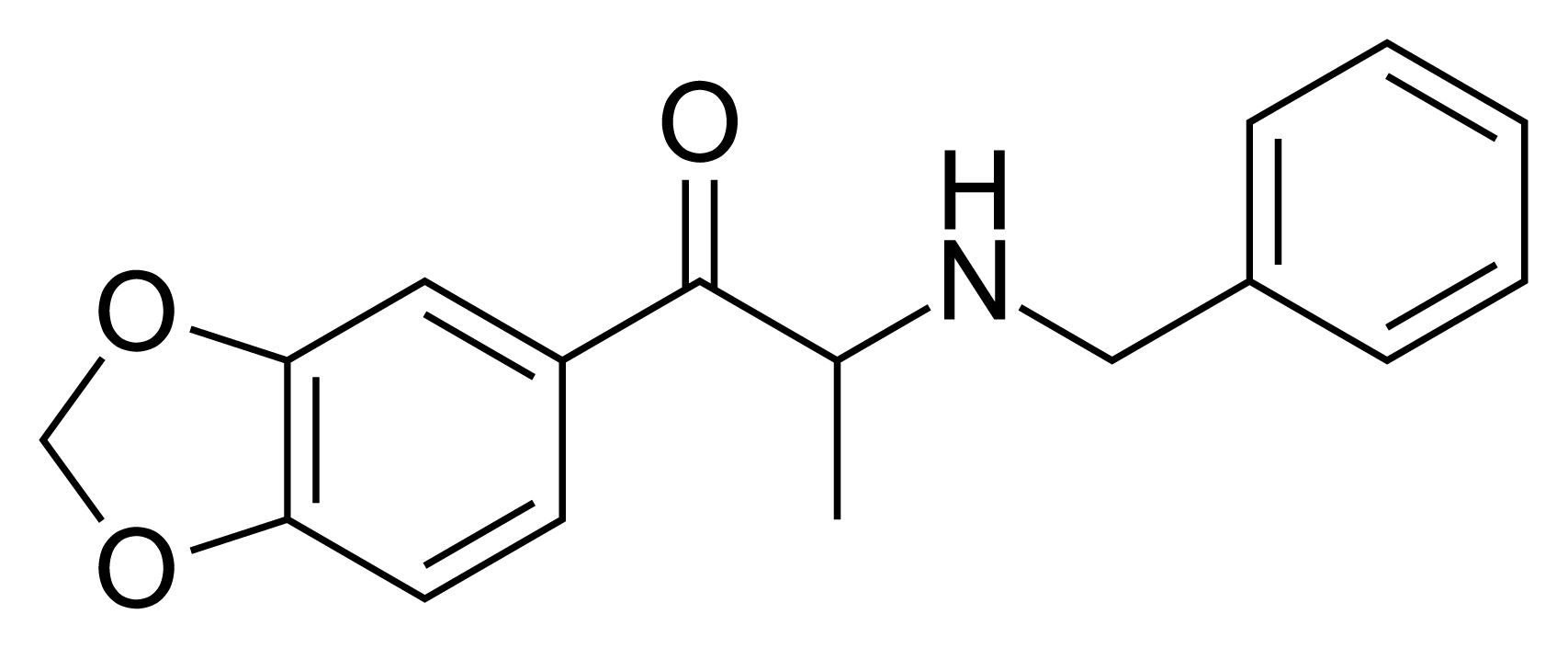

Clinical data
- Other names: 3,4-Methylenedioxy-N-benzylcathinone; BMDP; bk-MDBZ; βk-MDBZ; β-Keto-MDBZ

Identifiers
- IUPAC name: 1-(1,3-benzodioxol-5-yl)-2-(benzylamino)propan-1-one
- CAS Number: 1823274-68-5
- PubChem CID: 91699622
- ChemSpider: 59718199
- UNII: LC23C39YAY
- CompTox Dashboard (EPA): DTXSID401342401

Chemical and physical data
- Formula: C_{17}H_{17}NO_{3}
- Molar mass: 283.327 g·mol^{−1}
- 3D model (JSmol): Interactive image
- SMILES: CC(C(=O)C1=CC2=C(C=C1)OCO2)NCC3=CC=CC=C3
- InChI: InChI=1S/C17H17NO3/c1-12(18-10-13-5-3-2-4-6-13)17(19)14-7-8-15-16(9-14)21-11-20-15/h2-9,12,18H,10-11H2,1H3; Key:KRNIYOJEASBDDP-UHFFFAOYSA-N

Benzylone (also known as 3,4-methylenedioxy-N-benzylcathinone or BMDP) is a recreational designer drug from the substituted cathinone family, with stimulant effects. It has been commonly encountered in seizures of street drug samples but appears to have relatively low potency on its own, being mainly found as a component of mixtures with other related drugs.

== See also ==
- Substituted methylenedioxyphenethylamine
- Benzedrone
- Benzphetamine
- MDBZ
- Methylone
- Ethylone
- Butylone
- Eutylone
- Pentylone
- Ephylone
- Isohexylone
- N-Ethylhexylone
