= Propylone =

Clinical data
- Other names: 3,4-Methylenedioxy-N-propylcathinone; MD-PrC; PrONE; bk-3,4-MDPA
- Drug class: Monoamine releasing agent; Monoamine reuptake inhibitor

Identifiers
- IUPAC name: 1-(1,3-benzodioxol-5-yl)-2-(propylamino)propan-1-one
- CAS Number: 201474-93-3
- PubChem CID: 85764579
- ChemSpider: 129433781
- UNII: TBJ4S8YF37
- CompTox Dashboard (EPA): DTXSID901342656

Chemical and physical data
- Formula: C_{13}H_{17}NO_{3}
- Molar mass: 235.283 g·mol^{−1}
- 3D model (JSmol): Interactive image
- SMILES: CCCNC(C)C(=O)C1=CC2=C(C=C1)OCO2
- InChI: InChI=1S/C13H17NO3/c1-3-6-14-9(2)13(15)10-4-5-11-12(7-10)17-8-16-11/h4-5,7,9,14H,3,6,8H2,1-2H3; Key:YFVKHKCZBSGZPE-UHFFFAOYSA-N

Propylone, also known as 3,4-methylenedioxy-N-propylcathinone is a mixed monoamine releasing agent and reupake inhibitor of the cathinone family related to methylone and ethylone.

It acts specifically as a weak partial serotonin–dopamine releasing agent (SDRA) and serotonin–norepinephrine–dopamine reuptake inhibitor (SNDRI), with EC_{50} (E_{max}) values for induction of monoamine release of 3,128 nM (30%) for serotonin and 976 nM (20%) for dopamine, and IC_{50} value for monoamine reuptake inhibition of 2,462 nM for serotonin, 28,540 nM for norepinephrine, and 1,863 nM for dopamine.

The drug was first described in the literature in a 1996 patent by Alexander Shulgin and Peyton Jacob III. It was subsequently characterized more thoroughly by 2015 and was encountered as a novel designer drug in Europe by 2016.

== See also ==
- Propylcathinone
- Propylamphetamine
- Butylone
- Ephylone
- Eutylone
- Dimethylone
