= Fluoromethcathinone =

Fluoromethcathinone (FMC) can refer to several substituted cathinone compounds:

- 2-Fluoromethcathinone (2-FMC)
- 3-Fluoromethcathinone (3-FMC)
- 4-Fluoromethcathinone (4-FMC; flephedrone)

== See also ==
- Chloromethcathinone
- Bromomethcathinone
