= C10H12ClNO =

The molecular formula C_{10}H_{12}ClNO (molar mass: 197.66 g/mol, exact mass: 197.0607 u) may refer to:

- Beclamide
- 3-Chloromethcathinone
- 4-Chloromethcathinone
