= N-Ethylhexedrone =

Stimulant of the cathinone class

Legal status
- Legal status: BR: Class F2 (Prohibited psychotropics); CA: Schedule I; DE: Anlage II (Authorized trade only, not prescriptible); UK: Class B; US: Schedule I; UN: Psychotropic Schedule II; Illegal in Japan and a controlled substance in Sweden

Pharmacokinetic data
- Metabolism: Neurometabolic

Identifiers
- IUPAC name: 2-(Ethylamino)-1-phenylhexan-1-one
- CAS Number: 802857-66-5; HCl : 18410-62-3
- PubChem CID: 134822125
- ChemSpider: 58838620
- UNII: TAX3KSX6GY; HCl : BH93PZ33WU
- KEGG: C22706

Chemical and physical data
- Formula: C_{14}H_{21}NO
- Molar mass: 219.328 g·mol^{−1}
- 3D model (JSmol): Interactive image
- SMILES: CCCCC(NCC)C(=O)c1ccccc1
- InChI: InChI=1S/C14H21NO/c1-3-5-11-13(15-4-2)14(16)12-9-7-6-8-10-12/h6-10,13,15H,3-5,11H2,1-2H3; Key:CWNKMHIETKEBCA-UHFFFAOYSA-N

N-Ethylhexedrone (also known as α-ethylaminohexiophenone, α-EAHP, α-ethylamino-caprophenone, N-ethylnorhexedrone, Ethylnorhexedrone, Norhexedrone, Ethylhexedrone, hexen, and NEH) is a stimulant of the cathinone class that acts as a norepinephrine–dopamine reuptake inhibitor (NDRI) with IC_{50} inhibition values of 97.8 nM and 46.7 nM respectively. N-Ethylhexedrone was first mentioned in a series of patents by Boehringer Ingelheim in the 1960s which led to the development of the better-known drug methylenedioxypyrovalerone (MDPV). Since the mid-2010s, N-ethylhexedrone has been sold online as a designer drug. In 2018, N-ethylhexedrone was the second most common drug of the cathinone class to be identified in Drug Enforcement Administration seizures.

N-Ethylhexedrone was first synthesized by Boehringer Ingelheim in 1964. It appears to have emerged on the online research chemical market in late 2015. It is an example of a novel psychoactive substance specifically chosen to mimic the features of prohibited substances and bypass drug laws. It is one of a number of substances collectively referred to as "bath salts".

User reports characterize N-ethylhexedrone as having euphoric stimulant effects comparable to those of crack cocaine and α-PVP-type compounds, particularly when they are insufflated or vaporized. Like other substituted cathinones, N-ethylhexedrone has gained notoriety for its association with compulsive redosing and addictive behaviors when abused.

== History and culture ==
N-Ethylhexedrone was patented by the German pharmaceutical company Boehringer Ingelheim in 1964 as a potential anorexigenic agent. The patent describes its synthesis together with other derivatives of aminoketone.

The substance spread remarkably quickly in the NPS market in different European countries. It was first identified in a sample from the Belgian Customs laboratory which was received at the JRC in November 2015. In January 2016, it was identified at the JRC in a sample provided by French Customs. Subsequently, in February 2016, the EMCDDA received notifications of the identification of this substance from other countries, such as Sweden, The Netherlands, France, Belgium and Slovenia.

In 2017 it was the most frequent seized cathinone in the EU, Norway and Turkey. In 2018, it was the most commonly identified cathinone after pentylone in Drug Enforcement Administration seizures.

== Chemistry ==
N-Ethylhexedrone is a derivative of hexedrone, in which the methyl group attached to the nitrogen atom is substituted by an ethyl group. It is structurally similar to pentedrone, and also α-pyrrolidinohexiophenone (A-PHP), from which it differs by the substitution of a pyrrolidine group with an N-ethyl group.

The compound is a molecule of the cathinone chemical class. The term "substituted cathinone" refers to a broad array of substances based on cathinone, the principally active constituent of the khat plant. Cathinone is principally constituted of a amphetamine core (a phenethylamine core with an alkyl group attached to the alpha carbon) and an oxygen group attached to the beta carbon. Cathinones are also known as the beta-ketone (βk) (double-bonded oxygen to the β-carbon) analogs of amphetamines. Notably, the cathinone backbone can be modified in three different places to create hundreds of possible compounds, which include substituents on the aromatic ring (R_{2}-R_{5}), the alpha carbon (R_{α}), or the amine group (R_{N1}, R_{N2}).

Relative to cathinone, N-ethylhexedrone consists of two added substitutions. At the R_{α} position, a n-butyl substitution forms a hexan chain. The second substitution is an ethyl group, that's attached to the amine group at R_{N2}, thus forming N-ethyl.

== Pharmacology ==
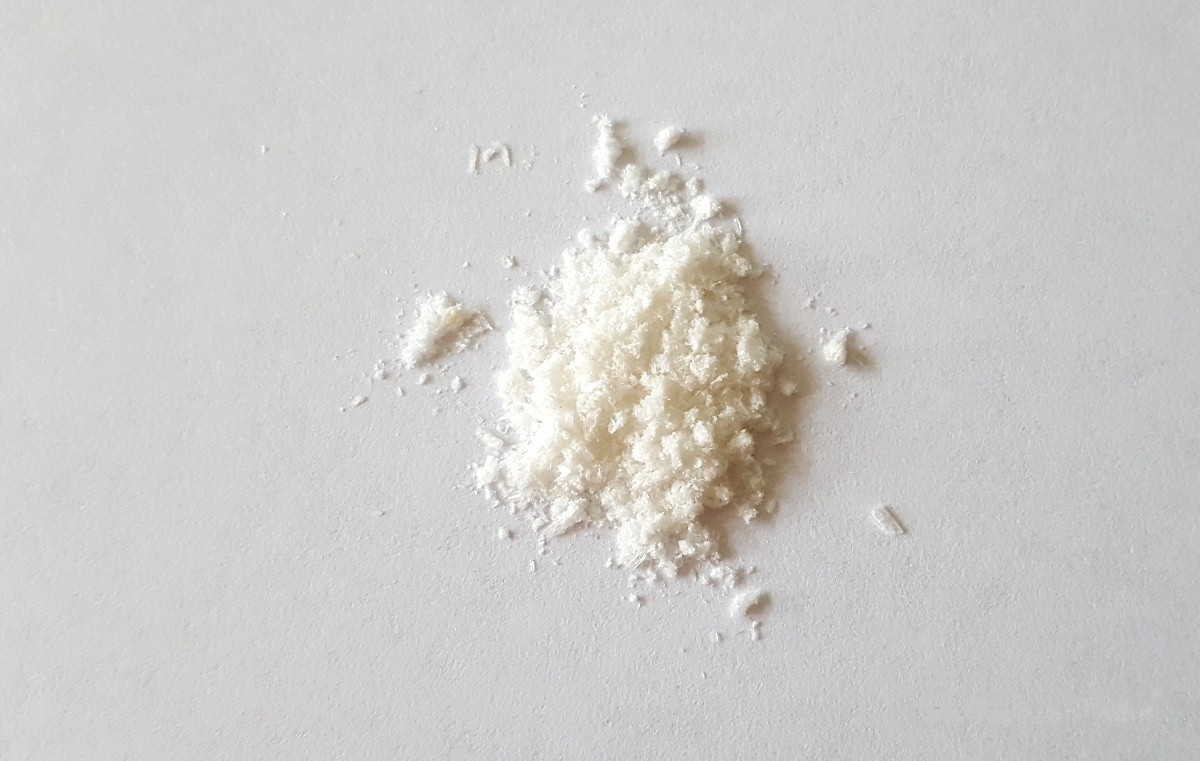
A sample of N-Ethylhexedrone

Very little data exists on the human pharmacokinetics and pharmacodynamics of N-ethylhexedrone and many other recently introduced substituted cathinones, aside from post-mortem results in overdose cases. Like amphetamines, synthetic cathinones exert their stimulating and sympathomimetic effects via increasing synaptic concentration of catecholamines such as dopamine, serotonin and norepinephrine. These molecules are able to inhibit monoamine reuptake transporters producing a decreased clearance of the neurotransmitters from the synapse. Furthermore, they may cause release of biogenic amines from intracellular stores. It appears that N-ethylhexedrone has high preference for the dopamine transporter.

Based on the structure and assuming that N-ethylhexedrone is metabolized similarly to other cathinones, this compound is likely metabolized through N-dealkylation and/or reduction of the carbonyl group followed by N-dealkylation.

Synthetic cathinones are generally less able than amphetamines to cross the blood–brain barrier because the beta-keto group causes an increase in polarity. Unlike other synthetic cathinones, pyrrolidine derivatives have a higher ability to cross the blood–brain barrier because the pyrrolidine ring confers a low polarity to these molecules. The studies on the metabolism of synthetic cathinones have shown that they are N-demethylated, the keto group is reduced to hydroxyl and ring alkyl groups are oxidised.

== Legal status ==
Internationally, N-ethylhexedrone was added to the UN Convention on Psychotropic Substances as a Schedule II controlled substance in March 2020.

- Brazil: Possession, production and sale is illegal as it is listed on Portaria SVS/MS nº 344 since June 5, 2017.
- Canada: N-Ethylhexedrone is a Schedule I controlled substance.
- Germany: N-Ethylhexedrone is controlled under the NpSG (New Psychoactive Substances Act) as of November 26, 2016. Production and import with the aim to place it on the market, administration to another person, placing it on the market and trading is punishable. Possession is illegal but not punishable. The legislator considers it possible that orders of N-ethylhexedrone are punishable as an incitement to place it on the market.
- Hungary: N-Ethylhexedrone is controlled as a new psychoactive substance.
- Ireland: N-Ethylhexedrone is controlled under SI 173/2017 under Schedule 1, paragraph 1(b) (page 35) as the substance is structurally derived from 2-amino-1-phenyl-1-propanone and is I the 3-position of the propanone side-chain with an alkyl substituent in this case, an ethyl group (subparagraph iii).
- Japan: N-Ethylhexedrone is a controlled substance.
- Sweden: N-Ethylhexedrone was classified as a potentially dangerous substance in Sweden on June 21, 2016, and is thus a controlled substance but neither narcotics-classified or fully outlawed.
- Switzerland: N-Ethylhexedrone can be considered a controlled substance as a defined derivative of Cathinone under Verzeichnis E point 1. It is legal when used for scientific or industrial use.
- United Kingdom: N-Ethylhexedrone is a Class B drug in the United Kingdom as a result of the cathinone catch-all clause.
- United States: N-Ethylhexedrone was placed in Schedule I by a DEA temporary scheduling order effective July 2019 and was permanently placed in Schedule I effective June 2022.

== See also ==
- 3F-NEH
- 4-Methylethcathinone
- 4'-Methyl-α-pyrrolidinohexiophenone
- α-Pyrrolidinohexiophenone
- Ethcathinone
- MDPHP
- N-Ethylbuphedrone
- N-Ethylpentedrone
- N-Ethylhexylone
- N-Ethylheptedrone
- N-Ethylheptylone
- Pentedrone
- Ephylone
- Eutylone
