= Bromomethcathinone =

Bromomethcathinone (BMC) may refer to:

- 3-Bromomethcathinone
- 4-Bromomethcathinone

== See also ==
- Fluoromethcathinone
- Chloromethcathinone
