= C10H12FNO =

The molecular formula for C_{10}H_{12}FNO (molar mass: 181.21 g/mol, exact mass: 181.0903 u) may refer to:

- Flephedrone, also known as 4-fluoromethcathinone (4-FMC)
- 2-Fluoromethcathinone (2-FMC)
- 3-Fluoromethcathinone (3-FMC)
