= N-Ethylheptedrone =

Designer drug of the substituted cathinone class

Identifiers
- IUPAC name: 2-(ethylamino)-1-phenylheptan-1-one
- CAS Number: 2514784-72-4
- PubChem CID: 163195977
- ChemSpider: 81367356
- CompTox Dashboard (EPA): DTXSID301342260

Chemical and physical data
- Formula: C_{15}H_{23}NO
- Molar mass: 233.355 g·mol^{−1}
- 3D model (JSmol): Interactive image
- SMILES: O=C(C(CCCCC)NCC)c1ccccc1

N-Ethylheptedrone is a recreational designer drug from the substituted cathinone family, with stimulant effects. It is a homologue of related drugs such as ethcathinone, N-ethylbuphedrone and N-ethylhexedrone but with a longer pentyl side chain. It was first identified in Hungary in 2019, and has since been reported in New Zealand.

== See also ==
- α-PEP
- 3F-NEH
- 4F-POP
- Ephylone
- N-Ethylpentedrone
- N-Ethylhexylone
- N-Ethylheptylone
