= N-Ethylpentedrone =

Designer drug of the substituted cathinone class

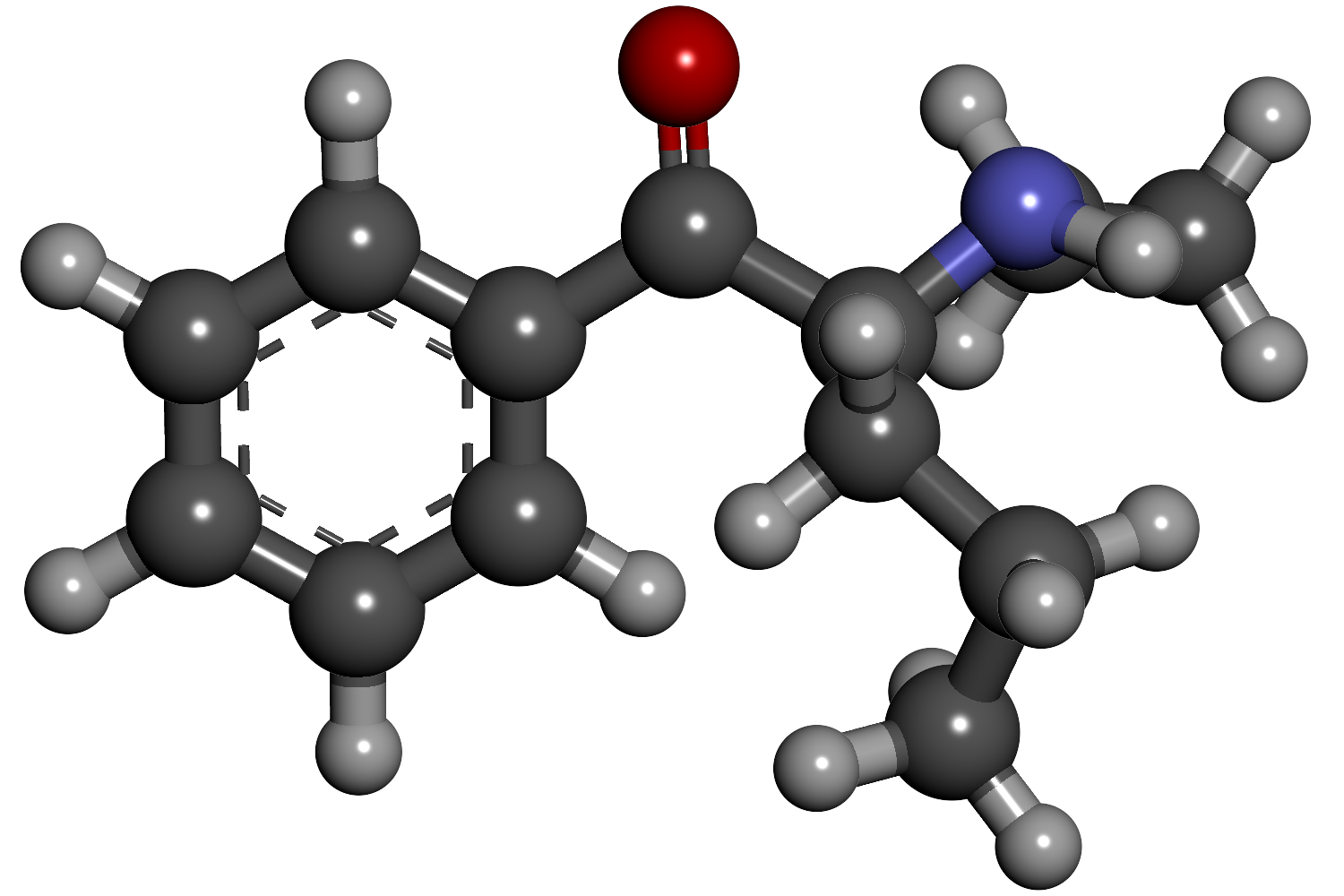

Legal status
- Legal status: BR: Class F2 (Prohibited psychotropics); DE: NpSG (Industrial and scientific use only); UK: Class B; Illegal in Japan and as of October 2025 legal, but "suspicious" to produce, in China, Controlled substance in Sweden

Identifiers
- IUPAC name: 2-(Ethylamino)-1-phenylpentan-1-one
- CAS Number: 779974-89-9 18268-16-1 (HCl)
- PubChem CID: 205592
- ChemSpider: 178126
- UNII: B483GRH93Q
- CompTox Dashboard (EPA): DTXSID201024619

Chemical and physical data
- Formula: C_{13}H_{19}NO
- Molar mass: 205.301 g·mol^{−1}
- 3D model (JSmol): Interactive image
- SMILES: CCCC(C(=O)C1=CC=CC=C1)NCC
- InChI: InChI=InChI=1S/C13H19NO/c1-3-8-12(14-4-2)13(15)11-9-6-5-7-10-11/h5-7,9-10,12,14H,3-4,8H2,1-2H3; Key:QQAHEGDXEXIQPR-UHFFFAOYSA-N

N-Ethylpentedrone (also known as α-ethylaminopentiophenone, α-EAPP, α-ethylamino-valerophenone, N-ethylnorpentedrone, Ethylnorpentedrone, Norpentedrone, Ethylpentedrone, and NEP) is a chemical compound and stimulant of the substituted cathinone class. Since the mid-2010s, NEP has been sold online as a designer drug. It is the N-ethyl analog of pentedrone. N-Ethylpentedrone acts as a norepinephrine-dopamine reuptake inhibitor (NDRI) without inducing monoamine release. N-Ethylpentedrone also slightly inhibits reuptake serotonin without its release.

== Legal status ==
NEP is illegal in Japan and China, and is classified as a '"potentially harmful substance"', thus, controlled. It has also been illegal in Taiwan since February 2026.

In 2026, the use of this drug is causing concern amongst the authorities in Réunion.

== See also ==
- Pentedrone
- 4-Methylethcathinone
- 4'-Methyl-α-pyrrolidinohexiophenone
- α-Pyrrolidinohexiophenone
- Ethcathinone
- N-Ethylbuphedrone
- N-Ethylhexedrone
- N-Ethylheptedrone
- Ephylone
