= Mexedrone =

Stimulant and entactogen drug

Legal status
- Legal status: DE: NpSG (Industrial and scientific use only); UK: Under Psychoactive Substances Act; Illegal in Japan and Sweden

Identifiers
- IUPAC name: 3-Methoxy-2-(methylamino)-1-(4-methylphenyl)propan-1-one
- CAS Number: 2166915-02-0
- PubChem CID: 129318262
- ChemSpider: 52324347
- UNII: 2AFZ6G3X7J

Chemical and physical data
- Formula: C_{12}H_{17}NO_{2}
- Molar mass: 207.273 g·mol^{−1}
- 3D model (JSmol): Interactive image
- SMILES: Cc1ccc(cc1)C(=O)C(COC)NC
- InChI: InChI=1S/C12H17NO2/c1-9-4-6-10(7-5-9)12(14)11(13-2)8-15-3/h4-7,11,13H,8H2,1-3H3; Key:JHGDCSPZKQLBOP-UHFFFAOYSA-N

Mexedrone (also known as 4-MMC-MeO) is a stimulant and an entactogen drug of the cathinone class that has been sold online as a designer drug. It is the alpha-methoxy derivative of Mephedrone.

== Pharmacology ==
Mexedrone acts as a weak serotonin–norepinephrine–dopamine reuptake inhibitor (SNDRI) with IC_{50} values of 5,289 nM, 8,869 nM, and 6,844 nM, respectively, as well as a weak serotonin releasing agent (SRA) with an EC_{50} value of 2,525 nM.

== Legal status ==
Mexedrone is illegal in Sweden as of January 26, 2016 as well as Japan as of August 24, 2016.

== See also ==
- 4-Methylcathinone
- 4-Methylbuphedrone
- 4-Methylethcathinone
- Zylofuramine
