= C9H10ClNO =

The molecular formula C_{9}H_{10}ClNO may refer to:

- 3-Chlorocathinone
