= N-Ethylbuphedrone =

Stimulant of the cathinone class

Legal status
- Legal status: DE: Anlage I (Authorized scientific use only); UK: Class B

Identifiers
- IUPAC name: 2-(Ethylamino)-1-phenylbutan-1-one
- CAS Number: 1354631-28-9
- PubChem CID: 20326296
- ChemSpider: 15397161
- UNII: VUF6VC063Q
- CompTox Dashboard (EPA): DTXSID30605441

Chemical and physical data
- Formula: C_{12}H_{17}NO
- Molar mass: 191.274 g·mol^{−1}
- 3D model (JSmol): Interactive image
- SMILES: CCNC(CC)C(=O)c1ccccc1
- InChI: InChI=1S/C12H17NO/c1-3-11(13-4-2)12(14)10-8-6-5-7-9-10/h5-9,11,13H,3-4H2,1-2H3; Key:HEPVRDHGUWFXJS-UHFFFAOYSA-N

N-Ethylbuphedrone (also known as NEB) is a stimulant of the cathinone class that has been sold as a designer drug. It is the β-ketone analogue of N,alpha-diethylphenylethylamine.

== Legal status ==
As of October 2015 NEB is a controlled substance in China.

In the United States NEB is considered a schedule 1 controlled substance as a positional isomer of 4-Methylethcathinone (4-MEC)

== See also ==
- 4-Methylbuphedrone
- 4-Methylethcathinone
- Buphedrone
- Ethcathinone
- Etilamfetamine
- N-Ethylpentedrone
- N-Ethylhexedrone
- N-Ethylheptedrone
