= C15H19N3O2 =

The molecular formula C_{15}H_{19}N_{3}O_{2} (molar mass: 273.336 g/mol) may refer to:

- Mavacamten
- BOD-PVP
