= 4-Chloroethcathinone =

Clinical data
- Other names: 4-CEC; 4-Chloro-N-ethylcathinone; 4′-Chloro-2-(ethylamino)propanophenone; 4Cl-EC; SKF-70948; SKF70948; SK&F-70948; FWH-494; FWH494
- Drug class: Stimulant; Entactogen; Serotonin releasing agent or serotonin–dopamine releasing agent
- ATC code: None

Identifiers
- IUPAC name: 1-(4-chlorophenyl)-2-(ethylamino)propan-1-one
- CAS Number: 14919-85-8 22198-75-0
- PubChem CID: 31004
- ChemSpider: 28764
- UNII: E5C1642KA2
- CompTox Dashboard (EPA): DTXSID80274909

Chemical and physical data
- Formula: C_{11}H_{14}ClNO
- Molar mass: 211.69 g·mol^{−1}
- 3D model (JSmol): Interactive image
- SMILES: CCNC(C)C(=O)C1=CC=C(C=C1)Cl
- InChI: InChI=1S/C11H14ClNO/c1-3-13-8(2)11(14)9-4-6-10(12)7-5-9/h4-8,13H,3H2,1-2H3; Key:RNBCGEIZCHBTGL-UHFFFAOYSA-N

4-Chloroethcathinone (4-CEC) is an organic chemical compound that is classified as substituted cathinone a stimulant and also probably entactogen. Like other 4-chlorocathinones, it may have the potential for abuse in humans and cause adverse effects similar to those associated with mephedrone. 4-CEC was encountered as a novel designer drug in Europe in 2016.

== Pharmacology ==
=== Pharmacodynamics ===
In studies evaluating rat brain synaptosomes in vitro, 4-CEC demonstrated a strong preference for interacting with the serotonin transporter (SERT) over the dopamine transporter (DAT) and norepinephrine transporter (NET). It acts as a moderate SERT reuptake inhibitor and weak reuptake inhibitor at DAT and NET, while functioning as a substrate at SERT. It behaves primarily as a serotonin-releasing agent with weak norepinephrine release profile. In another study however, 4-CEC was a well-balanced serotonin–dopamine releasing agent (SDRA).

The specific values obtained in the rat synaptosome:

- Monoamine reuptake inhibition:
  - DAT IC_{50}: 1,455–1,574 nM
  - NET IC_{50}: 2,848–3,055 nM
  - SERT IC_{50}: 579–589 nM
- Monoamine release kinetics:
  - DAT EC_{50}: 354 nM or inactive
  - NET EC_{50}: 3,058–5,194 nM (E_{max} = 81%)
  - SERT EC_{50}: 153–191 ± 26 nM (E_{max} = 107%)

4-CEC has been reported to produce hyperlocomotion, a stimulant-like effect, in rodents. It has also been found to fully substitute for methamphetamine and cocaine in rodent drug discrimination tests, further suggesting stimulant-like effects. In addition, the drug has been found to fully substitute for MDMA in rodent drug discrimination tests, suggesting entactogen-like effects as well.

=== Pharmacokinetics ===
In vivo studies show that 4-CEC is characterized by rapid absorption (T_{max} approx. 10 minutes) and quick elimination from plasma (a half-life, t_{1/2}, of approx. 100 minutes).

Tissue distribution profiles indicates that 4-CEC accumulates primarily in the brain, lungs, kidneys, and liver. It is also characterized by multi-organ toxicity.

== Chemistry ==
=== Analogues ===
Analogues of 4-CEC include 4-chlorocathinone (4-CC), 4-chloromethcathinone (4-CMC; clephedrone), 4-chloro-α-pyrrolidinopropiophenone (4-CαPPP), 4-chloroethamphetamine (4-CEA), and mephedrone (4-MMC), among others.

== History ==
4-CEC was encountered as a novel designer drug in Sweden in January 2016.

== Society and culture ==
=== Legal status ===
In Poland, the possession of 4-CEC is prohibited by law; the substance is included in the list of new psychoactive substances (NPS).

== See also ==
- Substituted cathinone
