= Isohexylone =

Substituted cathinone stimulant drug

Identifiers
- IUPAC name: 1-(benzo[d][1,3]dioxol-5-yl)-4-methyl-2-(methylamino)pentan-1-one
- CAS Number: 1157947-89-1
- PubChem CID: 163192846
- ChemSpider: 129558506
- CompTox Dashboard (EPA): DTXSID701337011

Chemical and physical data
- Formula: C_{14}H_{19}NO_{3}
- Molar mass: 249.310 g·mol^{−1}
- 3D model (JSmol): Interactive image
- SMILES: CC(C)CC(NC)C(=O)c1ccc2OCOc2c1
- InChI: InChI=1S/C14H19NO3/c1-9(2)6-11(15-3)14(16)10-4-5-12-13(7-10)18-8-17-12/h4-5,7,9,11,15H,6,8H2,1-3H3; Key:QGIZGJMDLJAAJI-UHFFFAOYSA-N

Isohexylone is a recreational designer drug from the substituted cathinone family, with stimulant effects. It was first identified in the United Kingdom in June 2019.

== See also ==
- Substituted methylenedioxyphenethylamine
- Methylone
- 5-Methylethylone
- Butylone
- Desmethylsibutramine
- Eutylone
- Pentylone
- Ephylone
- N-Ethylhexylone
- α-PHiP
- 3F-PiHP
- UWA-101
