= Chloromethcathinone =

Chloromethcathinone may refer to:

- 2-Chloromethcathinone
- 3-Chloromethcathinone
- 4-Chloromethcathinone

== See also ==
- Fluoromethcathinone
- Bromomethcathinone
