= MDPEP =

Chemical compound

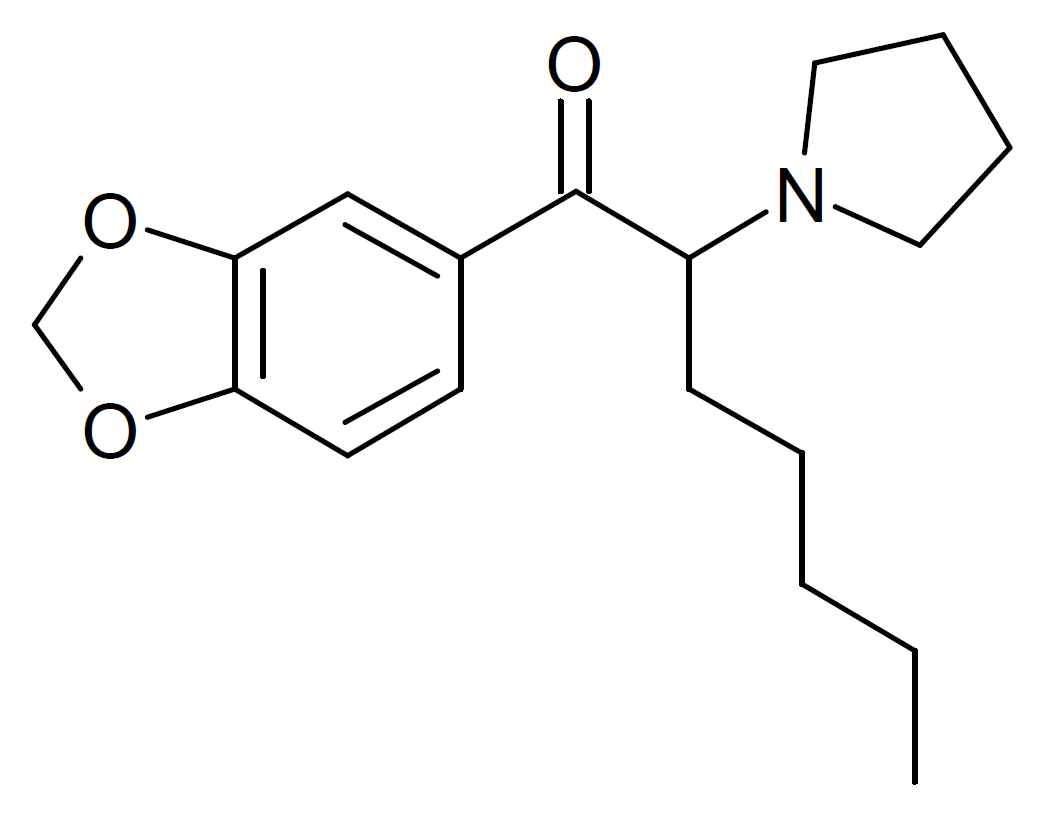

Legal status
- Legal status: DE: Anlage II (Authorized trade only, not prescriptible); UK: Class B

Identifiers
- IUPAC name: 1-(1,3-benzodioxol-5-yl)-2-pyrrolidin-1-ylheptan-1-one
- CAS Number: 746541-09-3 24646-39-7 (HCl)
- PubChem CID: 132520294
- ChemSpider: 95753889
- UNII: L6IDR88RVF

Chemical and physical data
- Formula: C_{18}H_{25}NO_{3}
- Molar mass: 303.402 g·mol^{−1}
- 3D model (JSmol): Interactive image
- SMILES: CCCCCC(C(=O)C1=CC2=C(C=C1)OCO2)N3CCCC3
- InChI: InChI=1S/C18H25NO3/c1-2-3-4-7-15(19-10-5-6-11-19)18(20)14-8-9-16-17(12-14)22-13-21-16/h8-9,12,15H,2-7,10-11,13H2,1H3; Key:APQUWEZHVKBPTI-UHFFFAOYSA-N

MDPEP (also known as MD-PV8 and MDPHPP) is a substituted cathinone derivative with stimulant effects which has been sold as a designer drug. It is the longer chain heptyl homologue of the well known stimulant designer drugs MDPV and MDPHP. It was first identified in Sweden in 2019 and has been relatively widely sold, being the most commonly encountered substituted cathinone derivative found in the US in 2020–2021, though it has still not reached the same levels of use internationally as MDPV and MDPHP.

== See also ==
- Substituted methylenedioxyphenethylamine
- MDPPP
- MDPBP
- Methylone
- Butylone
- N-Ethylheptylone
- 4F-PV9
