= C11H14FNO =

The molecular formula C_{11}H_{14}FNO (molar mass: 195.233 g/mol, exact mass: 195.1059 u) may refer to:

- 4-Fluoroethcathinone (4-FEC)
- 3-Fluorophenmetrazine (3-FPM)
