= Hexedrone =

Stimulant of the substituted cathinone class

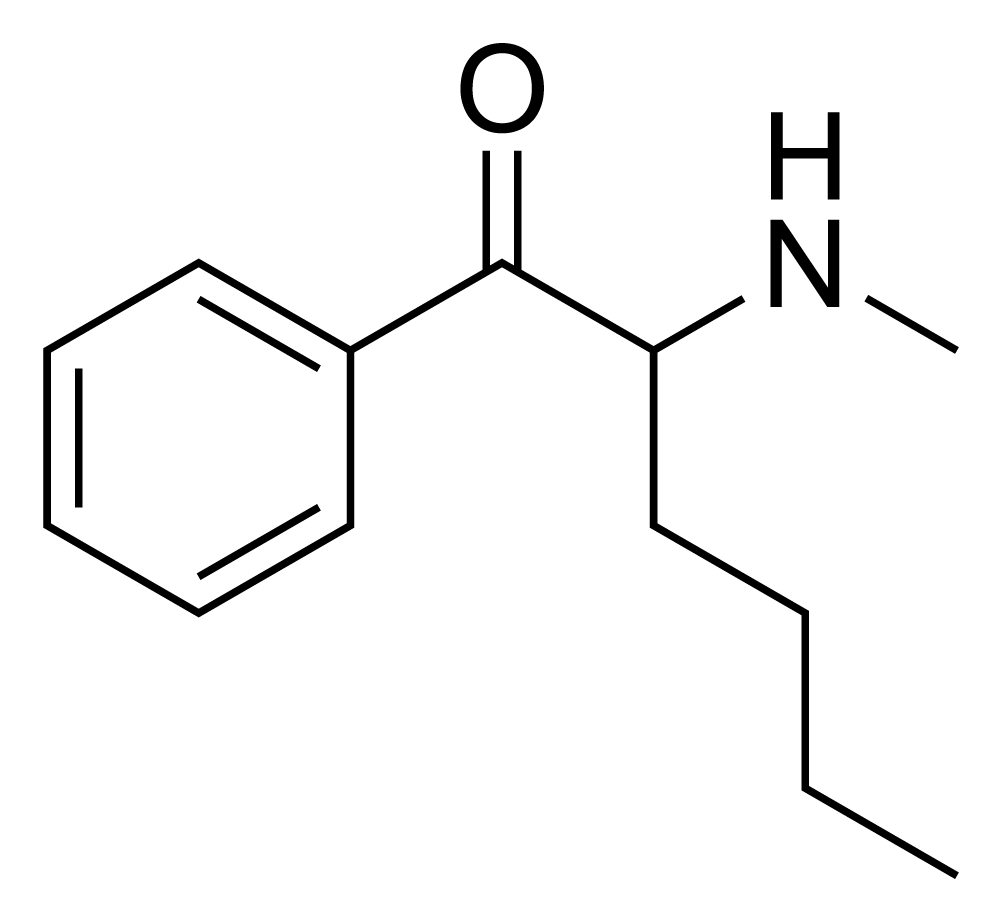

Names
- IUPAC name 2-(Methylamino)-1-phenylhexan-1-one
- Other names Hexedrone, HEX

Identifiers
CAS Number	2169446-41-5
3D model (JSmol)	Interactive image
ChemSpider	67169739
PubChem CID	129844496
UNII	KLF7T8YQP5
CompTox Dashboard (EPA)	DTXSID601336034
- InChI: InChI=1S/C13H19NO/c1-3-4-10-12(14-2)13(15)11-8-6-5-7-9-11/h5-9,12,14H,3-4,10H2,1-2H3 Key: BHIZKPHLTVLXIV-UHFFFAOYSA-N
- SMILES: CCCCC(C(=O)C1=CC=CC=C1)NC

Properties
Chemical formula	C_{13}H_{19}NO
Molar mass	205.301 g·mol^{−1}
Appearance	White crystalline solid
- Except where otherwise noted, data are given for materials in their standard state (at 25 °C [77 °F], 100 kPa). Infobox references

Hexadrone is a stimulant of the substituted cathinone class which has been sold as a designer drug. Through analysis of the Structure-Activity Relationships in similar cathinones such as MDPV, hexedrone is believed to be a norepinephrine–dopamine reuptake inhibitor.

Subjective effects include stimulation, disinhibition, thought acceleration and euphoria.

Little is known about toxicity, addiction, and abuse potential of hexedrone. Due to its novelty and extremely short history of human usage, all information related to the use of this compound should be treated with caution.

== Legal status ==
In the UK, Hexedrone is a Class B drug under The Misuse of Drugs Act 1971 (Amendment) Order 2010 following the ACMD's report on substituted cathinone derivatives, making it illegal to sell, buy, or possess without a license.

== See also ==
- Ethyl-Hexedrone
- Methcathinone
- Buphedrone
- Pentedrone
