= 3-Chloro-N-cyclopropylcathinone =

Clinical data
- Other names: 3Cl-CpC; 3′-Chloro-2-(cyclopropylamino)-propanophenone; 2-(N-Cyclopropylamino)-3-chloropropiophenone; PAL-433; PAL433; RTI-6037-39
- Drug class: Stimulant; Serotonin releasing agent; Serotonin–norepinephrine–dopamine reuptake inhibitor
- ATC code: None

Identifiers
- IUPAC name: 1-(3-chlorophenyl)-2-(cyclopropylamino)propan-1-one
- CAS Number: 1193779-70-2
- PubChem CID: 44543271
- ChemSpider: 24631232
- ChEMBL: ChEMBL569700

Chemical and physical data
- Formula: C_{12}H_{14}ClNO
- Molar mass: 223.70 g·mol^{−1}
- 3D model (JSmol): Interactive image
- SMILES: CC(C(=O)C1=CC(=CC=C1)Cl)NC2CC2
- InChI: InChI=1S/C12H14ClNO/c1-8(14-11-5-6-11)12(15)9-3-2-4-10(13)7-9/h2-4,7-8,11,14H,5-6H2,1H3; Key:YKOZIWZLLJVPPD-UHFFFAOYSA-N

3-Chloro-N-cyclopropylcathinone (3Cl-CpC; code names PAL-433, RTI-6037-39) is a stimulant and hybrid monoamine releasing agent and monoamine reuptake inhibitor of the cathinone family related to bupropion (3-chloro-N-tert-butylcathinone).

It acts specifically as a dual serotonin releasing agent (SRA) and serotonin–norepinephrine–dopamine reuptake inhibitor (SNDRI). Its EC_{50} for induction of serotonin release is 1,328 nM, whereas its IC_{50} values for monoamine reuptake inhibition are 265 to 533 nM for dopamine, 2,150 nM for norepinephrine, and 3,180 nM for serotonin. The drug produces psychostimulant-like effects in animals, with a slow onset of action and a long duration of action. The activities of the individual enantiomers of 3Cl-CpC, (−)-3Cl-CpC (PAL-1122) and (+)-3Cl-CpC (PAL-1123), have also been reported.

3Cl-CpC was first described in the scientific literature by 2009. It was being investigated by the National Institute on Drug Abuse (NIDA) as a potential treatment of stimulant dependence, including cocaine dependence specifically.

== See also ==
- Substituted cathinone
- 3-Chlorocathinone
- 3-Chloromethcathinone
- RTI-6037-13
