= Substituted cathinone =

Class of chemical compounds

Cathinone

General chemical structure of substituted cathinones, with R_{1}-R_{4} defined in text

Substituted cathinones, or simply cathinones, which include some stimulants and entactogens, are derivatives of cathinone. They feature a phenethylamine core with an alkyl group attached to the alpha carbon, and a ketone group attached to the beta carbon, along with additional substitutions. Cathinone occurs naturally in the plant khat whose leaves are chewed as a recreational drug.

Substituted cathinones act as monoamine releasing agents and/or monoamine reuptake inhibitors, including norepinephrine, dopamine, and/or serotonin. In contrast to substituted amphetamines, most substituted cathinones do not act as agonists of the human trace amine-associated receptor 1 (TAAR1). This may potentiate their stimulating and addictive effects. In addition, β-keto-substituted phenethylamines, such as βk-2C-B, appear to show dramatically reduced potency and efficacy as serotonin 5-HT_{2A} receptor agonists compared to their non-β-keto-substituted counterparts.

== Monoamine release profiles ==
The following is a list of serotonin, dopamine, and norepinephrine releasing profiles for various cathinones, measured in rat brain synaptosomes.

Monoamine release profiles of cathinones in rat brain synaptosomes (EC_{50}, nM)
Name	PAL #	Serotonin	Norepinephrine	Dopamine	Type	References
2-BMC	ND	2837	156	650	NDRA	
2-CMC	ND	2815	93	179	NDRA	
2-FMC	ND	>10000	ND (85% at 10 μM)	48.7	NDRA	
2-MeO-MC	ND	7220	339	920	NDRA	
2-MMC	ND	347–490	53	81–97.9	SNDRA	
2-TFMeO-MC	ND	>10000	ND (33% at 10 μM)	>10000	IA	
2-TFMMC (2-TFMAP)	ND	8400–>10000	2200 (69% at 10 μM)	8000–>10000	SNDRA	
3-BCPC	PAL-586	621	ND	IA (RI)	ND	
3-BMC	ND	136–137	25	21–28.0	SNDRA	
3-CC	ND	567	105	64	SNDRA	
3-CCPC (RTI-6037-39)	PAL-433	1328	ND	IA (RI)	ND	
(–)-3-CCPC	PAL-1122	562	ND	IA (RI)	ND	
(+)-3-CCPC	PAL-1123	733	ND	IA (RI)	ND	
3-CEC	PAL-361	IA	ND	IA	ND	
3-Cl-4-Me-CPC	PAL-820	181	ND	IA (RI)	ND	
3-CMC (clophedrone)	PAL-434	211–410	19–54.4	26–46.8	SNDRA	
3-CPC	PAL-363	IA	ND	IA (RI)	ND	
3-FMC	ND	1460	ND (100% at 10 μM)	64.8	NDRA	
3-MCPC	PAL-588	1067	ND	IA (RI)	ND	
3-MeO-CPC	PAL-591	1014	ND	IA (RI)	ND	
3-MeO-MC	ND	306–683	111 (68% at 10 μM)	109–129	SNDRA	
3-MMC	ND	268–292	27	28–70.6	SNDRA	
3-TFMeO-MC	ND	188	ND (79% at 10 μM)	729	SNDRA	
3-TFMMC (3-TFMAP)	ND	297–380	2700 (78% at 10 μM)	610–1290	SNDRA	
3,4-DCCPC	PAL-787	356	ND	IA (RI)	ND	
4-BMC (brephedrone)	ND	42.5–60.2	100	59.4	SNDRA	
4-CC	ND	128.4	85.1	221.8	SNDRA	
4-CCPC	PAL-743	1632	ND	IA (RI)	ND	
4-CEC	ND	152.6	5194.0	353.6	SDRA	
4-CMC (clephedrone)	ND	71.1–144	44–90.9	42.2–74.7	SNDRA	
4-FMC (flephedrone)	ND	1290–1450	62	83.4–119	NDRA	
4-MCPC	PAL-744	667	ND	IA (RI)	ND	
4-MeO-MC (methedrone)	ND	120–195	111	506–881	SNDRA	
4-tBu-MC	ND	IA	ND	942 (E _{max} ≈ 50%)	ND	
4-TFMeO-MC	ND	118	ND	7510	ND	
4-TFMMC (4-TFMAP)	ND	190–270	900	2700–4230	SNRA	
α-Me-MC (βk-mephentermine; RAD-081)	ND	12860	153	590	NDRA	
AMAPN	ND	21	ND	55	ND	
Amfepramone (diethylpropion)	ND	>10000	>10000	>10000	PD	
BMAPN	ND	27	ND	34	ND	
Buphedrone (βk-MEPEA)	PAL-429	IA	ND	411	ND	
Bupropion (amfebutamone)	ND	IA (RI)	IA (RI)	IA (RI)	NDRI	
Butylone (βk-MBDB)	ND	330	IA (RI)	IA (RI)	SRA/NDRI	
Cathinone (C; βk-AMPH)	ND	6100–7595	23.6–25.6	34.8–83.1	NDRA	
D-Cathinone	ND	>10000	72.0	183.9	NDRA	
L-Cathinone	ND	2366–9267	12.4–28	18–24.6	NDRA	
Dibutylone	ND	IA	IA (RI)	IA (RI)	DRI	
EDMC	ND	347	327	496	SNDRA	
Ephylone	ND	IA (RI)	IA (RI)	IA (RI)	IA (NDRI)	
Ethcathinone (EC)	ND	1923–2118	88.3–99.3	267.6–>1000	NRA	
Ethylone (βk-MDEA)	ND	617.4	4251	1122	SNDRA	
Eutylone (βk-EBDB)	ND	1020	IA (RI)	IA (RI)	SRA/NDRI	
HHMC	ND	14100	110	90	NDRA	
HDMI	ND	7210	6340	5840	SNDRA	
MDC	ND	966	394	370	SNDRA	
Mephedrone (4-MMC)	ND	118.3–122	58–62.7	49.1–51	SNDRA	
S(–)-Mephedrone	ND	61	ND	74	ND	
R(+)-Mephedrone	ND	1470	ND	31	ND	
Methcathinone (MC)	ND	2592–5853	22–26.1	12.5–49.9	NDRA	
D-Methcathinone	ND	IA	ND	ND	NRA	
L-Methcathinone	ND	1772	13.1	14.8	NDRA	
Methylone (MDMC)	ND	234–708	140–270	117–220	SNDRA	
Mexedrone (4-MMC-MeO)	ND	2525	IA (RI)	IA (RI)	SRA/NDRI	
Normephedrone (4-MC)	ND	210	100	220	SNDRA	
R(+)-Normephedrone	ND	179	89	150	SNDRA	
S(–)-Normephedrone	ND	1592	115	391	NDRA	
Pentylone	ND	476–1030 (E_{max} ≈ 50%)	IA (RI)	IA (RI)	SRA/NDRI	
Propylone	ND	3128	IA (RI)	975.9	SDRA	

== List of substituted cathinones ==
The derivatives may be produced by substitutions at four locations of the cathinone molecule:

- R_{1} = hydrogen, or any combination of one or more alkyl, alkoxy, alkylenedioxy, haloalkyl or halide substituents
- R_{2} = hydrogen or any alkyl group
- R_{3} = hydrogen, any alkyl group, or incorporation in a cyclic structure
- R_{4} = hydrogen, any alkyl group, or incorporation in a cyclic structure

The following table displays notable derivatives that have been reported:

Structure	Compound	R_{1}	R_{2}	R_{3}	R_{4}	CAS #
	Cathinone	H	Me	H	H	71031-15-7
	Methcathinone	H	Me	H	Me	5650-44-2
	Ethcathinone	H	Me	H	Et	51553-17-4
	Propylcathinone	H	Me	H	nPr	52597-14-5
	Buphedrone	H	Et	H	Me	408332-79-6
	N-Ethylbuphedrone (NEB)	H	Et	H	Et	1354631-28-9
	N-Methyl-N-ethylbuphedrone	H	Et	Me	Et	
	Pentedrone	H	nPr	H	Me	879722-57-3
	N-Ethylpentedrone	H	nPr	H	Et	18268-16-1
	N-Isopropylpentedrone	H	nPr	H	iPr	18268-14-9
	Hexedrone	H	nBu	H	Me	2169446-41-5
	N-Ethylhexedrone	H	nBu	H	Et	18410-62-3
	N-Butylhexedrone	H	nBu	H	nBu	18296-66-7
	N-Isobutylhexedrone (NDH)	H	nBu	H	i-Bu	
	Isohexedrone	H	iBu	H	Me	
	N-Ethylheptedrone	H	nPe	H	Et	
	Octedrone	H	hexyl	H	Me	
	Dimethylcathinone	H	Me	Me	Me	15351-09-4
	Diethylpropion	H	Me	Et	Et	134-80-5
	N-Methyl-N-ethylcathinone	H	Me	Me	Et	1157739-24-6
	Bupropion	3-Cl	Me	H	t-Bu	34911-55-2
	Hydroxybupropion	3-Cl	Me	H	2-Me-3-OH-propan-2-yl	357399-43-0
	Mephedrone	4-Me	Me	H	Me	1189805-46-6
	2-MMC	2-Me	Me	H	Me	1246911-71-6
	2-MEC	2-Me	Me	H	Et	1439439-84-5
	2-EMC	2-Et	Me	H	Me	
	2-EEC	2-Et	Me	H	Et	2446466-59-5
	3-MMC	3-Me	Me	H	Me	1246816-62-5
	3-MEC	3-Me	Me	H	Et	1439439-83-4
	3-MPC	3-Me	Me	H	nPr	
	3-EMC	3-Et	Me	H	Me	
	3-EEC	3-Et	Me	H	Et	2446466-61-9
	4-EMC	4-Et	Me	H	Me	1225622-14-9
	4-EEC	4-Et	Me	H	Et	2446466-62-0
	4-MC	4-Me	Me	H	H	31952-47-3
	Benzedrone	4-Me	Me	H	Bn	1225617-75-3
	2'-MeO-Benzedrone	4-Me	Me	H	2-MeO-Bn	
	2,N-Dimethylbenzedrone	2-Me	Me	Me	Bn	
	3,N-Dimethylbenzedrone	3-Me	Me	Me	Bn	
	4,N-Dimethylbenzedrone	4-Me	Me	Me	Bn	
	4-MEC	4-Me	Me	H	Et	1225617-18-4
	4-MPC	4-Me	Me	H	nPr	
	N,N-DMMC	4-Me	Me	Me	Me	1448845-14-4
	N,N-MEMC	4-Me	Me	Me	Et	
	N,N-DEMC	4-Me	Me	Et	Et	676316-90-8
	4-MEAP	4-Me	Pr	H	Et	746540-82-9
	EDMC	4-Et	Me	Me	Me	
	2,3-DMMC	2,3-dimethyl	Me	H	Me	
	2,3-DMEC	2,3-dimethyl	Me	H	Et	
	2,4-DMMC	2,4-dimethyl	Me	H	Me	1225623-63-1
	2,4-DMEC	2,4-dimethyl	Me	H	Et	1225913-88-1
	2,5-DMMC	2,5-dimethyl	Me	H	Me	
	2,5-DMEC	2,5-dimethyl	Me	H	Et	
	2,6-DMMC	2,6-dimethyl	Me	H	Me	
	2,6-DMEC	2,6-dimethyl	Me	H	Et	
	3,4-DMMC	3,4-dimethyl	Me	H	Me	1082110-00-6
	3,4-DMEC	3,4-dimethyl	Me	H	Et	1225811-81-3
	3,5-DMEC	3,5-dimethyl	Me	H	Et	
	2,4,5-TMMC	2,4,5-trimethyl	Me	H	Me	1368603-85-3
	2,4,5-TMOMC	2,4,5-trimethoxy	Me	H	Me	
	3,4,5-TMOMC	3,4,5-trimethoxy	Me	H	Me	
	Methedrone	4-MeO	Me	H	Me	530-54-1
	Dimethedrone	4-MeO	Me	Me	Me	91564-39-5
	Ethedrone	4-MeO	Me	H	Et	
	2-MOMC	2-MeO	Me	H	Me	
	3-MOMC	3-MeO	Me	H	Me	1435933-70-2
	3-FC	3-F	Me	H	H	1082949-91-4
	4-FC	4-F	Me	H	H	80096-51-1
	2-FMC	2-F	Me	H	Me	1186137-35-8
	2-FEC	2-F	Me	H	Et	
	3-FMC	3-F	Me	H	Me	1049677-77-1
	3-FEC	3-F	Me	H	Et	
	2-CMC	2-Cl	Me	H	Me	
	2-BMC	2-Br	Me	H	Me	
	2-IMC	2-I	Me	H	Me	
	2-TFMAP	2-CF_{3}	Me	H	Me	
	Clophedrone (3-CMC)	3-Cl	Me	H	Me	1049677-59-9
	3-CEC	3-Cl	Me	H	Et	2150476-60-9
	3-BMC	3-Br	Me	H	Me	676487-42-6
	3-IMC	3-I	Me	H	Me	
	3-TFMAP	3-CF_{3}	Me	H	Me	
	Flephedrone	4-F	Me	H	Me	447-40-5
	4-FEC	4-F	Me	H	Et	1225625-74-0
	Clephedrone (4-CMC)	4-Cl	Me	H	Me	1225843-86-6
	2-CEC	2-Cl	Me	H	Et	
	4-CEC	4-Cl	Me	H	Et	14919-85-8
	2-CiPC	2-Cl	Me	H	iPr	
	3-CiPC	3-Cl	Me	H	iPr	
	4-CiPC	4-Cl	Me	H	iPr	
	4-CBC	4-Cl	Me	H	nBu	1225621-71-5
	2-CDMC	2-Cl	Me	Me	Me	
	3-CDMC	3-Cl	Me	Me	Me	
	4-CDMC	4-Cl	Me	Me	Me	1157667-29-2
	Brephedrone	4-Br	Me	H	Me	486459-03-4
	4-BEC	4-Br	Me	H	Et	135333-26-5
	4-IMC	4-I	Me	H	Me	
	4-TFMAP	4-CF_{3}	Me	H	Me	
	4-EFMC	4-(2-fluoroethyl)	Me	H	Me	
	4-MTMC	4-SCH_{3}	Me	H	Me	
	4-MSMC	4-SO_{2}CH_{3}	Me	H	Me	
	4-PHMC	4-phenyl	Me	H	Me	
	Mexedrone	4-Me	methoxymethyl	H	Me	
	FMMC	3-F-4-Me	Me	H	Me	1696642-00-8
	MFMC	3-Me-4-F	Me	H	Me	1368943-21-8
	4-Cl-3-MMC	3-Me-4-Cl	Me	H	Me	
	MMOMC	3-Me-4-MeO	Me	H	Me	
	3,4-DCMC	3,4-dichloro	Me	H	Me	802281-39-6
	3,4-DCEC	3,4-dichloro	Me	H	Et	1225618-63-2
	3,5-DCMC	3,5-dichloro	Me	H	Me	
	3,5-DFMC	3,5-difluoro	Me	H	Me	1430343-55-7
	2,5-DMOMC	2,5-dimethoxy	Me	H	Me	
	βk-2C-C	2,5-dimethoxy-4-chloro	H	H	H	1538191-15-9
	βk-2C-B	2,5-dimethoxy-4-bromo	H	H	H	807631-09-0
	βk-2C-I	2,5-dimethoxy-4-iodo	H	H	H	
	βk-2C-D	2,5-dimethoxy-4-methyl	H	H	H	1368627-25-1
	βk-2C-E	2,5-dimethoxy-4-ethyl	H	H	H	1517021-02-1
	βk-2C-P	2,5-dimethoxy-4-propyl	H	H	H	
	βk-2C-iP	2,5-dimethoxy-4-isopropyl	H	H	H	1511033-62-7
	βk-DOB	2,5-dimethoxy-4-bromo	Me	H	H	?
	βk-MDOM	2,5-dimethoxy-4-methyl	Me	H	Me	
	βk-MDA	3,4-methylenedioxy	Me	H	H	80535-73-5
	N-Acetyl-βk-MDA	3,4-methylenedioxy	Me	H	acetyl	
	2,3-MDMC	2,3-methylenedioxy	Me	H	Me	1427205-87-5
	Methylone	3,4-methylenedioxy	Me	H	Me	186028-79-5
	Dimethylone	3,4-methylenedioxy	Me	Me	Me	109367-07-9
	N-Acetylmethylone	3,4-methylenedioxy	Me	acetyl	Me	
	N-Hydroxymethylone	3,4-methylenedioxy	Me	hydroxy	Me	
	Ethylone	3,4-methylenedioxy	Me	H	Et	1112937-64-0
	Diethylone	3,4-methylenedioxy	Me	Et	Et	
	N-Acetylethylone	3,4-methylenedioxy	Me	acetyl	Et	
	N-Isopropyl-βk-MDA	3,4-methylenedioxy	Me	H	iPr	
	MDPT (tertylone)	3,4-methylenedioxy	Me	H	t-Bu	186028-84-2
	Benzylone (BMDP)	3,4-methylenedioxy	Me	H	Bn	1823274-68-5
	N-Cyclohexylmethylone	3,4-methylenedioxy	Me	H	cyclohexyl	
	3,4-EDMC	3,4-ethylenedioxy	Me	H	Me	30253-44-2
	βk-IMP	3,4-trimethylene	Me	H	Me	100608-69-3
	βk-IBP	3,4-trimethylene	Et	H	Et	
	βk-IVP	3,4-trimethylene	nPr	H	Et	
	3-Fluorobuphedrone	3-F	Et	H	Me	
	4-Fluorobuphedrone	4-F	Et	H	Me	1368599-12-5
	4-Bromobuphedrone	4-Br	Et	H	Me	
	3-Methylbuphedrone	3-Me	Et	H	Me	1797911-07-9
	4-Me-MABP	4-Me	Et	H	Me	1336911-98-8
	4-Me-NEB	4-Me	Et	H	Et	18268-19-4
	2-F-NEB	2-F	Et	H	Et	
	3F-NEB	3-F	Et	H	Et	
	4-F-NEB	4-F	Et	H	Et	
	4-Me-DMB	4-Me	Et	Me	Me	
	3,4-DMEB	3,4-dimethyl	Et	H	Et	
	4-Methoxybuphedrone	4-MeO	Et	H	Me	
	Butylone	3,4-methylenedioxy	Et	H	Me	802575-11-7
	Eutylone	3,4-methylenedioxy	Et	H	Et	802855-66-9
	βk-PBDB	3,4-methylenedioxy	Et	H	nPr	
	Bn-4-MeMABP	4-Me	Et	H	Bn	1445751-39-2
	BMDB	3,4-methylenedioxy	Et	H	Bn	1445751-47-2
	N-Cyclohexylbutylone	3,4-methylenedioxy	Et	H	cyclohexyl	
	βk-DMBDB	3,4-methylenedioxy	Et	Me	Me	802286-83-5
	βk-MMDMA	3,4-methylenedioxy-5-MeO	Me	H	Me	2230716-98-8
	βk-MMDMA-2	2-MeO-3,4-methylenedioxy	Me	H	Me	
	βk-DMMDA	2,5-diMeO-3,4-methylenedioxy	Me	H	H	
	5-Methylmethylone	3,4-methylenedioxy-5-Me	Me	H	Me	1364933-83-4
	5-Methylethylone	3,4-methylenedioxy-5-Me	Me	H	Et	1364933-82-3
	2-Methylbutylone	2-Me-3,4-methylenedioxy	Et	H	Me	1364933-86-7
	5-Methylbutylone	3,4-methylenedioxy-5-Me	Et	H	Me	1354631-29-0
	Pentylone	3,4-methylenedioxy	nPr	H	Me	698963-77-8
	N-Ethylpentylone	3,4-methylenedioxy	nPr	H	Et	727641-67-0
	N-propylpentylone	3,4-methylenedioxy	nPr	H	nPr	
	N-butylpentylone	3,4-methylenedioxy	nPr	H	nBu	
	2,3-Dipentylone	2,3-methylenedioxy	nPr	Me	Me	
	Dipentylone	3,4-methylenedioxy	nPr	Me	Me	17763-13-2
	N,N-Diethylnorpentylone	3,4-methylenedioxy	nPr	Et	Et	
	Hexylone	3,4-methylenedioxy	nBu	H	Me	
	Isohexylone	3,4-methylenedioxy	iBu	H	Me	1157947-89-1
	Isoheptylone	3,4-methylenedioxy	iPe	H	Me	
	N-Ethylhexylone	3,4-methylenedioxy	nBu	H	Et	27912-41-0
	N-Ethylheptylone	3,4-methylenedioxy	nPe	H	Et	
	4-MEAP	4-Me	nPr	H	Et	746540-82-9
	3,4-DMEP	3,4-dimethyl	nPr	H	Et	
	2-F-Pentedrone	2-F	nPr	H	Me	
	3-F-Pentedrone	3-F	nPr	H	Me	
	4-F-Pentedrone	4-F	nPr	H	Me	
	4-Cl-Pentedrone	4-Cl	nPr	H	Me	2167949-43-9
	4-Methylpentedrone	4-Me	nPr	H	Me	1373918-61-6
	DL-4662	3,4-dimethoxy	nPr	H	Et	1674389-55-9
	4-F-iPr-norpentedrone	4-F	nPr	H	iPr	
	3-CBV	3-Cl	nPr	H	tBu	
	4-methylhexedrone	4-Me	nBu	H	Me	
	MEH	4-Me	nBu	H	Et	
	3F-NEH	3-F	nBu	H	Et	
	4-F-hexedrone	4-F	nBu	H	Me	
	4-F-octedrone	4-F	hexyl	H	Me	
	α-phenylmephedrone	4-Me	phenyl	H	Me	
	βk-Ephenidine	H	phenyl	H	Et	22312-16-9
	BMAPN	β-naphthyl instead of phenyl	Me	H	Me	
	βk-Methiopropamine	thiophen-2-yl instead of phenyl	Me	H	Me	24065-17-6
	5-Cl-bk-MPA	5-chlorothiophen-2-yl instead of phenyl	Me	H	Me	
	βk-5-MAPB	benzofuran-5-yl instead of phenyl	Me	H	Me	
	βk-6-MAPB	benzofuran-6-yl instead of phenyl	Me	H	Me	
	βk-5-IT	indol-5-yl instead of phenyl	Me	H	H	1369231-36-6
	α-Phthalimidopropiophenone	H	Me	phthalimido		19437-20-8
	PPPO	H	Me	piperidinyl		
	PPBO	H	Et	piperidinyl		92728-82-0
	FPPVO	4-F	nPr	piperidinyl		
	3,4-Pr-PipVP	3,4-trimethylene	nPr	piperidinyl		
	MDPV-azepane	3,4-methylenedioxy	nPr	azepane		
	Caccure 907	4-SCH_{3}	α,α-di-Me	morpholinyl		
	α-PPP	H	Me	pyrrolidinyl		19134-50-0
	α-PBP	H	Et	pyrrolidinyl		13415-54-8
	α-PVP (O-2387)	H	nPr	pyrrolidinyl		14530-33-7
	α-PHP	H	nBu	pyrrolidinyl		13415-86-6
	α-PHiP	H	iBu	pyrrolidinyl		
	α-PEP (α-PHPP)	H	nPe	pyrrolidinyl		13415-83-3
	α-POP	H	hexyl	pyrrolidinyl		
	α-PNP	H	heptyl	pyrrolidinyl		
	DPPE (Alpha-D2PV)	H	phenyl	pyrrolidinyl		27590-61-0
	α-PcPeP	H	cyclopentyl	pyrrolidinyl		
	α-PCYP	H	cyclohexyl	pyrrolidinyl		1803168-11-7
	2-MePPP	2-Me	Me	pyrrolidinyl		2092429-83-7
	3-MePPP	3-Me	Me	pyrrolidinyl		1214940-01-8
	4-MePPP	4-Me	Me	pyrrolidinyl		1313393-58-6
	3-MeO-PPP	3-MeO	Me	pyrrolidinyl		
	MOPPP	4-MeO	Me	pyrrolidinyl		478243-09-3
	3-F-PPP	3-F	Me	pyrrolidinyl		1214939-99-7
	FPPP	4-F	Me	pyrrolidinyl		28117-76-2
	Cl-PPP	4-Cl	Me	pyrrolidinyl		93307-24-5
	3-Br-PPP	3-Br	Me	pyrrolidinyl		
	Br-PPP	4-Br	Me	pyrrolidinyl		
	2,3-DMPPP	2,3-dimethyl	Me	pyrrolidinyl		
	2,4-DMPPP	2,4-dimethyl	Me	pyrrolidinyl		
	3,4-DMPPP	3,4-dimethyl	Me	pyrrolidinyl		
	3-MPBP	3-Me	Et	pyrrolidinyl		1373918-60-5
	3-F-PBP	3-F	Et	pyrrolidinyl		1373918-59-2
	MPBP	4-Me	Et	pyrrolidinyl		732180-91-5
	FPBP	4-F	Et	pyrrolidinyl		1373918-67-2
	EPBP	4-Et	Et	pyrrolidinyl		
	MOPBP	4-MeO	Et	pyrrolidinyl		
	MMOPBP	3-Me-4-MeO	Et	pyrrolidinyl		
	O-2384	3,4-dichloro	Et	pyrrolidinyl		850352-65-7
	2-Me-PVP	2-Me	nPr	pyrrolidinyl		850352-54-4
	3-Me-PVP	3-Me	nPr	pyrrolidinyl		13415-85-5
	Pyrovalerone (O-2371)	4-Me	nPr	pyrrolidinyl		3563-49-3
	4-Et-PVP	4-Et	nPr	pyrrolidinyl		
	3F-PVP	3-F	nPr	pyrrolidinyl		2725852-55-9
	FPVP	4-F	nPr	pyrrolidinyl		850352-31-7
	2-Cl-PVP	2-Cl	nPr	pyrrolidinyl		
	3-Cl-PVP	3-Cl	nPr	pyrrolidinyl		
	4-Cl-PVP	4-Cl	nPr	pyrrolidinyl		5537-17-7
	3-Br-PVP	3-Br	nPr	pyrrolidinyl		
	4-Br-PVP	4-Br	nPr	pyrrolidinyl		
	MOPVP	4-MeO	nPr	pyrrolidinyl		5537-19-9
	DMOPVP	3,4-dimethoxy	nPr	pyrrolidinyl		850442-84-1
	DMPVP	3,4-dimethyl	nPr	pyrrolidinyl		
	O-2390	3,4-dichloro	nPr	pyrrolidinyl		850352-61-3
	MFPVP	3-methyl-4-fluoro	nPr	pyrrolidinyl		
	MPHP	4-Me	nBu	pyrrolidinyl		34138-58-4
	3F-PHP	3-F	nBu	pyrrolidinyl		
	4F-PHP	4-F	nBu	pyrrolidinyl		2230706-09-7
	4-Cl-PHP	4-Cl	nBu	pyrrolidinyl		2748592-29-0
	DMOPHP	3,4-dimethoxy	nBu	pyrrolidinyl		
	MFPHP	3-Me-4-F	nBu	pyrrolidinyl		
	3F-PiHP	3-F	iBu	pyrrolidinyl		
	4F-PiHP	4-F	iBu	pyrrolidinyl		
	O-2494	4-Me	iBu	pyrrolidinyl		850352-51-1
	MPEP	4-Me	pentyl	pyrrolidinyl		
	4F-PV8	4-F	pentyl	pyrrolidinyl		
	4-MeO-PV8	4-MeO	pentyl	pyrrolidinyl		
	MFPEP	3-Me-4-F	pentyl	pyrrolidinyl		
	MCPEP	3-Me-4-Cl	pentyl	pyrrolidinyl		
	4F-PV9	4-F	hexyl	pyrrolidinyl		
	4-MeO-PV9	4-MeO	hexyl	pyrrolidinyl		
	α-Phenylpyrovalerone	4-Me	phenyl	pyrrolidinyl		
	MDPPP	3,4-methylenedioxy	Me	pyrrolidinyl		783241-66-7
	MDMPP	3,4-methylenedioxy	α,α-di-Me	pyrrolidinyl		
	MDPBP	3,4-methylenedioxy	Et	pyrrolidinyl		784985-33-7
	MDPV	3,4-methylenedioxy	nPr	pyrrolidinyl		687603-66-3
	2,3-MDPV	2,3-methylenedioxy	nPr	pyrrolidinyl		
	5-Me-MDPV	3,4-methylenedioxy-5-Me	nPr	pyrrolidinyl		
	6-Me-MDPV	2-Me-4,5-methylenedioxy	nPr	pyrrolidinyl		
	6-MeO-MDPV	2-MeO-4,5-methylenedioxy	nPr	pyrrolidinyl		
	Br-MeO-MDPV	2,3-methylenedioxy-4-MeO-5-Br	nPr	pyrrolidinyl		
	MDPiVP	3,4-methylenedioxy	iPr	pyrrolidinyl		
	MDPHP	3,4-methylenedioxy	nBu	pyrrolidinyl		776994-64-0
	MDPHiP	3,4-methylenedioxy	iBu	pyrrolidinyl		
	MDPEP (MD-PV8)	3,4-methylenedioxy	pentyl	pyrrolidinyl		24646-39-7
	MDPOP (MD-PV9)	3,4-methylenedioxy	hexyl	pyrrolidinyl		24646-40-0
	3,4-EtPV	3,4-dimethylene	nPr	pyrrolidinyl		
	5-PPDi	3,4-trimethylene	Et	pyrrolidinyl		
	Indanyl-α-PVP	3,4-trimethylene	nPr	pyrrolidinyl		2748590-83-0
	5-BPDi	3,4-trimethylene	nBu	pyrrolidinyl		
	IPPV	3,4-trimethylene	phenyl	pyrrolidinyl		
	TH-PBP	3,4-tetramethylene	Et	pyrrolidinyl		
	TH-PVP	3,4-tetramethylene	nPr	pyrrolidinyl		2304915-07-7
	TH-PHP	3,4-tetramethylene	nBu	pyrrolidinyl		
	5-DBFPV	2,3-dihydrobenzofuran-5-yl instead of Ph	nPr	pyrrolidinyl		1620807-94-4
	BOD-PVP	benzoxadiazole instead of Ph	nPr	pyrrolidinyl		
	3-BF-PVP	benzofuran-3-yl instead of Ph	nPr	pyrrolidinyl		
	Naphyrone (O-2482)	β-naphthyl instead of phenyl	nPr	pyrrolidinyl		850352-53-3
	α-Naphyrone	α-naphthyl instead of phenyl	nPr	pyrrolidinyl		
	α-PPT	thiophen-2-yl instead of phenyl	Me	pyrrolidinyl		
	α-PBT	thiophen-2-yl instead of phenyl	Et	pyrrolidinyl		
	α-PVT	thiophen-2-yl instead of phenyl	nPr	pyrrolidinyl		1400742-66-6

== Legality ==
On 2 April 2010, the Advisory Council on the Misuse of Drugs in the UK announced that a broad structure-based ban of this entire class of compounds would be instituted, following extensive publicity around grey-market sales and recreational use of mephedrone, a common member of the family. This ban covers compounds with the aforementioned general structure, with 28 compounds specifically named.

"Any compound (not being bupropion or a substance for the time being specified in paragraph 2.2) structurally derived from 2-amino-1-phenyl-1-propanone by modification in any of the following ways, that is to say,

(i) by substitution in the phenyl ring to any extent with alkyl, alkoxy, alkylenedioxy, haloalkyl or halide substituents, whether or not further substituted in the phenyl ring by one or more other univalent substituents;

(ii) by substitution at the 3-position with an alkyl substituent;

(iii) by substitution at the nitrogen atom with alkyl or dialkyl groups, or by inclusion of the nitrogen atom in a cyclic structure."

— ACMD, 2 April 2010

This text was added as an amendment to the Misuse of Drugs Act 1971, to come into force on 16 April 2010. Note that four of the above compounds (cathinone, methcathinone, diethylpropion and pyrovalerone) were already illegal in the UK at the time the ACMD report was issued. Two compounds were specifically excluded from the ban, these being bupropion because of its common use in medicine and relative lack of abuse potential, and naphyrone because its structure falls outside the generic definition and not enough evidence was yet available to justify a ban.

Naphyrone analogues were subsequently banned in July 2010 following a further review by the ACMD, along with a further broad based structure ban even more expansive than the last.

"Any compound structurally derived from 2–aminopropan–1–one by substitution at the 1-position with any monocyclic, or fused-polycyclic ring system (not being a phenyl ring or alkylenedioxyphenyl ring system), whether or not the compound is

further modified in any of the following ways, that is to say—

(i) by substitution in the ring system to any extent with alkyl, alkoxy, haloalkyl or halide substituents, whether or not further substituted in the ring system by one or more other univalent substituents;

(ii) by substitution at the 3–position with an alkyl substituent;

(iii) by substitution at the 2-amino nitrogen atom with alkyl or dialkyl groups, or

by inclusion of the 2-amino nitrogen atom in a cyclic structure".

— Home Office, 13 July 2010.

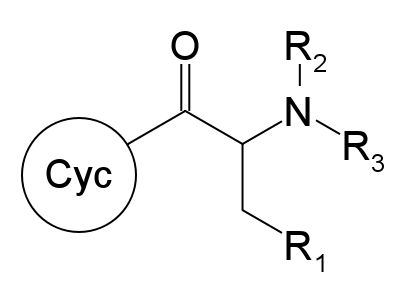
General chemical structure of substituted naphyrones, with R_{1}-R_{3} defined in text

The substitutions in the general structure for naphyrone analogues subject to the ban may be described as follows:

- Cyc = any monocyclic, or fused-polycyclic ring system (not being a phenyl ring or alkylenedioxyphenyl ring system), including analogues where the ring system is substituted to any extent with alkyl, alkoxy, haloalkyl or halide substituents, whether or not further substituted in the ring system by one or more other univalent substituents
- R_{1} = hydrogen or any alkyl group
- R_{2} = hydrogen, any alkyl group, or incorporation in a cyclic structure
- R_{3} = hydrogen, any alkyl group, or incorporation in a cyclic structure

More new derivatives have however continued to appear, with the UK reporting more novel cathinone derivatives detected in 2010 than any other country in Europe, with most of them first identified after the generic ban had gone into effect and thus already being illegal despite never having been previously reported.

In the United States, substituted cathinones are the psychoactive ingredients in "bath salts" which as of July 2011 were banned by at least 28 states, but not by the federal government.

== See also ==
- Markush structure
- Substituted amphetamines
- Substituted β-hydroxyamphetamines
- Substituted methylenedioxyphenethylamines
- Substituted phenethylamines
- Substituted phenylmorpholines
- Substituted β-ketotryptamines
- Structural scheduling of synthetic cannabinoids
- Arylcyclohexylamines
- List of aminorex analogues
- List of fentanyl analogues
- List of methylphenidate analogues
