= 4-Cl-3-MMC =

Chemical compound

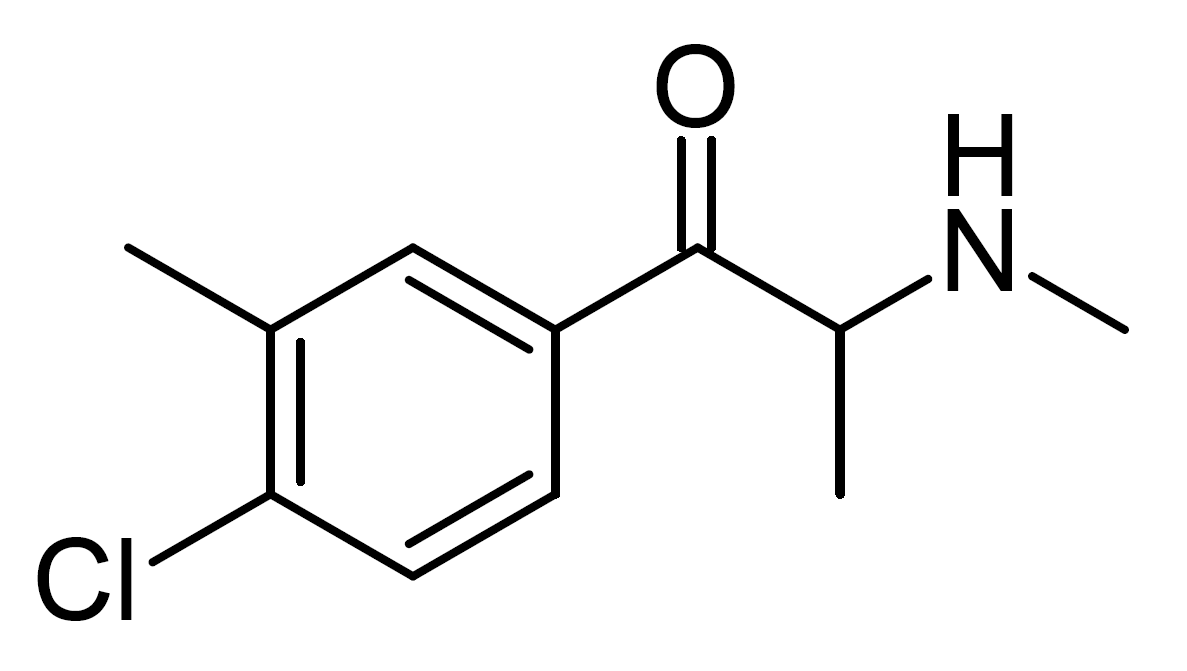

Legal status
- Legal status: DE: Anlage II (Authorized trade only, not prescriptible); UK: Class B

Identifiers
- IUPAC name: 1-(4-chloro-3-methylphenyl)-2-(methylamino)propan-1-one
- CAS Number: 15861-86-6
- PubChem CID: 112462091
- ChemSpider: 25630651
- UNII: A9A937ZD7V

Chemical and physical data
- Formula: C_{11}H_{14}ClNO
- Molar mass: 211.69 g·mol^{−1}
- 3D model (JSmol): Interactive image
- SMILES: CC1=C(C=CC(=C1)C(=O)C(C)NC)Cl
- InChI: InChI=1S/C11H14ClNO/c1-7-6-9(4-5-10(7)12)11(14)8(2)13-3/h4-6,8,13H,1-3H3; Key:URGPSLGDHKUXKS-UHFFFAOYSA-N

4-Chloro-3-methylmethcathinone (4-Cl-3-MMC) is a chemical compound from the substituted cathinone family. It has stimulant effects, and has been sold as a designer drug. It was first identified in Sweden in 2021. It is illegal in Italy and Finland, as well as under generic legislation in various other jurisdictions.

== See also ==
- 3-Methylmethcathinone
- 4-Chloromethcathinone
- MFPVP
