= 4-Fluoroethcathinone =

Stimulant designer drug

Legal status
- Legal status: CA: Schedule I; DE: NpSG (Industrial and scientific use only); UK: Class B

Identifiers
- IUPAC name: 2-(Ethylamino)-1-(4-fluorophenyl)propan-1-one
- CAS Number: 1225625-74-0
- PubChem CID: 82100444
- ChemSpider: 25630443
- UNII: ML7H977FPM
- CompTox Dashboard (EPA): DTXSID801336230

Chemical and physical data
- Formula: C_{11}H_{14}FNO
- Molar mass: 195.237 g·mol^{−1}
- 3D model (JSmol): Interactive image
- SMILES: CCNC(C)C(=O)C1=CC=C(C=C1)F
- InChI: InChI=1S/C11H14FNO/c1-3-13-8(2)11(14)9-4-6-10(12)7-5-9/h4-8,13H,3H2,1-2H3; Key:KBNVGQPMFGSPPT-UHFFFAOYSA-N

4-Fluoroethcathinone (also known as 4-FEC) is a stimulant of the cathinone class and structural analog of flephedrone (4-fluoromethcathinone) that has been sold as designer drug.
