= 3-Chloromethcathinone =

Stimulant designer drug

Clinical data
- Other names: 3-CMC; Clophedrone; Metaclephedrone; 3-Cl-Methcathinone; PAL-434; PAL434
- ATC code: None

Legal status
- Legal status: DE: Anlage II (Authorized trade only, not prescriptible); UK: Class B; Illegal in China and Sweden

Pharmacokinetic data
- Duration of action: 1–4 hours

Identifiers
- IUPAC name: 1-(3-Chlorophenyl)-2-(methylamino)-1-propanone
- CAS Number: 1049677-59-9 1607439-32-6 (HCl)
- PubChem CID: 50999285
- ChemSpider: 24958143
- UNII: I2GB1C4TM7
- ChEMBL: ChEMBL3305871
- CompTox Dashboard (EPA): DTXSID501014162

Chemical and physical data
- Formula: C_{10}H_{12}ClNO
- Molar mass: 197.66 g·mol^{−1}
- 3D model (JSmol): Interactive image
- SMILES: CC(NC)C(C1=CC=CC(Cl)=C1)=O
- InChI: InChI=1S/C10H12ClNO/c1-7(12-2)10(13)8-4-3-5-9(11)6-8/h3-7,12H,1-2H3; Key:VOEFELLSAAJCHJ-UHFFFAOYSA-N

3-Chloromethcathinone (3-CMC), also known as clophedrone or as PAL-434, is a synthetic substance belonging to the cathinone class of psychoactive compounds. It is very similar in structure to other methcathinone derivatives such as 3-MMC and 4-CMC. Unlike cathinone, which occurs naturally in the khat plant Catha edulis, 3-CMC is not found in nature and is solely produced through chemical synthesis.

First detected in 2014, 3-CMC gained attention for its stimulating effects that are described to be similar to the effects of mephedrone and, to a lesser extent, those of MDMA and cocaine. 3-CMC has been sold online as a designer drug mainly in European countries such as Germany, Poland, the Netherlands, and Sweden. It is a controlled substance in many countries.

== Use ==
=== Recreational ===
The perceived effects are said to resemble those of 3-MMC, users report reduced effects and a shorter duration in comparison. Effects include stimulation, euphoria, and increased confidence, libido, and sociability. It can be administered orally or through nasal insufflation. As with other stimulant drugs, rectal and intravenous administration is also possible.

The acute effects of 3-CMC last 1 to 4 hours, depending on the administration method. After effects, like difficulty sleeping, can last 3 to 12 hours longer.

=== Availability ===
3-CMC has been available in Europe since 2014. According to the European Monitoring Centre for Drugs and Drug Addiction (EMCDDA) it has been detected in 25 European countries with the majority of drug seizures in Poland and the largest quantities in the Netherlands. The amount of 3-CMC seized in Europe has increased yearly from 2014 to 2021 indicating an increase in production and availability. Large seizures of 3-CMC by customs are reported to originate from India.

== Adverse effects ==
There are limited amounts of research available on the effects of 3-CMC. The effects are likely comparable to those of other cathinones of which it is known exposure can result in symptoms such as tachycardia, hypertension, and episodes of psychosis. Users also report other side effects including an increase in body temperature, sweating, anxiety, and dry mouth.

== Toxicity ==
Information on the toxicity of 3-CMC is scarce, with only exploratory cytotoxicity studies conducted.

Main concerns regarding toxicity of this compound origin in analogies to chloro-amphetamines (para-chloroamphetamine) which have confirmed neurotoxic effects. B-keto substitution in Cathinones completely alters their metabolism in comparison with amphetamines, rendering such analogies pointless. Recent study investigating toxicity of various chlorinated cathinones on SH-SY5Y human neuroblastoma cells showed LC50 (lower value indicating higher toxicity) of 2.1 mM for 4-MMC, 2.3 mM for 3-CMC and 1 mM for bupropion in study referred to as 3-Cl-TBC. To put that into perspective, similar studies show LC50 for 4-CA sitting around 0.5mM.

Between November 2019 and June 2021, the EMCDDA reported ten deaths linked to 3-CMC exposure in Poland (7 cases) and Sweden (3 cases). Other substances were found in six cases, with alcohol being the only additional substance in two cases. Causes of death included multi-organ trauma caused by a traffic accident, toxic effects of 3-CMC, and intoxication with various substances. Details such as dosage and administration routes are lacking.

== Chemistry ==
The chemical name of 3-chloromethcathinone (3-CMC) is 1-(3-chlorophenyl)-2-(methylamino)-1-propanone. It is a N-alkylated and ring-substituted cathinone derivative. The drug is the analogue of bupropion in which its N-tert-butyl group has been replaced with an N-methyl group. Another related compound is 3-chlorocathinone (3-CC).

=== Isomers ===
3-CMC is a chloromethcathinone, which has two other positional isomers, namely 2-CMC and 4-CMC. These differ in the position of the chlorine atom on the phenyl ring. As well as 3-CMC, these molecules are both known designer drugs.

Since 3-CMC contains a chiral center, there are two enantiomers, namely (S)-3-CMC and (R)-3-CMC. The products are most likely on the market as a racemic mixture of the two enantiomers, since separation would result in very high costs.

=== Synthesis ===
3-CMC is commonly synthesized starting from 3-chloropropiophenone.

3-chloropropiophenone is subjected to alpha halogenation using bromine. Subsequently, methylamine acts as a nucleophile and displaces bromide in a nucleophilic substitution to form a racemic product. Cathinones are usually unstable as a freebase, so the product is often treated with HCl or HBr to form a hydrochloride or hydrobromide salt, respectively.

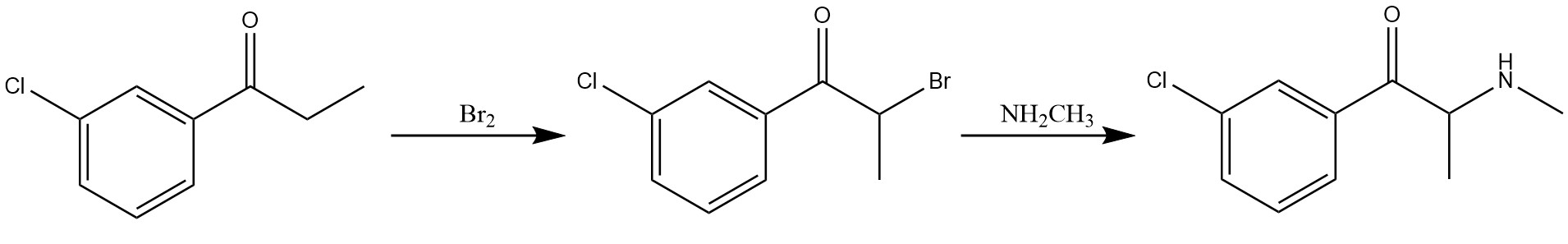
Synthesis of 3-chloromethcathinone reaction scheme

== Pharmacology ==
=== Pharmacodynamics ===
Transporter	EC_{50} [nM]	IC_{50} [nM]
SERT	211	1194
NET	19	290
DAT	26	342

The pharmacology of 3-CMC is expected to be very similar to the pharmacology for other mephedrone analogs (methcathinones). These molecules interact with monoamine transporters, in particular the dopamine transporter (DAT), norepinephrine transporter (NET), and serotonin transporter (SERT) . The main function of these transporters is to terminate monoamine transmission by reuptake of the released neurotransmitters. Interaction of psychoactive drugs with the monoamine transporters inhibits this reuptake leading to an increase in the concentration of dopamine, norepinephrine and serotonin in the synaptic cleft.

Specifically, 3-chloromethcathinone (3-CMC) and other ring-substituted methcathinone derivatives act as substrates for monoamine transporters MATs (and subsequently competitive inhibitors), through which they are actively translocated into the cytoplasm of the presynaptic nerve terminal. Once inside the cytosol, they interact with the vesicular monoamine transporter 2 (VMAT2) as substrates, disrupting the vesicular proton gradient and facilitating the collapse of synaptic vesicles. This causes the release of stored neurotransmitters into the cytoplasm. The resulting high concentration of cytosolic neurotransmitters subsequently triggers the reversal of MAT transport direction, leading to carrier-mediated efflux of the neurotransmitters into the synaptic cleft. Furthermore, simple ring-substituted cathinones contrast with traditional amphetamines by lacking significant affinity for the intracellular trace amine-associated receptor 1 (TAAR1). In traditional amphetamine pharmacology, TAAR1 activation triggers intracellular phosphorylation signaling cascades that facilitate and optimize the structural reversal of monoamine transporters (MATs) to allow efficient neurotransmitter efflux. Because cathinones fail to activate TAAR1, this phosphorylation is absent, rendering carrier-mediated efflux less efficient. Consequently, displaced neurotransmitters tend to accumulate and linger within the cytoplasm rather than being cleanly exported to the synaptic cleft, promoting intracellular auto-oxidation, and faster depletion.

Psychostimulants differ in their relative affinity for DAT, SERT and NET. In a study done on brain cells of male rats 3-CMC was found to interact on a relatively similar level with DAT and NET as mephedrone, while it interacts significantly less with SERT. Another study done on male rats also concludes that 3-CMC causes more release of dopamine in proportion to serotonin whereas mephedrone releases relatively more serotonin.

3-CMC produces hyperlocomotion, a psychostimulant-like effect, in rodents. It substitutes for cocaine in drug discrimination tests in monkeys. The drug is less potent in substituting for cocaine than methcathinone, which has been theorized to be due to its greater capacity to induce serotonin release and to thereby inhibit its own reinforcing effects.

=== Pharmacokinetics ===
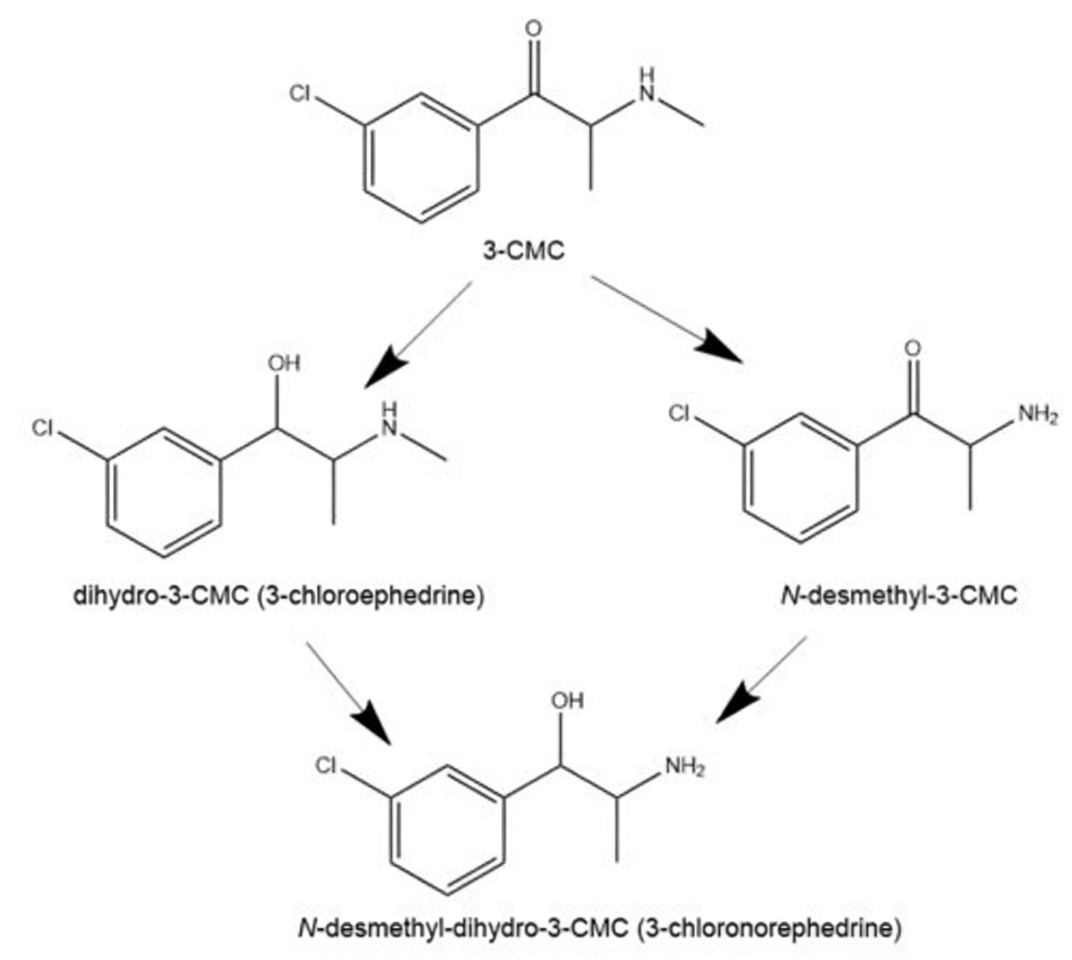

Cathinones are typically metabolized in the body through processes such as oxidation, reduction, hydrolysis, and conjugation reactions, primarily occurring in the liver. Consumed orally they undergo extensive first-pass metabolism responsible for significant reduction of activity when taken via this route.

Main metabolic pathways have been well established as of now consisting of N-demethylation, β-keto reduction and combination of these resulting in formation of 3-chloroephedrine (dihydro-3-CMC) and N-desmethyl-3-CMC the latter being further reduced to 3-chloronorephedrine (N-desmethyl-dihydro-3-CMC). The dihydro metabolites, being considerably more stable than the parent cathinone, are the most abundant in blood and urine samples. Direct studies on activity of 3-chloroephedrine and 3-chloronorephedrine are lacking.However, by structural and metabolic analogy to closely related compounds such as cathinone, methcathinone, and mephedrone, they are expected to retain modest sympathomimetic activity (primarily norepinephrine-mediated peripheral effects such as vasoconstriction, tachycardia, and mild stimulation) but to exhibit substantially diminished central dopaminergic effects (euphoria and reinforcement) compared with the parent drug. These reduced metabolites likely contribute to prolonged but attenuated cardiovascular or stimulant effects due to their greater stability and higher abundance in circulation.

== Legal status ==
As of March 2022, the European Commission has taken new measures to control the psychoactive substance of 3-CMC. This decision is based on a risk assessment conducted by the EU Drugs Agency (EMCDDA) in November 2021.

Since 3-CMC was prohibited in China (October 2015), it was found that most of the production was manufactured in India and little of the substance supply originates from inside Europe.

Several European countries were ahead of the European Commission report by (generically) controlling the substance. Nowadays, in almost all countries 3-CMC is prohibited.

== See also ==
- Substituted cathinone
- 3-Chloro-N-cyclopropylcathinone (3Cl-CpC; PAL-433, RTI-6037-39)
- 3-Fluoromethcathinone
- 3-Bromomethcathinone
- 3-Fluoromethamphetamine
- 3-Methylmethcathinone
- 3-Chloromethamphetamine
- 4-Chloromethcathinone
- 5-Cl-bk-MPA
