= 3-Bromomethcathinone =

Clinical data
- Other names: 3-BMC; 3-Br-MC; 3′-Bromo-2-(methylamino)propanophenone; 3-BMAP
- Routes of administration: Oral
- Drug class: Stimulant; Serotonin–norepinephrine–dopamine releasing agent (SNDRA)
- ATC code: None

Identifiers
- IUPAC name: 1-(3-bromophenyl)-2-(methylamino)propan-1-one
- CAS Number: 486459-02-3
- PubChem CID: 10354356
- ChemSpider: 8529808
- UNII: 789QE5VA57
- CompTox Dashboard (EPA): DTXSID40438606

Chemical and physical data
- Formula: C_{10}H_{12}BrNO
- Molar mass: 242.116 g·mol^{−1}
- 3D model (JSmol): Interactive image
- SMILES: CC(C(=O)C1=CC(=CC=C1)Br)NC
- InChI: InChI=1S/C10H12BrNO/c1-7(12-2)10(13)8-4-3-5-9(11)6-8/h3-7,12H,1-2H3; Key:PXLYROINIXKFAW-UHFFFAOYSA-N

3-Bromomethcathinone (3-BMC) is a stimulant designer drug and monoamine releasing agent of the cathinone family. It acts as a serotonin–norepinephrine–dopamine releasing agent (SNDRA), with EC_{50} values for induction of monoamine release of 136–137 nM for serotonin, 25 nM for norepinephrine, and 21–28 nM for dopamine in rat brain synaptosomes. The drug produces hyperlocomotion in rodents comparably to but with slightly lower potency than methcathinone. The chemical synthesis of 3-BMC has been described. 3-BMC was first described in the scientific literature by 2002. It emerged as a novel designer drug in Israel and Germany and elsewhere in 2009.

== See also ==
- Substituted cathinone
- 3-Fluoromethcathinone (3-FMC)
- 3-Chloromethcathinone (3-CMC; clophedrone)
- 3-Methylmethcathinone (3-MMC; metaphedrone)
- 4-Bromomethcathinone (4-BMC; brephedrone)
