= N-Ethylheptylone =

Substituted cathinone stimulant drug

Identifiers
- IUPAC name: 1-(1,3-Benzodioxol-5-yl)-2-(ethylamino)heptan-1-one
- CAS Number: 3017234-54-4
- PubChem CID: 163195976
- UNII: A8C8L7AA9N
- CompTox Dashboard (EPA): DTXSID401342263

Chemical and physical data
- Formula: C_{16}H_{23}NO_{3}
- Molar mass: 277.364 g·mol^{−1}
- 3D model (JSmol): Interactive image
- SMILES: CCCCCC(NCC)C(=O)c1ccc2OCOc2c1
- InChI: InChI=1S/C16H23NO3/c1-3-5-6-7-13(17-4-2)16(18)12-8-9-14-15(10-12)20-11-19-14/h8-10,13,17H,3-7,11H2,1-2H3; Key:ZYFSMTZZSZKLKU-UHFFFAOYSA-N

N-Ethylheptylone (HEP) is a recreational designer drug from the substituted cathinone family, with stimulant effects. It is a homologue of related drugs such as ethylone, eutylone, ephylone and N-ethylhexylone but with a longer pentyl side chain. It was first reported in Sweden in 2019.

== See also ==
- Substituted methylenedioxyphenethylamine
- α-PEP
- 3F-NEH
- 4F-PV9
- MDPHP
- MDPEP
- N-Ethylheptedrone
