= 5-Methylethylone =

Names
- Preferred IUPAC name 2-(Ethylamino)-1-(7-methyl-2H-1,3-benzodioxol-5-yl)ethan-1-one
- Other names R-MMC; 3,4-Methylenedioxy-5-methyl-N-ethyl cathinone; 5-Methyl-βk-MDEA

Identifiers
CAS Number	1364933-82-3
3D model (JSmol)	Interactive image
ChemSpider	29763704
PubChem CID	112500536
UNII	3U77H8TN7N
CompTox Dashboard (EPA)	DTXSID701031461
- InChI: InChI=1S/C13H17NO3/c1-4-14-9(3)12(15)10-5-8(2)13-11(6-10)16-7-17-13/h5-6,9,14H,4,7H2,1-3H3 Key: YCLKQJDSTUZDKJ-UHFFFAOYSA-N
- SMILES: CC1=CC(C(C(C)NCC)=O)=CC2=C1OCO2

Properties
Chemical formula	C_{13}H_{17}NO_{3}
Molar mass	235.283 g·mol^{−1}
- Except where otherwise noted, data are given for materials in their standard state (at 25 °C [77 °F], 100 kPa). Infobox references

5-Methylethylone (5-methyl-βk-MDEA, 5ME) is an empathogen, stimulant and psychedelic drug of the amphetamine, phenethylamine, and cathinone chemical classes. It is structurally related to ethylone, a novel designer drug. Relatively little data exists about the pharmacological properties, metabolism, and toxicity of 5-methylethylone, though it has been sold as a designer drug.

== Legal status ==
=== United States ===
5-Methylethylone is unscheduled in the United States, but it is not currently approved by the Food and Drug Administration for human consumption. The state of Vermont lists it as a regulated drug.

== See also ==
- Substituted methylenedioxyphenethylamine
- 5-Methyl-MDA
- Butylone
- Eutylone
- Ephylone
- Isohexylone
- Methylone
- N-Ethylhexylone
