= BOD-PVP =

Clinical data
- Other names: ODPVP

Identifiers
- IUPAC name: 1-(2,1,3-benzoxadiazol-5-yl)-2-(pyrrolidin-1-yl)pentan-1-one

Chemical and physical data
- Formula: C_{15}H_{19}N_{3}O_{2}
- Molar mass: 273.336 g·mol^{−1}
- 3D model (JSmol): Interactive image
- SMILES: O=C(C(CCC)N1CCCC1)c1ccc2nonc2c1
- InChI: InChI=1S/C15H19N3O2/c1-2-5-14(18-8-3-4-9-18)15(19)11-6-7-12-13(10-11)17-20-16-12/h6-7,10,14H,2-5,8-9H2,1H3; Key:KSOZJJFMYWEEFX-UHFFFAOYSA-N

BOD-PVP (ODPVP) is a recreational designer drug from the substituted cathinone family, with stimulant effects. It was first identified in Russia in May 2026. Its pharmacological activity has not been studied, but it is related in chemical structure to drugs such as MDPV and ODMA.

== See also ==
- Substituted cathinone
- Substituted α-propylphenethylamine
- Substituted pyrrolidinophenone
- IBF5MAP
- Naphyrone
