= 4-Bromomethcathinone =

Psychoactive drug and research chemical

Clinical data
- Other names: 4-BMC; Brephedrone

Legal status
- Legal status: BR: Class F2 (Prohibited psychotropics); DE: NpSG (Industrial and scientific use only); UK: Class B

Identifiers
- IUPAC name: 1-(4-bromophenyl)-2-(methylamino)propan-1-one
- CAS Number: 486459-03-4
- PubChem CID: 10421832
- ChemSpider: 8597261
- UNII: 9GU9FVS6HH
- CompTox Dashboard (EPA): DTXSID401014169

Chemical and physical data
- Formula: C_{10}H_{12}BrNO
- Molar mass: 242.116 g·mol^{−1}
- 3D model (JSmol): Interactive image
- Chirality: Racemic mixture
- SMILES: CC(C(=O)C1=CC=C(C=C1)Br)NC
- InChI: InChI=1S/C10H12BrNO/c1-7(12-2)10(13)8-3-5-9(11)6-4-8/h3-7,12H,1-2H3; Key:OOJXMFNDUXHDOV-UHFFFAOYSA-N

4-Bromomethcathinone (4-BMC, 4-BMAP), also known as brephedrone, is a psychoactive drug and research chemical of the phenethylamine, amphetamine, and cathinone chemical classes. It acts as a serotonin-norepinephrine-dopamine releasing agent (SNDRA), and to a lesser degree, as a serotonin-norepinephrine-dopamine reuptake inhibitor (SNDRI). Cathinones, including 4-BMC, possess neurotoxic and cytotoxic properties.

== Legal status ==
As of October 2015, 4-BMC is a controlled substance in China. 4-Bromomethcathinone is considered a Schedule 1 substance in Virginia.

== See also ==
- Substituted cathinone
- 4B-MAR
- 4-Chloromethcathinone
- 4-Ethylmethcathinone
- 3-Bromomethcathinone
- para-Bromomethamphetamine (PBMA)
