= 3-Chlorocathinone =

Clinical data
- Other names: 3-CC; Norclophedrone; 3Cl-C; 3Cl-Cathinone; 3-Chloro-β-ketoamphetamine
- Drug class: Stimulant; Serotonin–norepinephrine–dopamine releasing agent

Identifiers
- IUPAC name: 2-amino-1-(3-chlorophenyl)propan-1-one
- CAS Number: 119802-69-6
- PubChem CID: 22031823
- ChemSpider: 10769205
- UNII: WE6T7CGT56
- CompTox Dashboard (EPA): DTXSID80621813

Chemical and physical data
- Formula: C_{9}H_{10}ClNO
- Molar mass: 183.64 g·mol^{−1}
- 3D model (JSmol): Interactive image
- SMILES: CC(C(=O)C1=CC(=CC=C1)Cl)N
- InChI: InChI=1S/C9H10ClNO/c1-6(11)9(12)7-3-2-4-8(10)5-7/h2-6H,11H2,1H3; Key:RDWWHMAISJGIDU-UHFFFAOYSA-N

3-Chlorocathinone (3-CC) is a psychostimulant drug of the cathinone family. It is the analogue of the antidepressant and norepinephrine–dopamine reuptake inhibitor (NDRI) bupropion in which the N-tert-butyl group has been removed. The drug is also the analogue of the stimulant 3-chloromethcathinone (3-CMC; clophedrone) in which the N-methyl group has been removed.

3-CC is a potent serotonin–norepinephrine–dopamine releasing agent (SNDRA). Its EC_{50} values for induction of monoamine release are 64 nM for dopamine, 105 nM for norepinephrine, and 567 nM for serotonin in rat brain synaptosomes. Hence, 3-CC shows almost 10-fold preference for induction of dopamine release over serotonin release and around 1.5-fold preference for induction of dopamine release over norepinephrine release.

The drug was encountered as a novel designer and recreational drug by 2020.

== See also ==
- 3-Chloro-N-cyclopropylcathinone (3Cl-CpC; PAL-433, RTI-6037-39)
