= Eutylone =

Designer drug of the cathinone class

Clinical data
- ATC code: None

Legal status
- Legal status: BR: Class F2 (Prohibited psychotropics); CA: Schedule I; DE: Anlage II (Authorized trade only, not prescriptible); UK: Class B; US: Schedule I; UN: Psychotropic Schedule II

Identifiers
- IUPAC name: (±)-1-(1,3-benzodioxol-5-yl)-2-(ethylamino)butan-1-one
- CAS Number: 802855-66-9; HCl: 17764-18-0
- PubChem CID: 57360686
- ChemSpider: 26716427
- UNII: D6WQJ7NF96; HCl: 4FNX1J271X
- KEGG: C22708
- CompTox Dashboard (EPA): DTXSID401018397 DTXSID90724364, DTXSID401018397

Chemical and physical data
- Formula: C_{13}H_{17}NO_{3}
- Molar mass: 235.283 g·mol^{−1}
- 3D model (JSmol): Interactive image
- SMILES: CCC(C(=O)C1=CC2=C(C=C1)OCO2)NCC
- InChI: InChI=1S/C13H17NO3/c1-3-10(14-4-2)13(15)9-5-6-11-12(7-9)17-8-16-11/h5-7,10,14H,3-4,8H2,1-2H3; Key:YERSNXHEOIYEGX-UHFFFAOYSA-N

Eutylone (also known as β-keto-1,3-benzodioxolyl-N-ethylbutanamine, bk-EBDB, and N-ethylbutylone) is a stimulant and empathogenic drug of the phenethylamine, amphetamine, phenylisobutylamine, and cathinone families. It was developed in the 1960s and first reported to the EMCDDA in 2014. Eutylone is a designer drug which became widespread internationally in 2019–2020 following bans on the related compound ephylone. It is a synthetic cathinone. In 2021, eutylone was the most common cathinone identified by the Drug Enforcement Administration in the United States.

== Pharmacology ==
IC50 inhibition values at monoamine transporters (nM)
DAT	NET	SERT
120 ± 10	1280 ± 140	690 ± 50

== Legal status ==
Sweden's public health agency suggested classifying eutylone as a hazardous substance on September 25, 2019.

In the United States Eutylone is considered a schedule 1 controlled substance as a positional isomer of Pentylone.

== See also ==
- Substituted methylenedioxyphenethylamine
- 5-Methylethylone
- Butylone
- Ethyl-J
- Ethylone
- Ephylone
- N-Ethylhexedrone
- N-Ethylhexylone
- N-Ethylheptylone
