= N-Ethylhexylone =

Chemical compound

Identifiers
- IUPAC name: 1-(1,3-Benzodioxol-5-yl)-2-(ethylamino)hexan-1-one
- CAS Number: 802605-02-3 27912-41-0 (hydrochloride)
- PubChem CID: 137700399
- UNII: 4906KZK4YO
- CompTox Dashboard (EPA): DTXSID901342199

Chemical and physical data
- Formula: C_{15}H_{21}NO_{3}
- Molar mass: 263.337 g·mol^{−1}
- 3D model (JSmol): Interactive image
- SMILES: CCCCC(NCC)C(=O)c1ccc2OCOc2c1

N-Ethylhexylone is a recreational designer drug from the substituted cathinone family, with stimulant effects. It was first identified in Poland in August 2019. It is illegal in Taiwan since July 2020, where it had been sold mixed with plant material under the name 彩虹菸 ("Rainbow Tobacco" or "Rainbow Smoke").

== See also ==
- Substituted methylenedioxyphenethylamine
- 3F-NEH
- 4F-PHP
- 5-Methylethylone
- Ethylone
- Eutylone
- Ephylone
- Isohexylone
- MDPV
- MDPHP
- N-Ethylhexedrone
- N-Ethylheptylone
