= 3-Fluoromethcathinone =

Designer stimulant drug

Clinical data
- Other names: 3-FMC, 3- Fluoromethcathinone
- Routes of administration: Oral, intranasal, intravenous

Legal status
- Legal status: DE: Anlage II (Authorized trade only, not prescriptible); UK: Class B; US: Schedule I

Identifiers
- IUPAC name: 1-(3-Fluorophenyl)-2-(methylamino)propan-1-one
- CAS Number: 1049677-77-1
- PubChem CID: 53415330
- ChemSpider: 27523958
- UNII: 78P68L3B0H
- CompTox Dashboard (EPA): DTXSID201017048

Chemical and physical data
- Formula: C_{10}H_{12}FNO
- Molar mass: 181.210 g·mol^{−1}
- 3D model (JSmol): Interactive image
- SMILES: FC1=CC=CC(=C1)C(C(C)NC)=O
- InChI: InChI=1S/C10H12FNO/c1-7(12-2)10(13)8-4-3-5-9(11)6-8/h3-7,12H,1-2H3; Key:PQIBROLLUQSNQI-UHFFFAOYSA-N

3-Fluoromethcathinone (also known as 3-FMC) is a chemical compound of the phenethylamine, amphetamine, and cathinone classes that has been sold online as a designer drug. It is a structural isomer of flephedrone (4-fluoromethcathinone).

3-Fluoroisomethcathinone is produced as a by-product when 3-FMC is synthesized, the activity of this compound is unknown.

== Effects ==
This chemical's effects and safety have not been studied scientifically.

== Legal status ==
In the United States, 3-FMC is Schedule I controlled substance.

In the United Kingdom, 3-FMC is a controlled drug under the cathinone blanket ban.

3-FMC is an Anlage II controlled drug in Germany.

3-FMC is banned in the Czech Republic.

== See also ==
- Substituted cathinone
- 3,5-Difluoromethcathinone
- 3-Bromomethcathinone
- 3-Chloromethcathinone
- 3-Fluoroamphetamine
- 3-Fluoroethamphetamine
- 3-Fluoromethamphetamine
