= Pentedrone =

Stimulant designer drug of the cathinone class

Clinical data
- Other names: α-Methylaminovalerophenone; α-Propyl-β-keto-N-methylphenethylamine; α-Desmethyl-α-propyl-N-methylcathinone; α-Desmethyl-α-propylmethcathinone; α-Desmethyl-α-propyl-β-keto-N-methylamphetamine; α-Desmethyl-α-propyl-β-ketomethamphetamine
- ATC code: none

Legal status
- Legal status: BR: Class F2 (Prohibited psychotropics); DE: Anlage II (Authorized trade only, not prescriptible); UK: Class B; US: Schedule I; UN: Psychotropic Schedule II

Identifiers
- IUPAC name: (±)-1-phenyl-2-(methylamino)pentan-1-one
- CAS Number: 879722-57-3
- PubChem CID: 71750191
- ChemSpider: 26286729
- UNII: 2ELU1B757Q
- KEGG: C22784
- CompTox Dashboard (EPA): DTXSID101014184
- ECHA InfoCard: 100.231.338

Chemical and physical data
- Formula: C_{12}H_{17}NO
- Molar mass: 191.274 g·mol^{−1}
- 3D model (JSmol): Interactive image
- SMILES: O=C(C(CCC)NC)C1=CC=CC=C1
- InChI: InChI=1S/C12H17NO/c1-3-7-11(13-2)12(14)10-8-5-4-6-9-10/h4-6,8-9,11,13H,3,7H2,1-2H3; Key:WLIWIUNEJRETFX-UHFFFAOYSA-N

Pentedrone (also known as α-methylaminovalerophenone) is a stimulant of the cathinone class that has been sold as a designer drug and has been found since 2010 as an ingredient in a number of "bath salt" mixes sold as legal highs.

== Pharmacology ==
Pentedrone acts as a norepinephrine-dopamine reuptake inhibitor (NDRI) without inducing monoamine release, a similar mechanism of action to methylphenidate. Its IC_{50} values for inhibition of monoamine reuptake have been reported to be 610 nM for norepinephrine, 2,500 μM for dopamine, and 135,000 μM for serotonin. In rodents, pentedrone has been found to produce conditioned place preference (CPP), to be self-administered, and to dose-dependently stimulate locomotor activity. Hence, pentedrone shows psychostimulant-like and reinforcing effects in animals.

== Side effects ==
Pentedrone has been linked to at least one death where it was combined with α-PVP and caused heart failure.

== Detection ==
A forensic standard of pentedrone is available, and the compound has been posted on the Forendex website of potential drugs of abuse.

== Legal status ==
On January 28, 2014, the DEA listed it, along with nine other synthetic cathinones, on the Schedule 1 with a temporary ban, effective February 27, 2014.

Pentedrone is an Anlage II controlled drug in Germany.

As of October 2015 Pentedrone is a controlled substance in China.

Pentedrone is banned in the Czech Republic.

Pentedrone is banned in the Slovak Republic.

== See also ==
- 4-Methylpentedrone
- Buphedrone
- MDPV
- Methcathinone
- Pentylone
- Phenylpropylaminopentane
- Substituted cathinone
