= 4-Chloromethcathinone =

Simulant drug of the cathinone class

Legal status
- Legal status: BR: Class F2 (Prohibited psychotropics); DE: Anlage I (Authorized scientific use only); UK: Class B; UN: Psychotropic Schedule II; Illegal in China and Sweden

Identifiers
- IUPAC name: 1-(4-chlorophenyl)-2-(methylamino)-1-propanone
- CAS Number: 1225843-86-6
- PubChem CID: 82100418
- ChemSpider: 25630416
- UNII: PTAYYYZMMT
- KEGG: C22721
- CompTox Dashboard (EPA): DTXSID201014163
- ECHA InfoCard: 100.257.446

Chemical and physical data
- Formula: C_{10}H_{12}ClNO
- Molar mass: 197.66 g·mol^{−1}
- 3D model (JSmol): Interactive image
- Melting point: 198 °C (388 °F)
- SMILES: ClC1=CC=C(C(C(C)NC)=O)C=C1
- InChI: InChI=1S/C10H12ClNO/c1-7(12-2)10(13)8-3-5-9(11)6-4-8/h3-7,12H,1-2H3; Key:UEJBEYOXRNGPEI-UHFFFAOYSA-N

4-Chloromethcathinone (also known as 4-CMC and clephedrone) is a stimulant drug of the cathinone class that has been sold online as a designer drug.

4-CMC produces similar effects to mephedrone, and has been sold as an alternative in countries where mephedrone was scheduled.

== Adverse effects ==
=== Short-term ===
4-CMC produces similar side effects to mephedrone, including: increased blood pressure, tachycardia, hyperthermia, and anxiety.

=== Neurotoxicity ===
Its chemical structure closely resembles para-chloromethamphetamine, raising concerns about its potential to readily induce cell death of serotonergic neurons. However, no neurotoxicity of this kind has been found to occur, but studies involving mice do indicate that it is neurotoxic through other mechanisms, similarly to other cathinones. 4-CMC is cytotoxic and induces oxidative stress, more so than 4-MMC. Moreover, β-keto substitution is thought to change cathinone structure activity relationships (SAR) and metabolism compared to amphetamines, leading to differences in pharmacology.

== Pharmacology ==
=== Pharmacodynamics ===
4-CMC mainly acts as a serotonin–norepinephrine–dopamine releasing agent (SNDRA), and partially as a serotonin-norepinephrine-dopamine reuptake inhibitor (SNDRI), with similar potency to mephedrone

Effects of 4-CMC and mephedrone on neurotransmitter release
Drug	Release at DAT EC_{50} (nM)	Release at NET EC_{50} (nM)	Release at SERT EC_{50} (nM)
Mephedrone (4-MMC)	103 ± 16	83 ± 20	188 ± 22
4-CMC	91 ± 11	99 ± 18	169 ± 20

Effects of 4-CMC and mephedrone on inhibition of neurotransmitter uptake
Drug	Uptake Inhibition at DAT IC_{50} (nM)	Uptake Inhibition at NET IC_{50} (nM)	Uptake Inhibition at SERT IC_{50} (nM)
Mephedrone (4-MMC)	769 ± 106	319 ± 40	600 ± 99
4-CMC	1014 ± 78	559 ± 57	542 ± 38

== Legality ==
4-CMC is an Anlage I controlled drug in Germany.

Sweden's public health agency suggested classifying 4-Chloromethcathinone (klefedron) as illegal narcotic on June 1, 2015.

As of October 2015, 4-CMC is a controlled substance in China.

4-CMC is considered a Schedule 1 substance in Virginia.

4-CMC is illegal in Poland (group II-P psychotropic substance)

In December 2019, the UNODC announced scheduling recommendations placing 4-CMC into Schedule II.

== See also ==
- 3-Chloromethcathinone
- 3-Methylmethcathinone
- 4-Bromomethcathinone
- 4-Chloroamphetamine
- 4-Cl-3-MMC
- 4Cl-PVP
- 4-Ethylmethcathinone
- 4-Methylmethcathinone
- Substituted cathinone
