= Flephedrone =

Stimulant designer drug

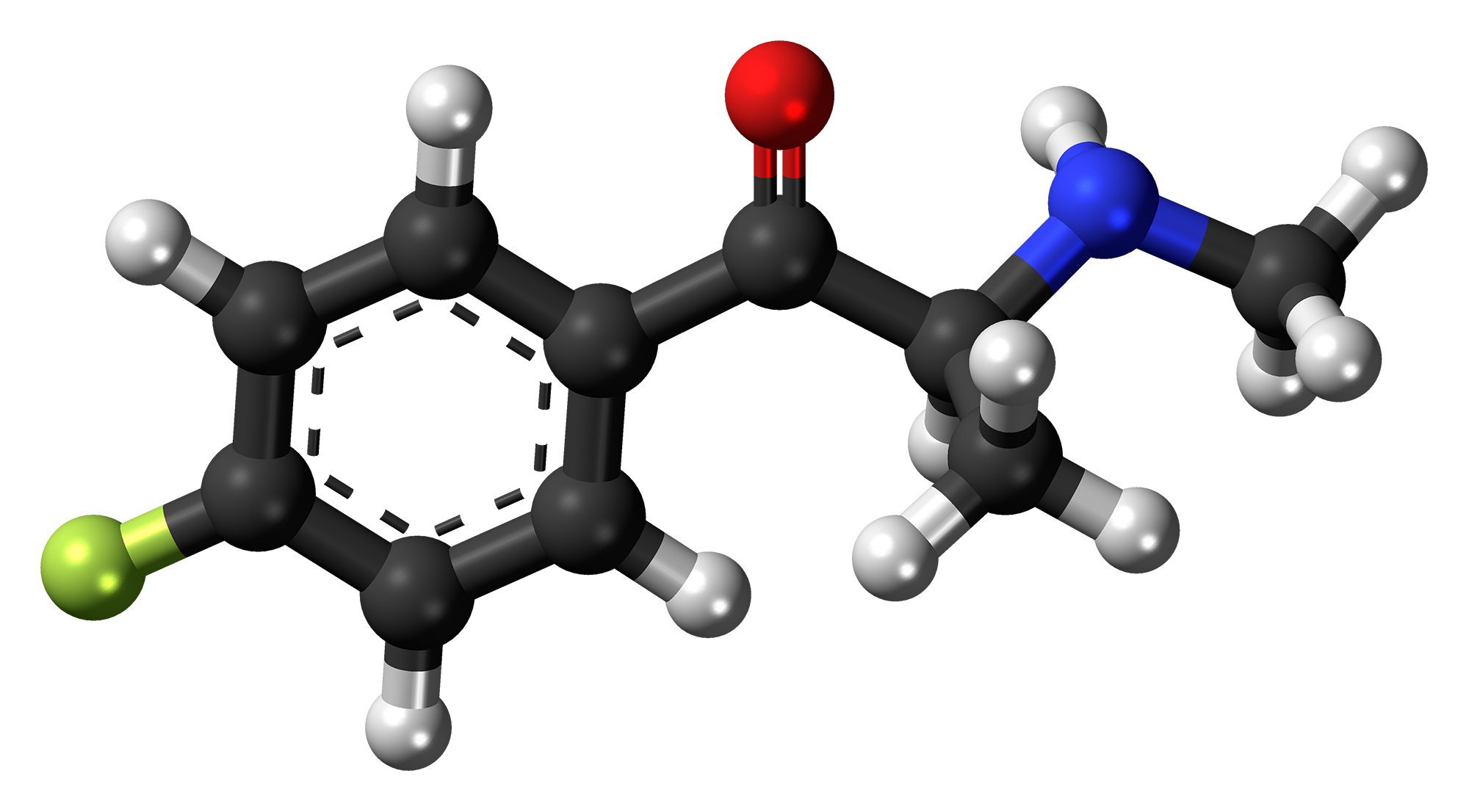

Clinical data
- Other names: 4-Fluoromethcathinone; 4-FMC
- Routes of administration: Oral, insufflation, vaporized

Legal status
- Legal status: BR: Class F2 (Prohibited psychotropics); DE: Anlage II (Authorized trade only, not prescriptible); UK: Class B; US: Schedule I; Illegal in Denmark, Poland

Identifiers
- IUPAC name: 1-(4-Fluorophenyl)-2-(methylamino)propan-1-one
- CAS Number: 447-40-5
- PubChem CID: 49853406
- ChemSpider: 21477355
- UNII: BA88IEZ2HF
- CompTox Dashboard (EPA): DTXSID401028417

Chemical and physical data
- Formula: C_{10}H_{12}FNO
- Molar mass: 181.210 g·mol^{−1}
- 3D model (JSmol): Interactive image
- Chirality: Racemic mixture
- SMILES: CNC(C)C(=O)c(cc1)ccc1F
- InChI: InChI=1S/C10H12FNO/c1-7(12-2)10(13)8-3-5-9(11)6-4-8/h3-7,12H,1-2H3; Key:MWKQPIROPJSFRI-UHFFFAOYSA-N

Flephedrone, also known as 4-fluoromethcathinone (4-FMC), is a stimulant drug of the cathinone chemical class that has been sold online as a designer drug starting in 2008.

== Toxicity ==
Flephedrone has only a short history of human use and its toxicity is not well established.

== Legality ==
Flephedrone has been illegal in Denmark since December 2008.

Flephedrone has been illegal in the UK since April 2010. Flephedrone has been illegal in the Lithuania since April 2010. Flephedrone is illegal in Brazil since 2017 as an analogue or derivative of cathinone. Flephedrone is most likely illegal in Australia as an analogue or derivative of cathinone.

Flephedrone has been illegal in Poland since April 2010.

Flephedrone has been classed as a narcotic in Sweden since October 2010.

In the United States, flephedrone is temporarily listed as a Schedule I controlled substance. It is permanently listed as a Schedule I controlled substance in Florida, Georgia, and Pennsylvania.

As of October 2015 4-FMC is a controlled substance in China.

4-FMC is scheduled in the "government decree on psychoactive substances banned from the consumer market" in Finland.

== See also ==
- 3-Fluoromethcathinone (3-FMC)
