= 4-Methylethcathinone =

Stimulant designer drug

Clinical data
- Other names: 4-Methyl-N-ethylcathinone; 2-Ethylamino-1-p-tolylpropan-1-one

Legal status
- Legal status: BR: Class F2 (Prohibited psychotropics); DE: Anlage II (Authorized trade only, not prescriptible); NZ: Class C; UK: Class B; US: Schedule I; I-P (Poland)

Identifiers
- IUPAC name: (R/S)-2-Ethylamino-1-(4-methylphenyl)propan-1-one
- CAS Number: 1225617-18-4 1266688-86-1 (hydrochloride)
- PubChem CID: 52988258
- ChemSpider: 25630091
- UNII: 9665W17SH3
- KEGG: C22707
- CompTox Dashboard (EPA): DTXSID001016901

Chemical and physical data
- Formula: C_{12}H_{17}NO
- Molar mass: 191.274 g·mol^{−1}
- 3D model (JSmol): Interactive image
- SMILES: Cc1ccc(cc1)C(=O)C(C)NCC
- InChI: InChI=1S/C12H17NO/c1-4-13-10(3)12(14)11-7-5-9(2)6-8-11/h5-8,10,13H,4H2,1-3H3; Key:ZOXZWYWOECCBSH-UHFFFAOYSA-N

4-Methylethcathinone or 4-MEC is a chemical that bears a chemical resemblance to mephedrone. Due to its similarity to mephedrone, it is thought to be a stimulant and entactogen drug of the phenethylamine, amphetamine, and cathinone chemical classes. It has been marketed alone or in mixtures with other substituted cathinones under the name "NRG-2", although other blends such as "NRG-1" may have been more ambiguous with their ingredients.

4-MEC is reported to have been used as the active ingredient in fake "Ecstasy" pills in some countries such as New Zealand.

== Recreational use ==
Some users have injected the drug intravenously. It requires heating the water/4-MEC solution in order for 4-MEC to dissolve. Injecting 4-MEC appears to be rough on veins and is sometimes accompanied by a burning sensation. Therefore, 4-MEC should be diluted as much as possible. Intravenous dosages are comparable to oral ones, although more care should be given to safety (with regard to possibility of overdose and long-term effects).

== Legality ==
In the United States 4-MEC is a schedule 1 controlled substance.

== See also ==
- 4-Ethylmethcathinone
- 4-Methylbuphedrone
- 4-Methylcathinone
- 4-Methylpentedrone
- Substituted cathinone
- Benzedrone
- Mephedrone
