= Ethylone =

Chemical compound

Clinical data
- Other names: 3,4-Methylenedioxy-N-ethylcathinone; MDEC; βk-MDEA
- Pregnancy category: N (US)
- Routes of administration: Oral
- Drug class: Serotonin–norepinephrine–dopamine releasing agent; Entactogen
- ATC code: None

Legal status
- Legal status: BR: Class F2 (Prohibited psychotropics); DE: Anlage I (Authorized scientific use only); UK: Class B; UN: Psychotropic Schedule II

Pharmacokinetic data
- Duration of action: 2–4 hours

Identifiers
- IUPAC name: (RS)-1-(1,3-benzodioxol-5-yl)-2-(ethylamino)propan-1-one
- CAS Number: 1112937-64-0
- PubChem CID: 57252245
- ChemSpider: 21106271
- UNII: L91C78FW96
- KEGG: C22709
- CompTox Dashboard (EPA): DTXSID20894842

Chemical and physical data
- Formula: C_{12}H_{15}NO_{3}
- Molar mass: 221.256 g·mol^{−1}
- 3D model (JSmol): Interactive image
- Chirality: Racemic mixture
- SMILES: CC(NCC)C(=O)c1ccc2OCOc2c1
- InChI: InChI=1S/C12H15NO3/c1-3-13-8(2)12(14)9-4-5-10-11(6-9)16-7-15-10/h4-6,8,13H,3,7H2,1-2H3; Key:MJEMIOXXNCZZFK-UHFFFAOYSA-N

Ethylone, also known as 3,4-methylenedioxy-N-ethylcathinone (MDEC, βk-MDEA), is a recreational designer drug of the phenethylamine, amphetamine, and cathinone chemical classes. It is the β-keto analogue of MDEA ("Eve"). Ethylone has only a short history of human use and is reported to be less potent than its relative methylone. In the United States, it began to be found in cathinone products in late 2011.

Very little data exists about the pharmacological properties, metabolism, and toxicity of ethylone, and although several ethylone-related deaths have been reported, the cause of death was not due to ingestion of ethylone.

== Pharmacology ==
=== Pharmacodynamics ===
It inhibits the reuptake of serotonin, and to a lesser extent, that of norepinephrine and dopamine. Also is releaser of serotonin.

Parameter	DAT [nM]	SERT [nM]	NET [nM]
IC_{50} – reuptake inhibition	1720 ± 450	464 ± 75	1420 ± 200
EC_{50} – neurotransmitter release	>10 000	1480 ± 250	>10 000

=== Pharmacokinetics ===
Analysis of human and rat urine for the metabolites of bk-amphetamines suggested that ethylone was degraded in the following metabolic steps:

1. N-deethylation to the primary amine.
2. Reduction of the keto moiety to the respective alcohol.

== Society and culture ==
=== Legal status ===
As of October 2015, Ethylone is a controlled substance in China.

== See also ==
- Substituted methylenedioxyphenethylamine
- Substituted cathinone
- 5-Methylethylone
- Benzylone
