= N-Ethylpentylone =

Substituted cathinone stimulant drug

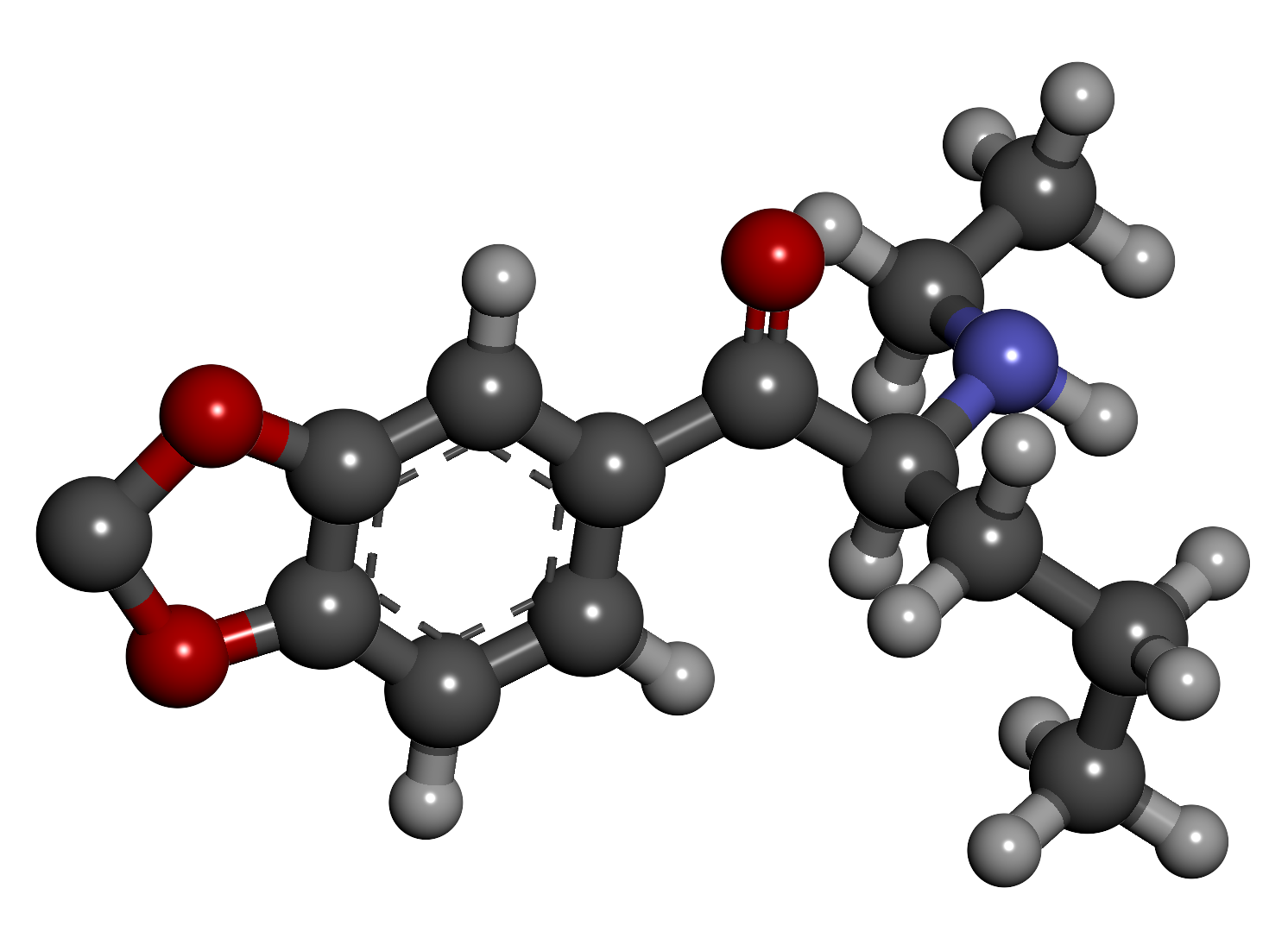

Clinical data
- ATC code: none

Legal status
- Legal status: BR: Class F2 (Prohibited psychotropics); CA: Schedule I; DE: Anlage II (Authorized trade only, not prescriptible); UK: Class B; US: Schedule I; UN: Psychotropic Schedule II

Identifiers
- IUPAC name: 1-(1,3-Benzodioxol-5-yl)-2-(ethylamino)pentan-1-one
- CAS Number: 727641-67-0; HCl: 17763-02-9
- PubChem CID: 57359308
- ChemSpider: 26949655
- UNII: D3H9D57JV9; HCl: S3G8XZW25I
- KEGG: C22710
- CompTox Dashboard (EPA): DTXSID701336299

Chemical and physical data
- Formula: C_{14}H_{19}NO_{3}
- Molar mass: 249.310 g·mol^{−1}
- 3D model (JSmol): Interactive image
- SMILES: CCNC(CCC)C(=O)c2ccc1OCOc1c2
- InChI: InChI=1S/C14H19NO3/c1-3-5-11(15-4-2)14(16)10-6-7-12-13(8-10)18-9-17-12/h6-8,11,15H,3-5,9H2,1-2H3; Key:VERDHJIMZYXGIW-UHFFFAOYSA-N

N-Ethylpentylone (β-keto-ethylbenzodioxolylpentanamine, βk-ethyl-K, βk-EBDP, ephylone) is a substituted cathinone and stimulant drug which was developed in the 1960s.

It has been reported as a novel designer drug in several countries including the United Kingdom, South Africa, New Zealand, the United States, and Australia. In 2018, N-ethylpentylone was the most common drug of the cathinone class to be identified in Drug Enforcement Administration seizures.

== Adverse effects ==
N-Ethylpentylone has been reported to cause lethal heart palpitations and hallucinations. It has been linked to a number of overdose deaths and hospitalisations, and has increasingly been mis-sold as MDMA.

== Pharmacology ==
N-Ethylpentylone is primarily a mixed norepinephrine reuptake inhibitor and dopamine reuptake inhibitor. It binds to transporters with IC_{50} values of 37 nM (dopamine transporter), 105 nM (norepinephrine transporter) and 383 nM (serotonin transporter). The methylenedioxy ring-substitution provides a higher potency at inhibiting serotonin reuptake than its analogue N-ethylpentedrone. N-Ethylpentylone is also a low-potency serotonin 5-HT_{2A} receptor agonist, with an EC_{50} of 5,200 nM.

In vivo studies in mice demonstrated that acute intraperitoneal administration of N-ethylpentylone induced an increase in locomotor activity, anxiolytic effects but also an aggressive behaviour as well as social exploration deficits. Repeated exposure to N-ethylpentylone induced hyperthermia, anorexia and rewarding effects. During withdrawal after repeated administration, depression-like symptoms, hyperlocomotion, and a decrease of social exploration were observed.

== Society and culture ==
=== Legal status ===
- In the United States, N-ethylpentylone is a Schedule I controlled substance since June 2018.
- In Taiwan, N-ethylpentylone is a controlled substance under Taiwan's Controlled Drugs Act since Dec 2017.
- In the Netherlands it has been added to the Opium Law on July 1 2025.

== See also ==
- Substituted methylenedioxyphenethylamine
- 5-Methylethylone
- Dipentylone
- Ethyl-K
- Eutylone
- Methylenedioxypyrovalerone (MDPV)
- N-Ethylhexedrone
- N-Ethylhexylone
- N-Ethylheptylone
- Pentylone
- Isohexylone
