= Butylone =

Psychoactive drug

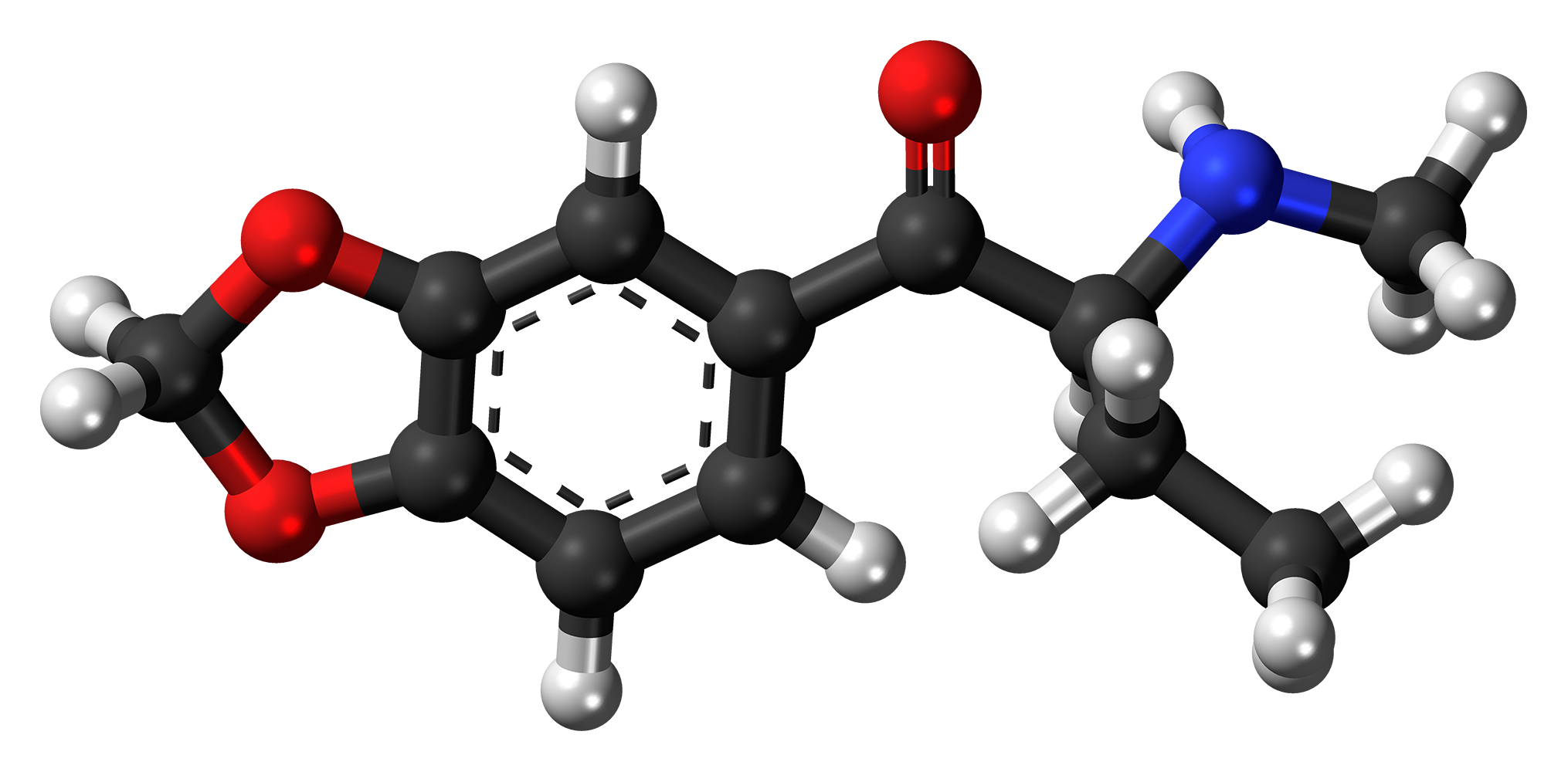

Clinical data
- Other names: β-Keto-N-methylbenzodioxolylbutanamine; βk-MBDB; 3,4-Methylenedioxy-N-methyl-α-ethyl-β-ketophenethylamine
- Routes of administration: Oral
- Drug class: Serotonin releasing agent; Norepinephrine–dopamine reuptake inhibitor; Entactogen
- ATC code: None

Legal status
- Legal status: DE: Anlage II (Authorized trade only, not prescriptible); UK: Class B; US: Schedule I; Illegal in Poland, Norway, Japan, Israel, Finland

Pharmacokinetic data
- Duration of action: 2–5 hours

Identifiers
- IUPAC name: 1-(1,3-benzodioxol-5-yl)-2-(methylamino)butan-1-one
- CAS Number: 802575-11-7
- PubChem CID: 56843046
- ChemSpider: 21073070
- UNII: X72T4EQ4FQ
- CompTox Dashboard (EPA): DTXSID001024651

Chemical and physical data
- Formula: C_{12}H_{15}NO_{3}
- Molar mass: 221.256 g·mol^{−1}
- 3D model (JSmol): Interactive image
- SMILES: CCC(C(=O)C1=CC2=C(C=C1)OCO2)NC
- InChI: InChI=1S/C12H15NO3/c1-3-9(13-2)12(14)8-4-5-10-11(6-8)16-7-15-10/h4-6,9,13H,3,7H2,1-2H3; Key:CGKQZIULZRXRRJ-UHFFFAOYSA-N

Butylone, also known as β-keto-N-methylbenzodioxolylbutanamine (βk-MBDB), is a psychoactive drug of the phenethylamine, amphetamine, phenylisobutylamine, and cathinone families. It is the β-keto (substituted cathinone) analogue of MBDB and the substituted methylenedioxyphenethylamine analogue of buphedrone.

== Pharmacology ==
=== Pharmacodynamics ===
Butylone acts in a similar way as MDMA and methylone, it causes an increase in extracellular monoamine levels.

The following tables lists the half maximal inhibitory and half maximal effective concentrations for norepinephrine, dopamine and serotonin receptors, respectively.

Monoamine transport inhibition, IC_{50} (μM)
NET	2.02 (1.5–2.7)
DAT	2.90 (2.5–3.4)
SERT	6.22 (4.3–9.0)

Monoamine release, EC_{50} (μM)
DAT	>100
SERT	5.5 (1.8–17)

=== Pharmacokinetics ===
==== Metabolism ====
There are three major metabolic pathways of bk-MBDB as shown in the figure. As result of demethylenation followed by O-methylation bk-MBDB metabolises into 4-OH-3-MeO and 3-OH-4-MeO metabolites in human urine. The second pathway is a β-ketone reduction into β-ketone reduced metabolites. The third pathway is a N-dealkylation into N-dealkyl metabolites. The first two pathways occur more than pathway three. The most common metabolite is the 4-OH-3-MeO metabolite. The metabolites containing a hydroxyl-group would be excreted as their conjugates in urine.

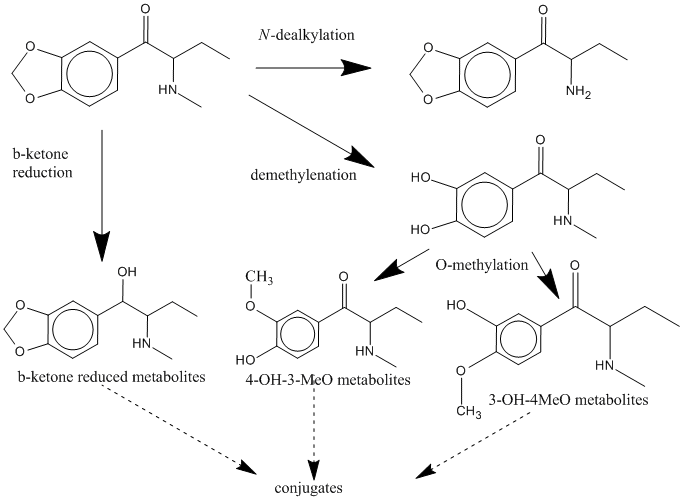
The three metabolic pathways of butylone.

== Chemistry ==
=== Synthesis ===
Butylone can be synthesized via the following route: 3,4-methylenedioxybutyrophenone dissolved in dichloromethane to bromine gives 3′,4′-methylenedioxy-2-bromobutyrophenone. This product was then dissolved in dichloromethane and added to an aqueous solution of methylamine (40%). HCl was then added. The aqueous layer was removed and made alkaline by using sodium bicarbonate. For the extraction of the amine ether was used. To get butylone a drop of ether and HCl solution was added.

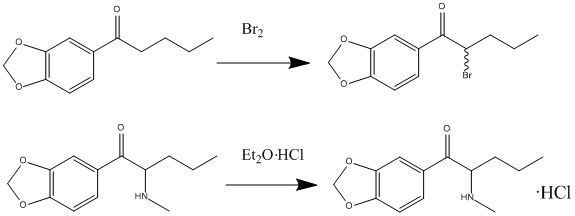
A brief reaction mechanism for pentylone, a homologue of butylone.

== History ==
Butylone was first synthesized by Koeppe, Ludwig and Zeile which is mentioned in their 1967 paper. It remained an obscure product of academia until 2005 when it was sold as a designer drug. Butylone shares the same relationship to methylone as MBDB does to MDMA ("Ecstasy"). Formal research on this chemical was first conducted in 2009, when it was shown to be metabolised in a similar manner to related drugs like methylone.

== Society and culture ==
=== Legal status ===
==== China ====
As of October 2015 Butylone is a controlled substance in China.

==== Finland ====
Scheduled in the "government decree on psychoactive substances banned from the consumer market".

==== Sweden ====
Sveriges riksdag added butylone to schedule I ("substances, plant materials and fungi which normally do not have medical use") as narcotics in Sweden as of Feb 1, 2010, published by Medical Products Agency in their regulation LVFS 2022:48 listed as Butylon, 1-(1,3-bensodioxol-5-yl)-2-(metylamino)butan-1-on.

==== United States ====
Butylone is also a Schedule I controlled substance under the Controlled Substances Act in the United States.

== See also ==
- Substituted methylenedioxyphenethylamine
- Substituted cathinone
- MDPBP
- Pentylone
- Ephylone
