= Para-Iodomethamphetamine =

para-Iodomethamphetamine

Clinical data
- Other names: PIMA; 4-Iodo-N-methylamphetamine; 4-IMA; D-9
- ATC code: None

Identifiers
- IUPAC name: 1-(4-iodophenyl)-N-methylpropan-2-amine
- CAS Number: 4302-90-3
- PubChem CID: 107259
- ChemSpider: 96528
- CompTox Dashboard (EPA): DTXSID60962852

Chemical and physical data
- Formula: C_{10}H_{14}IN
- Molar mass: 275.133 g·mol^{−1}
- 3D model (JSmol): Interactive image
- SMILES: CC(CC1=CC=C(C=C1)I)NC
- InChI: InChI=1S/C10H14IN/c1-8(12-2)7-9-3-5-10(11)6-4-9/h3-6,8,12H,7H2,1-2H3; Key:MXJYUKFIZBQAJV-UHFFFAOYSA-N

para-Iodomethamphetamine (PIMA), also known as 4-iodo-N-methylamphetamine (4-IMA) or as D-9, is a monoaminergic drug of the amphetamine family related to para-chloroamphetamine (PCA). It is the N-methyl analogue of para-iodoamphetamine (PIA). The drug is active in producing behavioral effects in animals, including hallucinogen-like effects. However, it is unclear whether these effects actually represent hallucinogenic reactions. PIMA does not appear to have been assessed, but other para-halogenated amphetamines, such as PCA, are known to act as monoamine releasing agents and as monoaminergic neurotoxins. They have not proved to be psychedelic in humans. PIMA was studied by Joseph Knoll and colleagues in the 1960s or 1970s.

== See also ==
- Substituted amphetamine
- para-Iodoamphetamine
- para-Bromoamphetamine
- para-Bromomethamphetamine
- para-Chloroamphetamine
- para-Chloromethamphetamine
- para-Fluoroamphetamine
- para-Fluoromethamphetamine
- N-Methyl-DOI
