= C9H12ClN =

The molecular formula C_{9}H_{12}ClN may refer to:

- 2-Chloroamphetamine
- 3-Chloroamphetamine
- 4-Chloroamphetamine
- β-Methyl-4-chlorophenethylamine
