= Fluoromethamphetamine =

Fluoromethamphetamine may refer to:

- 2-Fluoromethamphetamine (2-FMA)
- 3-Fluoromethamphetamine (3-FMA)
- 4-Fluoromethamphetamine (4-FMA)
