= C9H12FN =

The molecular formula C_{9}H_{12}FN (molar mass: 153.197 g/mol) may refer to:

- 2-Fluoroamphetamine (2-FA)
- 3-Fluoroamphetamine (3-FA)
- 4-Fluoroamphetamine (PFA)
