= C10H14FN =

The molecular formula C_{10}H_{14}FN may refer to:

- 2-Fluoromethamphetamine (2-FMA)
- 3-Fluoromethamphetamine (3-FMA)
- 4-Fluoromethamphetamine (4-FMA)
- 1-Fluoro(18F)-1-deoxyephedrine ([^{18}F]FDE, FDE)
