= 3,5-Difluoromethcathinone =

Chemical compound

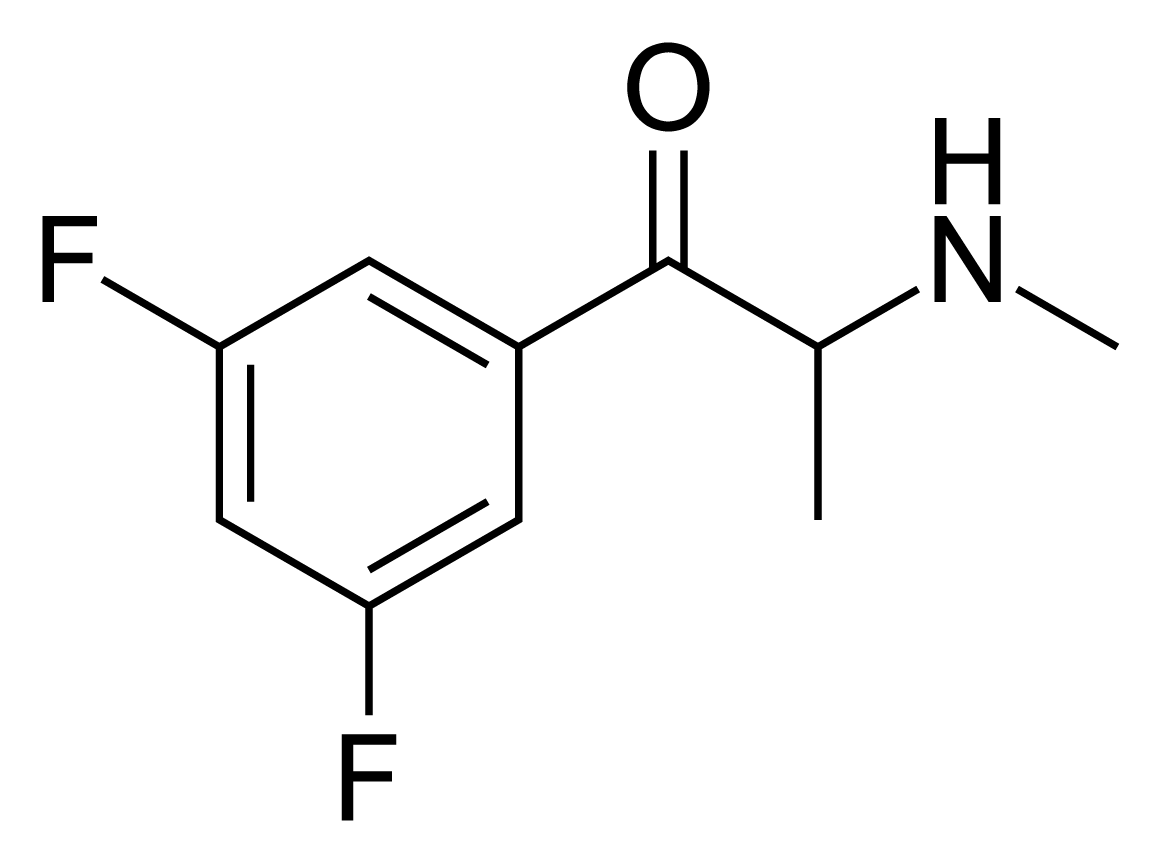

Clinical data
- Other names: 3-DFMC, 3,5-Difluoromethcathinone

Legal status
- Legal status: DE: Anlage II (Authorized trade only, not prescriptible); UK: Class B

Identifiers
- IUPAC name: 1-(3,5-difluorophenyl)-2-(methylamino)propan-1-one
- CAS Number: 1430343-55-7
- PubChem CID: 116565078
- ChemSpider: 42801715
- UNII: CJ4W8C8Z3P
- CompTox Dashboard (EPA): DTXSID501344462

Chemical and physical data
- Formula: C_{10}H_{11}F_{2}NO
- Molar mass: 199.201 g·mol^{−1}
- 3D model (JSmol): Interactive image
- SMILES: CC(C(=O)C1=CC(=CC(=C1)F)F)NC
- InChI: InChI=1S/C10H11F2NO/c1-6(13-2)10(14)7-3-8(11)5-9(12)4-7/h3-6,13H,1-2H3; Key:RRHMVNNNKJWOAZ-UHFFFAOYSA-N

3,5-Difluoromethcathinone (also known as 3,5-DFMC) is a chemical compound from the cathinone family that has been sold as a designer drug, first being identified in Australia in 2009.

== Legal status ==
In the United Kingdom, 3,5-DFMC is a controlled drug under the cathinone blanket ban.

3,5-DFMC is an Anlage II controlled drug in Germany.

== See also ==
- 3-Fluoroamphetamine
- 3-Fluoroethamphetamine
- 3-Fluoromethamphetamine
- 3-Fluoromethcathinone
- 3,4-Difluoroamphetamine
- Manifaxine
- Substituted cathinone
