= C10H14ClN =

The molecular formula C_{10}H_{14}ClN may refer to:

- para-Chloromethamphetamine
- 3-Chloromethamphetamine
- 4-Chlorophenylisobutylamine
- Chlorphentermine
- Clortermine
- N,N-Dimethyl-2-chloro-2-phenylethylamine
- N-Ethyl-N-(2-chloroethyl)aniline
