= C8H10ClN =

The molecular formula C_{8}H_{10}ClN (molar mass : 155.63 g/mol) may refer to:

- 2-Chloro-2-phenylethylamine
- para-Chlorophenethylamine
