= Chlorophenethylamine =

Chlorophenethylamine may refer to:

- para-Chlorophenethylamine
- 2-Chloro-2-phenylethylamine (β-chlorophenethylamine)
