= Dichloroamphetamine =

Dichloroamphetamine may refer to:

- 2,4-Dichloroamphetamine
- 3,4-Dichloroamphetamine
