= 3,4-Difluoroamphetamine =

Designer drug of the substituted amphetamine class

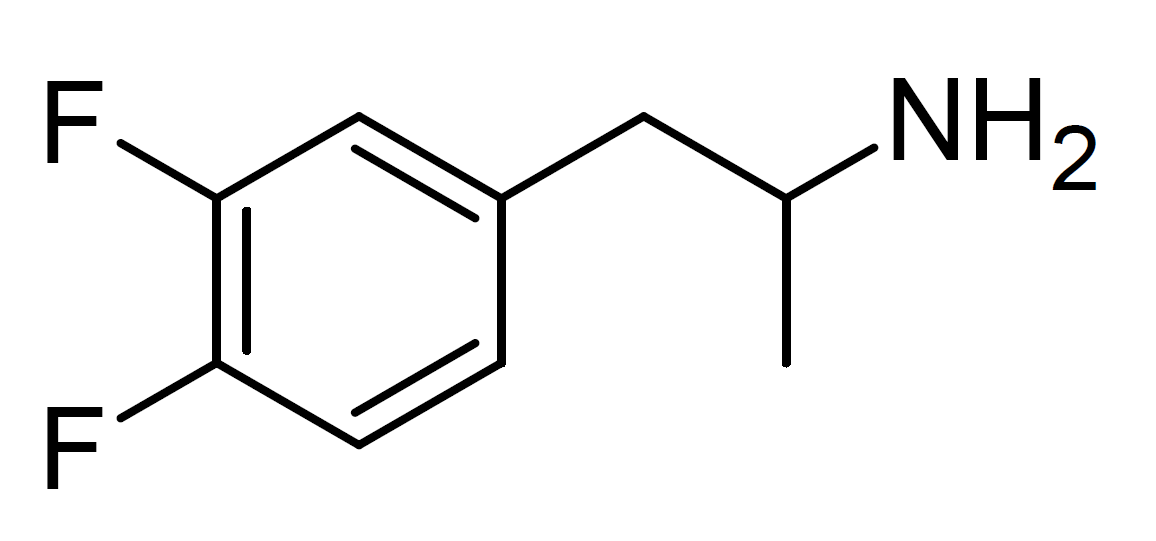

Identifiers
- IUPAC name: 1-(3-Chlorophenyl)-N-methylpropan-2-amine
- CAS Number: 31338-32-6
- PubChem CID: 11182888
- ChemSpider: 9357973
- CompTox Dashboard (EPA): DTXSID80457891

Chemical and physical data
- Formula: C_{9}H_{11}F_{2}N
- Molar mass: 171.191 g·mol^{−1}
- 3D model (JSmol): Interactive image
- SMILES: CC(CC1=CC(=C(C=C1)F)F)N
- InChI: InChI=1S/C9H11F2N/c1-6(12)4-7-2-3-8(10)9(11)5-7/h2-3,5-6H,4,12H2,1H3; Key:GJEXOPSQWJWJRQ-UHFFFAOYSA-N

3,4-Difluoroamphetamine (DFA) is a substituted amphetamine which has been sold as a designer drug. It has relatively weak activity as a serotonin releasing agent with only around 1/4 of the affinity for the serotonin transporter compared to MDA, but its activity at other targets has not been studied.

== See also ==
- 3-Fluoroamphetamine
- 3-Fluoromethamphetamine
- 4-Fluoroamphetamine
- 4-Fluoromethamphetamine
- 3,5-Difluoromethcathinone
- DFMDA
- DODC
- Xylopropamine
