= C9H11Cl2N =

The molecular formula C_{9}H_{11}Cl_{2}N may refer to:

- 2,4-Dichloroamphetamine
- 3,4-Dichloroamphetamine
