= Pima =

Pima or PIMA may refer to:

== People ==
- Pima people, the Akimel O'odham, Indigenous peoples in Arizona (U.S.) and Sonora (Mexico)

== Places ==
- Pima, Arizona, a town in Graham County
- Pima County, Arizona
- Pima Canyon, in the Santa Catalina Mountains
- Pima, Burkina Faso, a village
- Pima villages, historical villages of the Pima people

== Other ==
- para-Iodomethamphetamine
- PIMA, the Portable Infrared Mineral Analyzer, a type of Infrared Spectroscopy
- Pima (moth), a snout moth genus of tribe Phycitini
- Pima cotton
- Pacific Islands Museums Association
