= 2-Chloroamphetamine =

Clinical data
- Other names: 2-CA; ortho-Chloroamphetamine; o-Chloroamphetamine; OCA; o-CA
- Drug class: Monoamine releasing agent

Identifiers
- IUPAC name: 1-(2-chlorophenyl)propan-2-amine
- CAS Number: 21193-23-7
- PubChem CID: 152331
- ChemSpider: 134269
- UNII: 00Q9Z0HNOQ
- ChEBI: CHEBI:180535
- CompTox Dashboard (EPA): DTXSID40943523

Chemical and physical data
- Formula: C_{9}H_{12}ClN
- Molar mass: 169.65 g·mol^{−1}
- 3D model (JSmol): Interactive image
- SMILES: CC(CC1=CC=CC=C1Cl)N
- InChI: InChI=1S/C9H12ClN/c1-7(11)6-8-4-2-3-5-9(8)10/h2-5,7H,6,11H2,1H3; Key:IQHHOHJDIZRBGM-UHFFFAOYSA-N

2-Chloroamphetamine (2-CA), also known as ortho-chloroamphetamine (OCA), is a monoamine releasing agent (MRA) of the amphetamine family related to 2-fluoroamphetamine (2-FA).

== Pharmacology ==
=== Pharmacodynamics ===
It has been found to induce the release of norepinephrine and dopamine in rat brain synaptosomes with EC_{50} values of 19.1 and 62.4 nM, respectively, whereas serotonin was not reported. It has been found to also induce the release of serotonin in mouse brain slices to some degree, whereas it did not induce the release of serotonin in the brain in rats in vivo.

In contrast to amphetamine and para-chloroamphetamine (PCA; 4-chloroamphetamine), 2-CA does not appear to produce hyperlocomotion in mice, and instead has been found to decrease locomotor activity. However, it did potentiate the effects of levodopa similarly to amphetamine and PCA. On the other hand, like amphetamine but in contrast to PCA and 4-methylamphetamine (4-MA), 2-CA did not potentiate the effects of 5-hydroxytryptophan (5-HTP). Unlike PCA, 2-CA did not produce the head-twitch response, a behavioral proxy of psychedelic-like effects, in mice.

In contrast to PCA, but similarly to amphetamine, 2-CA does not appear to produce serotonergic neurotoxicity in rats or guinea pigs. While this could be attributed to rapid metabolism in the case of 3-chloroamphetamine (3-CA), 2-CA continued to lack serotonergic neurotoxicity even when its metabolism was inhibited by desipramine.
