= Benzilylcholine mustard =

Names
- Preferred IUPAC name 2-[(2-Chloroethyl)methylamino]ethyl hydroxydi(phenyl)acetate
- Other names N-2-chloroethyl-N-methyl 2-aminoethyl benzilate, α-Hydroxy-α-phenylbenzeneacetic acid 2-[(2-chloroethyl)methylamino]ethyl ester

Identifiers
CAS Number	5746-42-9
3D model (JSmol)	Interactive image
ChemSpider	4955866
PubChem CID	6453495
UNII	3KYG5U8PYV
CompTox Dashboard (EPA)	DTXSID50206070
- InChI: InChI=1S/C19H22ClNO3/c1-21(13-12-20)14-15-24-18(22)19(23,16-8-4-2-5-9-16)17-10-6-3-7-11-17/h2-11,23H,12-15H2,1H3 Key: QMMKHOXGBKDMKE-UHFFFAOYSA-N
- SMILES: CN(CCOC(=O)C(C1=CC=CC=C1)(C2=CC=CC=C2)O)CCCl

Properties
Chemical formula	C_{19}H_{22}ClNO_{3}
Molar mass	347.836 g/mol
- Except where otherwise noted, data are given for materials in their standard state (at 25 °C [77 °F], 100 kPa). verify (what is ?) Infobox references

Benzilylcholine mustard (N-2-chloroethyl-N-methyl 2-aminoethyl benzilate) is a modified version of acetylcholine, so named because after cyclization in solution it forms an aziridinium derivative that is structurally similar to benzilylcholine. It is well known for being an irreversible antagonist of the muscarinic acetylcholine receptor. It has been used in pharmacological experiments investigating the relationship between receptor occupancy and response. It was also one of the tools in characterization of the muscarinic acetylcholine receptor.

== Mechanism ==
On the muscarinic acetylcholine receptor, benzilylcholine mustard acts as an alkylating agent at two sites, one site being the acetylcholine recognition site itself, and the other a site that stabilises the receptor in its inactive state. Groups that can be alkylated in this way include thiols, alcohols, imines and carboxylic acids.
