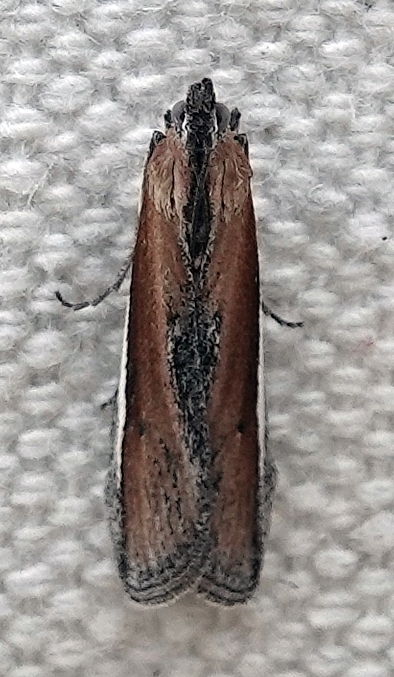

Scientific classification
- Domain: Eukaryota
- Kingdom: Animalia
- Phylum: Arthropoda
- Class: Insecta
- Order: Lepidoptera
- Family: Pyralidae
- Genus: Pima
- Species: P. occidentalis

Binomial name
- Pima occidentalis Heinrich, 1956

= Pima occidentalis =

Species of moth

Pima occidentalis is a species of snout moth. It is found in the south-western United States.

There are two generations per year in Texas, New Mexico and Arizona.

The larvae feed on Astragalus species, including Astragalus allochrous, Astragalus thurberi and Astragalus wootonii, as well as Lathyrus species.

== Taxonomy ==
Pima occidentalis was formerly treated as a subspecies of Pima albiplagiatella.
