= Org 6582 =

Chemical compound

Identifiers
- IUPAC name: (1S,9S,13R)-5-chlorotricyclo[7.3.1.0^{2,7}]trideca-2(7),3,5,10-tetraen-13-amine
- CAS Number: 71154-53-5 59905-71-4 (hydrochloride)
- PubChem CID: 133082268
- ChemSpider: 39287
- UNII: PBK0DLA6ZX

Chemical and physical data
- Formula: C_{13}H_{14}ClN
- Molar mass: 219.71 g·mol^{−1}
- 3D model (JSmol): Interactive image
- SMILES: C1C=C[C@@H]2CC3=C([C@H]1[C@@H]2N)C=CC(=C3)Cl
- InChI: InChI=1S/C13H14ClN/c14-10-4-5-11-9(7-10)6-8-2-1-3-12(11)13(8)15/h1-2,4-5,7-8,12-13H,3,6,15H2/t8-,12+,13-/m1/s1; Key:OQLNPMOPMXMVAH-OXHMUOHRSA-N

Org 6582 is a selective serotonin reuptake inhibitor (SSRI) which was never marketed.

It is an analogue of para-chloroamphetamine (PCA) and 6-chloro-2-aminotetralin (6-CAT).

== See also ==
- Metazocine – structural analog that is a functional opioid instead of MAT inhibitor
