= Para-Chlorophenethylamine =

Chemical compound

para-Chlorophenethylamine

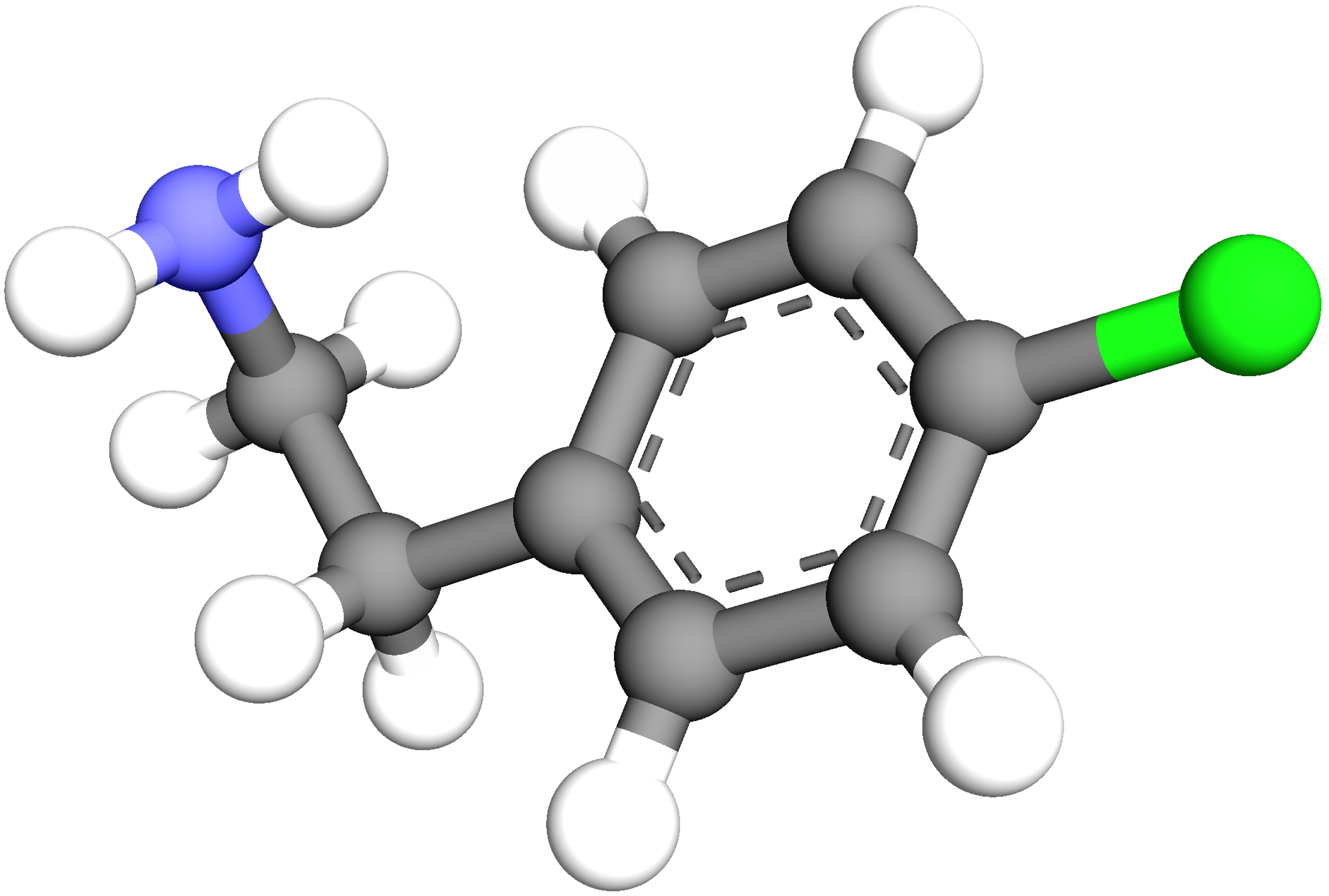

Clinical data
- Drug class: serotonergic agent; serotonin-releasing agent; monoamine-depleting agent
- ATC code: none

Identifiers
- IUPAC name: 2-(4-chlorophenyl)ethanamine
- CAS Number: 156-41-2
- PubChem CID: 67430
- ChemSpider: 60755
- ChEMBL: ChEMBL477764
- CompTox Dashboard (EPA): 40166018

Chemical and physical data
- Formula: C_{8}H_{10}ClN
- Molar mass: 155.63 g·mol^{−1}
- 3D model (JSmol): Interactive image
- SMILES: C1=CC(=CC=C1CCN)Cl
- InChI: InChI=1S/C8H10ClN/c9-8-3-1-7(2-4-8)5-6-10/h1-4H,5-6,10H2; Key:SRXFXCKTIGELTI-UHFFFAOYSA-N

para-Chlorophenethylamine (pCPE) also known as 4-chlorophenylethylamine, is a potent serotonergic drug that is a structural analog of para-chloroamphetamine, lacking a methyl group at the α-carbon.

== Pharmacology ==
=== Pharmacodynamics ===
para-Chlorophenethylamine acts primarily as a serotonin-releasing agent with an EC_{50} value of 430 nM for the serotonin transporter, approximately the dose required to induce serotonin syndrome with seizures, tremor, and hyperthermia in mice, is quite low compared to other derivatives (such as ortho-chlorophenethylamine and meta-chlorophenethylamine) In mice with serotonin syndrome induced by para-chlorophenethylamine, the following symptoms were observed: lateral head bobbing, a Straub tail reaction, abduction of the hind limbs, tremors, hyperactivity, mutual pawing with the front paws, salivation, and piloerection. It acts as a full, weak agonist of TAAR with an EC_{50} value of 2,900 ± 1,000 nM.

In vitro, it inhibited the activity of the enzyme phenylethanolamine N-methyltransferase. Para-chlorophenelethylamine stimulated 5-HT receptors.

=== Pharmacokinetics ===
para-Chlorophenethylamine is a known metabolite of the para-chlorophenylalanine (fenclonine); it rapidly accumulated in the brain following administration of fenclonine.

== Drug control ==
Para-chlorophenylethylamine is a controlled substance in Hungary, classified under the category "New Psychoactive Substances"

== See also ==
- para-Chloroamphetamine
- para-Chloromethamphetamine
- 2-Chloro-2-phenethylamine
- β-Methyl-4-chlorophenethylamine
