= Iofetamine (123I) =

Pair of enantiomers

Iofetamine (^{123}I)

Clinical data
- ATC code: V09AB01 (WHO)

Legal status
- Legal status: In general: ℞ (Prescription only)

Pharmacokinetic data
- Protein binding: <10%

Identifiers
- IUPAC name: 1-[4-(^{123}I)iodophenyl]-N-isopropyl-2-propanamine
- CAS Number: 75917-92-9 85068-76-4 (non-labeled) 95896-48-3 (^{123}I-labeled HCl)
- PubChem CID: 156375
- ChemSpider: 137706
- UNII: LV23B78IJC
- ChEMBL: ChEMBL1201308
- CompTox Dashboard (EPA): DTXSID50997294

Chemical and physical data
- Formula: C_{12}H_{18}^{123}IN
- Molar mass: 299.278 g/mol
- 3D model (JSmol): Interactive image
- SMILES: CC(C)NC(C)Cc1ccc(cc1)I
- InChI: InChI=1S/C12H18IN/c1-9(2)14-10(3)8-11-4-6-12(13)7-5-11/h4-7,9-10,14H,8H2,1-3H3/i13-4; Key:ISEHJSHTIVKELA-DCWJVSPSSA-N

Iofetamine (iodine-123, ^{123}I), brand names Perfusamine, SPECTamine), or N-isopropyl-(^{123}I)-p-iodoamphetamine (IMP), is a lipid-soluble amine and radiopharmaceutical drug used in cerebral blood perfusion imaging with single-photon emission computed tomography (SPECT). Labeled with the radioactive isotope iodine-123, it is approved for use in the United States as a diagnostic aid in determining the localization of and in the evaluation of non-lacunar stroke and complex partial seizures, as well as in the early diagnosis of Alzheimer's disease.

An analogue of amphetamine, iofetamine has shown to inhibit the reuptake of serotonin and norepinephrine as well as induce the release of these neurotransmitters and of dopamine with similar potencies to other amphetamines like d-amphetamine and p-chloroamphetamine. In addition, on account of its high lipophilicity, iofetamine rapidly penetrates the blood–brain barrier. Accordingly, though not known to have been reported in the medical literature, iofetamine might have stimulant or entactogen effects. However, it might also be neurotoxic to serotonergic and dopaminergic neurons similarly to other para-halogenated amphetamines.

== See also ==
- p-Iodoamphetamine
- N-Isopropylamphetamine
