= 3-Fluoroethamphetamine =

Stimulant drug of the amphetamine class

Clinical data
- ATC code: none

Legal status
- Legal status: CA: Schedule I; DE: NpSG (Industrial and scientific use only); UK: Class A

Identifiers
- IUPAC name: N-ethyl-1-(3-fluorophenyl)propan-2-amine
- CAS Number: 54982-43-3
- PubChem CID: 57458869
- ChemSpider: 27050449
- UNII: 7ZY9F4B6GT
- CompTox Dashboard (EPA): DTXSID201029433

Chemical and physical data
- Formula: C_{11}H_{16}FN
- Molar mass: 181.254 g·mol^{−1}
- 3D model (JSmol): Interactive image
- SMILES: CC(CC1=CC(F)=CC=C1)NCC
- InChI: InChI=1S/C11H16FN/c1-3-13-9(2)7-10-5-4-6-11(12)8-10/h4-6,8-9,13H,3,7H2,1-2H3; Key:CKPWHLGHHXSVJI-UHFFFAOYSA-N

3-Fluoroethamphetamine (3-FEA) is a stimulant drug of the amphetamine class which acts as a releasing agent of the monoamine neurotransmitters norepinephrine, dopamine and serotonin.

Compared to the unsubstituted ethylamphetamine, 3-fluoroethamphetamine is a weaker releaser of noradrenaline, but a stronger releaser of both dopamine and serotonin, and produced the strongest reinforcing effects in animal studies out of a range of 3-substituted ethamphetamine derivatives tested, despite not being the most potent dopamine releaser.

== See also ==
- 2-Fluoroamphetamine
- 2-Fluoromethamphetamine
- 3-Fluoroamphetamine
- 3-Fluoromethamphetamine
- 4-Fluoroamphetamine
- 4-Fluoromethamphetamine
- Fenfluramine
