= Β-Methyl-4-chlorophenethylamine =

β-Me-4-CPE

Clinical data
- Other names: β-Me-4-Cl-PEA; β-Me-4-CPE;4-chloro-beta-methylphenethylamine; para-chloro-beta-methylphenylamine; p-chloro-beta-methylphenylamine; para-chloro-BMPEA
- Drug class: Serotonergic drug; serotonin-depleting agent; MAO-B inhibitor

Identifiers
- CAS Number: 4806-79-5
- PubChem CID: 107341
- ChemSpider: 96604
- UNII: OJC269166D
- CompTox Dashboard (EPA): 30963992
- ECHA InfoCard: 100.023.059

Chemical and physical data
- Formula: C_{9}H_{12}ClN
- Molar mass: 169.65 g·mol^{−1}
- 3D model (JSmol): Interactive image
- SMILES: CC(CN)C1=CC=C(C=C1)Cl
- InChI: InChI=1S/C9H12ClN/c1-7(6-11)8-2-4-9(10)5-3-8/h2-5,7H,6,11H2,1H3; Key:FLACJAGRDZAFJF-UHFFFAOYSA-N

β-Methyl-4-chlorophenethylamine (β-Me-4-Cl-PEA or β-Me-4-CPE) It is a serotonergic drug from the substituted phenethylamine family, being a derivative of phenethylamine (PEA) that is halogenated at the para-position of the benzene ring and methylated at the beta-carbon of the ethylamine chain. It is related to the compounds BMPEA, 4-CA, and 4-CPE, contributing to the depletion of serotonin levels in the brain and, in high doses, inducing serotonin syndrome. This drug is also a competitive inhibitor of the MAO-B enzyme. β-Me-4-CPE induced serotonin syndrome, with symptoms including head tremor, forepaw movement, and widely spaced hind limbs. Although a 20 mg/kg dose failed to induce anything in four of the rats, a 30 mg/kg dose caused partial effects in one rat, and a 40 mg/kg dose induced it in all. The syndrome begins within 3–10 minutes and lasts between 10 and 30 minutes, depending on the dose. It affected serotonin levels, that is, reduced serotonin levels to 83% (compared to 78% for pCPE). The effects on norepinephrine and dopamine were not significantly affected (95% and 97%, respectively), and there is also an absence of changes in monoamine concentration after 3 days.
