= Pima flavidorsella =

Scientific classification
- Domain: Eukaryota
- Kingdom: Animalia
- Phylum: Arthropoda
- Class: Insecta
- Order: Lepidoptera
- Family: Pyralidae
- Genus: Pima
- Species: P. flavidorsella

Binomial name
- Pima flavidorsella de Joannis, 1927

Synonyms
- Pima flavidorsella var. cinerella de Joannis, 1927

Species of moth

Pima flavidorsella is a species of snout moth. It lives in Mozambique.
