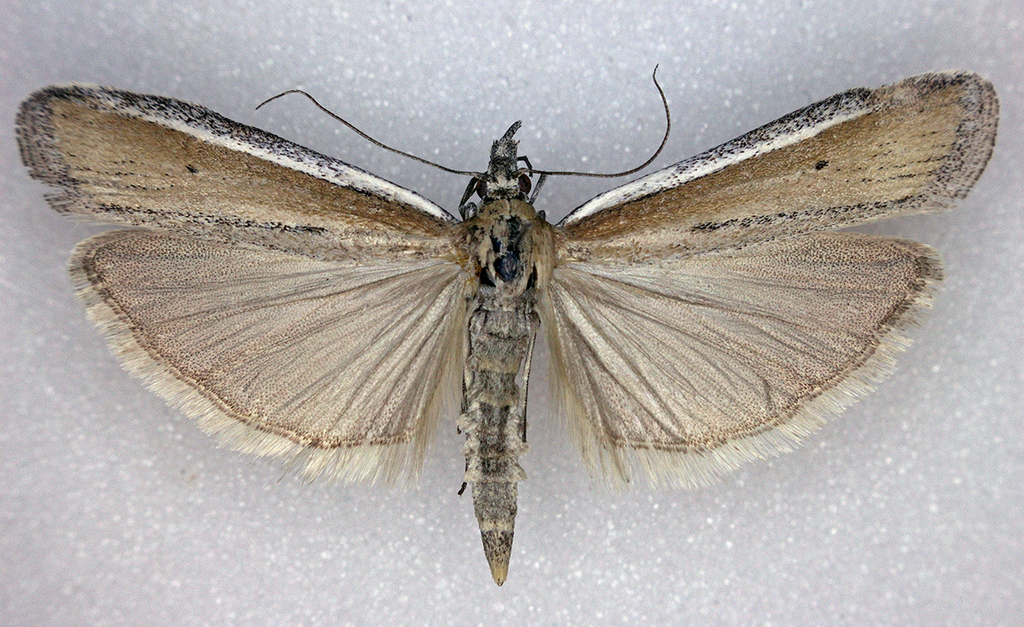

Scientific classification
- Domain: Eukaryota
- Kingdom: Animalia
- Phylum: Arthropoda
- Class: Insecta
- Order: Lepidoptera
- Family: Pyralidae
- Genus: Pima
- Species: P. fosterella

Binomial name
- Pima fosterella Hulst, 1888

= Pima fosterella =

Species of moth

Pima fosterella is a species of snout moth. It is found in North America, including Alberta, Washington, Colorado, Utah and New Mexico.
