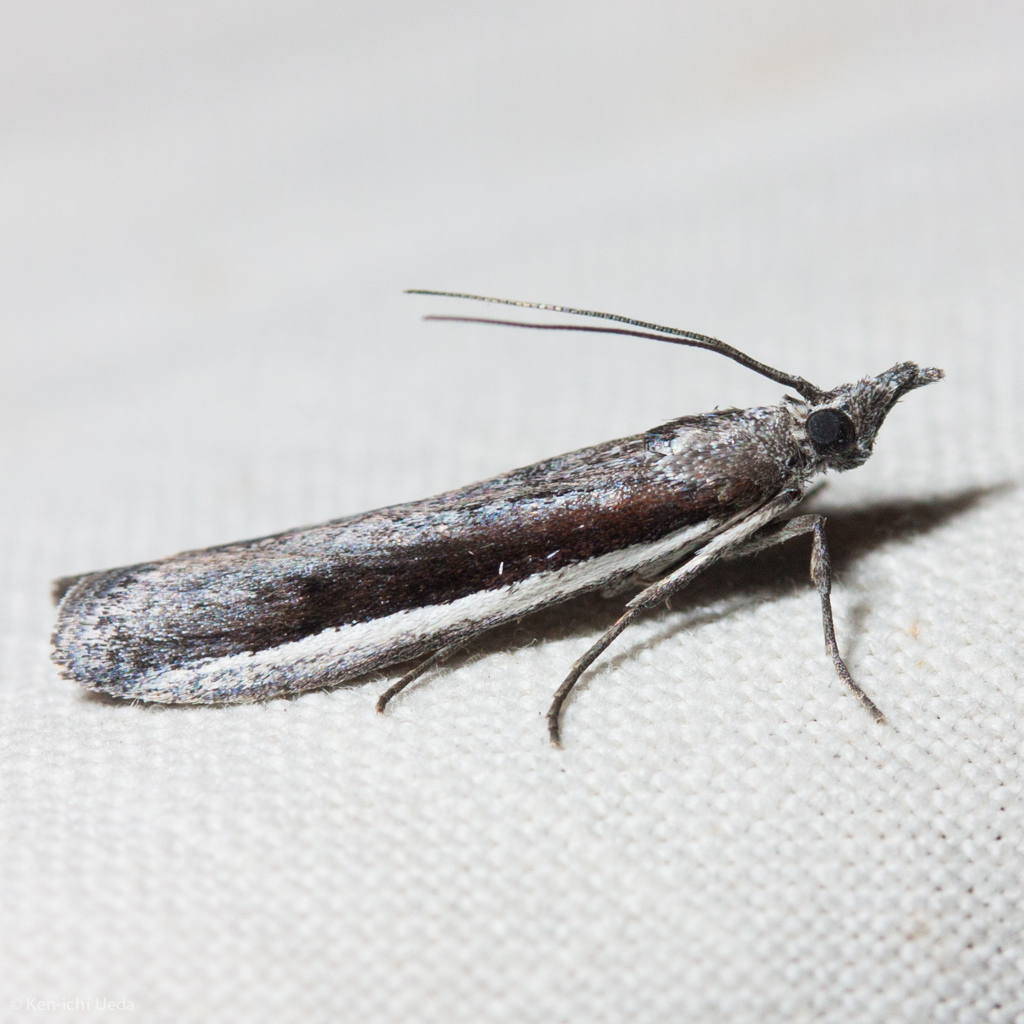

Scientific classification
- Domain: Eukaryota
- Kingdom: Animalia
- Phylum: Arthropoda
- Class: Insecta
- Order: Lepidoptera
- Family: Pyralidae
- Genus: Pima
- Species: P. albocostalialis

Binomial name
- Pima albocostalialis (Hulst, 1886)

Synonyms
- Ephestia albocostalialis Hulst, 1886; Pima albocostialis; Epischnia subcostella Ragonot, 1887; Epischnia albocostalis Hulst, 1890; Pima albocostalis

= Pima albocostalialis =

Species of moth

Pima albocostalialis is a species of snout moth. It is found in western North America, including California, Colorado, Utah, Alberta and British Columbia.
