= Para-Bromomethamphetamine =

PBMA

Clinical data
- Other names: PBMA; 4-Bromomethamphetamine; 4-BMA; p-Bromomethamphetamine; p-BMA; V-111; 4-Bromo-N-methylamphetamine; 4-Bromo-N-methylphenylisopropylamine
- ATC code: None

Identifiers
- IUPAC name: 1-(4-bromophenyl)-N-methylpropan-2-amine
- CAS Number: 4302-85-6
- PubChem CID: 107257
- ChemSpider: 96526
- CompTox Dashboard (EPA): DTXSID40962850

Chemical and physical data
- Formula: C_{10}H_{14}BrN
- Molar mass: 228.133 g·mol^{−1}
- 3D model (JSmol): Interactive image
- SMILES: CC(CC1=CC=C(C=C1)Br)NC
- InChI: InChI=1S/C10H14BrN/c1-8(12-2)7-9-3-5-10(11)6-4-9/h3-6,8,12H,7H2,1-2H3; Key:RHHFGACRACGCQS-UHFFFAOYSA-N

para-Bromomethamphetamine (PBMA; developmental code name V-111), also known as 4-bromomethamphetamine (4-BMA), is a monoaminergic drug of the amphetamine family related to para-chloroamphetamine (PCA; 4-chloroamphetamine). It was studied by József Knoll and colleagues in the 1970s and 1980s.

== Pharmacology ==
Originally thought to selectively act on serotonin, PBMA was subsequently found to act not only on serotonin but also on norepinephrine and dopamine similarly to PCA. It has been reported to produce pharmacological effects that have been said to be "somewhat similar" or "indistinguishable" to those of lysergic acid diethylamide (LSD) and various other hallucinogens in various animal species. However, when the drug was subsequently tested in humans, it showed no hallucinogenic effects whatsoever. This is analogous to the case of PCA, which can produce the head-twitch response in rodents but is not hallucinogenic in humans. The hallucinogen-like effects of PBMA in animals can be reversed by the serotonin synthesis inhibitor para-chlorophenylalanine (PCPA), suggesting that they are due to elevation of serotonin levels rather than direct serotonin receptor agonism.

Other animal studies have found PBMA to produce stimulant, appetite suppressant, pro-cognitive-like, anticonvulsant, and sleep-disrupting effects. Besides its effects, the pharmacokinetics and metabolism of PBMA have been studied in rodents.

PBMA produces serotonergic neurotoxicity of a similar magnitude to PCA and para-bromoamphetamine (PBA) in rodents. Conversely, para-fluoroamphetamine (PFA; 4-fluoroamphetamine) is much less effective.

== See also ==
- 4-Bromomethcathinone
- 4-Fluoromethamphetamine
- para-Chloromethamphetamine
- para-Iodoamphetamine
- 2,5-Dimethoxy-4-bromoamphetamine
