= Ammonia kinase =

ammonia kinase

Identifiers
- EC no.: 2.7.3.8
- CAS no.: 37278-16-3

Databases
- IntEnz: IntEnz view
- BRENDA: BRENDA entry
- ExPASy: NiceZyme view
- KEGG: KEGG entry
- MetaCyc: metabolic pathway
- PRIAM: profile
- PDB structures: RCSB PDB PDBe PDBsum
- Gene Ontology: AmiGO / QuickGO
Search
- PMC: articles
- PubMed: articles
- NCBI: proteins

In enzymology, an ammonia kinase (EC 2.7.3.8) is an enzyme that catalyzes the chemical reaction

ATP + NH_{3} $\rightleftharpoons$ ADP + phosphoramide

Thus, the two substrates of this enzyme are ATP and NH_{3}, whereas its two products are ADP and phosphoramide.

This enzyme belongs to the family of transferases, specifically those transferring phosphorus-containing groups (phosphotransferases) with a nitrogenous group as acceptor. The systematic name of this enzyme class is ATP:ammonia phosphotransferase. Other names in common use include phosphoramidate-adenosine diphosphate phosphotransferase, and phosphoramidate-ADP-phosphotransferase.
