= Pima granitella =

Scientific classification
- Domain: Eukaryota
- Kingdom: Animalia
- Phylum: Arthropoda
- Class: Insecta
- Order: Lepidoptera
- Family: Pyralidae
- Genus: Pima
- Species: P. granitella

Binomial name
- Pima granitella (Ragonot, 1887)

Synonyms
- Epischnia granitella Ragonot, 1887; Megasis piperella Dyar, 1904

Species of moth

Pima granitella is a species of snout moth. It is found in the south-western United States, as well as Colorado, Utah, Nevada and Washington.

The wingspan is about 29 mm. There are one to two generations per year in Texas, New Mexico and Arizona.

The larvae feed on Astragalus species, including Astragalus allochrous and Astragalus mollissimus, as well as Crotalaria species. Young larvae bore into developing legumes at the base and usually cover the opening with white silk (except when feeding on Astragalus mollissimus). They feed on the seeds. If all seeds of a legume are consumed, a larva may move to another. The larvae have a brown to black body and a pale brownish yellow head. They reach a length of 14.4–22.5 mm. Pupation takes place under debris on the soil, usually after overwintering in a hibernaculum.
