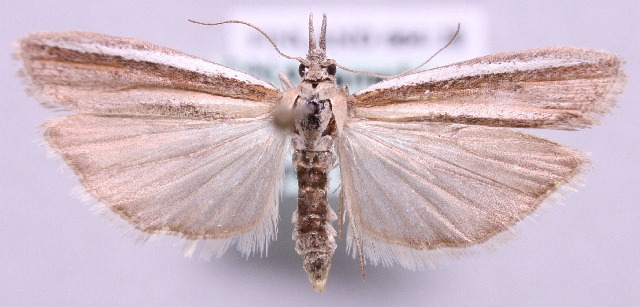

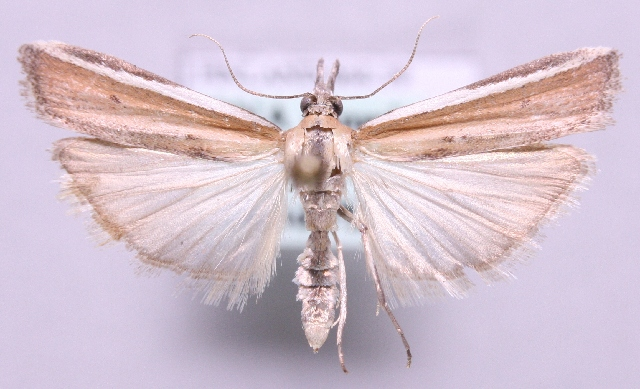

Scientific classification
- Kingdom: Animalia
- Phylum: Arthropoda
- Clade: Pancrustacea
- Class: Insecta
- Order: Lepidoptera
- Family: Pyralidae
- Genus: Pima
- Species: P. boisduvaliella

Binomial name
- Pima boisduvaliella (Guenee, 1845)

Synonyms
- Epischnia boisduvaliella Guenée, 1845; Anerastia farrella J. Curtis, 1850; Pima lefauryella Constant, 1865

= Pima boisduvaliella =

Species of moth

Pima boisduvaliella is a species of snout moth. It is found in most of Europe (except Ireland, the Czech Republic, Slovakia, Ukraine and most of the Balkan Peninsula), Asia, including Mongolia and Kazakhstan and northern North America, including Alberta.

The wingspan is 22–26 mm. Adults are on wing from June to August.

The larvae feed on Anthyllis, Lotus, (including Lotus corniculatus), Ononis, Astragalus and Lathyrus maritimus. They feed inside the pods of their host plants.
