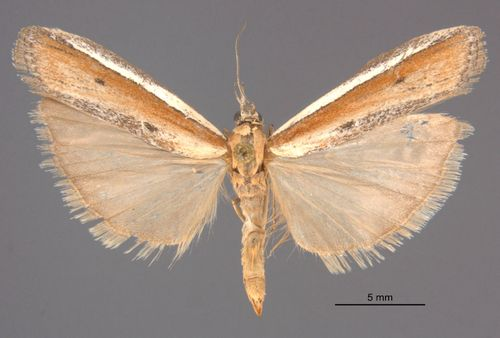

Scientific classification
- Domain: Eukaryota
- Kingdom: Animalia
- Phylum: Arthropoda
- Class: Insecta
- Order: Lepidoptera
- Family: Pyralidae
- Genus: Pima
- Species: P. fulvirugella

Binomial name
- Pima fulvirugella (Ragonot, 1887)

Synonyms
- Epischnia fulvirugella Ragonot, 1887; Epischnia vividella McDunnough, 1935

= Pima fulvirugella =

Species of moth

Pima fulvirugella is a species of snout moth. It is found in North America, including Alberta and California.
