= Pima fergusoni =

Scientific classification
- Domain: Eukaryota
- Kingdom: Animalia
- Phylum: Arthropoda
- Class: Insecta
- Order: Lepidoptera
- Family: Pyralidae
- Genus: Pima
- Species: P. fergusoni

Binomial name
- Pima fergusoni Neunzig, 2003

Species of moth

Pima fergusoni is a species of snout moth. It is found in North America, including Oregon and California.
