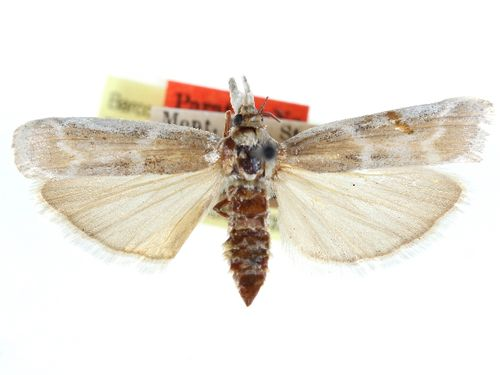

Scientific classification
- Domain: Eukaryota
- Kingdom: Animalia
- Phylum: Arthropoda
- Class: Insecta
- Order: Lepidoptera
- Family: Pyralidae
- Genus: Pima
- Species: P. parkerella

Binomial name
- Pima parkerella (Schaus, 1924)

Synonyms
- Epischnia parkerella Schaus, 1924

= Pima parkerella =

Species of moth

Pima parkerella is a species of snout moth. It is found in North America, including Montana.
