= Para-Chloromethamphetamine =

Chemical compound

PCMA

Clinical data
- Other names: Ro 4-6861; PCMA; CMA; 4-Chloromethamphetamine; 4-CMA

Legal status
- Legal status: DE: NpSG (Industrial and scientific use only); UK: Class B

Identifiers
- IUPAC name: 1-(4-Chlorophenyl)-N-methylpropan-2-amine
- CAS Number: 30572-91-9
- PubChem CID: 3128
- ChemSpider: 3016
- UNII: IXP5G5WMYA
- CompTox Dashboard (EPA): DTXSID00897230

Chemical and physical data
- Formula: C_{10}H_{14}ClN
- Molar mass: 183.68 g·mol^{−1}
- 3D model (JSmol): Interactive image
- SMILES: ClC1=CC=C(C=C1)CC(C)NC
- InChI: InChI=1S/C10H14ClN/c1-8(12-2)7-9-3-5-10(11)6-4-9/h3-6,8,12H,7H2,1-2H3; Key:XXLWNLKEOWWHDC-UHFFFAOYSA-N

para-Chloromethamphetamine (PCMA; also known as 4-chloromethamphetamine and 4-CMA; code name Ro 4-6861) is a stimulant that is the N-methyl derivative and prodrug of the neurotoxic drug para-chloroamphetamine (4-CA). It has been found to decrease serotonin in rats. Further investigation into the long-term effects of chloroamphetamines discovered that administration of 4-CMA caused a prolonged reduction in the levels of serotonin and the activity of tryptophan hydroxylase in the brain one month after injection of a single dose of the drug.

Another study on rats found that 4-chloromethamphetamine was more potent at inducing conditioned taste aversion than methamphetamine.

4-CMA produces the head-twitch response in rodents similarly to 4-CA. This effect of 4-CMA can be blocked by a serotonin reuptake inhibitor.

4-Chloromethamphetamine was further investigated in the 1960s along with 4-CA and it was noted that they differed from their parent amphetamine and methamphetamine substances by exhibiting only a slight central stimulant effect in both animals and humans and that they acted like antidepressants rather than stimulants.

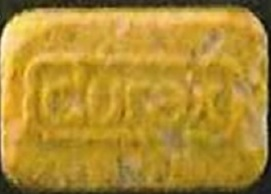
Tablet containing 4-chloromethamphetamine, found in 2015 in Belgium.

Studies in the 1970s found that a single dose of 10 mg/1 kg 4-CMA resulted in a decreased level of serotonin in the brain for several weeks.

4-Chloromethamphetamine was identified outside of the laboratory for the first time at the Tomorrowland festival edition 2015, where a tablet was found in possession of a drug dealer (see picture). In the following year, tablets with 4–CMA were also found in Romania, Austria and Croatia. Fortuitously, and for unknown reasons, 4-CMA disappeared briefly from the European rave scene after the Spring of 2016. However, a 2019 study of participants of a dance music festival in Belgium reported detection of 4-CMA in pills (out of 178 analyzed samples only one was mostly 4-CMA, while in one other 4-CMA was a minor ingredient).

== See also ==
- Substituted amphetamine
- 3-Chloromethamphetamine
- 4-Bromoamphetamine
- 4-Bromomethamphetamine
- 4-Fluoroamphetamine
- 4-Fluoromethamphetamine
- 4-Iodoamphetamine
