= Pima difficilis =

Scientific classification
- Domain: Eukaryota
- Kingdom: Animalia
- Phylum: Arthropoda
- Class: Insecta
- Order: Lepidoptera
- Family: Pyralidae
- Genus: Pima
- Species: P. difficilis

Binomial name
- Pima difficilis de Joannis, 1927

Species of moth

Pima difficilis is a species of snout moth. It is found in Mozambique.
