= Para-Bromoamphetamine =

Chemical compound

para-Bromoamphetamine

Clinical data
- Drug class: Monoamine releasing agent
- ATC code: none

Legal status
- Legal status: DE: NpSG (Industrial and scientific use only); UK: Class A

Identifiers
- IUPAC name: 1-(4-bromophenyl)propan-2-amine
- CAS Number: 18455-37-3
- PubChem CID: 205668
- ChemSpider: 178189
- UNII: 6IBU62D1N2
- ChEMBL: ChEMBL61355
- CompTox Dashboard (EPA): DTXSID90896914

Chemical and physical data
- Formula: C_{9}H_{12}BrN
- Molar mass: 214.106 g·mol^{−1}
- 3D model (JSmol): Interactive image
- SMILES: Brc1ccc(cc1)CC(N)C
- InChI: InChI=1S/C9H12BrN/c1-7(11)6-8-2-4-9(10)5-3-8/h2-5,7H,6,11H2,1H3; Key:SMNXUMMCCOZPPN-UHFFFAOYSA-N

para-Bromoamphetamine (PBA), also known as 4-bromoamphetamine (4-BA), is an amphetamine derivative which acts as a serotonin-norepinephrine-dopamine releasing agent (SNDRA) and produces stimulant effects.

Another related compound is para-bromomethamphetamine (PBMA) known by the codename V-111.

== Pharmacology ==
PBA has been found to be a monoamine oxidase A (MAO-A) inhibitor, with an IC_{50} of 1,500 nM.

== Neurotoxicity ==
Like most other para-substituted amphetamines, PBA can be neurotoxic and may deplete the brain of 5-hydroxyindoles for at least a week.

== 6-BAT ==
Given that 6-CAT is a non-neurotoxic version of para-chloroamphetamine, it is worth considering 6-BAT as well.

6-BAT

The chemical name for this is 6-Bromo-1,2,3,4-tetrahydronaphthalen-2-amine or 6-bromo-2-aminotetralin [167355-41-1] [867-970-2]. The synthesis method is disclosed (Ex 32). The precursor is called 6-Bromo-2-tetralone [4133-35-1] [640-168-8] (Ex 16).

== See also ==
- Substituted amphetamines
- 4-Bromomethcathinone (4-BMC)
- 4-Fluoroamphetamine (4-FA)
- para-Chloroamphetamine (PCA)
- para-Iodoamphetamine (PIA)
- para-Bromomethamphetamine (PBMA)
