= 3-Chloromethamphetamine =

Substituted amphetamine derivative invented in the 1960s

Clinical data
- Other names: 3-CMA; MCMA; 3-Chloro-N-methylamphetamine
- ATC code: None

Legal status
- Legal status: CA: Schedule I; DE: NpSG (Industrial and scientific use only); UK: Class A

Identifiers
- IUPAC name: 1-(3-Chlorophenyl)-N-methylpropan-2-amine
- CAS Number: 77481-92-6
- PubChem CID: 24257264
- ChemSpider: 23900073
- UNII: 57PE8W8UUF

Chemical and physical data
- Formula: C_{10}H_{14}ClN
- Molar mass: 183.68 g·mol^{−1}
- 3D model (JSmol): Interactive image
- SMILES: CNC(Cc1cccc(c1)Cl)C
- InChI: InChI=1S/C10H14ClN/c1-8(12-2)6-9-4-3-5-10(11)7-9/h3-5,7-8,12H,6H2,1-2H3; Key:QLSSITLVZFHSJT-UHFFFAOYSA-N

3-Chloromethamphetamine (3-CMA, MCMA) is a substituted amphetamine derivative invented in the 1960s. In animal studies it was deemed to be a "hallucinogen" rather than a stimulant, though the assays used at the time did not distinguish between the compounds now termed psychedelics and those now termed empathogens.

== See also ==
- 3-Chloroamphetamine
- 3-Chlorocathinone
- 3-Chloromethcathinone
- 4-Chloromethamphetamine
- 3-Fluoromethamphetamine
- 3-Methoxymethamphetamine
- 5-Cl-bk-MPA
- Fenfluramine
