= Fenisorex =

Chemical compound

Clinical data
- ATC code: None

Identifiers
- IUPAC name: (1R,3R)-7-fluoro-N-methyl-1-phenyl-3,4-dihydro-1H-isochromen-3-amine
- CAS Number: 34887-52-0
- PubChem CID: 36983
- ChemSpider: 33935
- UNII: C0P8MP2SR5
- CompTox Dashboard (EPA): DTXSID801031957

Chemical and physical data
- Formula: C_{16}H_{16}FNO
- Molar mass: 257.308 g·mol^{−1}
- 3D model (JSmol): Interactive image
- SMILES: CN[C@H]1Cc2ccc(cc2[C@H](O1)c3ccccc3)F
- InChI: InChI=1S/C16H16FNO/c1-18-15-9-12-7-8-13(17)10-14(12)16(19-15)11-5-3-2-4-6-11/h2-8,10,15-16,18H,9H2,1H3/t15-,16-/m1/s1; Key:HEXAHJRXDZDVLR-HZPDHXFCSA-N

Fenisorex (INN, USAN, BAN) is an amphetamine-like anorectic drug which does not appear to have ever been marketed.
