= Inactivation =

Inactivation may refer to:

- Inactivated vaccine, a vaccine that consists of viruses which are grown in culture and then killed
- RNA interference, also called RNA inactivation, a system that regulates the activity of genes
- X-inactivation, also called lyonization, a process by which one of the two copies of the x chromosome present in female mammals is inactivated
