= N,N-Dimethyl-2-chloro-2-phenylethylamine =

Names
- IUPAC name 2-Chloro-N,N-dimethyl-2-phenylethanamine

Identifiers
CAS Number	6407-17-6
3D model (JSmol)	Interactive image
ChemSpider	180619
PubChem CID	208446
UNII	F2WN67C3SK
CompTox Dashboard (EPA)	DTXSID101283012
- InChI: InChI=1S/C10H14ClN/c1-12(2)8-10(11)9-6-4-3-5-7-9/h3-7,10H,8H2,1-2H3 Key: BHDHMUNVUMGSIY-UHFFFAOYSA-N
- SMILES: CN(C)CC(c1ccccc1)Cl

Properties
Chemical formula	C_{10}H_{14}ClN
Molar mass	183.68 g·mol^{−1}
- Except where otherwise noted, data are given for materials in their standard state (at 25 °C [77 °F], 100 kPa). Infobox references

N,N-Dimethyl-2-chloro-2-phenylethylamine (DMEA) is chemical compound that irreversibly inhibits the enzyme acetylcholinesterase. DMEA can cause intoxication in cats, resulting in respiratory failure to death, and progressive damage to the central nervous system in rats. Synthesis of DMEA can be obtained by treating N,N-dimethyl-2-hydroxy-2-phenylethylamine with thionyl chloride (SOCl_{2}).

DMEA, when dissolved water, decomposes into a highly reactive aziridinium ion, N,N-dimethyl-2-phenylaziridinium (DPA). DPA binds to the anionic site of acetylcholinesterase, where it alkylates and irreversibly inhibits the enzyme.

DMEA has been compared to N,N-dimethyl-2-chloro-2-phenyl-1-methylethyl-amine (M-DMEA) and the results show that there is a difference between the degree of adrenergic blocking activity and their immonium ring stability in vitro.

== See also ==
- Acetylcholinesterase inhibitor
