= 3-Fluoroamphetamine =

Psychoactive research chemical

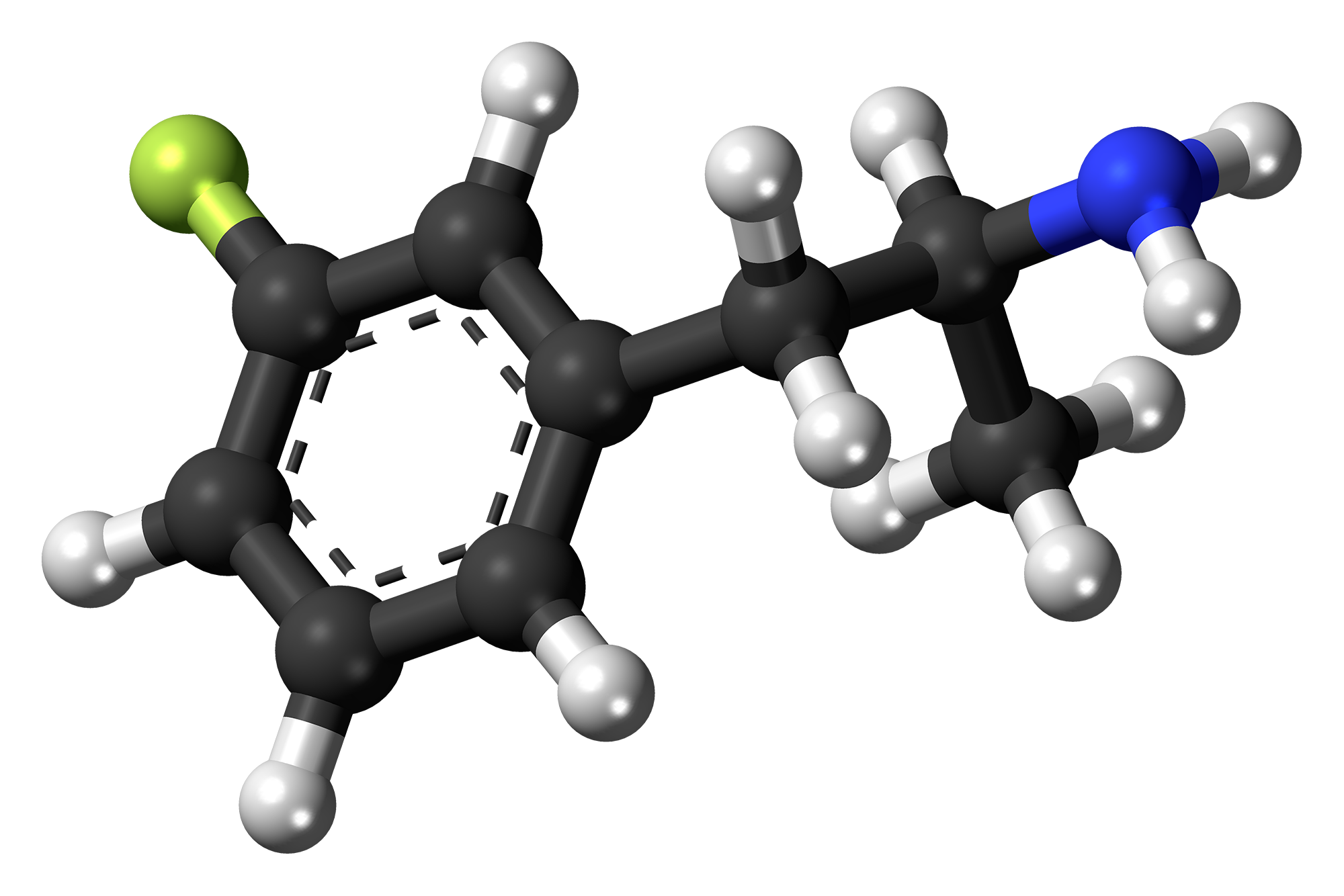

Clinical data
- Trade names: 3FPPA
- Addiction liability: moderate
- Routes of administration: Oral

Legal status
- Legal status: CA: Schedule I; DE: NpSG (Industrial and scientific use only); NZ: Class C; UK: Class A

Pharmacokinetic data
- Onset of action: 20 - 60 minutes
- Elimination half-life: 90 minutes
- Duration of action: 2 - 3 hours "3-FA". Psychonautwiki.

Identifiers
- IUPAC name: (RS)-1-(3-Fluorophenyl)propan-2-amine
- CAS Number: 1626-71-7
- PubChem CID: 121501
- ChemSpider: 108417
- UNII: 4KKW6IBP5X
- CompTox Dashboard (EPA): DTXSID40936718

Chemical and physical data
- Formula: C_{9}H_{12}FN
- Molar mass: 153.200 g·mol^{−1}
- 3D model (JSmol): Interactive image
- Density: 1.0 g/cm^{3}
- Boiling point: 208.2 °C (406.8 °F)
- SMILES: Fc1cccc(c1)CC(C)N
- InChI: InChI=1S/C9H12FN/c1-7(11)5-8-3-2-4-9(10)6-8/h2-4,6-7H,5,11H2,1H3; Key:PIOCLGPCMNPZFT-UHFFFAOYSA-N

3-Fluoroamphetamine (3-FA; PAL-353) is a stimulant drug from the amphetamine family which acts as a monoamine releaser with similar potency to methamphetamine but more selectivity for dopamine and norepinephrine release over serotonin. It is self-administered by mice to a similar extent to related drugs such as 4-fluoroamphetamine and 3-methylamphetamine.

3-Fluoroamphetamine has been used as a designer drug in several studies to mimic the effects of illegal amphetamines. It has also appeared on the drug market for recreational use as an amphetamine alternative, as was reported in January 2009 to the European Early Warning System by Belgium. Little is known about the exact history of this compound.

== Chemistry ==
3-Fluoroamphetamine is a synthetic molecule of the substituted amphetamine class. Molecules in this class contain a phenethylamine core that consists of a phenyl ring, ethyl chain, a terminal amino (NH2) group and a methyl substitution at Rα. Amphetamines themselves belong to the class of alpha-methylated phenethylamines. Substituted amphetamines can be synthesised by substituting a hydrogen atom with a substituent, which in 3-fluoroamphetamine's case is a fluorine atom positioned on the third carbon of the phenyl ring. 3-Fluoroamphetamine has a chemical formula of C9H12FN. At room temperature it is a liquid with molecular mass of 153.200 g·mol−1.

== Pharmacology ==
3-Fluoroamphetamine is a locomotor stimulant that acts as a substrate-based releaser, with selectivity for dopamine over serotonin. This rank order is about the same as for amphetamine when tested in non-human primates. The half life was also comparable to amphetamine when tested in rats, namely 91 minutes. 3-Fluoroamphetamine is a good candidate for transdermal administration since it is a relatively small molecule with a low melting point, has a weak basicity (pKa of 10) and is moderately lipophilic. These properties make it easier to get through the stratum corneum, which is the lipid-rich outermost barrier of the skin. By replacing a hydrogen atom in the ring with a fluorine, the compound is more likely to permeate the blood–brain barrier. The P450 oxidase metabolism will most likely oxidize the 3-fluoroamphetamine at the 4 position, creating 3-fluoro-4-hydroxyamphetamine, which is hypothesized to be aversive to the intake of stimulants.

== Molecular mechanism ==
Like other amphetamine derivatives, 3-Fluoroamphetamine acts as a monoamine releaser with a higher selectivity for dopamine and norepinephrine over serotonin. There are multiple targets at which amphetamines can disrupt the normal function of these neurotransmitters. First, 3-Fluoroamphetamine can interact with their respective transmembrane monoamine transporters DAT, NET, and SERT to mediate neurotransmitter release and reuptake. It does this by blocking these transmembrane transporters, which usually transport monoamines back into the presynapse from the synaptic cleft. Blocking of DAT, NET, and SERT causes prolonged elevated concentrations of dopamine, norepinephrine, and serotonin in the synaptic cleft, causing more stimulant effects associated with these neurotransmitters.

Another way for amphetamine derivatives to influence neurotransmission is by entering the presynapse via DAT, NET, and SERT, where the amphetamine derivative accumulates inside the neuron and replaces monoamines in synaptic vesicles by interacting with vesicular monoamine transporter VMAT2. The concentration of free monoamines in the presynapse increases, prohibiting the inward transport of monoamines and encouraging the outward transport. Furthermore, amphetamine derivatives inhibit the action of mitochondrial monoamine oxidases (MOA), which catalyze the degradation of cytosolic monoamines. Inhibition thus increases cytosolic concentrations of monoamines even more.

The mechanism of action for 3-Fluoroamphetamine has not been individually studied yet, but various sources suggest that amphetamine derivatives generally have the same mechanism of action in monaminergic neurons. Further investigation on 3-Fluoroamphetamine could reveal more specific mechanisms in which this amphetamine derivative modulates‌ processes within the body.

== Uses ==
3-Fluoroamphetamine is distinguished by its potent stimulant and mild entactogenic effects, setting it apart from other amphetamines such as 4-FA, 2-FA, and 2-FMA. It lacks the productivity and focus-enhancing properties reported for 2-FA and 2-FMA, potentially limiting its appeal and availability. Beyond its recreational use, 3-fluoroamphetamine has been identified as a nonselective inhibitor of dopamine and serotonin reuptake, with research suggesting its potential to inhibit cancer cell proliferation in vitro and promote the release of growth factors in neural contexts. These findings point to its utility in neuropharmacological research and possible applications in treating obesity, cancer, and cocaine dependency.

== Legal status ==
China As of October 2015, 3-Fluoroamphetamine is a controlled substance in China.

Finland It is scheduled in the "government decree on substances, preparations and plants considered to be narcotic drugs".

Germany 3-Fluoroamphetamine is controlled under the NpSG (New Psychoactive Substances Act) as of November 26, 2016. Production and import with the aim to place it on the market, administration to another person, and trading is punishable.

New Zealand

3-Fluoroamphetamine is an amphetamine analogue, so it is a Schedule 3 Class C controlled substance in New Zealand.

Switzerland

3-Fluoroamphetamine is a controlled substance specifically named under Verzeichnis E.

Turkey

3-Fluoroamphetamine is a classed as a drug which is illegal to possess, produce, supply, or import.

United Kingdom

3-Fluoroamphetamine is considered a Class A drug as a result of the amphetamine analogue clause of the Misuse of Drugs Act 1971.

United States

3-Fluoroamphetamine may be considered to be an analog of amphetamine, thus falling under the Federal Analogue Act. The Federal Analogue Act, 21 U.S.C. § 813, is a section of the United States Controlled Substances Act, allowing any chemical "substantially similar" to an illegal drug (in Schedule I or II) to be treated as if it were also in Schedule I or II, but only if it is intended for human consumption.

== See also ==
- 2-Fluoroamphetamine (2-FA)
- 3-Fluoroethamphetamine (3-FEA)
- 3-Fluoromethamphetamine (3-FMA)
- 3-Hydroxyamphetamine (Gepefrine)
- 3-Methylamphetamine (3-MA)
- 3-Methoxyamphetamine (3-MeOA)
- 3-Trifluoromethylamphetamine (Norfenfluramine)
- 4-Fluoroamphetamine (4-FA)
- 3,4-Difluoroamphetamine
