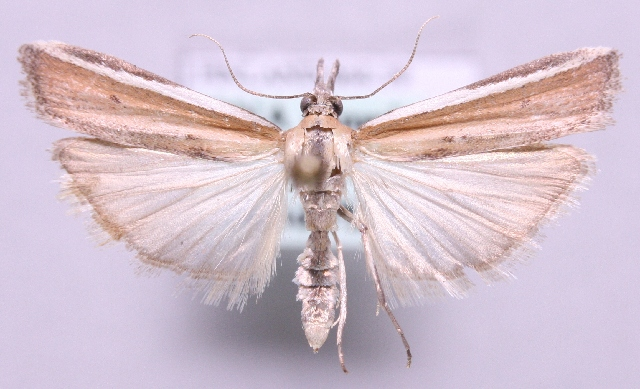
- Pima boisduvaliella

Scientific classification
- Domain: Eukaryota
- Kingdom: Animalia
- Phylum: Arthropoda
- Class: Insecta
- Order: Lepidoptera
- Family: Pyralidae
- Tribe: Phycitini
- Genus: Pima; Hulst, 1888

= Pima (moth) =

Genus of moths

Pima is a genus of snout moths described by George Duryea Hulst in 1888.

== Species ==
- Pima albiplagiatella (Packard, 1874)
- Pima albocostalialis (Hulst, 1886)
- Pima boisduvaliella Guenée, 1845
- Pima difficilis de Joannis, 1927
- Pima fergusoni Neunzig, 2003
- Pima flavidorsella de Joannis, 1927
- Pima fosterella Hulst, 1888
- Pima fulvirugella (Ragonot, 1887)
- Pima granitella (Ragonot, 1887)
- Pima occidentalis Heinrich, 1956
- Pima parkerella (Schaus, 1924)
