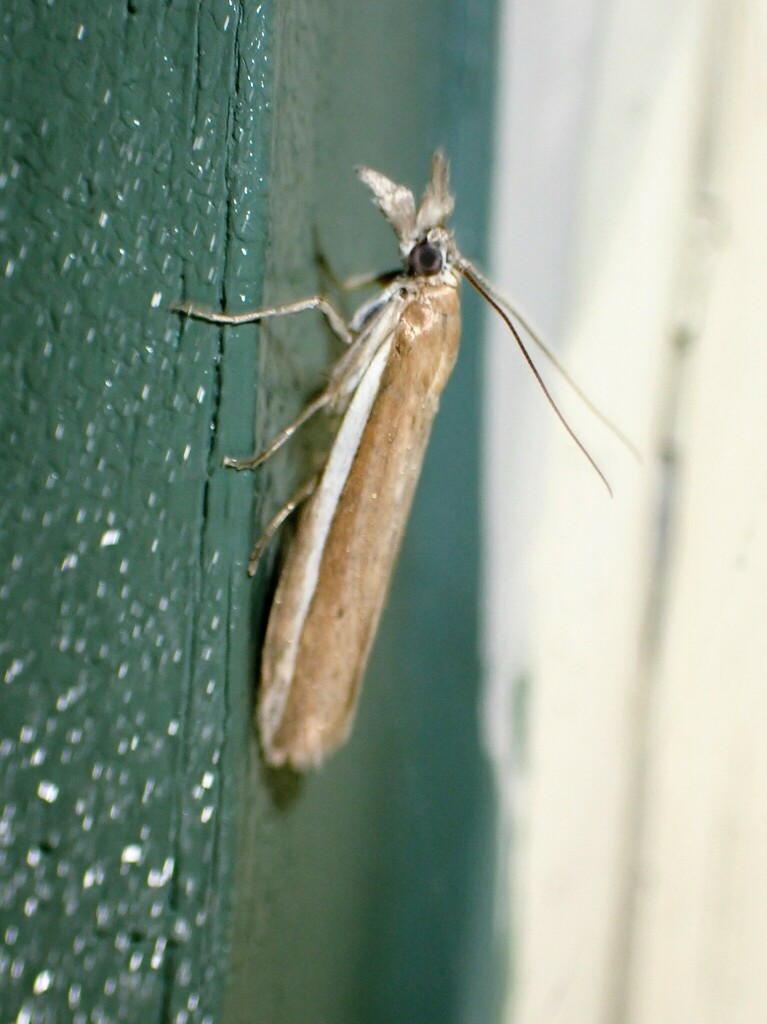

Scientific classification
- Kingdom: Animalia
- Phylum: Arthropoda
- Clade: Pancrustacea
- Class: Insecta
- Order: Lepidoptera
- Family: Pyralidae
- Genus: Pima
- Species: P. albiplagiatella

Binomial name
- Pima albiplagiatella (Packard, 1874)

Synonyms
- Myelois albiplagiatella Packard, 1874

= Pima albiplagiatella =

Species of moth

Pima albiplagiatella, the white-edged pima moth or beach pea borer, is a species of snout moth described by Alpheus Spring Packard in 1874. It is found in the south-western United States, as well as Colorado, Oregon, Washington, Manitoba, New York and Pennsylvania.

The wingspan is about 20 mm. There is one generation per year.

The larvae feed on Astragalus species, including Astragalus allochrous, Astragalus thurberi and Astragalus wootonii, as well as Lathyrus species.
