= 2-Chloro-2-phenylethylamine =

β-Chlorophenethylamine

Names
- IUPAC name 2-chloro-2-phenylethanamine
- Other names: β-Chlorophenylethylamine; 2'-Chlorophenethylamine

Identifiers
CAS Number	4633-92-5
3D model (JSmol)	Interactive image
ChemSpider	74986
PubChem CID	99095
- InChI: InChI=1S/C8H10ClN/c9-8(6-10)7-4-2-1-3-5-7/h1-5,8H,6,10H2 Key: IUAYUYABWKLCER-UHFFFAOYSA-N
- SMILES: C1=CC=C(C=C1)C(CN)Cl

Properties
Chemical formula	C_{8}H_{10}ClN
Molar mass	155.63 g·mol^{−1}
Density	1.106
- Except where otherwise noted, data are given for materials in their standard state (at 25 °C [77 °F], 100 kPa). Infobox references

2-Chloro-2-phenylethylamine, also known as β-chlorophenethylamine, is an irreversible inhibitor or suicidal inhibitor of the enzyme dopamine-beta-monooxygenase, a derivative of phenylethylamine in which the hydrogen atom in the β-position of the ethyl chain is replaced by a chlorine atom. This is a substituted phenylethylamine, does not exhibit pronounced psychoactivity.

It is a related compound to N,N-dimethyl-2-chloro-2-phenylethylamine (DMEA), a precursor in organic synthesis.

== Pharmacology ==
=== Inhibition of dopamine β-hydroxylase ===
2-Chloro-2-phenylethylamine is a suicide inhibitor of dopamine β-hydroxylase, which irreversibly inactivates them via covalent modification of the active site: a bound alpha-aminoacetophenone is formed, followed by an intramolecular redox reaction to form a ketone-derived radical cation as an inhibitory substance.

== See also ==
- N,N-Dimethyl-2-chloro-2-phenylethylamine
