= 2,4-Dichloroamphetamine =

Serotonergic neurotoxin

Clinical data
- Other names: 2,4-DCA
- Drug class: Psychostimulant; Serotonergic neurotoxin; Monoamine oxidase inhibitor

Identifiers
- IUPAC name: 1-(2,4-dichlorophenyl)propan-2-amine
- CAS Number: 32560-77-3
- PubChem CID: 3041175
- ChemSpider: 2304480

Chemical and physical data
- Formula: C_{9}H_{11}Cl_{2}N
- Molar mass: 204.09 g·mol^{−1}
- 3D model (JSmol): Interactive image
- SMILES: CC(CC1=C(C=C(C=C1)Cl)Cl)N
- InChI: InChI=1S/C9H11Cl2N/c1-6(12)4-7-2-3-8(10)5-9(7)11/h2-3,5-6H,4,12H2,1H3; Key:WFXOKSCQUWGEEH-UHFFFAOYSA-N

2,4-Dichloroamphetamine (2,4-DCA) is a psychostimulant of the amphetamine family and a potent serotonergic neurotoxin related to para-chloroamphetamine (PCA; 4-chloroamphetamine). It is also a potent monoamine oxidase inhibitor.

== See also ==
- 3-Chloroamphetamine (3-CA)
- 3,4-Dichloroamphetamine (3,4-DCA)
