= 6-CAT =

Chemical compound

Clinical data
- Routes of administration: Oral

Legal status
- Legal status: In general: uncontrolled

Identifiers
- IUPAC name: 6-Chloro-1,2,3,4-tetrahydronaphtalen-2-amine
- CAS Number: 60480-00-4
- PubChem CID: 16244336
- ChemSpider: 11269876
- CompTox Dashboard (EPA): DTXSID20585667

Chemical and physical data
- 3D model (JSmol): Interactive image
- SMILES: C1CC2=C(CC1N)C=CC(=C2)Cl
- InChI: InChI=1S/C10H12ClN/c11-9-3-1-8-6-10(12)4-2-7(8)5-9/h1,3,5,10H,2,4,6,12H2; Key:CJRJTCMSQLEPFQ-UHFFFAOYSA-N

6-Chloro-2-aminotetralin (6-CAT) is a drug which acts as a selective serotonin releasing agent (SSRA) and is a putative entactogen in humans. It is a rigid analogue of para-chloroamphetamine (PCA).

According to Nichols et al., 6-CAT is a non-neurotoxic analog of PCA.

Other related compounds that are creditworthy of mention include 6,7-DCAT & 5,6-DCAT [57915-89-6]. These compounds were invented by Bryan Molloy (the inventor of Prozac). These can be thought to be rigid analogs of 3,4-Dichloroamphetamine and might be predicted to be similarly non-neurotoxic. A positional isomer of the aforementioned two compounds is also known to exist in the literature with a 5,8-dichloro substitution pattern (PC9954388). The compound depicted in the latter case is with the spirodecanone pharmacophore.

It is worth pointing out that the precursor used in the synthesis of 6-CAT is called 6-Chloro-2-tetralone [17556-18-2]. This compound is actually the starting material in the synthesis of Bexlosteride.

== See also ==
- 2-Aminotetralin
