= 3-Chloroamphetamine =

Serotonergic neurotoxin

Clinical data
- Other names: 3-CA; meta-Chloroamphetamine; m-Chloroamphetamine; MCA; PAL-304; PAL304
- Drug class: Psychostimulant; Serotonergic neurotoxin
- ATC code: None

Identifiers
- IUPAC name: 1-(3-chlorophenyl)propan-2-amine
- CAS Number: 32560-59-1
- PubChem CID: 20027470
- ChemSpider: 14677942
- UNII: 8V8DE89CJE
- ChEMBL: ChEMBL149022
- CompTox Dashboard (EPA): DTXSID501043400

Chemical and physical data
- Formula: C_{9}H_{12}ClN
- Molar mass: 169.65 g·mol^{−1}
- 3D model (JSmol): Interactive image
- SMILES: CC(CC1=CC(=CC=C1)Cl)N
- InChI: InChI=1S/C9H12ClN/c1-7(11)5-8-3-2-4-9(10)6-8/h2-4,6-7H,5,11H2,1H3; Key:ORWQJKNRYUIFJU-UHFFFAOYSA-N

3-Chloroamphetamine (3-CA; code name PAL-304), also known as meta-chloroamphetamine (MCA), is a psychostimulant of the amphetamine family and a serotonergic neurotoxin related to para-chloroamphetamine (PCA; 4-chloroamphetamine).

The drug is a potent serotonin–norepinephrine–dopamine releasing agent (SNDRA). Its EC_{50} values for induction of monoamine release are 9.4 nM for norepinephrine, 11.8 nM for dopamine, and 120 nM for serotonin. Hence, 3-CA shows around 10-fold preference for induction of catecholamine release over induction of serotonin release.

3-CA produces the head-twitch response in rodents similarly to PCA.

3-CA is closely related to the potent serotonergic neurotoxin PCA. In contrast to PCA, 3-CA produced no serotonergic neurotoxicity in rodents. However, this was found to be due to rapid metabolism via para-hydroxylation. When the metabolism of 3-CA was inhibited, the drug produced approximately equivalent serotonergic neurotoxicity to PCA.

== See also ==
- 2,4-Dichloroamphetamine (2,4-DCA)
- 3,4-Dichloroamphetamine (3,4-DCA)
- 3-Chloromethamphetamine
- 3-Chlorocathinone
- 3-Chloromethcathinone
