= 3-Fluoromethamphetamine =

Stimulant designer drug

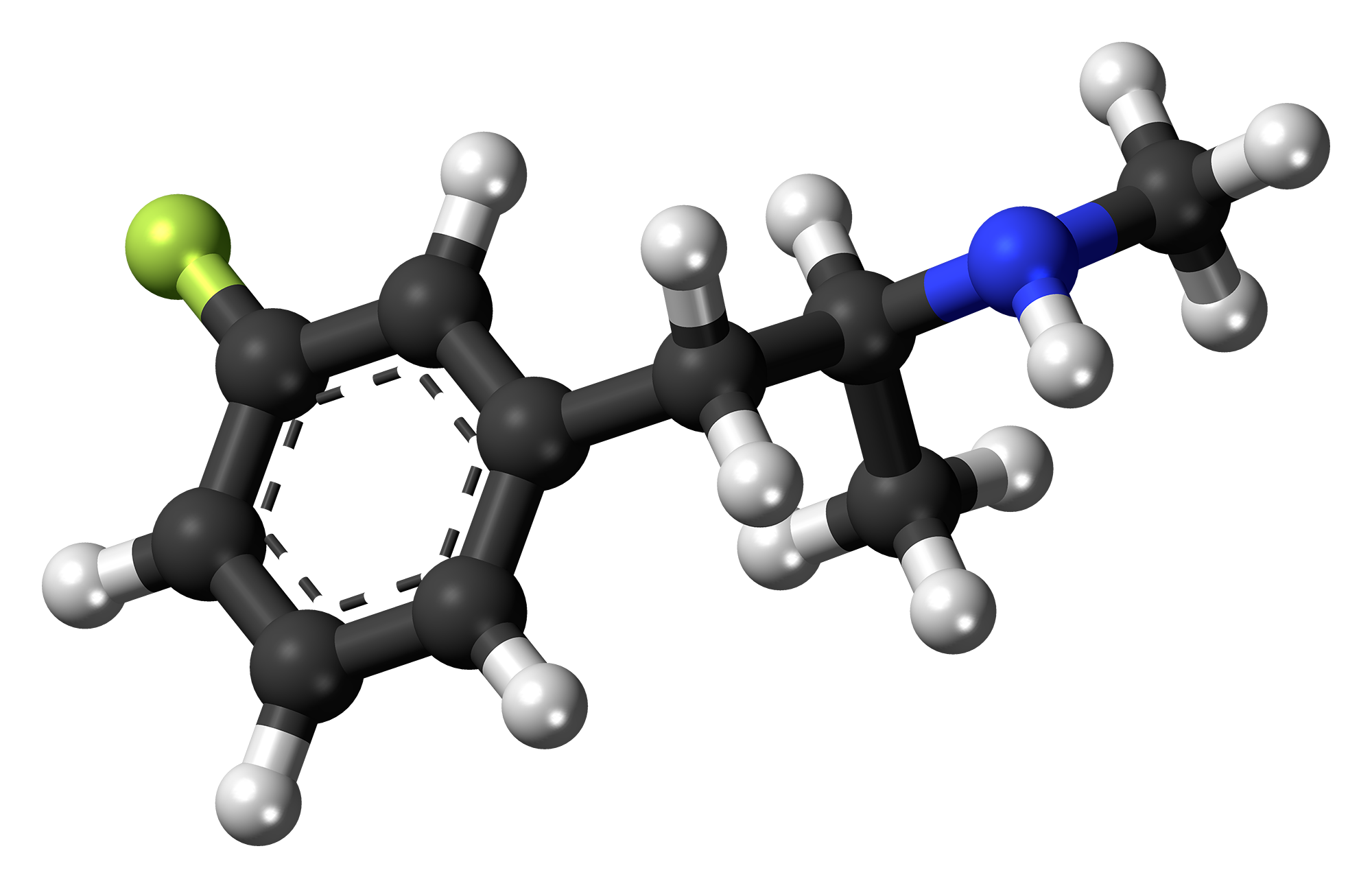

Legal status
- Legal status: CA: Schedule I; DE: Anlage I (Authorized scientific use only); UK: Class A; US: Unscheduled

Identifiers
- IUPAC name: (RS)-1-(3-fluorophenyl)-N-methylpropan-2-amine
- CAS Number: 1182818-14-9
- PubChem CID: 58216164
- ChemSpider: 27050449
- UNII: E5356E50BR
- CompTox Dashboard (EPA): DTXSID20728951

Chemical and physical data
- Formula: C_{10}H_{14}FN
- Molar mass: 167.227 g·mol^{−1}
- 3D model (JSmol): Interactive image
- SMILES: FC1=CC=CC(CC(NC)C)=C1
- InChI: InChI=1S/C10H14FN/c1-8(12-2)6-9-4-3-5-10(11)7-9/h3-5,7-8,12H,6H2,1-2H3; Key:RRVAUTPWWWFYQT-UHFFFAOYSA-N

3-Fluoromethamphetamine (3-FMA) is a stimulant drug related to methamphetamine and 3-fluoroamphetamine. It has been sold online as a designer drug.

== Legal status ==
=== Canada ===
As of 1996, 3-FMA is a controlled substance in Canada, due to being an analog of methamphetamine.

=== China ===
As of October 2015, 3-FMA is a controlled substance in China.

=== United States ===
As a close analog of scheduled controlled substance, sale or possession of 3-FMA could be potentially be prosecuted under the Federal Analogue Act.

== See also ==
- 2-Fluoroamphetamine
- 2-Fluoromethamphetamine
- 3-Fluoroamphetamine
- 3-Fluoroethamphetamine
- 3-Fluoromethcathinone
- 4-Fluoroamphetamine
- 4-Fluoromethamphetamine
- 3-Chloromethamphetamine
