= Aziridinium =

Ionic form of aziridines

Names
- IUPAC name aziridin-1-ium

Identifiers
CAS Number	91127-35-4
3D model (JSmol)	Interactive image
ChEBI	CHEBI:50929
ChemSpider	10422370
Gmelin Reference	322803
PubChem CID	23266392
CompTox Dashboard (EPA)	DTXSID80756997
- InChI: InChI=1S/C2H5N/c1-2-3-1/h3H,1-2H2/p+1 Key: NOWKCMXCCJGMRR-UHFFFAOYSA-O
- SMILES: C1C[NH2+]1

Properties
Chemical formula	C_{2}H_{6}N^{+}
Molar mass	44.076 g·mol^{−1}
- Except where otherwise noted, data are given for materials in their standard state (at 25 °C [77 °F], 100 kPa). Infobox references

Aziridiniums are the ionic form of the class of molecules known as aziridines.

Aziridines can be used to insert nitrogen atoms during synthesis, but without any substituents attached to the nitrogen in the ring, they are considered nonactivated and inert. They can be rendered active by the preparation of aziridinium ions. The creation of this ionic species imparts a 47 kJ/mol ring strain increase.

Thus, aziridiniums render nonactivated aziridines reactive, making them feasible to use in chemical synthesis. Although serving many synthetic purposes, aziridiniums served as key reagents that were used for the production of nitrogen mustard, a chemical warfare agent.
