= 2-Fluoromethamphetamine =

Stimulant designer drug

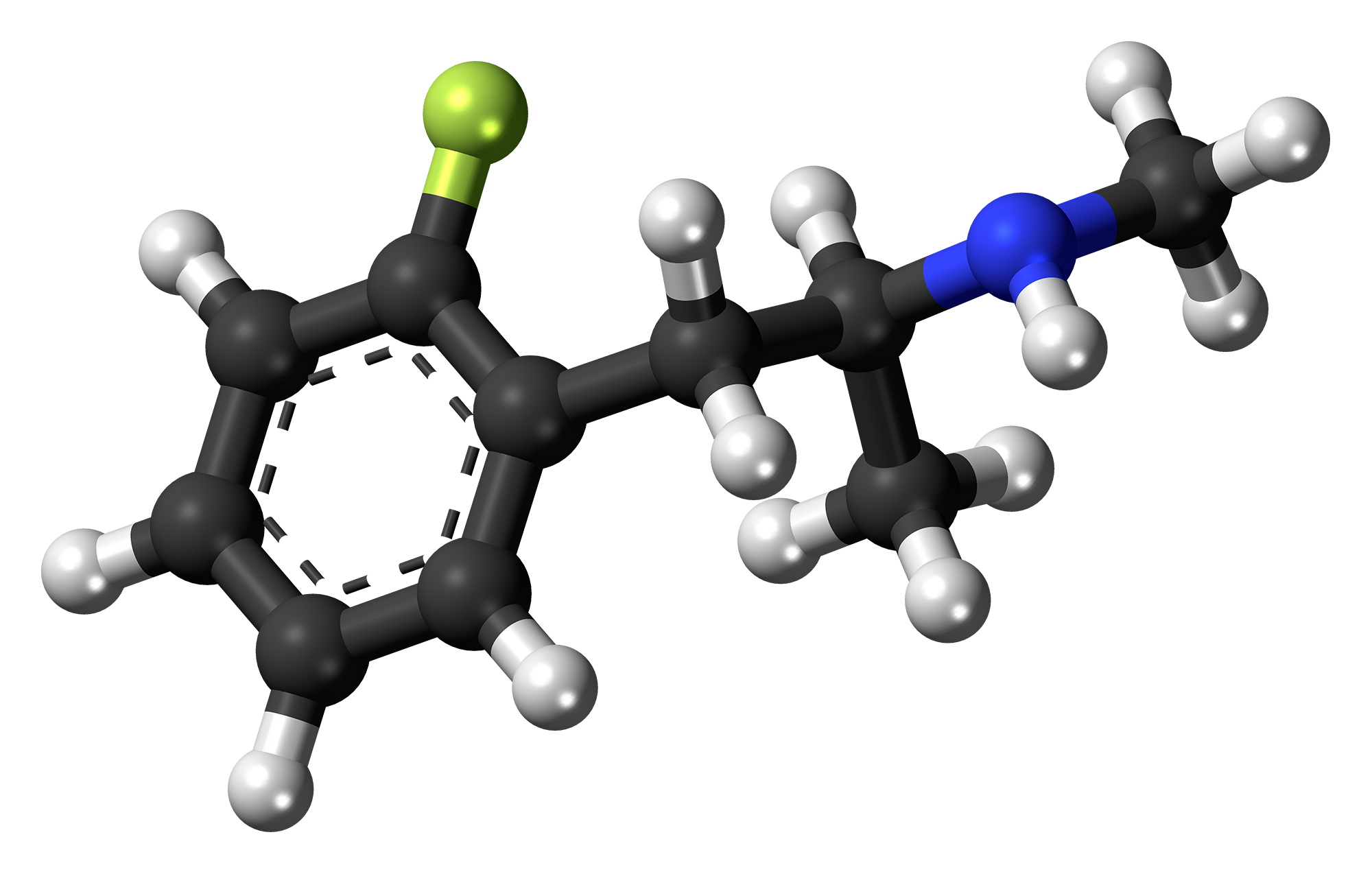

Clinical data
- Routes of administration: By mouth
- Drug class: Stimulant

Legal status
- Legal status: CA: Schedule I; DE: Anlage I (Authorized scientific use only); UK: Class A; US: Unscheduled

Identifiers
- IUPAC name: (RS)-1-(2-Fluorophenyl)-N-methylpropan-2-amine
- CAS Number: 1017176-48-5
- PubChem CID: 24257263
- ChemSpider: 23900072
- UNII: YV5793W75P
- CompTox Dashboard (EPA): DTXSID90640530

Chemical and physical data
- Formula: C_{10}H_{14}FN
- Molar mass: 167.227 g·mol^{−1}
- 3D model (JSmol): Interactive image
- SMILES: CC(CC1=CC=CC=C1F)NC
- InChI: InChI=1S/C10H14FN/c1-8(12-2)7-9-5-3-4-6-10(9)11/h3-6,8,12H,7H2,1-2H3; Key:XNWIKJYFOIDUGD-UHFFFAOYSA-N

2-Fluoromethamphetamine (2-FMA) is a stimulant drug of the amphetamine family which has been used as a designer drug. 2-FMA is commonly compared to lisdexamfetamine (Vyvanse), and dextroamphetamine due to its efficacy as a study or productivity aid. 2-FMA is purported to produce somewhat less euphoria than comparable amphetamines, likely due to its main mechanism of action consisting of norepinephrine reuptake inhibition.

== Chemistry ==
2-Fluoromethamphetamine is fluorinated analogue of methamphetamine, and is a regioisomer of 3-FMA and 4-FMA.

It does not activate the serotonin receptors, including 5-HT_{2A}, unlike most stimulant drugs of the amphetamine family.

== Legal status ==
=== Canada ===
As of 1996, 2-FMA is a controlled substance in Canada, due to being an analog of methamphetamine.

=== China ===
As of October 2015, 2-FMA is a controlled substance in China.

=== Germany ===
As of 13 December 2014, 2-FMA is a controlled substance in Germany. It is controlled under Anlage I BtMG (Narcotics Act, Schedule I). Substances controlled under Anlage I BtMG are illegal to manufacture, possess, import, export, buy, sell, procure or dispense without a license. Violations of the law are punishable by a fine or imprisonment for up to five years.

=== Ukraine ===
As of July 2019, 2-FMA is a controlled substance in Ukraine (considered a narcotic).

=== United States ===
As a close analog of a scheduled controlled substance, sale or possession of 2-FMA could be potentially prosecuted under the Federal Analogue Act.

== See also ==
- Substituted amphetamine
- 2-Fluoroamphetamine
- 2-Fluoromethcathinone
- 3-Fluoromethamphetamine
- 3-Fluoroethamphetamine
- 4-Fluoromethamphetamine
- 4-Fluoroamphetamine
- 2-Methoxymethamphetamine (methoxyphenamine)
- 2F-MAR
- Borax combo
