= 3,4-Dichloroamphetamine =

Chemical compound

Clinical data
- Other names: 3,4-DCA
- ATC code: none

Identifiers
- IUPAC name: 1-(3,4-dichlorophenyl)propan-2-amine
- CAS Number: 4806-87-5
- PubChem CID: 17535
- ChemSpider: 16580
- UNII: 4Q81NBO3IA
- ChEMBL: ChEMBL48888
- CompTox Dashboard (EPA): DTXSID30896913
- ECHA InfoCard: 100.023.060

Chemical and physical data
- Formula: C_{9}H_{11}Cl_{2}N
- Molar mass: 204.09 g·mol^{−1}
- 3D model (JSmol): Interactive image
- SMILES: Clc1ccc(CC(N)C)cc1Cl
- InChI: InChI=1S/C9H11Cl2N/c1-6(12)4-7-2-3-8(10)9(11)5-7/h2-3,5-6H,4,12H2,1H3; Key:PUFDZMUCDFIRQY-UHFFFAOYSA-N

3,4-Dichloroamphetamine (3,4-DCA), is an amphetamine derived drug invented by Eli Lilly in the 1960s, which has a number of pharmacological actions. It acts as a highly potent and selective serotonin releasing agent (SSRA) and binds to the serotonin transporter with high affinity, but also acts as a selective serotonergic neurotoxin in a similar manner to the related para-chloroamphetamine (PCA), though with slightly lower potency. It is also a monoamine oxidase inhibitor (MAOI), as well as a very potent inhibitor of the enzyme phenylethanolamine N-methyl transferase which normally functions to transform noradrenaline into adrenaline in the body.

== Chemistry ==
=== Synthesis ===
Patent: Alternate proc (prep 12):

The reaction of 3,4-dichlorobenzyl chloride (1) with cyanide anion gives 3,4-dichlorophenylacetonitrile (2). Reaction with sodium methoxide and ethyl acetate gives α-acetoxy-3,4-dichlorophenylacetonitrile, (3). Removal of the nitrile group in the presence of sulfuric acid gives 3,4-dichlorophenylacetone (4). Oxime formation with hydroxylamine gives N-[1-(3,4-dichlorophenyl)propan-2-ylidene]hydroxylamine, (5). Reduction of the oxime completed the synthesis of 3,4-dichloroamphetamine (6).

For the supposedly non-neurotoxic 5,6-DCAT & 6,7-DCAT see under 6-CAT.

== See also ==
- 2,4-Dichloroamphetamine
- 3-Chloroamphetamine
- 3-Methoxy-4-methylamphetamine
- Cendifensine
- Cericlamine
- Chlorphentermine
- Clortermine
- Etolorex
- 3,4-Methylenedioxyamphetamine
- para-Chloroamphetamine
- para-Methoxyamphetamine
