= Para-Iodoamphetamine =

Chemical compound

para-Iodoamphetamine

Clinical data
- Other names: PIA; 4-Iodoamphetamine; 4-IA
- Drug class: Serotonin releasing agent; Serotonergic neurotoxin

Identifiers
- IUPAC name: 1-(4-iodophenyl)propan-2-amine
- CAS Number: 21894-72-4
- PubChem CID: 123870
- ChemSpider: 110407
- UNII: C4UL3HTE7T
- CompTox Dashboard (EPA): DTXSID20897232

Chemical and physical data
- Formula: C_{9}H_{12}IN
- Molar mass: 261.106 g·mol^{−1}
- 3D model (JSmol): Interactive image
- SMILES: CC(CC1=CC=C(C=C1)I)N
- InChI: InChI=1S/C9H12IN/c1-7(11)6-8-2-4-9(10)5-3-8/h2-5,7H,6,11H2,1H3; Key:VZPKOWYCGWOYRF-UHFFFAOYSA-N

para-Iodoamphetamine (PIA), also known as 4-iodoamphetamine (4-IA), is a monoamine releasing agent (MRA) and serotonergic neurotoxin of the amphetamine family related to para-chloroamphetamine (PCA).

== Pharmacology ==
=== Pharmacodynamics ===
PIA acts as a serotonin releasing agent (SRA). In animal drug discrimination tests, PIA fully substitutes for MDMA and (+)-MBDB.

It also has very low affinity for certain serotonin receptors, including the serotonin 5-HT_{1} receptor (K_{i} = 7,660 nM) and the serotonin 5-HT_{2} receptor (K_{i} = 43,000 nM).

PIA has been described as having either similar serotonergic neurotoxicity as PCA or as having much weaker serotonergic neurotoxicity than PCA.

== Chemistry ==
PIA, also known as 4-iodoamphetamine, is a phenethylamine and amphetamine derivative and a para-halogenated amphetamine.

=== Analogues ===
PIA is closely related to other para-halogenated amphetamines such as PCA, para-bromoamphetamine (PBA), and para-fluoroamphetamine (PFA).

Iofetamine, also known as N-isopropyl-(^{123}I)-para-iodoamphetamine, is a derivative of PIA used as a radiopharmaceutical and diagnostic agent.

5-Iodo-2-aminoindane (5-IAI), the 2-aminoindane analogue of PIA, was an attempt to make a non-neurotoxic analogue of PIA that proved to be less neurotoxic.
