= 4-Fluoromethamphetamine =

Stimulant designer drug

4-FMA

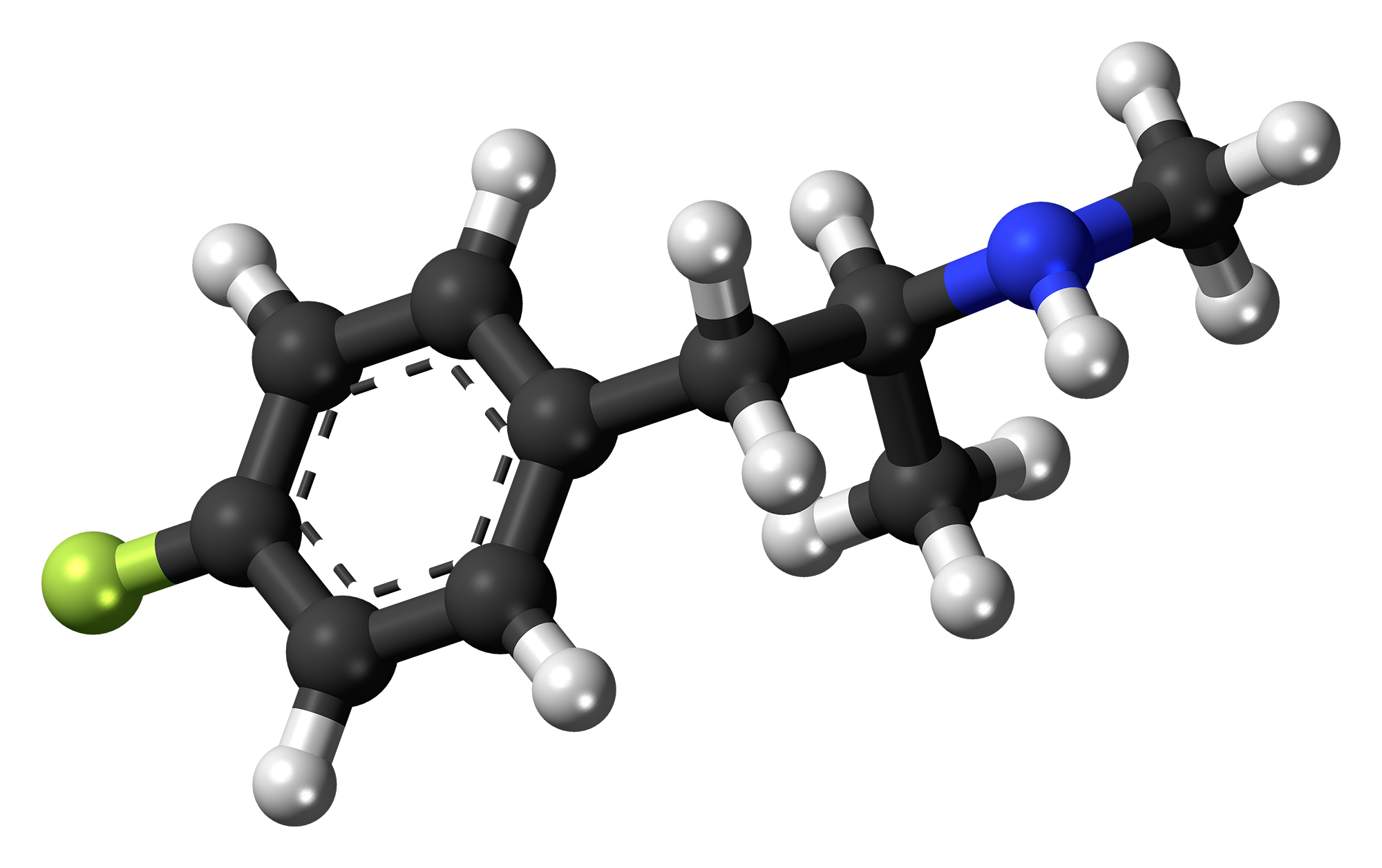

Clinical data
- Drug class: Stimulant; Monoamine releasing agent

Legal status
- Legal status: AU: S9 (Prohibited substance); CA: Schedule I; DE: Anlage II (Authorized trade only, not prescriptible); UK: Class A; US: Unscheduled

Identifiers
- IUPAC name: (RS)-1-(4-fluorophenyl)-N-methylpropan-2-amine
- CAS Number: 351-03-1 52063-62-4 (hydrochloride)
- PubChem CID: 11745017
- ChemSpider: 9919721
- UNII: 8LLF59DO7F
- CompTox Dashboard (EPA): DTXSID101043365 DTXSID60874103, DTXSID101043365
- ECHA InfoCard: 100.254.220

Chemical and physical data
- Formula: C_{10}H_{14}FN
- Molar mass: 167.227 g·mol^{−1}
- 3D model (JSmol): Interactive image
- SMILES: Fc1ccc(cc1)CC(NC)C
- InChI: InChI=1S/C10H14FN/c1-8(12-2)7-9-3-5-10(11)6-4-9/h3-6,8,12H,7H2,1-2H3; Key:YCWZPIHKUYZTFM-UHFFFAOYSA-N

4-Fluoromethamphetamine (4-FMA) is a stimulant drug related to methamphetamine and 4-fluoroamphetamine. It has been reported to be sold as a designer drug, but little is known about its pharmacology or toxicology.

It was first detected from legal highs sold in Japan in 2006 and became illegal to sell or to possess for the purpose of distribution (although not to simply possess for personal use) in Japan in 2008. It was initially reported to be contained as an ingredient in some of the range of party pills sold internationally by the Israeli company Neorganics from around 2006 onwards, but this was later shown to be incorrect and this ingredient was eventually identified as the closely related compound 2-fluoromethamphetamine.

== Pharmacology ==
4-FMA is a CYP450 inhibitor. It reduces the metabolism of methamphetamine, which has the effect of increasing its potency, duration and systemic toxicity while also reducing its cellular toxicity.

== Legal status ==
=== Australia ===
4-FMA is considered a Schedule 9 substance in Australia under the Poisons Standard (October 2015). A Schedule 9 substance is a substance which may be abused or misused, the manufacture, possession, sale or use of which should be prohibited by law except when required for medical or scientific research, or for analytical, teaching or training purposes with approval of Commonwealth and/or State or Territory Health Authorities.

=== Canada ===
As of 1996, 4-FMA is a controlled substance in Canada, due to being an analog of methamphetamine.

=== China ===
As of October 2015 4-FMA is a controlled substance in China.

=== Finland ===
Scheduled in the "government decree on narcotic substances, preparations and plants" and is therefore illegal.

=== United States ===
As a close analog of scheduled controlled substance, sale or possession of 4-FMA could be potentially be prosecuted under the Federal Analogue Act if intended for human consumption.

== See also ==
- 2-Fluoromethamphetamine (2-FMA)
- 3-Fluoromethamphetamine (3-FMA)
- 3-Fluoroethamphetamine (3-FEA)
- 4-Bromomethamphetamine (4-BMA)
- 4-Chloromethamphetamine (4-CMA)
- 4-Fluoroamphetamine (4-FA)
- 4-Fluoromethcathinone (4-FMC)
- 4-Methylmethamphetamine (4-MMA)
- 4-Methoxymethamphetamine (PMMA)
- Fenisorex
