= 2-Fluoroamphetamine =

Stimulant designer drug

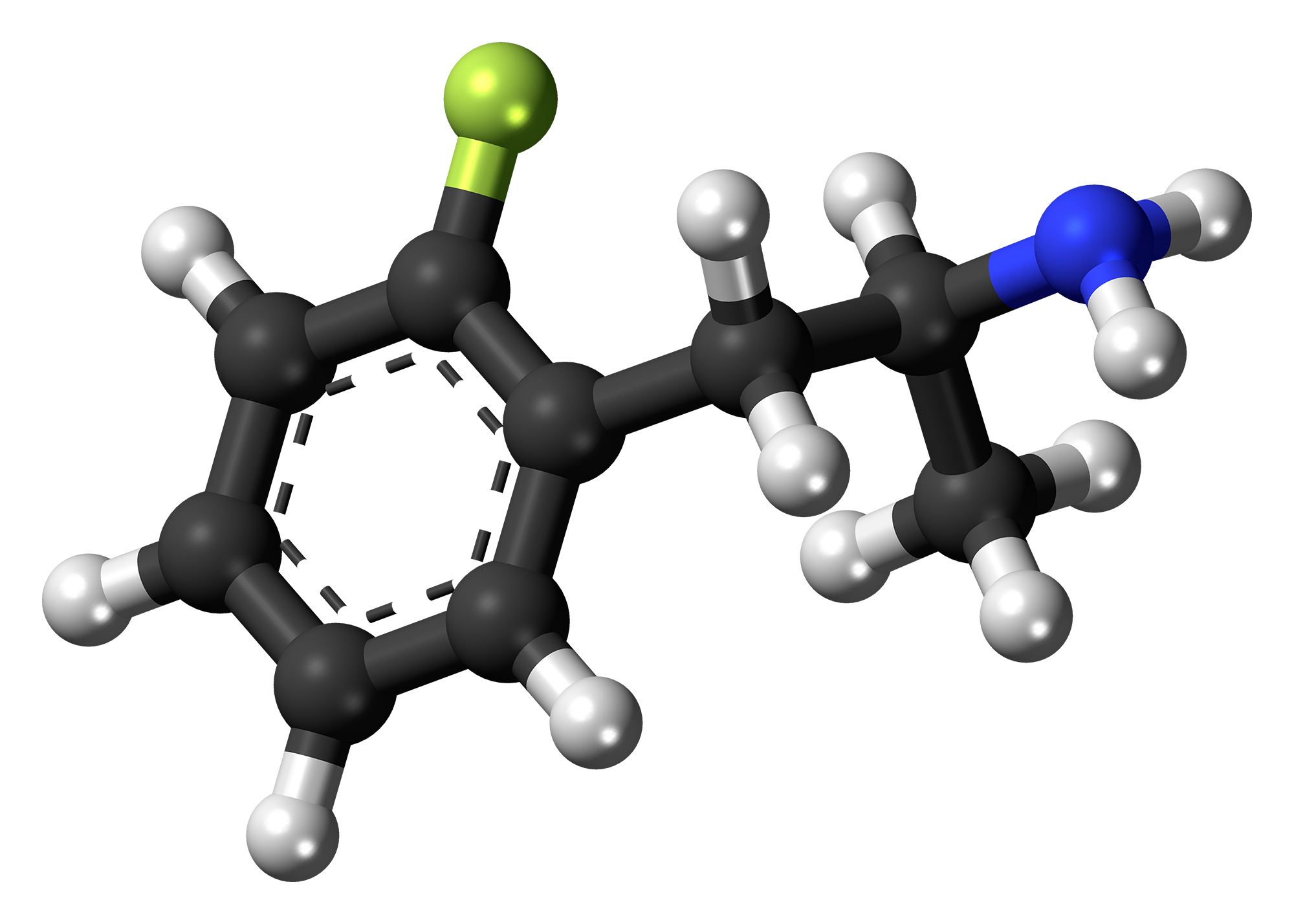

Legal status
- Legal status: CA: Schedule I; DE: NpSG (Industrial and scientific use only); UK: Class A

Identifiers
- IUPAC name: 1-(2-Fluorophenyl)propan-2-amine
- CAS Number: 1716-60-5
- PubChem CID: 121531
- ChemSpider: 108441
- UNII: V8Q7K3989D
- CompTox Dashboard (EPA): DTXSID30938009

Chemical and physical data
- Formula: C_{9}H_{12}FN
- Molar mass: 153.200 g·mol^{−1}
- 3D model (JSmol): Interactive image
- SMILES: CC(CC1=CC=CC=C1F)N
- InChI: InChI=1S/C9H12FN/c1-7(11)6-8-4-2-3-5-9(8)10/h2-5,7H,6,11H2,1H3; Key:GDSXNLDTQFFIEU-UHFFFAOYSA-N

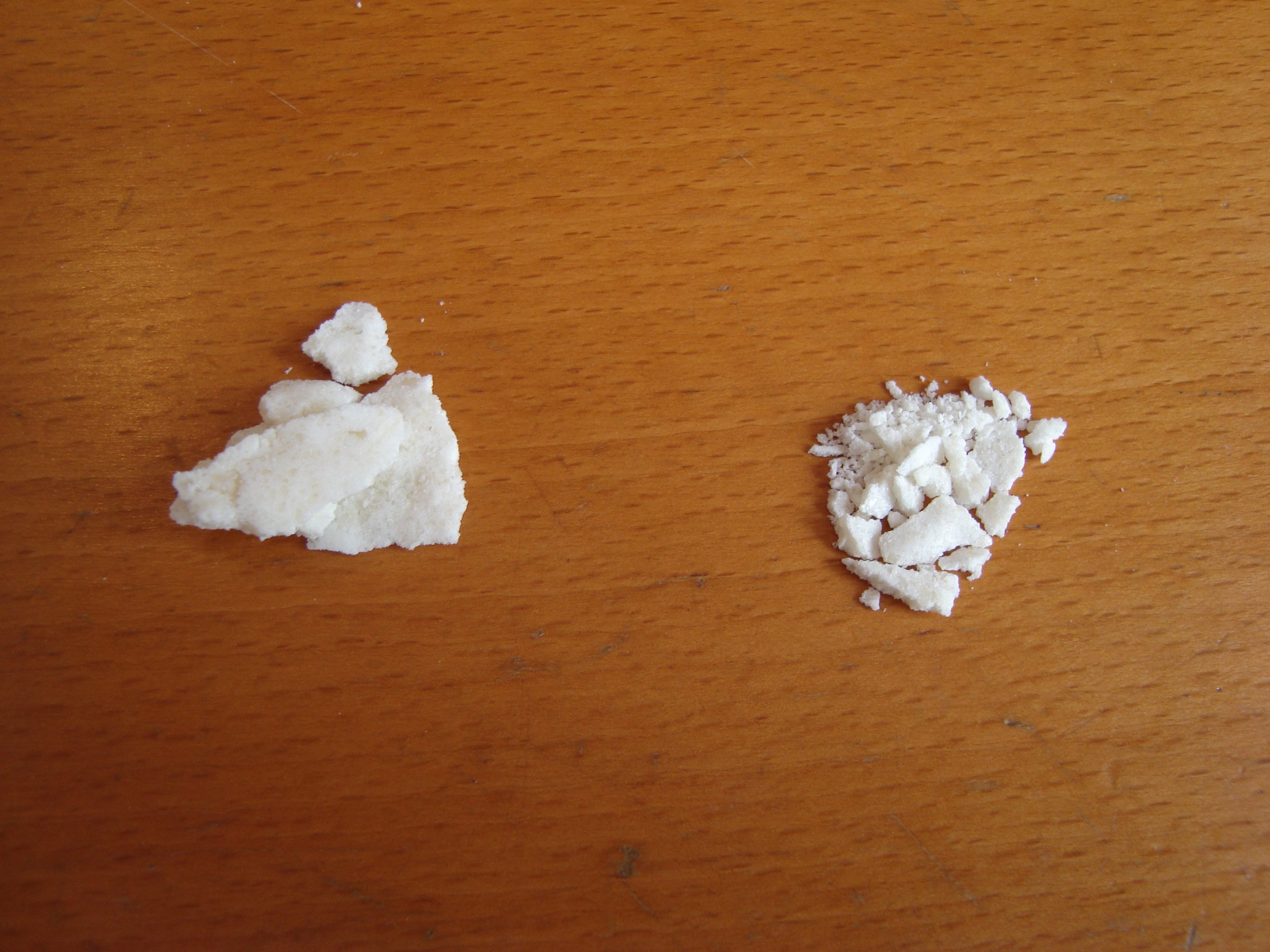
1 gram of 2-FA

2-Fluoroamphetamine (2-FA) is a stimulant drug from the amphetamine family which has been sold as a designer drug. 2-Fluoroamphetamine differs from 3-fluoroamphetamine and 4-fluoroamphetamine in the position of the fluorine atom on the aromatic ring, making them positional isomers of one another. The replacement of a hydrogen atom with a fluorine atom in certain compounds to facilitate passage through the blood–brain barrier, as is desirable in central nervous system pharmaceutical agents, is a common practice due to the corresponding increase in lipophilicity granted by this substitution.

== Pharmacology ==
Anorexiant dose (amount inhibiting food intake by 50% for 2 hours, given 1 hour earlier) = 15 mg/kg (rat; p.o.).

Analgesic dose (50% inhibition of response to tail-clamp) = 20 mg/kg (mouse; i.p.).

Effect on blood pressure: 0.5 mg/kg (rat; i.v.) produces an increase in BP of 29 mm.

== Toxicology ==
LD_{50} (mouse; i.p.) = 100 mg/kg.

== Legal status ==
=== United States ===
The Federal Analogue Act, 21 U.S.C. § 813, is a section of the United States Controlled Substances Act, allowing any chemical "substantially similar" to an illegal drug (in Schedule I or II) to be treated as if it were also in Schedule I or II, but only if it is intended (ref 1) for human consumption. 2-FA may be considered to be an analog of amphetamine, thus falling under the Federal Analog Act, if, as stated above, it is intended for human consumption.

=== China ===
As of October 2015 2-FA is a controlled substance in China.

=== Finland ===
Scheduled in the "government decree on substances, preparations and plants considered to be narcotic drugs" and is hence illegal.

== See also ==
- 2-Fluoromethamphetamine
- 2-Methylamphetamine (2-MA)
- 2-Methoxymethamphetamine (methoxyphenamine)
