= Para-Chloroamphetamine =

Chemical compound

para-Chloroamphetamine

Clinical data
- Other names: PCA; pCA; p-Chloroamphetamine; 4-Chloroamphetamine; 4-CA; Ro 4-6614/001; NSC-287208; 4-Chloro-α-methylphenethylamine; 1-(4-Chlorophenyl)propan-2-amine
- Routes of administration: Oral
- Drug class: Serotonin–norepinephrine–dopamine releasing agent; Serotonergic neurotoxin; Antidepressant; Stimulant

Legal status
- Legal status: DE: NpSG (Industrial and scientific use only); UK: Class A

Pharmacokinetic data
- Duration of action: IM: 3–7 hours

Identifiers
- IUPAC name: 1-(4-Chlorophenyl)propan-2-amine
- CAS Number: 64-12-0
- PubChem CID: 3127
- IUPHAR/BPS: 4592
- ChemSpider: 3015
- UNII: 897NVD4A52
- ChEMBL: ChEMBL358967
- CompTox Dashboard (EPA): DTXSID90897229

Chemical and physical data
- Formula: C_{9}H_{12}ClN
- Molar mass: 169.65 g·mol^{−1}
- 3D model (JSmol): Interactive image
- SMILES: Clc1ccc(cc1)CC(N)C
- InChI: InChI=1S/C9H12ClN/c1-7(11)6-8-2-4-9(10)5-3-8/h2-5,7H,6,11H2,1H3; Key:WWPITPSIWMXDPE-UHFFFAOYSA-N

para-Chloroamphetamine (PCA), also known as 4-chloroamphetamine (4-CA), is a serotonin–norepinephrine–dopamine releasing agent (SNDRA) and serotonergic neurotoxin of the amphetamine family. It is used in scientific research in the study of the serotonin system, as a serotonin releasing agent (SRA) at lower doses to produce serotonergic effects, and as a serotonergic neurotoxin at higher doses to produce long-lasting depletions of serotonin.

PCA has also been clinically studied as an appetite suppressant and antidepressant, but findings of neurotoxicity in animals discouraged further evaluation. It has also been encountered as a designer drug, although it never achieved popularity, again perhaps due to its neurotoxicity.

== Use and effects ==
PCA was studied clinically as an appetite suppressant and antidepressant and its effects in these studies were described. It has been said to have only slight stimulant effects and to behave more like an antidepressant than a stimulant. At doses of 80 to 90 mg daily, in 3 doses, it produced no significant acute psychoactive effects and produced few adverse effects. However, sleep disturbances and nausea were mentioned. No hallucinogenic effects have been reported.

The profile of PCA is analogous to that of naphthylaminopropane (NAP; PAL-287), a highly potent and well-balanced SNDRA with only weak stimulant-like effects. It is thought that concomitant robust serotonin release suppresses the stimulating and rewarding effects of dopamine release.

== Pharmacology ==
=== Monoamine releasing agent ===
PCA acts as a serotonin, norepinephrine, and dopamine releasing agent (SNDRA). Its EC_{50} values for monoamine release are 28.3 nM for serotonin, 23.5 to 26.2 nM for norepinephrine, and 42.2 to 68.5 nM for dopamine in rat brain synaptosomes, making it a potent and well-balanced SNDRA. It is also a serotonin–norepinephrine–dopamine reuptake inhibitor (SNDRI), with IC_{50} values of 490 nM for serotonin, 320 nM for norepinephrine, and 3,600 nM for dopamine in human embryonic kidney 293 (HEK293) cells.

==== Short-term effects ====
In animals, doses of PCA of 0.5 to 5 mg/kg acutely produce a variety of behavioral and neurochemical effects thought to be due to serotonin release. Consequent enhancement of serotonergic signaling, serotonergic effects like myoclonus, the serotonin behavioral syndrome, including tremor, rigidity, Straub tail, hindlimb abduction, lateral head weaving, and reciprocal forepaw treading, inhibition of startle response sensitization, suppression of sexual behavior in females, and the head-twitch response. Non-behavioral or physiological effects include activation of the hypothalamic–pituitary–adrenal axis (HPA axis), increased prolactin secretion, and increased plasma renin activity. In addition, it increases oxytocin levels. PCA and other SRAs like MDMA and α-ethyltryptamine (αET) produce locomotor hyperactivity in animals and this is thought to be serotonin-dependent. It is mimicked by serotonin 5-HT_{1B} receptor activation. However, PCA is also reported to produce amphetamine-like hyperactivity and stereotypy, as well as amphetamine-like enhancement of conditioned avoidance responding that is independent of serotonergic signaling.

PCA does not show effects like those of the selective norepinephrine and dopamine releasing agent (NDRA) amphetamine in animals but instead fully substitutes for other serotonin releasing agents like (+)-MBDB and MMAI in rodent drug discrimination tests. The findings with PCA are in contrast to those with para-fluoroamphetamine (PFA), which acts as a selective NDRA similarly to amphetamine, fully substitutes for amphetamine in animals, and fails to substitute for (+)-MBDB or MMAI. As touched on, PCA can robustly produce the head-twitch response, which is a behavioral proxy of psychedelic-like effects. However, PCA does not seem to produce hallucinogenic effects in humans, and hence its activity in the head-twitch paradigm has been described as a false-positive for psychedelic effects. The head-twitch response with PCA appears to be dependent on induction of serotonin release and not on direct serotonin receptor agonism by PCA, as it is blocked by destruction of presynaptic serotonergic nerve terminals or by serotonin synthesis inhibition. Relatedly, PCA is said not to be a serotonin 5-HT_{2A} receptor agonist (at concentrations up to 10,000 nM). However, PCA might nonetheless act as a direct serotonin 5-HT_{2} receptor agonist at high doses, as head twitches induced by it are not blocked by serotonin synthesis inhibition at these doses. Although PCA has been reported to produce the head-twitch response, a more modern study reported that it did not do so, at least unless the serotonin transporter (SERT) was artificially expressed in a population of medial prefrontal cortex (mPFC) serotonergic neurons that normally lack the SERT.

While extracellular serotonin levels and serotonergic signaling are acutely increased by PCA, there is a concomitant depletion of serotonin stores. The depletion includes a decrease in total serotonin content, 5-hydroxyindoleacetic acid (5-HIAA) content, and tryptophan hydroxylase activity. The acute depletion of serotonin stores by PCA is likely due to inhibition of tryptophan hydroxylase. How this occurs is unclear, as PCA does not inhibit tryptophan hydroxylase in vitro except at very high concentrations. The initial serotonin depletion by lower doses of PCA are not permanent and can readily reverse after a few hours. As such, low doses of PCA, such as 2 mg/kg, are regarded as non-neurotoxic. The dopaminergic and noradrenergic systems are also substantially impacted by acute PCA. However, dopamine and norepinephrine levels are only slightly changed. In addition, the effects on the dopaminergic and noradrenergic systems are of relatively short duration and return to normal within 24 hours, analogously to the case of the serotonin system. In line with the preceding neurochemical findings, tolerance to various of the behavioral effects of acute PCA has been found to develop.

Due to its activity as a serotonin releasing agent, PCA is employed in scientific research to acutely enhance and study serotonin signaling.

==== Long-term serotonergic neurotoxicity ====
At higher doses (e.g., 10 mg/kg) and for longer periods of exposure in animals, PCA produces extremely long-lasting depletion of serotonin and loss of serotonergic function that is considered to reflect serotonergic neurotoxicity. This includes depletion of serotonin content, 5-HIAA content, serotonin turnover, tryptophan hydroxylase, serotonin reuptake capacity, and serotonin transporters for weeks or months. As an example, brain serotonin continued to be reduced by 41% after 38 days. In addition, many serotonin-containing nerve fibers become undetectable and appear to be lost. There have also been observations of nerve degeneration in the days after PCA administration. Different serotonergic areas and projections are differentially susceptible to the neurotoxicity of PCA, with the dorsal raphe nuclei more susceptible and the median raphe nuclei, raphe obscurus, raphe pallidus, dentate gyrus, hypothalamus, and spinal cord all resistant. PCA is selective for serotonin, without causing depletion of norepinephrine or dopamine.

There are behavioral consequences of the serotonergic neurotoxicity of PCA. Affected animals are still quite normal in overall appearance. However, hypoactivity, increased defecation in the open field test, and failed acquisition of shock avoidance in the Y-maze task are all apparent. In addition, increased locomotion in response to the dopamine agonist apomorphine has been observed, which is consistent with findings that serotonin may inhibit certain aspects of dopamine signaling. Failure of acquisition of a two-way conditioned avoidance response has been observed, and this could be completely prevented with the SRI zimelidine (see more on this below). Various other changes and deficits have been seen as well. The effects of the non-selective serotonin receptor agonist and serotonergic psychedelic 5-MeO-DMT have been found to be greatly potentiated following PCA, which may reflect receptor supersensitivity in an attempt at compensation for serotonin depletion. Conversely, the behavioral and physiological serotonergic effects of acute low-dose PCA challenge are attenuated after high-dose neurotoxic PCA exposure, which may reflect reduced available serotonin stores for release.

===== Mechanisms of neurotoxicity =====
Although the ultimate cause is cytotoxicity to serotonergic neurons, the mechanisms leading to the serotonergic neurotoxicity of PCA are unknown. However, uptake of PCA into neurons by the serotonin transporter (SERT) appears to be required. Serotonin reuptake inhibitors (SRIs) like fluoxetine can block both the acute short-term effects and the long-term serotonergic neurotoxicity of PCA. In addition, they can be given 4 hours after PCA administration, when acute serotonin depletion has already occurred, and will still completely protect against the long-term neurotoxicity. However, the SRI must be long-lasting; the short-acting SRI clomipramine, given before PCA, prevented acute serotonin depletion, but PCA outlasted clomipramine in the body, and the same degree of long-term neurotoxicity occurred as if clomipramine had not been administered.

It has been theorized that a toxic metabolite of PCA may be formed and that this metabolite is responsible for its neurotoxicity. However, no compelling evidence in support of this hypothesis has emerged. Severe depletion of serotonin by the combination of para-chlorophenylalanine (PCPA) and reserpine substantially protects against the serotonergic neurotoxicity of PCA. This might be due to serotonin forming neurotoxic metabolites, for instance 5,6-dihydroxytryptamine (5,6-DHT), in the context of PCA's actions. Similarly to prophylactic serotonin depletion, α-methyl-p-tyrosine, which depletes dopamine, protects against the serotonergic neurotoxicity of PCA as well. It thus appears that dopamine is involved in the neurotoxicity of PCA, which is notable as PCA is a potent dopamine releasing agent in addition to inducing the release of serotonin.

It has been reported that direct intracerebroventricular injection of PCA into the brain, in contrast to peripheral administration, failed to produce serotonergic neurotoxicity. This was the case even with continuous infusion for two days. This seems like it may lend credence to the toxic metabolite theory of PCA neurotoxicity, as a peripherally formed metabolite of PCA might be required for neurotoxicity to occur. However, no toxic metabolite has still yet been identified and no other support for the hypothesis has surfaced. Inhibiting the metabolism of PCA does not reduce tryptophan hydroxylase inactivation, suggesting that a metabolite is not responsible for this effect.

There are species differences in the neurotoxicity of PCA between rats and mice, which may help to shed light on the underlying mechanisms.

===== Structure–activity relationships of neurotoxicity =====
The drug is the most potent serotonergic neurotoxin of a series of amphetamines. In terms of structure–activity relationships, the α-methyl group appears to be essential for the neurotoxicity, and the α-ethyl analogue is less potent as a neurotoxin. Other side chain homologues with shorter or longer chains were less potent or inactive. Moving the chloro substituent to other positions on the phenyl ring, as in ortho-chloroamphetamine (OCA) and meta-chloroamphetamine (MCA), resulted in no significant serotonergic depletion, in contrast to the marked depletion with PCA. However, this was found to be due to rapid metabolism in the case of MCA, and inhibiting its metabolism resulted in potent neurotoxicity as with PCA. Conversely, OCA still does not produce apparent neurotoxicity.

para-Bromoamphetamine (PBA) and para-bromomethamphetamine (PBMA) show similar serotonergic neurotoxicity to PCA and PCMA. Conversely, para-fluoroamphetamine decreases serotonin levels but its effects appear to be much less persistent than those of PCA. Other 4-substituted amphetamines have reduced neurotoxicity (4-trifluoromethylamphetamine, 4-phenoxyamphetamine) or are inactive (4-methylamphetamine, para-methoxyamphetamine (PMA)) in terms of serotonin depletion. Fenfluramine and norfenfluramine, which are 3-trifluoromethylamphetamines, produce very long-lasting serotonergic neurotoxicity similarly to PCA but are slightly less active.

The closely related N-methylated derivative, para-chloromethamphetamine (PCMA), which is rapidly and extensively metabolized to para-chloroamphetamine in vivo, has neurotoxic properties as well, and is only slightly less potent than PCA in this regard. Other N-alkylated analogues of PCA also metabolize at least in part into PCA and produce serotonergic neurotoxicity. However, they show reduced activity, which may be due to their extent of conversion into PCA being reduced.

In contrast to PCA, the phentermine (i.e., α-methylated) analogue of PCA, chlorphentermine, which acts as a highly selective SRA, does not appear to produce serotonergic neurotoxicity.

Rigid analogues of PCA, like 6-chloro-2-aminotetralin (6-CAT), have also been assessed. 6-CAT depletes serotonin similarly to PCA, but its effects are smaller and shorter-lasting. Another analogue, Org 6582, in which a third ring structure has been added, is a selective serotonin reuptake inhibitor (SSRI) and no longer shows the serotonergic neurotoxicity of PCA and 6-CAT.

===== Use as a neurotoxin in scientific research =====
PCA is useful and widely employed as a serotonergic neurotoxin in scientific research. A variety of scientific findings have been made and published through employment of PCA. The drug is advantageous over other serotonergic neurotoxins like 5,6-dihydroxytryptamine (5,6-DHT) and 5,7-dihydroxytryptamine (5,7-DHT) in that it is active by systemic administration. Conversely, 5,6-DHT and 5,7-DHT do not cross the blood–brain barrier and must be administered directly into the brain. PCA also produces a different anatomical pattern of serotonergic neurotoxicity than 5,6-DHT and 5,7-DHT, which can be useful as well if there is a need to study different serotonergic areas or pathways.

=== Other actions ===
PCA has been found to act as a relatively potent monoamine oxidase A (MAO-A) inhibitor, with an IC_{50} of 1,900 to 4,000 nM.

PCA has been reported to act as an agonist of the rat trace amine-associated receptor (TAAR1). Conversely, it is not a significant agonist of the human TAAR1. The drug also appears to be inactive as an agonist of the mouse TAAR1. TAAR1 agonism has been implicated in modulating the effects of monoamine releasing agents (MRAs). In contrast to PCA, the MRA MDMA is a potent agonist of the mouse TAAR1. MDMA-induced in-vivo brain serotonin and dopamine release and hyperlocomotion are augmented in TAAR1 knockout mice relative to normal mice, whereas the in-vivo brain serotonin and dopamine release of PCA are not different between normal mice and TAAR1 knockout mice. In the same study, the TAAR1 agonist o-phenyl-3-iodotyramine (o-PIT) blunted the dopamine and serotonin release of PCA in mouse synaptosomes in vitro, an effect that was absent in synaptosomes from TAAR1 knockout mice. These findings led to conclusions that TAAR1 agonism by MDMA but not PCA auto-inhibits and constrains its own effects in rodents. Unlike in rodents however, MDMA is not a significant TAAR1 agonist in humans.

== Chemistry ==
PCA, also known as 4-chloroamphetamine, is a phenethylamine and amphetamine derivative.

Analogues of PCA include para-chloromethamphetamine (PCMA/4-CMA), para-bromoamphetamine (PBA/4-BA), para-fluoroamphetamine (PFA/4-FA), para-iodoamphetamine (PIA/4-IA), 4-methylamphetamine (4-MA), meta-chloroamphetamine (MCA/4-CA), ortho-chloroamphetamine (OCA/2-CA), 3,4-dichloroamphetamine (3,4-DCA), 2,4-dichloroamphetamine (2,4-DCA), chlorphentermine, 4-chloromethcathinone (4-CMC; clephedrone), 4-chlorophenylisobutylamine (4-CAB; AEPCA), 6-chloro-2-aminotetralin (6-CAT), 5-iodo-2-aminoindane (5-IAI), and Org 6582, among others.

== History ==
PCA was first synthesized by 1936 and was first developed for potential medical use in the 1960s.

== Society and culture ==
=== Legal status ===
==== China ====
As of October 2015, 4-CA is a controlled substance in China.

==== United States ====
PCA is not a scheduled compound in the United States.
