= 4-Fluoroamphetamine =

Psychoactive research chemical

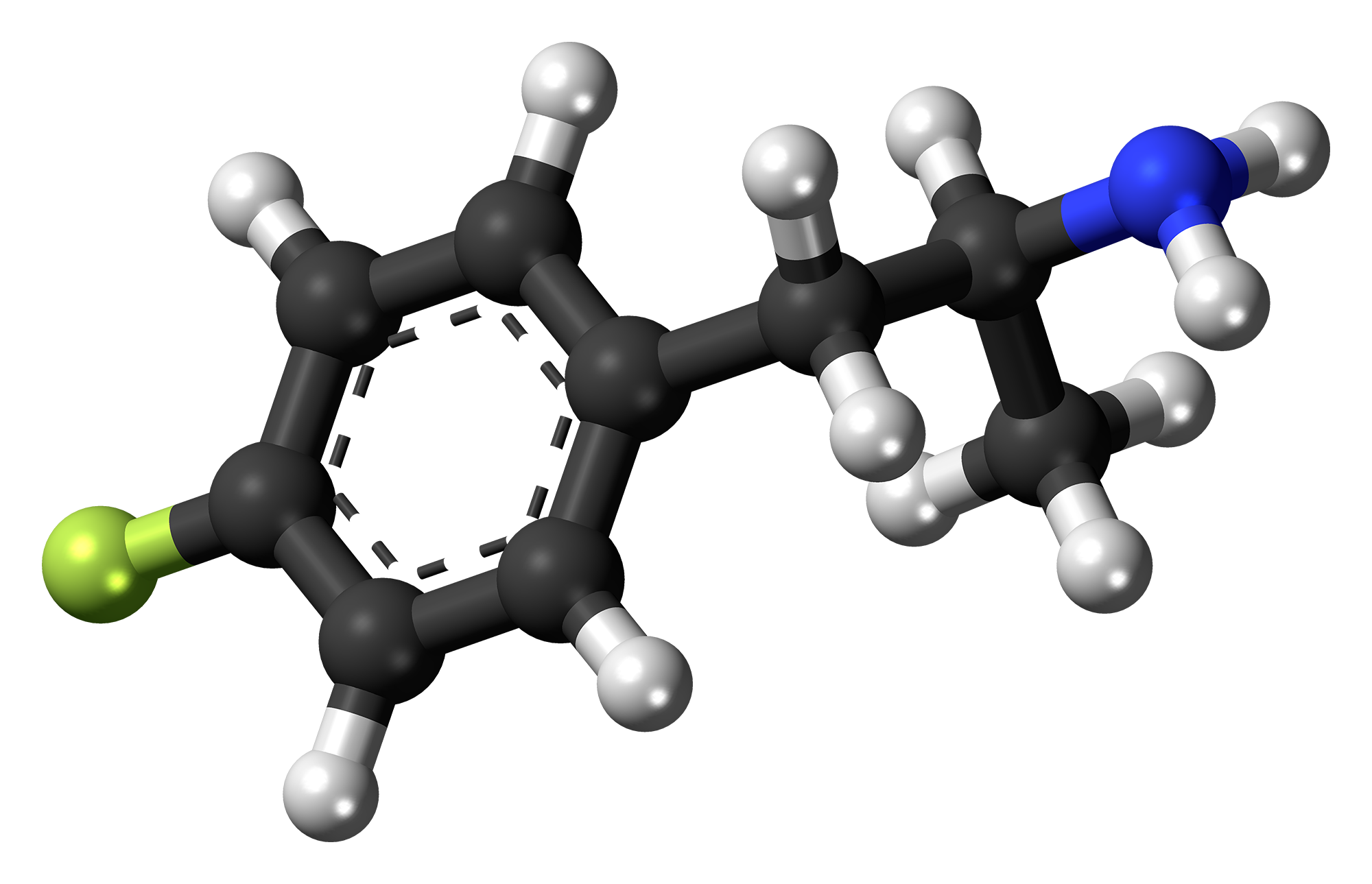

Clinical data
- Other names: 4-FA; 4-FMP; para-Fluoroamphetamine; PFA; PAL-303; PAL303; Flux
- Pregnancy category: N
- Routes of administration: Oral

Legal status
- Legal status: BR: Class F2 (Prohibited psychotropics); CA: Schedule I; DE: Anlage I (Authorized scientific use only); UK: Class A; US: Schedule I; UN: Psychotropic Schedule II

Pharmacokinetic data
- Duration of action: 3–7 hours

Identifiers
- IUPAC name: (RS)-1-(4-fluorophenyl)propan-2-amine
- CAS Number: 459-02-9
- PubChem CID: 9986
- ChemSpider: 9592
- UNII: S5744XYR1Z
- KEGG: C22767
- ChEMBL: ChEMBL2009392
- CompTox Dashboard (EPA): DTXSID90894758

Chemical and physical data
- Formula: C_{9}H_{12}FN
- Molar mass: 153.200 g·mol^{−1}
- 3D model (JSmol): Interactive image
- SMILES: Fc1ccc(cc1)CC(N)C
- InChI: InChI=1S/C9H12FN/c1-7(11)6-8-2-4-9(10)5-3-8/h2-5,7H,6,11H2,1H3; Key:DGXWNDGLEOIEGT-UHFFFAOYSA-N

4-Fluoroamphetamine (4-FA; 4-FMP; PAL-303; "Flux"), also known as para-fluoroamphetamine (PFA), is a psychoactive research chemical of the phenethylamine and substituted amphetamine chemical classes. It produces stimulant and entactogenic effects. As a recreational drug, 4-FA is sometimes sold along with related compounds such as 2-fluoroamphetamine and 4-fluoromethamphetamine.

== Usage ==
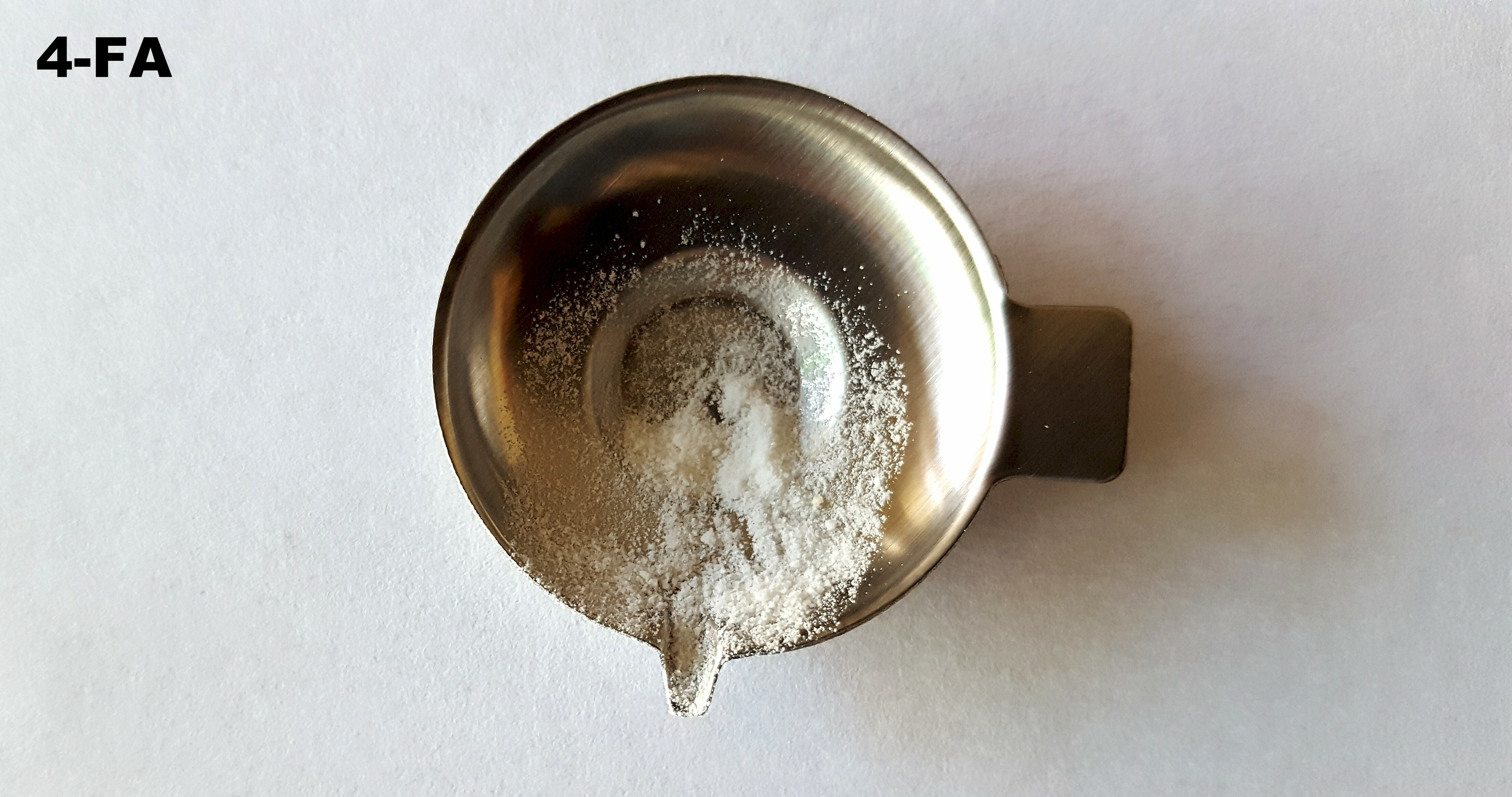
4-Fluoroamphetamine

4-FA was popular in the Netherlands where it was predominantly used for its specific effects (77% of users) rather than its legal status (18%). 4-FA has become illegal since May 2017. After it was banned, usage significantly decreased. Accurate statistics of usage are not available until 2020, but submitted samples to get tested were counted. In 2016 1.100 (10%) of samples tested for DIMS were 4-FA samples, in 2024 less than 50 4-FA samples were submitted. In 2020 0,3% of Dutch adults used 4-FA in the previous year, in 2024 this was just 0,1%.

=== Effects ===
The subjective effects of 4-fluoroamphetamine include euphoria which some find similar to the effects of MDMA and amphetamine, increased energy (stimulation), mood elevation, feelings of warmth and empathy, excessive talking, bruxism, and suppressed appetite (anorexic). The general course of effects involves primarily empathogenic effects for the first few hours, which fades out as increased stimulation develops over the next several hours.

The dopamine reuptake inhibition produced by 4-FA is stronger than that of either 4-CA or 4-IA. 4-FA also produces less hyperthermia than similar compounds such as PMA, 4-MTA and 4-methylamphetamine.

4-FA has been described as producing a very mild "psychedelic" state, intermediate between that of amphetamine and MDMA. It is unclear whether this is related to induction of monoamine release or serotonin 5-HT_{2A} receptor agonism.

Common acute side effects are nausea, headaches, increased heart rate and insomnia.

== Chemistry ==
4-FA reacts with reagent testing to give a semi-unique array of colors which can be used to aid its identification.

Final colors produced by reagent tests
Reagent	Reaction color
Marquis	No reaction
Mandelin	Pale Blue
Liebermann	Orange
Froehde	Faint purple/brown or no reaction.

== Pharmacology ==
4-Fluoroamphetamine is a releasing agent and reuptake inhibitor of dopamine, serotonin, and norepinephrine. The respective EC_{50} values are 200 nM, 730 nM, and 37 nM, while the IC_{50} values are 770 nM, 6800 nM, and 420 nM.

The drug shows some affinity for the serotonin 5-HT_{2A} receptor (K_{i} = 11,300 nM) and serotonin 5-HT_{2C} receptor (K_{i} = 7,800 nM), similar to that of MDMA in the case of the serotonin 5-HT_{2A} receptor (K_{i} = 5,900 nM), but far below the affinity of structurally related classical serotonergic psychedelics like 2C-B. It has also been shown to act as a very low-potency serotonin 5-HT_{2B} receptor partial agonist (EC_{50} = 14,400 nM; E_{max} = 58%).

4-Fluoroamphetamine has been found to be a weak monoamine oxidase A (MAO-A) inhibitor, with an IC_{50} of 16,000 nM. For comparison, the IC_{50} of amphetamine for MAO-A inhibition was 11,000 nM.

Regarding the metabolic fate of 4-FA, the C-F bond at the 4-position on the phenyl ring likely resists deactivation in the liver by cytochrome P450 oxidase.

=== Neurotoxicity ===
4-FA does not cause long-lasting depletion of brain serotonin, unlike its analogs 4-CA and 4-BA. This is thought to "reflect the inability of the fluoro-compound to be metabolized in the same way as the other haloamphetamines."

Neurotoxicity does not increase down the series of para-halogenated amphetamine derivatives, even though serotonin releasing potency does follow this trend. For example, 4-iodoamphetamine is less toxic than is 4-chloroamphetamine. Hence, this property is not related to serotonin releasing potency as such, since PAL-287 was reported to be not at all neurotoxic even though it is a powerful 5-HT releasing agent. It is unclear where 4-methylamphetamine fits in on the neurotoxicity scale. The extensive serotonergic neurotoxicity of 4-chloroamphetamine (and its brominated derivative), and the increased serotonergic toxicity of 4-methylamphetamine suggest that para-substitution seems to increase overall serotonergic (neuro)toxicity, compared to amphetamine. Exceptions include 4-MTA, a para-substituted, non-neurotoxic amphetamine.

=== Toxicology ===
The LD_{50} (mouse; i.p.) of 4-FA is 46 mg/kg.

Fluoroamphetamine (isomer not determined) in a capsule mixed with 25C-NBOMe was associated with three deaths in Melbourne in 2017.

== Legal status ==
As of October 2015, 4-FA is a controlled substance in China. 4-FA is banned in the Czech Republic. As of 25 May 2017 4-FA is a controlled substance in the Netherlands. 4-FA is also controlled in Australia, Belgium, UK, Germany, Israel, Slovakia, Bulgaria, Chile, Brazil, Canada, Poland, Croatia, Sweden, New Zealand and France.

4-FA is a controlled substance as of 27 August 2014 in South Korea.

=== Finland ===
Scheduled in the "government decree on narcotic substances, preparations and plants" and is therefore illegal.

=== United States ===
In the United States, on June 3, 2025 the DEA announced by federal register its intent to place 4-Fluoroamphetamine into Schedule I status with public comments closing on July 3, 2025. On January 15, 2026 the DEA placed 4-FA in Schedule 1 of the Controlled Substances Act effective February 17, 2026.

== See also ==
- 2-Fluoroamphetamine (2-FA)
- 3-Fluoroamphetamine (3-FA)
- 3,4-Difluoroamphetamine
- 4-Fluoromethamphetamine (4-FMA)
- 4-Fluoromethcathinone (4-FMC)
- 4'-Fluoro-4-methylaminorex
- para-Bromoamphetamine (PBA)
- para-Bromomethamphetamine (PBMA)
