= C11H17N =

The molecular formula C_{11}H_{17}N (molar mass : 163.25 g/mol, exact mass : 163.1361) may refer to:

- N,N-Dimethylamphetamine
- 2,5-Dimethylamphetamine
- 4-Ethylamphetamine
- Etilamfetamine (N-ethylamphetamine)
- α-Ethyl-N-methylphenethylamine
- Mephentermine, a cardiac stimulant
- 2-Methylmethamphetamine
- 4-Methylmethamphetamine
- 4-Methylphenylisobutylamine
- Phenpentermine (Pentorex)
- α-Propylphenethylamine
- Trimethylphenethylamines
  - 3,4,5-Trimethylphenethylamine
  - β,N,N-Trimethylphenethylamine
- Xylopropamine
