= Trimethylphenethylamine =

Structure of phenethylamine with substitution points marked.

Trimethylphenethylamine may refer to:

- α,α,β-Trimethylphenethylamine (Pentorex)
- α,α,N-Trimethylphenethylamine (Mephentermine)
- α,N,N-Trimethylphenethylamine (Dimethylamphetamine)
- α,N,3-Trimethylphenethylamine (Metaphedrine)
- α,N,4-Trimethylphenethylamine (4-Methylmethampetamine)
- α,3,4-Trimethylphenethylamine (Xylopropamine)
- β,N,N-Trimethylphenethylamine
- 3,4,5-Trimethylphenethylamine

== See also ==
- Methylphenethylamine
- Dimethylphenethylamine
