= C10H15N =

The molecular formula C_{10}H_{15}N (molar mass: 149.23 g/mol, exact mass: 149.1204 u) may refer to:

- Diethylaniline, reducing agent/acid-absorbing base
- N,N-Dimethylphenethylamine, flavoring agent/stimulant
- α-Ethylphenethylamine, stimulant
- Isopropylbenzylamine, synthesizer
- Levomethamphetamine, stimulant
- Methamphetamine, stimulant/narcotic
- Methylamphetamine
  - 3-Methylamphetamine, stimulant
  - 4-Methylamphetamine, stimulant/appetite suppressant
- Ortetamine, stimulant/narcotic
- Phenpromethamine, stimulant/former nasal inhaler
- Phentermine, appetite suppressant
- 2-Phenyl-3-aminobutane, stimulant
- 4-Phenylbutylamine, toxic substance
- 4-Ethylphenethylamine, structural analogue of phenylethylamine
