= Dimethylamphetamine (disambiguation) =

Dimethylamphetamine (DMeA) may refer to:

- N,N-Dimethylamphetamine (dimethylamphetamine; dimetamfetamine)
- N,α-Dimethylampetamine (mephentermine; N-methylphentermine)
- 2-Methyl-N-methylamphetamine (2-MMA)
- 3-Methyl-N-methylamphetamine (3-MMA; metaphedrine)
- 4-Methyl-N-methylamphetamine (4-MMA; mephedrine)
- 2,3-Dimethylamphetamine (2,3-DMeA)
- 2,4-Dimethylamphetamine (2,4-DMeA)
- 2,5-Dimethylamphetamine (2,5-DMeA)
- 2,6-Dimethylamphetamine (2,6-DMeA)
- 3,4-Dimethylamphetamine (3,4-DMeA; xylopropamine)
- 3,5-Dimethylamphetamine (3,5-DMeA)

== See also ==
- Methylamphetamine
