= C9H13N =

The molecular formula C_{9}H_{13}N may refer to:

- Dimethylbenzylamine
- Methylphenethylamines
  - Amphetamine (Benzedrine, Adderall)
    - Dextroamphetamine
    - Levoamphetamine
  - β-Methylphenethylamine
  - N-Methylphenethylamine
  - 2-Methylphenethylamine
  - 3-Methylphenethylamine
  - 4-Methylphenethylamine
- 2,4,6-Trimethylaniline
