= Dimethylphenethylamine =

Structure of phenethylamine with substitution points marked.

Dimethylphenethylamine may refer to:

- α,α-Dimethylphenethylamine (phentermine)
- N,α-Dimethylphenethylamine (methamphetamine)
- N,β-Dimethylphenethylamine (phenpromethamine)
- 2,α-Dimethylphenethylamine (ortetamine)
- 3,α-Dimethylphenethylamine (3-methylamphetamine)
- 3,4-Dimethylphenethylamine (DMePEA)
- 4,α-Dimethylphenethylamine (4-methylamphetamine)
- N,N-Dimethylphenethylamine
- α,β-Dimethylphenethylamine (2-phenyl-3-aminobutane)

== See also ==
- Methylphenethylamine
- Trimethylphenethylamine
