= C11H15NO =

The molecular formula C_{11}H_{15}NO (molar mass : 177.24 g/mol, exact mass : 177.115364) may refer to:

- 1-Aminomethyl-5-methoxyindane
- 5-APDB
- 6-APDB
- Buphedrone
- Ethcathinone
- Isoethcathinone
- Mephedrone
- Metamfepramone, a stimulant drug
- Methylmethcathinones
  - α-Methylmethcathinone
  - 3-Methylmethcathinone
  - 4-Methylmethcathinone
- MMAI
- Phenmetrazine
- Pseudophenmetrazine
