= Dimethylcathinone =

Dimethylcathinone may refer to:

- Metamfepramone (dimethylpropion; N,N-dimethylcathinone)
- α-Methylmethcathinone (βk-mephentermine; α,N-dimethylcathinone)

== See also ==
- 4-Methyl-N,N-dimethylcathinone
