= Methylamphetamine =

Methylamphetamine may refer to:

- Phentermine (α-methylamphetamine)
- 2-Phenyl-3-aminobutane (β-methylamphetamine)
- Methamphetamine (N-methylamphetamine)
- Ortetamine (2-methylamphetamine)
- 3-Methylamphetamine
- 4-Methylamphetamine

== See also ==
- Dimethylamphetamine
