= Methylmethcathinone =

Methylmethcathinone may refer to:

- RAD-081, also known as α-Methylmethcathinone
- Ortomephedrone, also known as 2-Methylmethcathinone
- Metaphedrone, also known as 3-Methylmethcathinone
- Mephedrone, also known as 4-Methylmethcathinone
