= C13H17NO2 =

The molecular formula C_{13}H_{17}NO_{2} (molar mass : 219.28 g/mol) may refer to:

- N-Acetyl-3-MMC
- Alminoprofen
- Dimemebfe
- DOH-FLY
- DOYN
- Methylenedioxyallylamphetamine, a psychedelic drug
- Pethidinic acid
- Ritalinic acid
- UWA-101
