= 3-Me-PVP =

Chemical compound

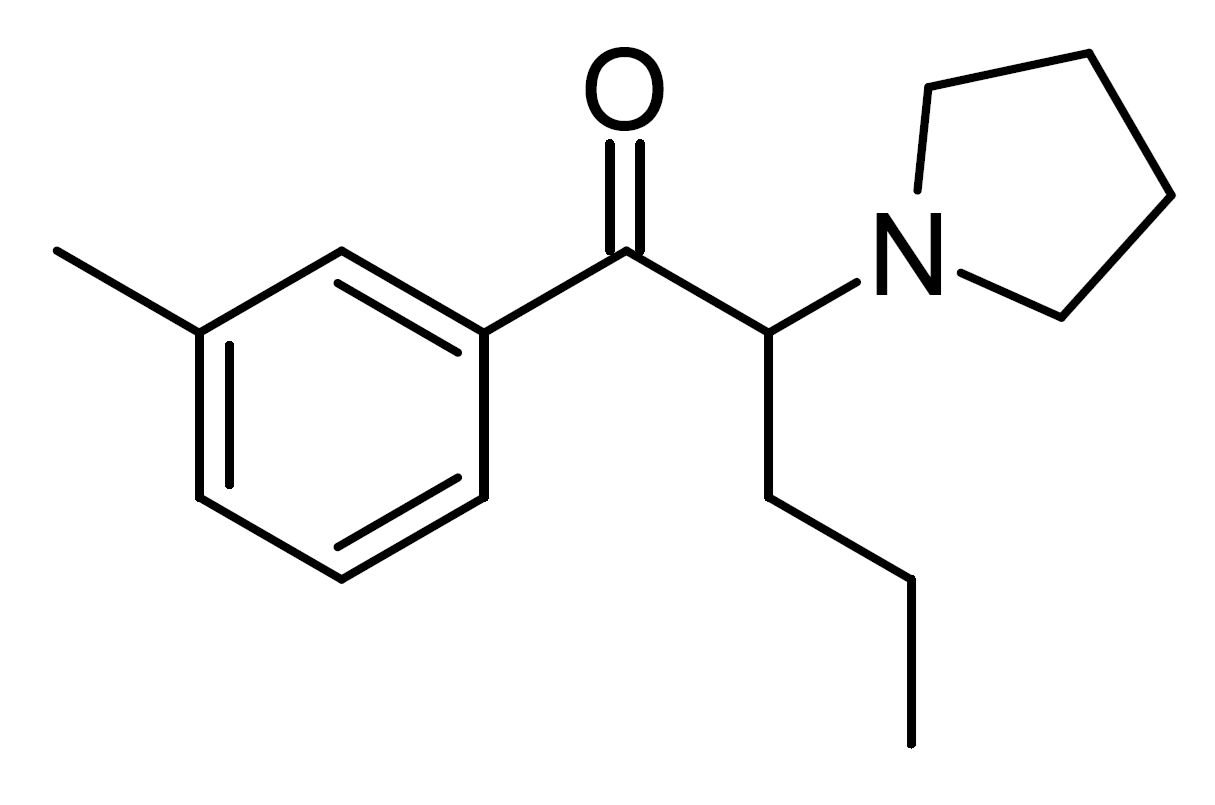

Legal status
- Legal status: DE: Anlage II (Authorized trade only, not prescriptible); UK: Class B

Identifiers
- IUPAC name: 1-(3-methylphenyl)-2-pyrrolidin-1-ylpentan-1-one
- CAS Number: 13415-85-5
- PubChem CID: 11470616
- ChemSpider: 9645446
- ChEMBL: ChEMBL204254

Chemical and physical data
- Formula: C_{16}H_{23}NO
- Molar mass: 245.366 g·mol^{−1}
- 3D model (JSmol): Interactive image
- SMILES: CCCC(C(=O)C1=CC=CC(=C1)C)N2CCCC2
- InChI: InChI=1S/C16H23NO/c1-3-7-15(17-10-4-5-11-17)16(18)14-9-6-8-13(2)12-14/h6,8-9,12,15H,3-5,7,10-11H2,1-2H3; Key:HHSYAWUBPBEDMP-UHFFFAOYSA-N

3-Methyl-alpha-PVP (3-Me-PVP, O-2480) is a substituted cathinone derivative with stimulant effects, which has been sold as a designer drug. It was first identified in Sweden in June 2023.

== See also ==
- 2-Me-PVP
- 3-MMC
- 3F-PVP
- Metaphedrine
- MFPVP
- O-2390
- Pyrovalerone
- TH-PVP
