= 3-Methylphenethylamine =

Names
- Preferred IUPAC name 2-(3-Methylphenyl)ethan-1-amine
- Other names 2-(3-Methylphenyl)ethanamine; 3-Methylbenzeneethanamine; 2-(m-Tolyl)ethan-1-amine

Identifiers
CAS Number	55755-17-4
3D model (JSmol)	Interactive image
ChEMBL	ChEMBL448576
ChemSpider	362941
ECHA InfoCard	100.189.789
EC Number	663-484-8
PubChem CID	410085
UNII	46YT56V48J
CompTox Dashboard (EPA)	DTXSID30971133
- InChI: InChI=1S/C9H13N/c1-8-3-2-4-9(7-8)5-6-10/h2-4,7H,5-6,10H2,1H3 Key: GUERDLPJJJMIEU-UHFFFAOYSA-N
- SMILES: CC1=CC(=CC=C1)CCN

Properties
Chemical formula	C_{9}H_{13}N
Molar mass	135.20622
Appearance	clear liquid at room temp.
Density	1.0±0.1 g/cm3
Boiling point	110 °C (230 °F; 383 K) / 20 mmHg; 240.9519 °C / 760 mmHg Experimental

Hazards
- Occupational safety and health (OHS/OSH)
Main hazards	Corrossive
- GHS labelling
Pictograms	(GHS05: Corrosive)
Signal word	Danger
Hazard statements	H314
Precautionary statements	P260, P264, P280, P301+P330+P331, P302+P361+P354, P304+P340, P305+P354+P338, P316, P321, P363, P405, P501
Flash point	90.5 ± 6.3 °C (194.9 ± 11.3 °F; 363.6 ± 6.3 K)
- Except where otherwise noted, data are given for materials in their standard state (at 25 °C [77 °F], 100 kPa). Infobox references

3-Methylphenethylamine (3MPEA) is an organic compound with the chemical formula of C_{9}H_{13}N. 3MPEA is a human trace amine associated receptor 1 (TAAR1) agonist, a property which it shares with its monomethylated phenethylamine isomers, such as amphetamine (α-methylphenethylamine), β-methylphenethylamine, and N-methylphenethylamine (a trace amine).

Very little data, even on toxicity, is available about its effects on humans other than that it is corrosive and activates the human TAAR1 receptor.
