= Cannabis in Brunei =

- Location of Brunei (dark green)
- Medicinal: Illegal
- Recreational: Illegal

The Misuse of Drugs Act, Chapter 27

Legislative Council of Brunei
- Long title: An Act to provide for the control of dangerous or otherwise harmful drugs and for purposes connected therewith.
- Citation: Misuse of Drugs Act
- Territorial extent: Whole of Brunei
- Enacted by: Legislative Council of Brunei
- Commenced: 1 July 1978

Amended by
- Misuse of Drugs Act 1979, Misuse of Drugs Act 1984, Misuse of Drugs Act 2001, Misuse of Drugs Act 2013
- Status: Amended

Cannabis in Brunei is illegal and can be punishable by caning or the death penalty. Brunei Darussalam's legislation is controlled by its sultan and is based on the country's Sharia-Islamic beliefs. In accordance with these laws, Brunei native, Lam Ming Hwa, received the death sentence in 2004 and a Malaysian native, Muhammad Mustaqim Mustofa bin Abdullah, was sentenced to death in 2017.

Cannabis (also known as marijuana, ganja, pot, grass, hashish, and weed) is the second most prominent drug in Brunei, behind methamphetamine. The United Nation Office on Drugs and Crime has reported a downward trend of cannabis usage in 2017-2018, after Brunei experienced an increased usage in 2013-2016. In response to the incidence of drug-abuse in Brunei, the Brunei's Narcotics Control Bureau (NCB) has created multiple divisions to aid in drug prevention and rehabilitation.

== Brunei's Sultan, the Malay Islamic Monarchy, and drugs ==
Post-independence in 1984, Brunei Darussalam's has existed as an Islamic state. Following the pillars of the Malay Islamic Monarchy (MIB), Brunei has aligned the country's legislation and beliefs in accordance with its Malaysian culture, Islam, and the sultanate.

There is an ongoing debate in Islam regarding whether cannabis is halal. The Quran does not explicitly ban the use of cannabis, however it bans praying while intoxicated.

Brunei's Sultan, Sultan Haji Hassanal Bolkiah Mu'izzaddin Waddaulah, contains the authority and responsibility of constructing the country's law to maintain Islamic morals within Brunei. Brunei's laws ban the use of cannabis, along with other narcotics.

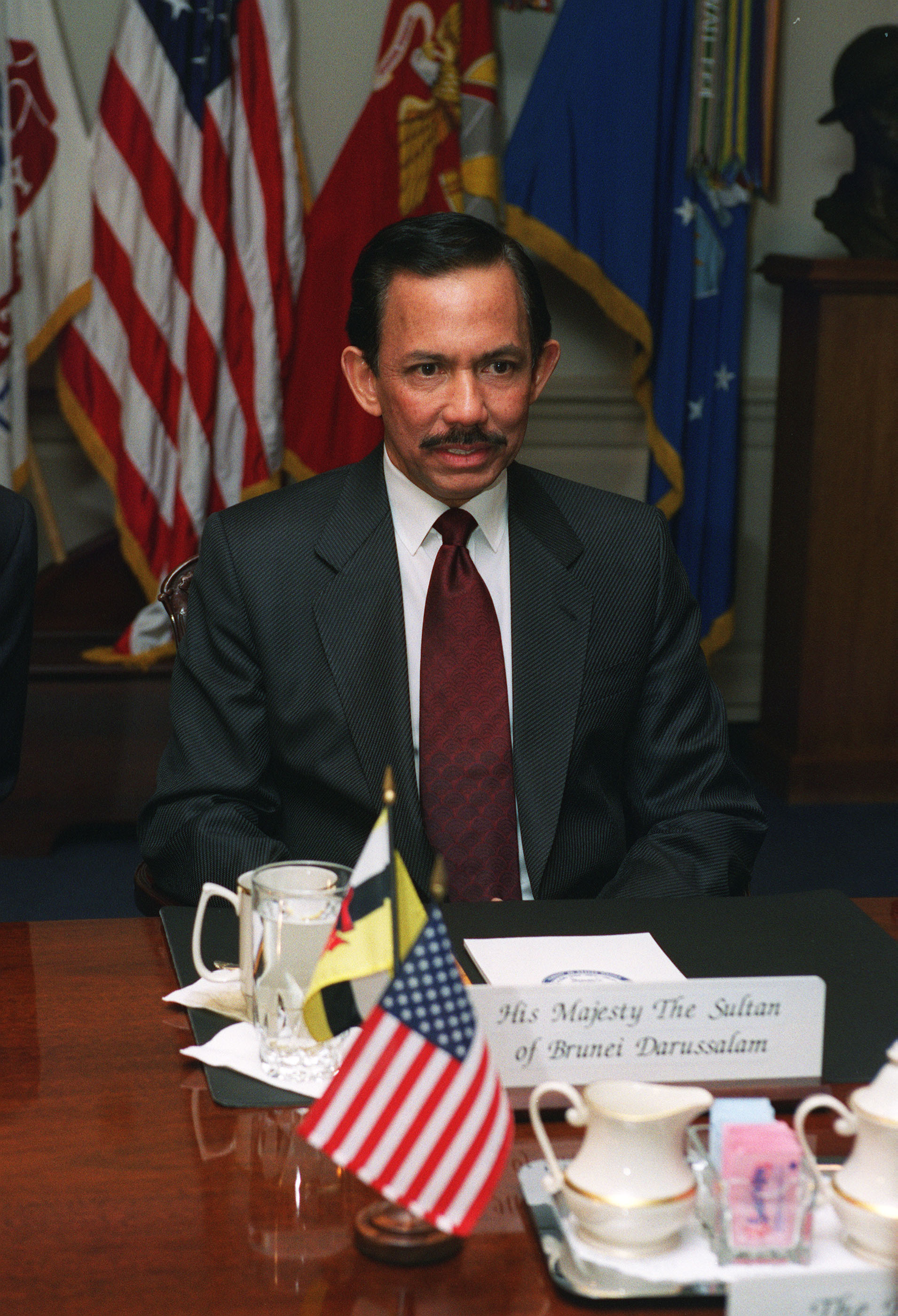
Brunei Darussalam's Sultan Haji Hassanal Bolkiah Mu'izzaddin Waddaulah in 2002

=== Introduction of the Islamic Criminal Law Act ===
In 1996 Sultan Hassanal Bolkiah announced his plans for the Islamic Sharia laws to structure Brunei's court system, thus forming the foundation of the Islamic Criminal Law Act. Along with this announcement, he identified drugs as a danger to Brunei's society, and compared drugs to the ongoing HIV/AIDS pandemic.

=== 2008 Drug "tragedy" ===
Press coverage relating to drug misuse increased greatly due to the previous year's 33% increase in drug-related arrests compared to 2006. Drug-misuse in Brunei's youth became a major subject of concern for the Sultan during Brunei's 24th independence day celebration, with the Sultan labelling it as a "tragedy".

Additional funding was provided by the Minister of Finance, to aid in controlling the nation's increased drug prevalence. It was used to add six new persons to Brunei's Narcotic Control Bureau (NCB), resulting in a total of 152 bureau members, with plans to add 30 more personnel to the bureau in following years.

Brunei collaborated with Malaysia in creating anti-drug agreements to fight the war against drugs in their respective countries. They hosted joint workshops, training seminars, and arranged a meeting between Malaysia's King and Brunei's Sultan.

=== Bruneian international "drug mules" ===
2009 marked a change in Brunei's Narcotics Control Bureau's (NCB) handling of the country's international drug affairs, after multiple Bruneian nationals were arrested and charged with drug smuggling on international borders. A Bruneian man was arrested for smuggling 500 grams of cannabis leaving the Malaysian territory of Labuan. Additionally, multiple Bruneian women had been paid by foreigners to smuggle drugs across international borders, thus branding them as "drug mules". The NCB put in place modules for drug prevention within the education system and held public conferences.

== Legislation ==
The current legislation regarding narcotics in Brunei is the Misuse of Drugs Act edited in 2013. The document identifies two forms of cannabis: cannabis (containing cannabis resin) and isolated cannabis resin. Cannabis was classified as a class B drug in the 2001 amendment of the Misuse of Drugs Act, but was promoted to a class A drug in the 2013 amendment.

Possession and use of cannabis and its resin is strictly prohibited in Brunei, both obtaining maximum sentences of 10 years and/or a USD20,000 fine.

Brunei Darussalam Cannabis Laws
| | Highest sentence: 30yrs & 15 whips (cane) Lowest sentence: 20rs & 15 whips (cane) | Death sentence |
|---|---|---|
| Cannabis trafficking | 330g ≤ substance ≤ 500g | > 500g |
| Cannabis resin trafficking | 130g ≤ substance ≤ 200g | > 200g |
| Cannabis ownership, with motive of trafficking | 400g ≤ substance ≤ 600g | > 600g |
| Cannabis resin ownership, with motive of trafficking | 200g ≤ substance ≤ 300g | > 300g |
| Cannabis import/export | 330g ≤ substance ≤ 500g | > 500g |
| Cannabis resin import/export | 130g ≤ substance ≤ 200g | > 200g |

Table: Cannabis/resin quantities (g = grams) that warrant each sentence within multiple drug categories (left vertical column). As outlined in the Misuse of Drugs Act.

In the 2013 amendment of the Misuse of Drugs Act, the assumption of cannabis trafficking occurs when an individual possesses greater than 15g and 10g of cannabis and cannabis resin respectively.

Possession of a pipe or any other equipment used to smoke cannabis is illegal and is punishable by a maximum sentence of 3 years in prison, and a USD10,000 fine.

Withholding from providing a urine sample to law enforcement can be charged a fine of USD5,000.

Cultivating cannabis is illegal according to the Misuse of Drugs Act (2013), with the maximum punishment being 20 years in prison and/or a USD40,000 fine and the minimum sentence is 3 years in prison and/or a USD5,000 fine.

== Prevalence ==
=== 2001 ===
547 drug-related arrests occurred in 2001, with 84% of the convicted being Bruneian. The Sultan worked alongside the NCB in 2002 to ensure stricter regulations toward drug trafficking, by changing the Drug Trafficking Act. Following this change, the death penalty would be imposed on drug-related crimes involving smaller drug quantities.

=== 2007 ===
732 total drug-use related arrests, a 33% increase from 2006, with most cases being present in the Bruneian youth.

=== 2015 ===
639 drug-related arrests occurred, with 90% of this population being Bruneian nationals. Cannabis-related crimes occurred in only 5% of these drug-arrests, second to Methylamphetamine. 3000.83 grams of the Cannabis herb was confiscated that year, with 1.8 kg retrieved in the six borders guarded by the NCB, including Brunei National Airport and the ferry station.

=== 2016 ===
Cannabis continued to be the second most prominent drug in Brunei. Both the rate of cannabis cases, 5.1 per 100,000 population, and amount of cannabis seized by the NCB increased from 2015 to 2016.

43 cannabis-related arrests occurred in 2016, resulting in a capture of 5.97 kg of cannabis (equivalent of USD66,743.50). All of these arrests were men and new admissions. A majority of those arrested for cannabis abuse-related crimes were of Malay ethnicity, above 31 years of age and unemployed.

In 2016, only three men were arrested for cannabis consumption in Brunei.

=== 2017 ===
Drug prevalence within the Bruneian youth (under 20-years-old) increased from 2016, 18 drug-related youth arrests, to 2017's 66 drug-related youth arrests. In Brunei 2017, two men were arrested for cannabis consumption.

35 cannabis-related arrests occurred in 2017; a great number of the arrested individuals were in the over-31 age group and of Malay ethnicity. More than 1.1 kg of cannabis was attained by the NCB. A small amount of cannabis plants and seeds were seized by the NCB, totalling to only 97g.

=== 2018 ===
Methamphetamine remained the most prevalent drug in Brunei in 2018, while the United Nations Office on Drugs and Crime 2018 shows a decreasing trend in arrests for illicit drug-use and cannabis-use from 2017 to 2018. 400 grams of Cannabis was seized in 2018, compared to the 1.1 kg in 2017. The NCB reported cannabis costs in 2017 and 2018 to be USD11 per gram.

== Arrest cases ==
Map of Brunei showing its Tutong region

=== La Ming Hwa ===
On 24 November 2002, two Malay defendants, Lam Ming Hwa and Sylvester Anak Kulit, were searched by the NCB and consequently arrested in the Tutong region in Brunei.

Both defendants were charged and pled guilty for the consumption of cannabis and methylamphetamine. Additionally, the defendants had been charged with intent of trafficking the cannabis within their possession.

Investigators found 922 grams of cannabis underneath the front passengers seat of Hwa's automobile. The court's evidence consisted of a black package (containing cannabis) within a plastic bag. Hwa's fingerprint was detected on the black packaging and Kulit's fingerprint was detected on the plastic bag.

Kulit claimed to have touched the bag as he was moving the passenger seat back, but was unaware of its contents as it was not his vehicle. Due to reasonable doubt, Kulit was found innocent and received a sentence of 3 months prison-time for admitting his consumption of methylamphetamine.

Hwa's verdict was death by hanging, after completing a prison sentence of three years for each guilty charge.

=== Muhammad Mustaqim Mustofa bin Abdullah ===
The NCB seized a total of greater than 6 kg of cannabis from a Malaysian man (age 26), Muhammad Mustaqim Mustofa bin Abdullah, on 7 May 2014. Abdullah claimed to have purchased the cannabis (totaling USD7,500) two days prior, in Kuala Lumpur. He continued to smuggle the drugs into Brunei through Miri.

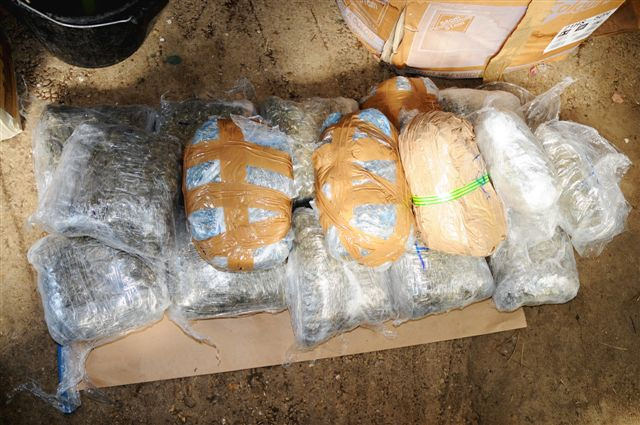
Seized drugs contained in plastic receptacles

The NCB was initially suspicious of Abdullah's possessions due to information provided by Bruneian civilians. Two receptacles containing cannabis were found within Abdullah's green automobile, in a parking area in Kampong Petan, Tutong.

Following their findings, the NCB searched Abdullah's home, where another bag of cannabis was contained in a safety box. Abdullah declared his prior plan to dispose of the illegal substances in the forest, before he was arrested by the NCB.

After one month of court proceedings, Abdullah was charged with possession of cannabis with the intent of trafficking. He was sentenced to death after completing a maximum of 20 years in prison and 15 lashes with the cane.

== Brunei's drug solutions ==
The NCB has created three separate divisions that focus on drug education, prevention and rehabilitation. The drug education is put in place for both drug-abusers and non-drug users, along with rehabilitation and reintegration programs for drug addicts. These programs aim to decrease the drug prevalence in Brunei Darussalam.

=== Preventative drug education ===
This NCB division aims to reduce drug use, increase drug awareness, and guide civilians through drug-related problems, including those between family members who may be involved in drug-abuse. This program specifically targets those who are not currently abusing illegal substances, aiding people of all backgrounds: students and the youth, those in the workforce and generally all members of the community.

Children and the youth are catered to via school-based drug education programs involving anti-drug games, activities, and group discussions between the ages of 8 and 13. This program is compulsory during higher-education induction periods. Workplaces conduct talks, exhibitions, and random urine drug testing to encouraged a no-drug environment to the Bruneian workforce. Community anti-drug events are held during school holidays in public spaces such as shopping and convention centres, aiming to target all Bruneian citizens.

There are three general strategies used within this division. Each strategy focuses on different aspects of drug prevention: knowledge on drugs and their laws, psycho-social maintenance to prevent drug use, and how a family dynamic can successfully rehabilitate drug abusers. The knowledge approach consists of discussions and 'scare tactics' regarding the NCB, Misuse of Drugs Act and consequences of drugs, the use of brochures, posters and social media to disseminate a negative message towards drugs and the conduction of random drug testing on all citizens. The psycho-social approach contains exercises for managing peer-pressure, stress and independence, and learning how to convey opinions and develop resilience. The family education approach aims to provide Bruneian families with the framework to aid in preventing familial drug use, along with providing rehabilitation techniques.

=== Treatment and rehabilitation ===
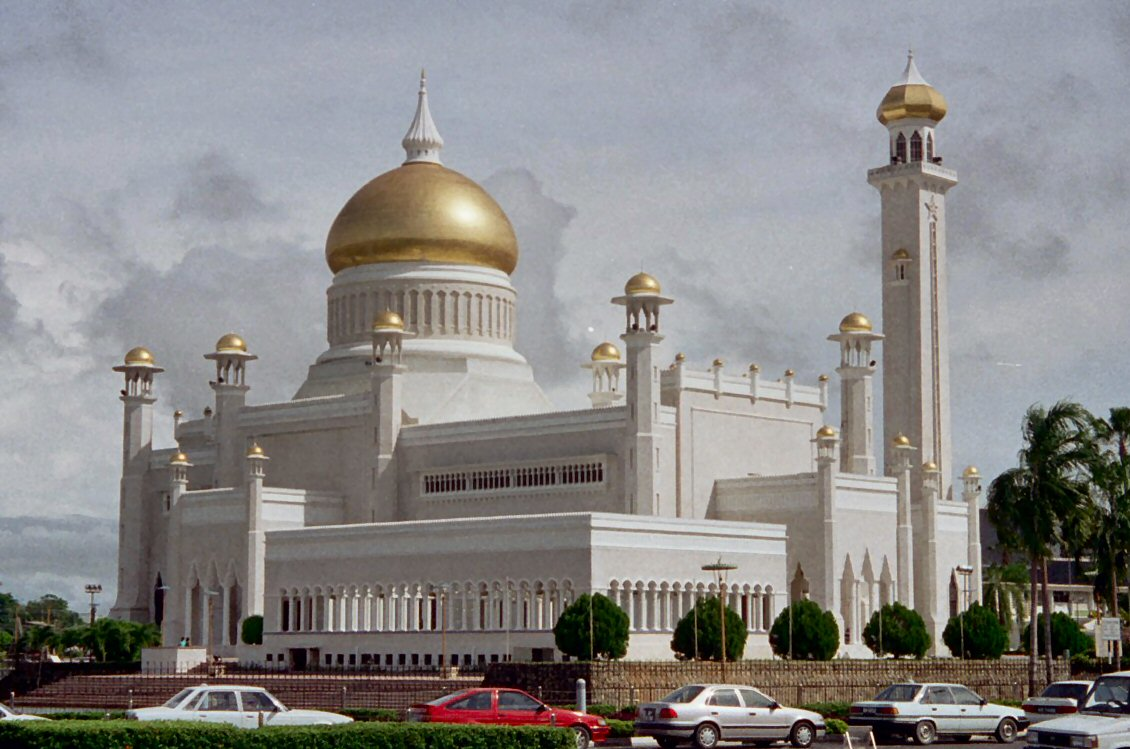
Islamic Mosque, "Masjid Sultan Omar Ali Saifuddin", in Brunei

Drug-abusers may be sent to Al-Islah Treatment and Rehabilitation Centre (Brunei's only substance-abuse centres) voluntarily or by court order. This centre specialises in a treatment that prioritizes peer, family and religious support to aid in rehabilitation. The patients ideally provide and receive emotional, psychological and intellectual reinforcement from their peers. The centre contains programs focusing on spiritual faith, communication skills and how to reintegrate into society once treatment is completed (i.e. joining the workforce).

=== Supervision scheme ===
In accordance with Brunei's drug-use legislation, this is a compulsory two-year scheme for all drug-users in Brunei. Individuals conducting this scheme are aided in their rehabilitation by supervisors that conduct routine urine drug tests, home visits, and familial meetings.

== Sources ==
- Begawan, Bandar Seri (14 February 2017). "Man Convicted of Drug Possession to Be Hanged". BruDirect.
- Black, Ann (2008). "Ideology and Law: The Impact of the MIB Ideology on Law and Dispute Resolution in the Sultanate of Brunei Darussalam". Asian Journal of Comparative Law. 3: 1–41. doi:10.1017/S2194607800000168.
- "Brunei's Preventive Drug Education Approach". ASEAN Preventative Drug Education Portal. Central Narcotics Bureau. 21 April 2020.
- Ezam, Rol; Rizal, Malai Fadley (27 October 2004). "Borneo: M'sian sentenced to death for possessing cannabis". Borneo Bulletin – via Cannabis Campaigners Guide.
- Hosni, Amin (12 February 2010). "Prince officiates opening of new Al-Islah". Sultanate.
- Kanato, Manop; Choomwattana, Chuanpit; Sarasiri, Rachanikorn; Leyatikul, Poonrut (2018). "ASEAN Drug Monitoring Report 2017". ASEAN Narcotics Cooperation Center, Association of Southeast Asian Nations.
- Kanato, Manop; Leyatikul, Poonrut; Choomwattana, Chuanpit (2017). "ASEAN Drug Monitoring Report 2016" (PDF).
- Kanato, Manop; Leyatikul, Poonrut; Choomwattana, Chuanpit; Thepwongsa, Isaraporn; Peungchuer, Kriengkrai (2016). "ASEAN Drug Monitoring Report 2015" (PDF). ASEAN Narcotics Cooperation Center, Association of Southeast Asian Nations. Archived from the original (PDF) on 1 March 2021.
- Me, Angela; Tettey, Justice (2019). "Synthetic Drugs in East and South-East Asia" (PDF). Global SMART programme, United Nations Office on Drugs and Crime.
- "Misuse of Drugs Act". Laws of Brunei: Acts and Regulations (PDF). Ministry of Health. 2001.
- Misuse of Drugs Act (PDF). Ministry of Health. 2013.
- Nahas, G. G. (December 1982). "Hashish in Islam 9th to 18th century". Bulletin of the New York Academy of Medicine. 58 (9): 814–831. PMC 1805385. PMID 6762898.
- "Preventive Drug Education". Narcotics Control Bureau. 2015.
- Roberts, Christopher; Onn, Lee Poh (2009). "BRUNEI DARUSSALAM: Cautious on Political Reform, Comfortable in ASEAN, Pushing for Economic Diversification". Southeast Asian Affairs. 2009: 61–82. JSTOR 27913378. S2CID 153893705.
- Sulaiman, Hamzah (2003). "NEGARA BRUNEI DARUSSALAM: Socio-Economic Concerns Amid Stability and Plenty". Southeast Asian Affairs (30) SEAA03e: 71–79. doi:10.1355/SEAA03E (inactive 11 July 2025). ProQuest 59781921.
- Thambipillai, Pushpa (March 2010). "BRUNEI DARUSSALAM IN 2009: Addressing the Multiple Challenges". Southeast Asian Affairs. 2010 (1) SEAA10E: 71–82. doi:10.1355/SEAA10E (inactive 1 July 2025). S2CID 155078207.
