= 4-Methylphenethylamine =

Names
- Preferred IUPAC name 2-(4-Methylphenyl)ethan-1-amine
- Other names PAL-503; PAL503; 2-(4-Methylphenyl)ethanamine; 2-(p-Tolyl)ethan-1-amine

Identifiers
CAS Number	3261-62-9
3D model (JSmol)	Interactive image
ChEMBL	ChEMBL103299
ChemSpider	69207
ECHA InfoCard	100.019.878
EC Number	221-865-2
PubChem CID	76751
UNII	2APY7DEB6E
CompTox Dashboard (EPA)	DTXSID70186305
- InChI: InChI=1S/C9H13N/c1-8-2-4-9(5-3-8)6-7-10/h2-5H,6-7,10H2,1H3 Key: VKJXAQYPOTYDLO-UHFFFAOYSA-N
- SMILES: CC1=CC=C(C=C1)CCN

Properties
Chemical formula	C_{9}H_{13}N
Molar mass	135.210 g·mol^{−1}
Appearance	Clear colorless to light yellow liquid
Density	0.93 g/mL
Boiling point	214 °C (417 °F; 487 K)

Hazards
- Occupational safety and health (OHS/OSH)
Main hazards	Corrosive
- GHS labelling
Pictograms	(GHS07: Exclamation mark)
Signal word	Warning
Hazard statements	H315, H319, H335
Precautionary statements	P261, P264, P264+P265, P271, P280, P302+P352, P304+P340, P305+P351+P338, P319, P321, P332+P317, P337+P317, P362+P364, P403+P233, P405, P501
Flash point	91 °C (196 °F)
- Except where otherwise noted, data are given for materials in their standard state (at 25 °C [77 °F], 100 kPa). Infobox references

4-Methylphenethylamine (4MPEA), also known as para-methylphenethylamine, is an organic compound with the chemical formula of C_{9}H_{13}N. 4MPEA is a human trace amine associated receptor 1 (TAAR1) agonist, a property which it shares with its monomethylated phenethylamine isomers, such as amphetamine (α-methylphenethylamine), β-methylphenethylamine, and N-methylphenethylamine (a trace amine). 4MPEA also appears to inhibit the human cytochrome P450 enzymes CYP1A2 and CYP2A6, based upon the published literature.
