= 3,4-Dimethylphenethylamine =

Clinical data
- Other names: DMePEA; 3,4-DMePEA
- ATC code: None

Identifiers
- IUPAC name: 2-(3,4-dimethylphenyl)ethanamine
- CAS Number: 17283-14-6
- PubChem CID: 410083
- ChemSpider: 362939
- UNII: 34WJ8QL8KX
- CompTox Dashboard (EPA): DTXSID90328422
- ECHA InfoCard: 100.199.619

Chemical and physical data
- Formula: C_{10}H_{15}N
- Molar mass: 149.237 g·mol^{−1}
- 3D model (JSmol): Interactive image
- SMILES: CC1=C(C=C(C=C1)CCN)C
- InChI: InChI=1S/C10H15N/c1-8-3-4-10(5-6-11)7-9(8)2/h3-4,7H,5-6,11H2,1-2H3; Key:IQXUVSNUSQIQCJ-UHFFFAOYSA-N

3,4-Dimethylphenethylamine (DMePEA) is a drug of the phenethylamine family related to the psychedelic drug mescaline (3,4,5-trimethoxyphenethylamine; 3,4,5-TMPEA). It is one of the positional isomers of dimethylphenethylamine.

It produces a strong rage reaction (which has been thought may be a correlate of hallucinogenic activity) and other behavioral effects in cats and produces body tremors and salivation in rats. The effects of DMePEA in humans have not been reported and are unknown.

DMePEA was first described in the scientific literature by 1960. It was included as an entry in Alexander Shulgin's 2011 book The Shulgin Index, Volume One: Psychedelic Phenethylamines and Related Compounds.

== See also ==
- Substituted phenethylamine
- Dimethylphenethylamine
- Xylopropamine (3,4-dimethylamphetamine; 3,4-DMeA)
- 3,4-Dimethylmethcathinone
- 3,4-Dimethoxyphenethylamine (DMPEA)
- 3,4-Dimethoxyamphetamine (3,4-DMA)
- 3,4,5-Trimethylphenethylamine (TMePEA)
