= Desoxymescaline =

Desoxymescaline may refer to:

- 3-Desoxymescaline (3-methyl-4,5-dimethoxyphenethylamine)
- 4-Desoxymescaline (4-methyl-3,5-dimethoxyphenethylamine; DESOXY)
- 5-Desoxymescaline (5-methyl-3,5-dimethoxyphenethylamine)
- 3,5-Didesoxymescaline (3,5-dimethyl-4-methoxyphenethylamine)
- 3,4,5-Tridesoxymescaline (3,4,5-trimethylphenethylamine; TMePEA)
