= 2-Methylphenethylamine =

Names
- Preferred IUPAC name 2-(2-Methylphenyl)ethan-1-amine
- Other names 2-(2-Methylphenyl)ethanamine; 2-Methylbenzeneethanamine; 2-(o-Tolyl)ethan-1-amine

Identifiers
CAS Number	55755-16-3
3D model (JSmol)	Interactive image
ChEMBL	ChEMBL451372
ChemSpider	1554538
ECHA InfoCard	100.199.500
EC Number	674-091-6
PubChem CID	2063868
UNII	B2VHM2W3X9
CompTox Dashboard (EPA)	DTXSID60366371
- InChI: InChI=1S/C9H13N/c1-8-4-2-3-5-9(8)6-7-10/h2-5H,6-7,10H2,1H3 Key: OWOUKRYOZIZVFK-UHFFFAOYSA-N
- SMILES: CC1=CC=CC=C1CCN

Properties
Chemical formula	C_{9}H_{13}N
Molar mass	135.210 g·mol^{−1}
Appearance	Clear colorless liquid at room temp
Density	0.96 g/cm3
Boiling point	97 °C (207 °F; 370 K) / 5 mmHg (270.7984 °C / 760 mmHg) Experimental

Hazards
- Occupational safety and health (OHS/OSH)
Main hazards	Corrosive; causes burns
- GHS labelling
Pictograms	(GHS05: Corrosive) (GHS07: Exclamation mark)
Signal word	Danger
Hazard statements	H314, H315, H319, H335, H412
Precautionary statements	P260, P264, P264+P265, P271, P273, P280, P301+P330+P331, P302+P352, P302+P361+P354, P304+P340, P305+P351+P338, P305+P354+P338, P316, P317, P319, P321, P332+P317, P337+P317, P362+P364, P363, P403+P233, P405, P501
- Except where otherwise noted, data are given for materials in their standard state (at 25 °C [77 °F], 100 kPa). Infobox references

2-Methylphenethylamine (2MPEA) is an organic compound with the chemical formula of C_{9}H_{13}N. 2MPEA is a human trace amine associated receptor 1 (TAAR1) agonist, a property which it shares with its monomethylated phenethylamine isomers, such as amphetamine (α-methylphenethylamine), β-methylphenethylamine, and N-methylphenethylamine (a trace amine).

Very little data, even on toxicity, is available about its effects on humans other than that it activates the human TAAR1 receptor.
