= Β,N,N-Trimethylphenethylamine =

β,N,N-Trimethylphenethylamine

Clinical data
- Other names: N,N-Dimethyl-2-phenylpropan-1-amine; N,N-DMPPA; DMPPA; β,N,N-TMPEA

Identifiers
- IUPAC name: N,N-dimethyl-2-phenylpropan-1-amine
- CAS Number: 7560-81-8
- PubChem CID: 65295
- ChemSpider: 58784
- CompTox Dashboard (EPA): DTXSID10964341

Chemical and physical data
- Formula: C_{11}H_{17}N
- Molar mass: 163.264 g·mol^{−1}
- 3D model (JSmol): Interactive image
- SMILES: CC(CN(C)C)C1=CC=CC=C1
- InChI: InChI=1S/C11H17N/c1-10(9-12(2)3)11-7-5-4-6-8-11/h4-8,10H,9H2,1-3H3; Key:JFNWQFWYAAPODB-UHFFFAOYSA-N

β,N,N-Trimethylphenethylamine, also known as N,N-dimethyl-2-phenylpropan-1-amine (N,N-DMPPA or DMPPA) is a monoamine releasing agent of the phenethylamine family. It is the N-methyl derivative of phenpromethamine (β,N-methylphenethylamine) and the N,N-dimethyl derivative of β-methylphenethylamine. The drug is a partial norepinephrine releasing agent, with an EC_{50} of 1,337 nM and an E_{max} of 67% in rat brain synaptosomes. Conversely, it was inactive on dopamine, whereas serotonin was not reported. The drug produces non-significant increases in blood pressure in rodents, but does not affect heart rate or affect locomotor activity. It may be rapidly metabolized and thereby inactivated. DMPPA was first described in the scientific literature by at least 2019.

== See also ==
- β-Methylamphetamine
- Dimethylamphetamine
