= 2-Me-PVP =

Stimulant designer drug of the substituted cathinone class

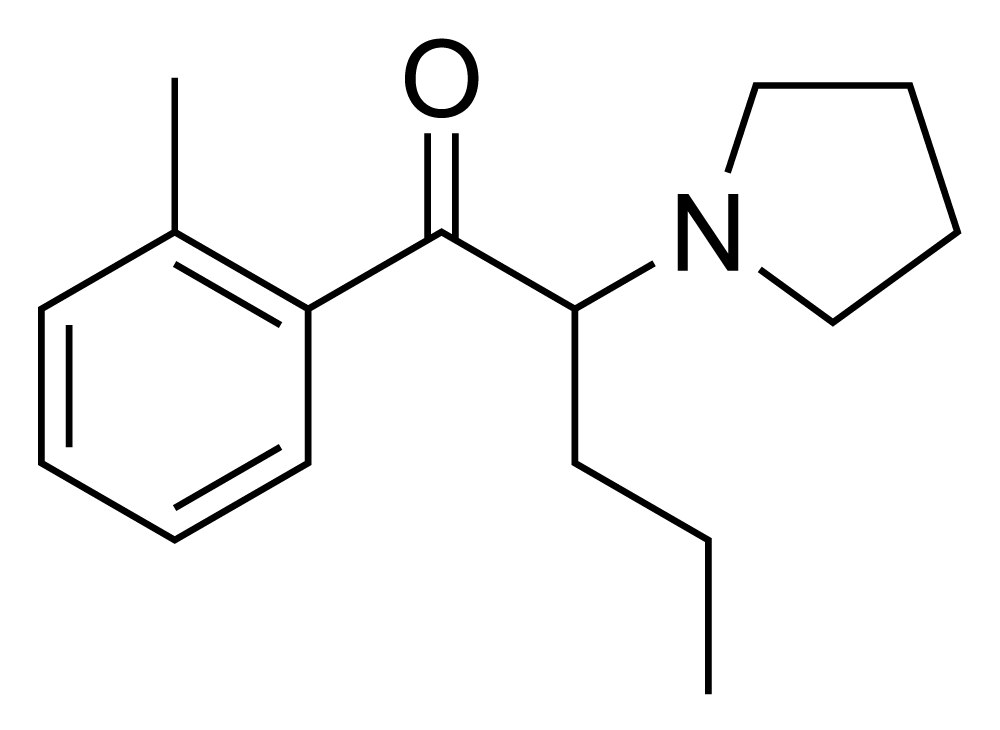

Legal status
- Legal status: DE: Anlage II (Authorized trade only, not prescriptible); UK: Class B

Identifiers
- IUPAC name: 1-(2-methylphenyl)-2-pyrrolidin-1-ylpentan-1-one
- CAS Number: 850352-54-4
- PubChem CID: 11311147
- ChemSpider: 9486115
- UNII: DRY2E23E56
- CompTox Dashboard (EPA): DTXSID401342782

Chemical and physical data
- Formula: C_{16}H_{23}NO
- Molar mass: 245.366 g·mol^{−1}
- 3D model (JSmol): Interactive image
- SMILES: CCCC(C(=O)C1=CC=CC=C1C)N2CCCC2
- InChI: InChI=1S/C16H23NO/c1-3-8-15(17-11-6-7-12-17)16(18)14-10-5-4-9-13(14)2/h4-5,9-10,15H,3,6-8,11-12H2,1-2H3; Key:VVIVTDYOMWHKAE-UHFFFAOYSA-N

2-Methyl-alpha-PVP (2-Me-PVP) is a substituted cathinone derivative with stimulant effects which has been sold as a designer drug. It was first identified in Sweden in 2021.

== See also ==
- 2-Methylmethcathinone
- 3F-PVP
- 3-Me-PVP
- 4-Cl-PVP
- 4-Et-PVP
- Ortetamine
