= Methylphenethylamine =

Structure of phenethylamine with substitution points marked. Methylphenethylamines have a phenethylamine backbone and a methyl group attached at one of these points.

Methylphenethylamine may refer to:

- α-Methylphenethylamine (amphetamine)
- β-Methylphenethylamine
- N-Methylphenethylamine (an endogenous trace amine in humans)
- 2-Methylphenethylamine
- 3-Methylphenethylamine
- 4-Methylphenethylamine

== See also ==
- Dimethylphenethylamine
- Trimethylphenethylamine
- Methoxyphenethylamine
- Phenethylamine, with the organic chemistry name phenyl-ethyl-amine
