= 4-Methyl-N,N-dimethylcathinone =

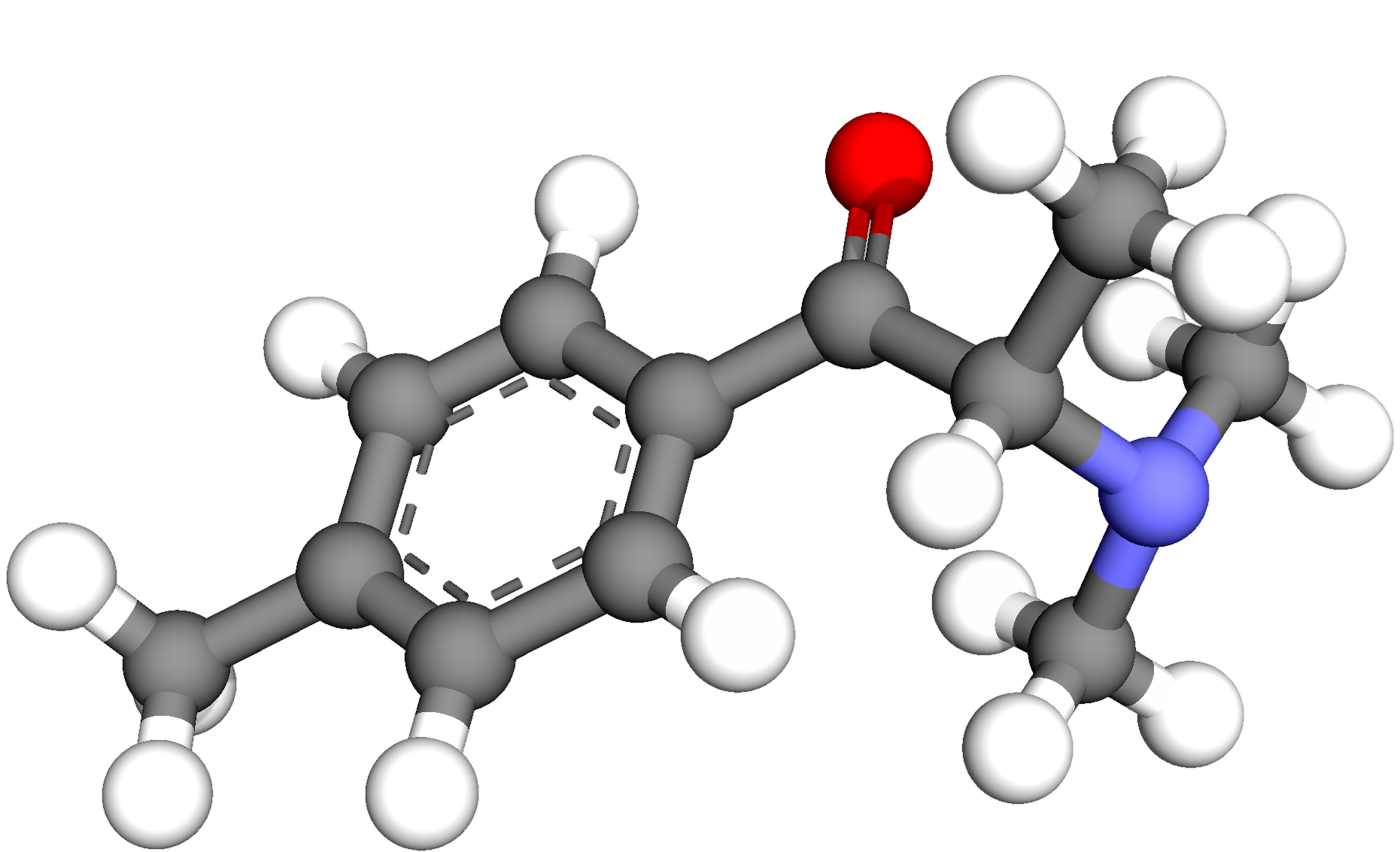
- racemic mixture

Clinical data
- Other names: 4-MDMC; 4-Methylmetamfepramone
- ATC code: none

Identifiers
- CAS Number: 1157738-08-3
- PubChem CID: 43794768
- ChemSpider: 38312372
- UNII: HBW8ZNF3EE
- CompTox Dashboard (EPA): 201342005

Chemical and physical data
- Formula: C_{12}H_{17}NO
- Molar mass: 191.274 g·mol^{−1}
- 3D model (JSmol): Interactive image
- SMILES: CN(C(C(=O)c1ccc(cc1)C)C)C
- InChI: InChI=1S/C12H17NO/c1-9-5-7-11(8-6-9)12(14)10(2)13(3)4/h5-8,10H,1-4H3; Key:FXLSIGLYVVJURY-UHFFFAOYSA-N

4-Methyl-N,N-dimethylcathinone (also known as 4-MDMC, 4-methyldimethylcathinone, or 4-methylmetamfepramone) is a new psychoactive substance central nervous system stimulant and a structural analog of mephedrone and, above all, metamfepramone. 4-MDMC is likely a prodrug of mephedrone.

== See also ==
- Substituted cathinone
