= 2-Methylmethcathinone =

Stimulant designer drug of the substituted cathinone class

Clinical data
- Other names: 2-MMC; 2Me-MC; Ortomephedrone
- Drug class: Stimulant; Serotonin–norepinephrine–dopamine releasing agent (SNDRA)

Legal status
- Legal status: UK: Class B; US: Schedule I

Identifiers
- IUPAC name: 1-(2-methylphenyl)-2-(methylamino)propan-1-one
- CAS Number: 1246911-71-6
- PubChem CID: 56603536
- ChemSpider: 37701507
- UNII: 8Z237SST51
- CompTox Dashboard (EPA): DTXSID001043043

Chemical and physical data
- Formula: C_{11}H_{15}NO
- Molar mass: 177.247 g·mol^{−1}
- 3D model (JSmol): Interactive image
- SMILES: CC1=CC=CC=C1C(=O)C(C)NC
- InChI: InChI=1S/C11H15NO/c1-8-6-4-5-7-10(8)11(13)9(2)12-3/h4-7,9,12H,1-3H3; Key:PRGXFAWAMOFULD-UHFFFAOYSA-N

2-Methylmethcathinone (2-MMC), also known as ortomephedrone, is a recreational designer drug with stimulant and euphoric effects. It is a substituted cathinone derivative, closely related to better known drugs such as 3-methylmethcathinone (3-MMC; metaphedrone) and 4-methylmethcathinone (mephedrone). It was first identified in Sweden in 2014, and has subsequently been reported in other European countries such as Poland and Spain.

== Pharmacology ==
=== Pharmacodynamics ===
2-MMC is a serotonin-norepinephrine-dopamine releasing agent, with higher preference for the norepinephrine and dopamine transporters. 2-MMC is expected to have similar characteristics to other cathinones, although studies show 2-substituted cathinones are weaker compared to 3 and 4-substituted ones. This is potentially due to steric hindrance.

In a study comparing various aryl-substituted methcathinone analogs in rat brain synaptosomes, the following values were found.

EC_{50} at MATs (nM)
DAT	NET	SERT
81 ± 8	53 ± 4	490 ± 15

== Chemistry ==
2-Methylmethcathinone's chemical name is 2-(methylamino)-1-phenylpropan-1-one. It is one of many substituted cathinones, synthetic chemicals derived from the natural chemical cathinone, found in khat. 2-MMC is a positional isomer of 3-MMC and 4-MMC.

== Society and culture ==
=== Popularity ===
2-MMC has been commonly sold as a replacement for 3-MMC (3-methylmethcathinone) due to controls in the Netherlands that affect its availability, among other factors. 3-CMC was initially sold as a popular replacement for it starting in 2022, but it is now less common on the market.

The European Union Drugs Agency reported that half of the samples they received in 2024 which were sold as 3-MMC contained 2-MMC. However, despite it being known as a substitute for 3-MMC, it can be found sold in its own right.

=== Legal status ===
2-MMC is controlled as a schedule I substance in the United States (under hallucinogenic substances) as it is a positional isomer of 4-MMC.

2-MMC is controlled in Germany under the NpSG (New Psychoactive Substances Act). Selling, production with the purpose of sale, and administration are punishable. Possession is illegal, but not penalized.

2-MMC is illegal in Poland. Although it is not included in the list of psychotropic substances, it falls under the group of psychotropic substances of group I-P as an isomer of 3-MMC and 4-MMC (mephedrone).

It is illegal in the United Kingdom as a class B drug.

== See also ==
- Substituted cathinone
- 2-Me-PVP
- 3-Chloromethcathinone
- 3-Methylmethamphetamine
- 2-Methylmethamphetamine
- Ortetamine (2-methylamphetamine)
