= Oxetacaine =

Chemical compound

Clinical data
- Routes of administration: Oral, topical
- ATC code: C05AD06 (WHO)

Pharmacokinetic data
- Elimination half-life: 1 hour

Identifiers
- IUPAC name: 2,2'-(2-hydroxyethylimino)bis [N-(1,1-dimethyl-2- phenylethyl)-N-methylacetamide]
- CAS Number: 126-27-2
- PubChem CID: 4621
- ChemSpider: 4460
- UNII: IP8QT76V17
- KEGG: D01152
- ChEMBL: ChEMBL127592
- CompTox Dashboard (EPA): DTXSID0025818
- ECHA InfoCard: 100.004.346

Chemical and physical data
- Formula: C_{28}H_{41}N_{3}O_{3}
- Molar mass: 467.654 g·mol^{−1}
- 3D model (JSmol): Interactive image
- SMILES: O=C(N(C(C)(C)Cc1ccccc1)C)CN(CCO)CC(=O)N(C(Cc2ccccc2)(C)C)C
- InChI: InChI=1S/C28H41N3O3/c1-27(2,19-23-13-9-7-10-14-23)29(5)25(33)21-31(17-18-32)22-26(34)30(6)28(3,4)20-24-15-11-8-12-16-24/h7-16,32H,17-22H2,1-6H3; Key:FTLDJPRFCGDUFH-UHFFFAOYSA-N

Oxetacaine (INN, also known as oxethazaine) is a potent local anesthetic. It is administered orally (usually in combination with an antacid) for the relief of pain associated with peptic ulcer disease or esophagitis. It is also used topically in the management of hemorrhoid pain. Oral oxetacaine preparations are available in several countries, including India, South Africa, Japan, Taiwan and Brazil, but not the United States. Unlike most local anesthetics, oxetacaine does not break down under strongly acidic conditions.

It is known to produce mephentermine and phentermine as metabolites.
