= Phenpromethamine =

Sympathomimetic nasal decongestant (Phenethylamine group)

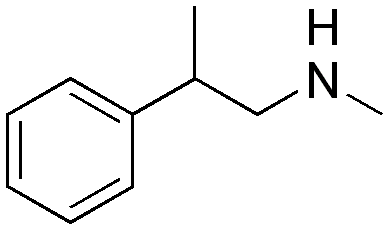

Clinical data
- Trade names: Vonedrine
- Other names: N,β-Dimethylphenethylamine; β,N-Dimethylphenethylamine; N,β-Dimethylbenzeneethanamine; Phenylpropylmethylamine; N-Methyl-2-phenylpropan-1-amine; MPPA; BMMPEA; β-Me-NMPEA; β,N-MePEA
- Routes of administration: Nasal inhaler
- Drug class: Norepinephrine–dopamine releasing agent
- ATC code: None

Legal status
- Legal status: DE: Anlage I (Authorized scientific use only)

Identifiers
- IUPAC name: N-methyl-2-phenylpropan-1-amine
- CAS Number: 93-88-9
- PubChem CID: 22276
- ChemSpider: 21277725
- UNII: 7D4542I59V
- CompTox Dashboard (EPA): DTXSID20861690
- ECHA InfoCard: 100.257.912

Chemical and physical data
- Formula: C_{10}H_{15}N
- Molar mass: 149.237 g·mol^{−1}
- 3D model (JSmol): Interactive image
- SMILES: CC(CNC)C1=CC=CC=C1
- InChI: InChI=1S/C10H15N/c1-9(8-11-2)10-6-4-3-5-7-10/h3-7,9,11H,8H2,1-2H3; Key:AUFSOOYCQYDGES-UHFFFAOYSA-N

Phenpromethamine (former brand name Vonedrine), also known as N,β-dimethylphenethylamine (MPPA, BMMPEA, β-Me-NMPEA, β,N-MePEA), is a sympathomimetic nasal decongestant of the phenethylamine group. It was previously marketed as a nasal inhaler from 1943 through 1960 but is no longer available. The medication is a stimulant and is banned by the World Anti-Doping Agency. It has been detected in dietary supplements starting in the 2010s.

The drug is a monoamine releasing agent (MRA) similarly to β-phenethylamine, amphetamine, and other phenethylamines. It is the N-methyl derivative of β-methylphenethylamine (BMPEA) and the β-methyl derivative of N-methylphenethylamine (NMPEA). Phenpromethamine is known to act as a norepinephrine–dopamine releasing agent (NDRA), with EC_{50} values of 154 nM for norepinephrine and 574 nM for dopamine in rat brain synaptosomes, whereas serotonin was not reported.

== See also ==
- β,N,N-Trimethylphenethylamine
- Methamphetamine (α,N-dimethylphenethylamine)
- Phenacylamine (β-ketophenethylamine)
- Phenylethanolamine (β-hydroxyphenethylamine)
- β-Methylamphetamine
