= N,N-Dimethylphenethylamine =

Names
- Preferred IUPAC name N,N-Dimethyl-2-phenylethan-1-amine
- Other names N,N-Dimethyl-2-phenylethanamine; N,N-Dimethyl-β-phenylethylamine; N,N-DMPEA

Identifiers
CAS Number	1126-71-2
3D model (JSmol)	Interactive image
ChEBI	CHEBI:188983
ChEMBL	ChEMBL46278
ChemSpider	23470
ECHA InfoCard	100.156.869
EC Number	628-613-4
PubChem CID	25125
UNII	I4C10U12C8
CompTox Dashboard (EPA)	DTXSID40150114
- InChI: InChI=1S/C10H15N/c1-11(2)9-8-10-6-4-3-5-7-10/h3-7H,8-9H2,1-2H3 Key: TXOFSCODFRHERQ-UHFFFAOYSA-N
- SMILES: CN(C)CCC1=CC=CC=C1

Properties
Chemical formula	C_{10}H_{15}N
Molar mass	149.237 g·mol^{−1}
- Except where otherwise noted, data are given for materials in their standard state (at 25 °C [77 °F], 100 kPa). Infobox references

N,N-Dimethylphenethylamine (N,N-DMPEA) is a substituted phenethylamine that is used as a flavoring agent. It is an alkaloid that was first isolated from the orchid Pinalia jarensis. (Note: Formerly placed in Eria.) Its aroma is described as "sweet, fishy". It is mainly used in cereal, cheese, dairy products, fish, fruit and meat. It is also being used in pre-workout and bodybuilding supplements with claims of a stimulant effect.

There is also evidence suggesting that N,N-DMPEA acts as a TAAR1 agonist in humans, and as a 5-HT1A ligand in rats. Some less conclusive research also indicated that it had interaction with MAO-B, most likely as an enzyme substrate and not an inhibitor.

N,N-DMPEA is a positional isomer of methamphetamine. Instead of the methyl group attached to the alpha position of phenylethylamine, it is attached to the nitrogen group. Both substances have the chemical formula C_{10}H_{15}N.

== Safety ==
N,N-DMPEA has been found to be safe for use as a flavoring agent by the Flavor and Extract Manufacturers Association (FEMA) Expert Panel and also by the Joint Expert Committee on Food Additives (JECFA)—a collaboration between the Food and Agricultural Organization of the United Nations (FAO) and the World Health Organization.

== Legality ==
In the United States, it is illegal to market N,N-DMPEA as a dietary supplement. N,N-DMPEA is not covered under the Schedule II drug laws surrounding isomers of methamphetamine; the definition of isomer is solely limited to optical isomers in the pertaining section.
