= 4-Phenylbutylamine =

Clinical data
- Other names: Benzenebutanamine

Identifiers
- IUPAC name: 4-phenylbutan-1-amine
- CAS Number: 13214-66-9
- PubChem CID: 83242
- DrugBank: DB04311
- ChemSpider: 75107
- UNII: UG8K2LT79Y
- ChEBI: CHEBI:44814
- ChEMBL: ChEMBL79512
- PDB ligand: PBN (PDBe, RCSB PDB)
- CompTox Dashboard (EPA): DTXSID50157371

Chemical and physical data
- Formula: C_{10}H_{15}N
- Molar mass: 149.237 g·mol^{−1}
- 3D model (JSmol): Interactive image
- SMILES: C1=CC=C(C=C1)CCCCN

4-Phenylbutylamine
Hazards
- GHS labelling
Pictograms	(GHS05: Corrosive) (GHS07: Exclamation mark)
Signal word	Danger
Hazard statements	H314, H315, H319, H335
Precautionary statements	P260, P264, P264+P265, P271, P280, P301+P330+P331, P302+P352, P302+P361+P354, P304+P340, P305+P351+P338, P305+P354+P338, P316, P319, P321, P332+P317, P337+P317, P362+P364, P363, P403+P233, P405, P501
- Except where otherwise noted, data are given for materials in their standard state (at 25 °C [77 °F], 100 kPa). Infobox references

4-Phenylbutylamine, also known as benzenebutanamine or 4-PBA, is a phenylalkylamine or phenylbutylamine, consisting of a benzene ring in which one of the hydrogen atoms is substituted by a 4-aminobutyl group. It is a primary amine and a member of the benzene class of organic compounds. It penetrates lipid bilayers in the cubic liquid-crystalline phase. The 4-phenylbutylamine molecule exists in the form of four stable rotamers.

A serine protease inhibitor, it has been used in research as a test inhibitor to study the function of the enzyme trypsin. It is capable of mimicking the side chain of the amino acid lysine or arginine, which allows it to bind to the active site of the enzyme trypsin.

Modification of hen egg-white lysozyme with 4-phenylbutylamine using EDC creates derivatives with 0.6-0.7 modified residues and about 60 percent activity. Kinetic data shows that this modified lysozyme increases the k_{cat} of SucGly_{2}Phe-4-nitroanilide hydrolysis by α-chymotrypsin by 20 times, without changing the K_{m}. The apparent dissociation constant (K_{d}) for the lysozyme-chymotrypsin complex is 0.03 mM and does not depend on substrate concentration. This effect is specific to α and δ-chymotrypsins; other serine proteases or similar derivatives of ribonuclease and α-lactalbumin do not show this enhancement. Because chitin oligomers like GlcNAc2 and GlcNAc3 partially block the activation, the 4-phenylbutylamine group is likely located near the lysozyme binding site.
