= 3,4-Dimethylmethcathinone =

Designer stimulant drug

Clinical data
- ATC code: none

Legal status
- Legal status: DE: Anlage II (Authorized trade only, not prescriptible); UK: Class B; US: Schedule I

Identifiers
- IUPAC name: (±)-1-(3,4-Dimethylphenyl)-2-(methylamino)propan-1-one
- CAS Number: 1082110-00-6
- PubChem CID: 52988261
- ChemSpider: 25630192
- UNII: C4EW58DTW5
- CompTox Dashboard (EPA): DTXSID501016968

Chemical and physical data
- Formula: C_{12}H_{17}NO
- Molar mass: 191.274 g·mol^{−1}
- 3D model (JSmol): Interactive image
- SMILES: Cc1ccc(C(=O)C(C)NC)cc1C
- InChI: InChI=1S/C12H17NO/c1-8-5-6-11(7-9(8)2)12(14)10(3)13-4/h5-7,10,13H,1-4H3; Key:IBZRXTVDTGVBIS-UHFFFAOYSA-N

3,4-Dimethylmethcathinone (3,4-DMMC) is a stimulant drug first reported in 2010 as a designer drug analogue of mephedrone, apparently produced in response to the banning of mephedrone, following its widespread abuse in many countries in Europe and around the world. 3,4-DMMC has been seized as a designer drug in Australia. In vitro, 3,4-DMMC was shown to be a monoamine transporter substrate that potently inhibits norepinephrine and serotonin reuptake, and to a lesser extent dopamine reuptake.

== Legal Status ==
As of October 2015 3,4-DMMC is a controlled substance in China.

3,4-DMMC is banned in the Czech Republic.

In the United States 3,4-DMMC is considered a Schedule I controlled substance as a positional isomer of 4-Methylethcathinone (4-MEC).

== See also ==
- Serotonin–norepinephrine–dopamine reuptake inhibitor
- Serotonin–norepinephrine reuptake inhibitor
- Substituted cathinone
- Indanylaminopropane
- Methylone
- Xylopropamine
