= N-Acetyl-3-MMC =

Precursor chemical to 3-Methylmethcathinone

Identifiers
- IUPAC name: N-Methyl-N-(1-oxo-1-(m-tolyl)propan-2-yl)acetamide
- PubChem CID: 165412098
- UNII: H5W57V67JL

Chemical and physical data
- Formula: C_{13}H_{17}NO_{2}
- Molar mass: 219.284 g·mol^{−1}
- 3D model (JSmol): Interactive image
- SMILES: CC(N(C)C(C)=O)C(=O)C1=CC=CC(C)=C1
- InChI: InChI=1S/C17H21N/c1-2-13-18-17(16-11-7-4-8-12-16)14-15-9-5-3-6-10-15/h3-12,17-18H,2,13-14H2,1H3; Key:IVWQIOZBRVXDRV-UHFFFAOYSA-N

N-Acetyl-3-methylmethcathinone is a compound which has been sold as a clanedestine precursor to the designer drug 3-methylmethcathinone (3-MMC). It is primarily produced to avoid local drug laws banning 3-MMC.

In 2019, Dutch police seized a shipment of 350 kilograms of N-acetyl-3-MMC bound for a Dutch clandestine production site. The shipment originated from India. It was found in jerrycans and barrels.

== See also ==
- 3-Methylmethcathinone
