= 3-Methylamphetamine =

Stimulant drug of the amphetamine class

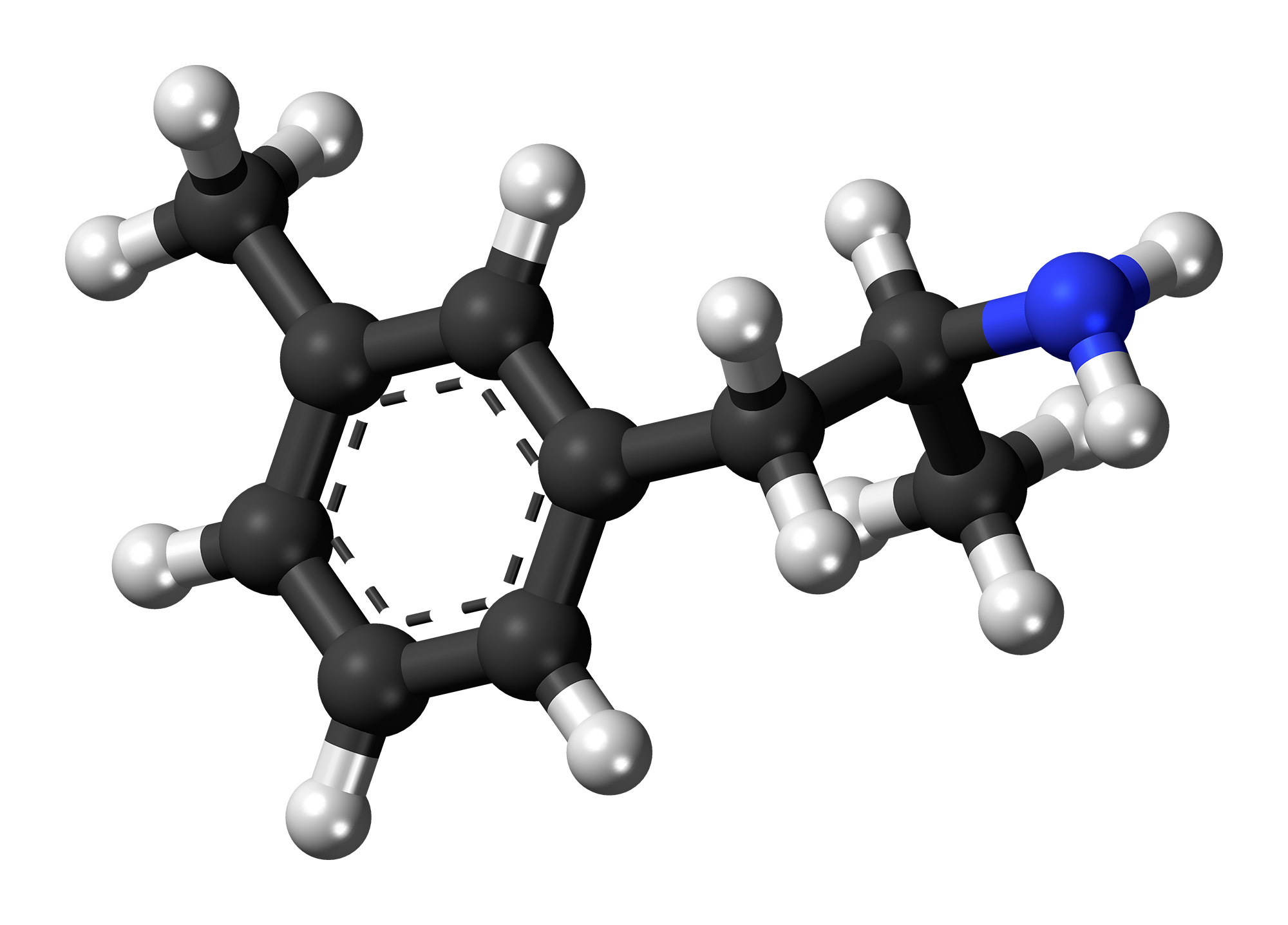

Clinical data
- Other names: 3-MeA; PAL-314; PAL314
- Drug class: Stimulant; Serotonin–norepinephrine–dopamine releasing agent

Legal status
- Legal status: DE: NpSG (Industrial and scientific use only); UK: Class A; US: Schedule II (isomer of Methamphetamine)

Identifiers
- IUPAC name: 1-(3-methylphenyl)propan-2-amine
- CAS Number: 77083-25-1
- PubChem CID: 115806
- ChemSpider: 103570
- UNII: EZH69QJQ4C
- CompTox Dashboard (EPA): DTXSID201017179 DTXSID70998349, DTXSID201017179

Chemical and physical data
- Formula: C_{10}H_{15}N
- Molar mass: 149.237 g·mol^{−1}
- 3D model (JSmol): Interactive image
- SMILES: c1ccc(C)cc1CC(C)N
- InChI: InChI=1S/C10H15N/c1-8-4-3-5-10(6-8)7-9(2)11/h3-6,9H,7,11H2,1-2H3; Key:KCTJOEASAHXBBW-UHFFFAOYSA-N

3-Methylamphetamine (3-MeA; code name PAL-314) is a stimulant drug from the amphetamine family. It is self-administered by mice to a similar extent to 4-fluoroamphetamine (4-FA) and has comparable properties as a monoamine releaser, although with a more balanced release of all three monoamines, as opposed to the more dopamine/noradrenaline-selective fluoro analogues.

== See also ==
- Substituted amphetamine
- 2-Methylamphetamine
- 3-Methylmethamphetamine
- 4-Methylamphetamine
- 3,4-Dimethylamphetamine
- 2,5-Dimethylamphetamine
- 3-Trifluoromethylamphetamine
