= Pentorex =

Chemical compound

Clinical data
- Trade names: Modatrop
- Other names: Phenpentermine; α,β-Dimethylamphetamine; β-Methylphentermine
- ATC code: none

Legal status
- Legal status: US: Schedule I (positional isomer of Etilamfetamine)

Identifiers
- IUPAC name: 2-methyl-3-phenylbutan-2-amine
- CAS Number: 434-43-5
- PubChem CID: 22031
- ChemSpider: 20703
- UNII: K97CJK0FXR
- CompTox Dashboard (EPA): DTXSID80861934
- ECHA InfoCard: 100.006.458

Chemical and physical data
- Formula: C_{11}H_{17}N
- Molar mass: 163.264 g·mol^{−1}
- 3D model (JSmol): Interactive image
- SMILES: CC(C1=CC=CC=C1)C(C)(C)N
- InChI: InChI=1S/C11H17N/c1-9(11(2,3)12)10-7-5-4-6-8-10/h4-9H,12H2,1-3H3; Key:UMWAUEZOGHNSCH-UHFFFAOYSA-N

Pentorex, also known as phenpentermine or α,β-dimethylamphetamine and sold under the brand name Modatrop, is a stimulant drug of the amphetamine family related to phentermine (α-methylamphetamine) which is used as an anorectic to assist with weight loss. It also acts as a diuretic. Pentorex was developed by Nordmark in the 1960s.

It is a derivative of 2-phenyl-3-aminobutane (β-methylamphetamine).

== See also ==
- α-Methylmethcathinone
