= Metaphedrine =

Designer drug

Clinical data
- Other names: 3-Methyl-N-methylamphetamine; 3-MMA; 3MMA; 3-Me-MA; Metaphedrine

Legal status
- Legal status: US: Schedule I (isomer of Etilamfetamime)

Identifiers
- IUPAC name: N-methyl-1-(3-methylphenyl)propan-2-amine
- CAS Number: 861007-68-3
- PubChem CID: 24257262
- ChemSpider: 23900070
- UNII: ANT66P7LWF
- CompTox Dashboard (EPA): DTXSID501343157

Chemical and physical data
- Formula: C_{11}H_{17}N
- Molar mass: 163.264 g·mol^{−1}
- 3D model (JSmol): Interactive image
- SMILES: CC1=CC(=CC=C1)CC(C)NC
- InChI: InChI=1S/C11H17N/c1-9-5-4-6-11(7-9)8-10(2)12-3/h4-7,10,12H,8H2,1-3H3; Key:CXVNKBVJDKMLOH-UHFFFAOYSA-N

Metaphedrine, or 3-methylmethamphetamine (3-MMA), is a methamphetamine derivative which has been sold as a designer drug, with the substance first encountered online in 2020 and reported in Sweden in 2021. It is a potent monoamine reuptake inhibitor and is thought to have psychostimulant effects. The drug was not active as a serotonin 5-HT_{2A} receptor agonist.

== See also ==
- Substituted amphetamine
- 3-Chloromethamphetamine
- 3-Methoxymethamphetamine
- 3-Methylamphetamine
- 3-Methylmethcathinone
- 3-Me-PVP
- 4-Methylmethamphetamine
- 2-Methylmethamphetamine
- Fenfluramine
- 3,4-Dimethylamphetamine
