= 2-Methylmethamphetamine =

Clinical data
- Other names: 2-MMA; 2-Me-MA; n-Methyl-1-(o-tolyl)propan-2-amine
- ATC code: None

Identifiers
- IUPAC name: N-methyl-1-(2-methylphenyl)propan-2-amine
- CAS Number: 861007-65-0
- PubChem CID: 20609794
- ChemSpider: 19293397

Chemical and physical data
- Formula: C_{11}H_{17}N
- Molar mass: 163.264 g·mol^{−1}
- 3D model (JSmol): Interactive image
- SMILES: CC1=CC=CC=C1CC(C)NC
- InChI: InChI=1S/C11H17N/c1-9-6-4-5-7-11(9)8-10(2)12-3/h4-7,10,12H,8H2,1-3H3; Key:IXEBWNOSEOYATJ-UHFFFAOYSA-N

2-Methylmethamphetamine (2-MMA) is a chemical compound of the phenethylamine and amphetamine families. It is the N-methyl derivative of ortetamine (2-methylamphetamine; 2-MA) and the 2-methyl derivative of methamphetamine. Closely related compounds, aside from the preceding, include 2-methylmethcathinone (2-MMC; ortomephedrone), 3-methylmethamphetamine (3-MMA), and 4-methylmethamphetamine (4-MMA). The chemical synthesis and analysis of 2-MMA have been described. It has the potential to emerge as a novel designer recreational drug with stimulant effects.

== See also ==
- Substituted amphetamine
