= 2,5-Dimethylamphetamine =

Clinical data
- Other names: 2,5-DMeA; 2,5-Dimethylphenylisopropylamine; α,2,5-Trimethylphenethylamine
- Routes of administration: Oral
- ATC code: None

Identifiers
- IUPAC name: SROXXLQATXNIKP-UHFFFAOYSA-N
- CAS Number: 19064-48-3
- PubChem CID: 115412
- ChemSpider: 103244
- UNII: 565QRS0R3J

Chemical and physical data
- Formula: C_{11}H_{17}N
- Molar mass: 163.264 g·mol^{−1}
- 3D model (JSmol): Interactive image
- SMILES: CC1=CC(=C(C=C1)C)CC(C)N
- InChI: InChI=1S/C11H17N/c1-8-4-5-9(2)11(6-8)7-10(3)12/h4-6,10H,7,12H2,1-3H3; Key:SROXXLQATXNIKP-UHFFFAOYSA-N

2,5-Dimethylamphetamine (2,5-DMeA) is a drug of the phenethylamine and amphetamine families which was studied as a potential appetite suppressant in the 1950s but was never marketed. It is the 2,5-dimethyl derivative of amphetamine and is an analogue of 2,5-dimethoxyamphetamine (2,5-DMA) and xylopropamine (3,4-dimethylamphetamine).

== Use and effects ==
In his book PiHKAL (Phenethylamines I Have Known and Loved) and other publications, Alexander Shulgin describes 2,5-DMeA as having little obvious in the way of cardiovascular or central effects at doses of up to 150 mg of the sulfate salt orally. On the other hand, in the The Shulgin Index, Volume One: Psychedelic Phenethylamines and Related Compounds, he describes the drug as being active at a dose of 50 mg orally and producing appetite suppression without side effects.

== Pharmacology ==
=== Pharmacodynamics ===
2,5-DMeA showed sympathomimetic effects with somewhat lower potency than amphetamine in dogs, whereas it was almost inactive in terms of stimulant-like effects in rodents.

== Chemistry ==
The chemical synthesis of 2,5-DMeA has been described. The N-methyl and N,N-dimethyl derivatives of the compound have also been described. Other analogues of 2,5-DMeA include ortetamine (2-methylamphetamine) and 3-methylamphetamine (5-methylamphetamine; PAL-314).

== History ==
2,5-DMeA was first described in the scientific literature by at least 1950.

== See also ==
- Substituted amphetamine
