= Metamfepramone =

Stimulant drug

Clinical data
- Other names: Dimepropion; Dimethylcathinone; Dimethylpropion; N,N-Dimethylcathinone; Rakefet
- Routes of administration: Oral
- Drug class: Stimulant; Appetite suppressant; Norepinephrine–dopamine releasing agent
- ATC code: None

Legal status
- Legal status: I-P(Poland)

Identifiers
- IUPAC name: (RS)-2-dimethylamino-1-phenylpropan-1-one
- CAS Number: 15351-09-4
- PubChem CID: 71872
- ChemSpider: 64889
- UNII: 04A0P12FH2
- CompTox Dashboard (EPA): DTXSID7057650
- ECHA InfoCard: 100.035.788

Chemical and physical data
- Formula: C_{11}H_{15}NO
- Molar mass: 177.247 g·mol^{−1}
- 3D model (JSmol): Interactive image
- SMILES: CC(C(=O)C1=CC=CC=C1)N(C)C
- InChI: InChI=1S/C11H15NO/c1-9(12(2)3)11(13)10-7-5-4-6-8-10/h4-9H,1-3H3; Key:KBHMHROOFHVLBA-UHFFFAOYSA-N

Metamfepramone (INN; also known as dimepropion (BAN), dimethylcathinone, and dimethylpropion) is a stimulant drug of the phenethylamine, and cathinone families. Dimethylcathinone was evaluated as an appetite suppressant and for the treatment of hypotension, but was never widely marketed. It was used as a recreational drug in Israel under the name rakefet, but was made illegal in 2006.

== Pharmacology ==
Metamfepramone is metabolized to produce N-methylpseudoephedrine and methcathinone. It has also been found to be about 1.6 times less potent than methcathinone, making it roughly equipotent to cathinone itself.

== Chemistry ==
A notable analogue of metamfepramone is dimethylamphetamine (N,N-dimethylamphetamine).

== Society and culture ==
=== Legal status ===
In the United States, metamfepramone is considered a Schedule I controlled substance as a positional isomer of mephedrone.

== See also ==
- Substituted cathinone
