= Ortetamine =

Stimulant drug of the amphetamine class

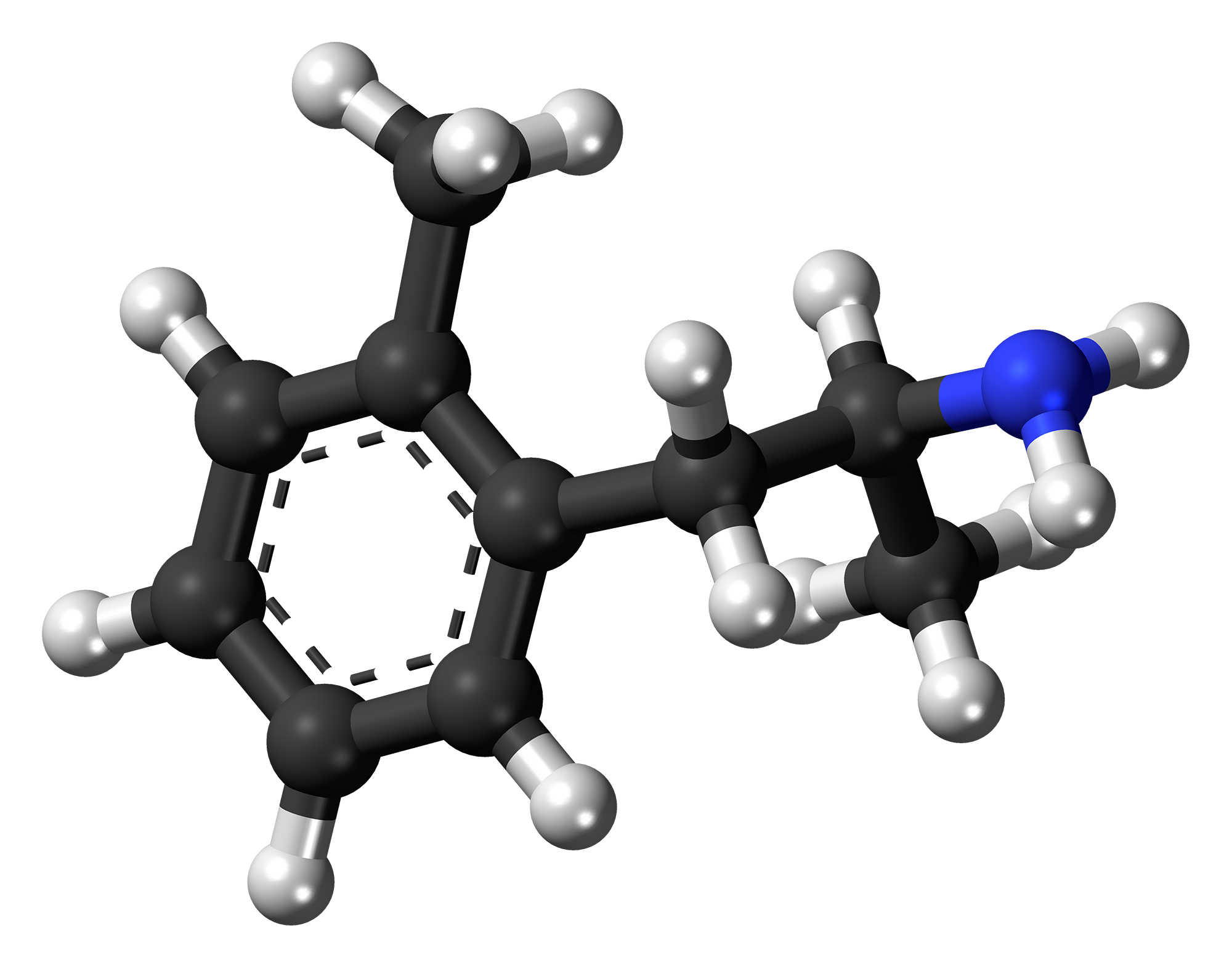

Clinical data
- Other names: Ortetamine, O-Tolylaminopropane
- Drug class: Stimulant
- ATC code: None

Legal status
- Legal status: DE: NpSG (Industrial and scientific use only); UK: Class A; US: Schedule II (isomer of Methamphetamine)

Identifiers
- IUPAC name: (±)-1-(2-methylphenyl)propan-2-amine
- CAS Number: 5580-32-5
- PubChem CID: 115808
- ChemSpider: 103572
- UNII: VF4N11KKKR
- ChEMBL: ChEMBL2105361
- CompTox Dashboard (EPA): DTXSID30863569

Chemical and physical data
- Formula: C_{10}H_{15}N
- Molar mass: 149.237 g·mol^{−1}
- 3D model (JSmol): Interactive image
- Chirality: Racemic mixture
- SMILES: NC(C)CC1=C(C)C=CC=C1
- InChI: InChI=1S/C10H15N/c1-8-5-3-4-6-10(8)7-9(2)11/h3-6,9H,7,11H2,1-2H3; Key:ZEMQBDFHXOOXLY-UHFFFAOYSA-N

Ortetamine (INN), also known as 2-methylamphetamine, is a stimulant drug of the amphetamine family. In animal drug discrimination tests it substituted for dextroamphetamine more closely than either 3- or 4-methylamphetamine, although with only around 1/10 the potency of dextroamphetamine itself.

== Society and culture ==
=== Legal status ===
Sweden's public health agency classified 2-MA as a narcotic substance, on January 18, 2019. Ortetamine is an isomer of Methamphetamine, therefore, a Schedule II Controlled Substance in the United States.

== See also ==
- Substituted amphetamine
- 2-Fluoroamphetamine
- 2-Methylmethamphetamine
- 2-Methylmethcathinone
- 2-Me-PVP
- 3-Methylamphetamine
- 4-Methylamphetamine
- 2-Methoxymethamphetamine
- 2,5-Dimethylamphetamine
