= 3-Methylmethcathinone =

Substituted cathinone designer drug

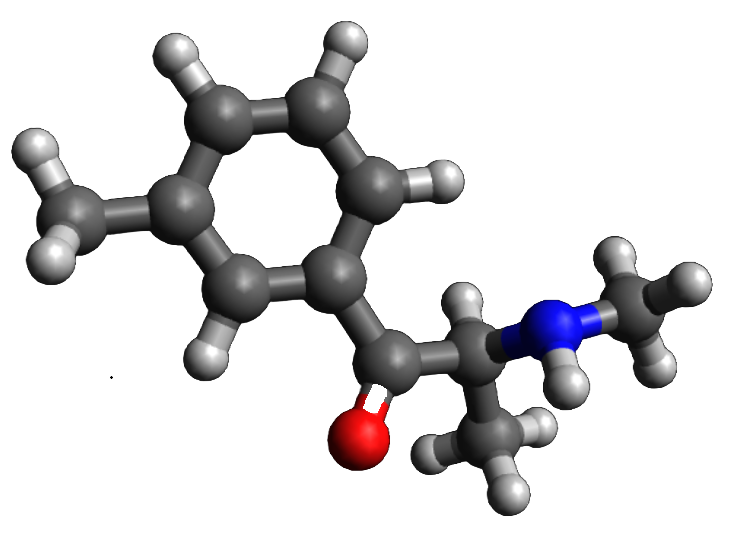

Clinical data
- Other names: 3-MMC; Metaphedrone; 3-Methyl-N-methylcathinone; 3,N-Dimethylcathinone; 3,N-Dimethyl-β-ketoamphetamine; 3,α,N-Trimethyl-β-ketophenethylamine
- Routes of administration: Oral; Insufflated (most common); Injected
- Drug class: Norepinephrine-dopamine reuptake inhibitor; Serotonin-norepinephrine-dopamine releasing agent; Stimulant
- ATC code: None

Legal status
- Legal status: BR: Class F2 (Prohibited psychotropics); DE: Anlage I (Authorized scientific use only); UK: Class B; US: Schedule I; UN: Psychotropic Schedule II

Pharmacokinetic data
- Bioavailability: Oral: 5–9%
- Protein binding: Low
- Elimination half-life: 50 min (in pigs)

Identifiers
- IUPAC name: 2-(Methylamino)-1-(3-methylphenyl)propan-1-one
- CAS Number: 1246911-86-3 1246816-62-5 (HCl)
- PubChem CID: 71741532
- ChemSpider: 34445939
- UNII: 73Q9QTO1N4
- KEGG: C22828
- CompTox Dashboard (EPA): DTXSID401043421

Chemical and physical data
- Formula: C_{11}H_{15}NO
- Molar mass: 177.247 g·mol^{−1}
- 3D model (JSmol): Interactive image
- Melting point: 193.2 °C (379.8 °F) ± 0.2°C (hydrochloride salt)
- Boiling point: 280.5 °C (536.9 °F) ± 23.0°C at 760 mm Hg
- Solubility in water: Sparingly soluble in PBS; slightly soluble in ethanol, dimethyl sulfoxide, and dimethyl formamide. mg/mL (20 °C)
- SMILES: CC1=CC=CC(C(C(C)NC)=O)=C1
- InChI: InChI=1S/C11H15NO/c1-8-5-4-6-10(7-8)11(13)9(2)12-3/h4-7,9,12H,1-3H3; Key:QDNXSIYWHYGMCD-UHFFFAOYSA-N

3-Methylmethcathinone (3-MMC), also known as metaphedrone, is a designer drug from the substituted cathinone family. It is a stimulant drug that acts as a monoamine transporter substrate (a substance acted upon by monoamine transporters in the brain) that potently releases and inhibits the reuptake of dopamine and norepinephrine, as well as displaying moderate serotonin releasing activity.

3-Methylmethcathinone is a structural isomer of mephedrone (4-methylmethcathinone), and as such is illegal via blanket bans in many countries that have banned mephedrone. However, 3-MMC has still appeared on the recreational drug market as an alternative to mephedrone, and was first identified being sold in Sweden in 2012. Unlike some other synthetic cathinones, 3-MMC has been evaluated in at least one human and large mammal study.

== Use and effects ==
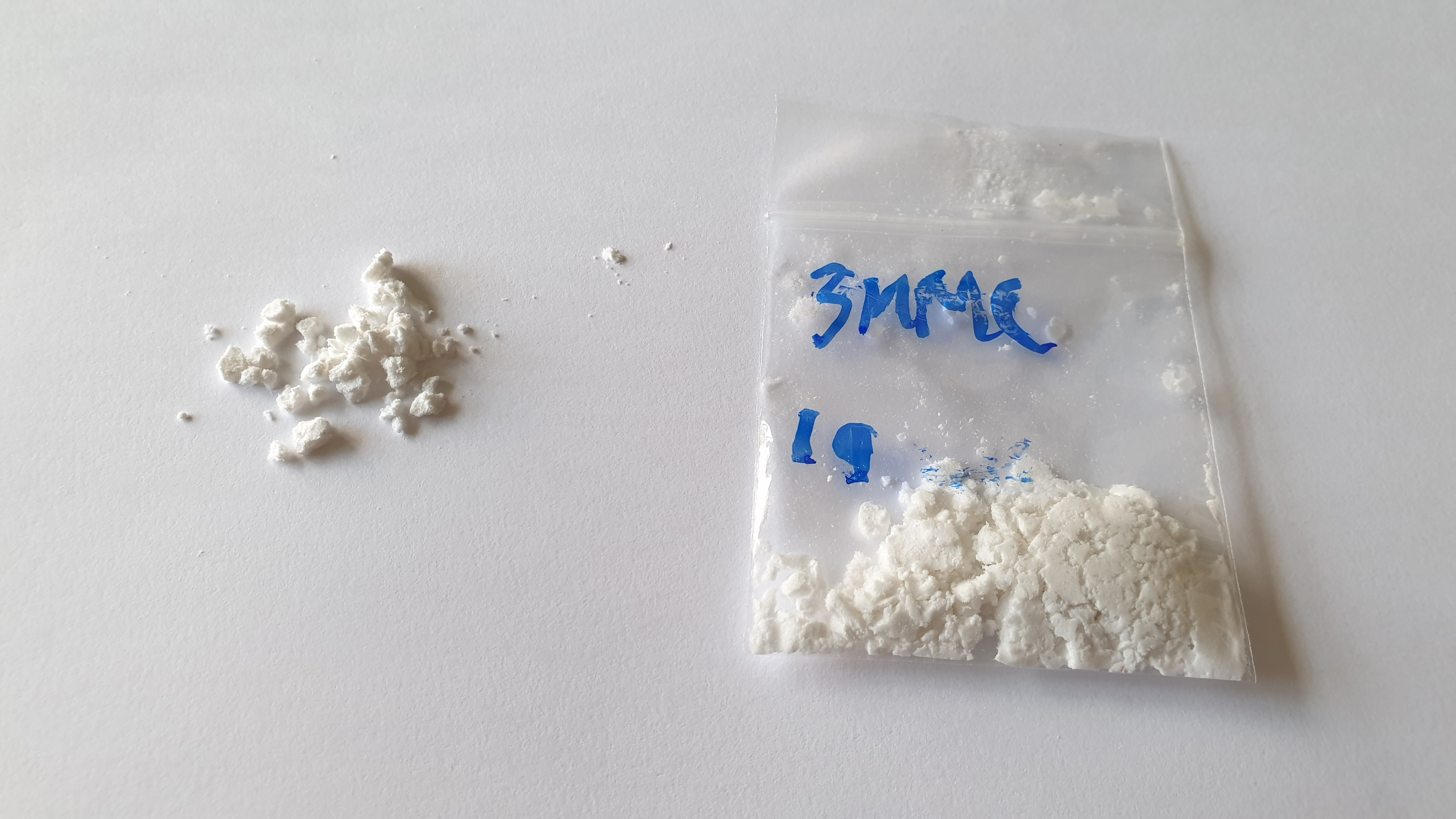
3-MMC as prepared for recreational use.

As with mephedrone, users of 3-MMC typically report effects such as an elevated mood, pleasant body sensations, feelings of love and empathy, euphoria, greater appreciation of music, heightened libido, and increased confidence and sociability.

Adverse effects range from aggression, dry mouth, and jaw clenching, to more serious effects such as hyponatremia, seizures, hyperthermia and rhabdomyolysis.

Due to its fleeting duration and dopaminergic effects, 3-MMC is highly addictive and commonly abused. Repeated dosing within a sitting is typical, sometimes using different routes, primarily oral and intranasal. Common self-reported doses range from 50 to 150 mg (when insufflated), and up to single 500 mg doses. Intranasal administration, or snorting, is the most common route of administration, followed by oral administration, followed by other routes, such as rectal administration and injection into the bloodstream.

Users may dose repeatedly in order to extend the drugs duration, leading to 0.5—2 gram "sessions" that can span an evening. Single-dose effects last from 30 to 60 minutes, typically peaking around 10-minutes post-dose. In a questionnaire-based study of self-reported 3-MMC users in Slovenia, it was found that 88% of users insufflated the drug while 42% took it orally. The study did not find any instances of users injecting 3-MMC. Moreover, 26% of the users reported taking more than 1.5 grams of 3-MMC in a single sitting and over 50% reported having consumed more than 0.5 grams in a single sitting.

3-Methylmethcathinone is commonly encountered as a white/off-white crystalline or pasty solid. It can be found sold in capsules. It is assumed to be a racemic mixture like mephedrone.

== Adverse effects ==
Side effects of 3-MMC include increased heart rate, increased blood pressure, and decreased appetite.

=== Toxicity ===
A total of 27 fatalities with at least some exposure to 3-MMC have been confirmed as of March 2022. Eighteen of the 27 reported fatalities involved multiple drugs of abuse, usually opioids and uppers ("speedballs"). Of the 13 cases that specified sex, 12 deaths were male and 1 death was female. Of the 7 males whose age was reported, the median age was 27. The fatalities see a wide range of blood concentrations, from 249 to 1600 ng/mL. The route of administration in any of these fatalities is not clear.

Of the presumably nine monointoxication deaths involving only 3-MMC that have occurred, two monointoxication cases were reported in the Netherlands and one was reported in France. The death in France was determined to be an accidental overdose. In addition, there has been 291 reported cases of non-fatal 3-MMC intoxications. 213 of these cases (75%) were reported in Poland alone, and 50 cases (17%) were reported in Sweden.

The toxicokinetics of 3-MMC are thought to be similar to those for mephedrone. The first human study conducted in 14 healthy human volunteers concluded that "...low to moderate doses of 3-MMC were well tolerated and safe and that potential health risks might only occur at high or excessive doses of 3-MMC."

== Pharmacology ==
=== Pharmacodynamics ===
3-MMC potently inhibits the reuptake of monoamines in the human norepinephrine (NET) and dopamine (DAT) transporters. It also acts as a triple releasing agent of dopamine, serotonin, and norepinephrine, similar to many other cathinones. As a releasing agent, it is more selective for dopamine and especially norepinephrine, suggesting that it has stronger amphetamine-like stimulant properties compared to mephedrone or MDMA.

3-MMC binds to serotonin 5-HT1A, 5-HT2A, and 5-HT2C receptors, although it is unknown what impact this activity has on the effects of the drug. It also binds to adrenergic α1A (K_{i}: 7.9 μM) and α2A (K_{i}: 1.1 μM) receptors, which influences its stimulant effects and may contribute to its analgesic effect shared with cathinone. It binds much more strongly to the adrenergic receptors than the serotonergic 5-HT receptors, although it still retains significant serotonin releasing activity (292 nM in one study). Other receptor interaction data have also been reported. In contrast to mephedrone, it is inactive as a serotonin 5-HT_{2A} receptor agonist.

3-MMC is also inactive as an agonist of the rat and human TAAR1 (EC_{50} = >10,000 nM). Conversely, it is a low-potency weak partial agonist of the mouse TAAR1 (EC_{50} = 3,800 nM, E_{max} = 25%).

Activity of 3-MMC at monoamine transporters [nM]
Potency	DAT	NET	SERT
EC_{50}	70	27	292
IC_{50}	270	80	4500

=== Pharmacokinetics ===
The oral bioavailability of 3-methylmethcathinone was determined at 7% in one pig study, with peak blood concentrations (T_{max}) attained within 5 to 10 minutes, and a relatively short half-life of 50 minutes. Concentration in blood plasma dropped below detectability 24 hours after oral ingestion. Decreased feeding behavior resulted in weight loss for some.

The metabolism of 3-MMC is not well-described. Known metabolites include 3-methylephedrine and 3-methylnorephedrine. A possible metabolic pathway is β-keto-reduction followed by N-demethylation.

== Chemistry ==
3-MMC's IUPAC name is 2-(methylamino)-1-(3-methylphenyl)propan-1-one). It is one of many synthetic cathinones, designer drugs related to amphetamines. It can be seen as the β-keto analog of 3-methylmethamphetamine

3-MMC contains a chiral center at the C-2 carbon. Therefore, two enantiomers exist, the R and S enantiomer. It is assumed that the S form is more potent due to its similarity to cathinone, but further research is needed to confirm this.

=== Synthesis ===
There are several ways to synthesize 3-MMC. One route adapted from Power et al. is to add ethylmagnesium bromide to 3-methylbenzaldehyde (I) to form the product 1-(3-methylphenyl)-1-propanol (II). This product is then oxidized by pyridinium chlorochromate (PCC) on silica gel to the ketone (III) and brominated with hydrobromic acid to yield the bromoketone (IV). This bromoketone is reacted with ethanolic methylamine to produce the 3-MMC free base (V), which can be converted to the hydrochloride salt (VI) by addition of ethereal hydrogen chloride (VI).

One possible synthesis, starting from 3-methylbenzaldehyde

=== Analogues ===
Analogues of 3-MMC include 3-methylmethamphetamine (3-MMA), mephedrone (4-MMC; 4-methylmethcathinone), 3-fluoromethcathinone (3-FMC), 3-chloromethcathinone (3-CMC), 3-bromomethcathinone (3-BMC), and N-acetyl-3-MMC, among others.

== History ==
3-MMC was first encountered in Sweden in 2012; it was created as a designer drug following the control in many countries of the related compound mephedrone. It was sold as a research chemical, usually in powdered form. There is no known or reported medical use of 3-MMC; it is primarily used recreationally.

== Society and culture ==
=== Use in France ===
In France, 3-MMC has gained popularity as a club drug since at least 2020, first within the gay scene and then in the Paris nightclub scene. It is called 'poor man's cocaine' (cocaïne du pauvre) because of its cheap price, less than €10 per gram compared to €70-80 for a gram of cocaine. For this reason and others, it has become popular in other European countries as well.

=== Legal status ===
In the United States, 3-MMC is illegal as a positional isomer of the controlled substance mephedrone. Furthermore, it was explicitly designated as a controlled substance itself on 13 December 2023.

Since October 2015, 3-MMC is a controlled substance in China.

3-MMC is banned in the Czech Republic.

3-MMC was not banned in 2016 by the United Nations Office on Drugs and Crime (UNODC) after a critical review. However, following its subsequent abuse beginning in 2019, this decision was overturned and it was placed into schedule II of the 1971 convention in March 2023.

Effective 28 October 2021, 3-MMC has been scheduled under the Dutch Opium Law and is therefore illegal in the Netherlands.

3-MMC was given narcotic status in India on 8 February 2024.

== Research ==
3-MMC is under development for use as a pharmaceutical drug in the potential treatment of dyskinesias. As of August 2023, it is in preclinical research for this indication. The drug is being developed by Clearmind Medicine.

3-MMC is currently being developed as a medicine by the American biotech company MindMed. They have filed for a patent to use 3-MMC for problems such as social anxiety disorder, post-traumatic stress disorder (PTSD), and as an adjunct in couples therapy.

3-MMC is also undergoing clinical trials for its use in treating menstrual symptoms. A successful trial has been completed in the University of Maastricht. These efforts are led by the small Dutch company Period Pill. The company has filed for patent coverage in Canada, Mexico, Croatia, the United States, Morocco, Japan, Brazil, Poland, Hungary, and Korea.

The first in-human clinical study of 3-MMC was published in December 2024.

== See also ==
- Substituted cathinone
- List of designer drugs
- List of investigational hallucinogens and entactogens
- 2-Methylmethcathinone
- 3-Chloromethcathinone
