= Α-Methylmethcathinone =

α-Methylmethcathinone

Clinical data
- Other names: α,N-Dimethylcathinone; β-Keto-N-methylphentermine; β-Keto-α,N-dimethylamphetamine; β-Keto-α,α,N-trimethylphenethylamine; α-Methylmethcathinone; α-Me-MC; βk-Mephentermine; RAD-081; RAD081
- Drug class: Norepinephrine–dopamine releasing agent

Identifiers
- IUPAC name: 2-methyl-2-(methylamino)-1-phenylpropan-1-one
- CAS Number: 1011-07-0
- PubChem CID: 22163342

Chemical and physical data
- Formula: C_{11}H_{15}NO
- Molar mass: 177.247 g·mol^{−1}
- 3D model (JSmol): Interactive image
- SMILES: CC(C)(C(=O)C1=CC=CC=C1)NC
- InChI: InChI=1S/C11H15NO/c1-11(2,12-3)10(13)9-7-5-4-6-8-9/h4-8,12H,1-3H3; Key:JLVGGPQTLAPRPH-UHFFFAOYSA-N

α-Methylmethcathinone (α-Me-MC), also known as βk-mephentermine or as RAD-081, is a norepinephrine–dopamine releasing agent (NDRA) of the amphetamine, cathinone, and phentermine families. It is the α-methyl analogue of methcathinone and the β-keto analogue of mephentermine. The drug's EC_{50} values for induction of monoamine release are 153 nM for norepinephrine, 590 nM for dopamine, and 12,860 nM for serotonin in rat brain synaptosomes. α-Methylmethcathinone was first described in the scientific literature by 2019.

== See also ==
- Substituted cathinone
- Pentorex
