= 3,4,5-Trimethylphenethylamine =

Clinical data
- Other names: TMePEA; 3,4,5-tris-Desoxymescaline; 2-(3,4,5-Trimethylphenyl)ethanamine; Desoxymescaline; 3,4,5-Trideoxymescaline
- ATC code: None

Identifiers
- IUPAC name: 2-(3,4,5-trimethylphenyl)ethanamine
- CAS Number: 76935-66-5
- PubChem CID: 58568395
- ChemSpider: 60758650
- CompTox Dashboard (EPA): DTXSID401302819

Chemical and physical data
- Formula: C_{11}H_{17}N
- Molar mass: 163.264 g·mol^{−1}
- 3D model (JSmol): Interactive image
- SMILES: CC1=CC(=CC(=C1C)C)CCN
- InChI: InChI=1S/C11H17N/c1-8-6-11(4-5-12)7-9(2)10(8)3/h6-7H,4-5,12H2,1-3H3; Key:KAUIOBNOAIVCQQ-UHFFFAOYSA-N

3,4,5-Trimethylphenethylamine (also known as TMePEA and 3,4,5-tris-desoxymescaline) is a chemical compound of the phenethylamine family. It is the analogue of mescaline (3,4,5-trimethoxyphenethylamine) in which all three methoxy groups on the phenyl ring have been replaced with methyl groups. The behavioral effects of TMePEA in cats have been studied. In contrast to mescaline, TMePEA and other analogues have rage-inducing effects in cats. The human psychoactivity of TMePEA is unknown. The compound was described in Alexander Shulgin's The Shulgin Index, Volume One: Psychedelic Phenethylamines and Related Compounds (2011).

== See also ==
- Scaline
- 3,4-Dimethylphenethylamine (DMePEA)
