= Xylopropamine =

Stimulant drug of the phenethylamine and amphetamine classes

Clinical data
- Trade names: Perhedrin, Esanin
- Other names: 3,4-Dimethylamphetamine; DMeA
- Routes of administration: Oral
- Drug class: Stimulant; Appetite suppressant
- ATC code: None

Legal status
- Legal status: CA: Schedule I; UK: Class B; US: Schedule I (positional isomer of etilamfetamine); In general: ℞ (Prescription only)

Identifiers
- IUPAC name: (±)-1-(3,4-dimethylphenyl)propan-2-amine
- CAS Number: 102-31-8; Sulfate: 14543-76-1
- PubChem CID: 26727
- ChemSpider: 24901
- UNII: 4DB10V9J2I; Sulfate: B464QNG39U
- CompTox Dashboard (EPA): DTXSID70904041

Chemical and physical data
- Formula: C_{11}H_{17}N
- Molar mass: 163.264 g·mol^{−1}
- 3D model (JSmol): Interactive image
- Chirality: Racemic mixture
- SMILES: c1c(ccc(c1C)C)CC(N)C
- InChI: InChI=1S/C11H17N/c1-8-4-5-11(6-9(8)2)7-10(3)12/h4-6,10H,7,12H2,1-3H3; Key:ZSZUWPRERIPUBM-UHFFFAOYSA-N

Xylopropamine, also known as 3,4-dimethylamphetamine (DMeA) and sold under the brand names Perhedrin and Esanin, is a stimulant and sympathomimetic drug of the phenethylamine and amphetamine families which was developed and marketed as an appetite suppressant in the 1950s. It was briefly sold as the sulfate salt, but it was not widely marketed.

== Use and effects ==
It produces cardiovascular effects at a dose of 100 mg orally and toxic effects such as nausea and vomiting at a dose of 150 mg orally. In contrast to certain analogues like 3,4-dimethoxyamphetamine (3,4-DMA), xylopropamine does not produced psychedelic effects.

== Pharmacology ==
=== Pharmacodynamics ===
Xylopropamine was also reported as having analgesic and anti-inflammatory effects but its side effect profile resulted in it never being further developed for these applications.

== See also ==
- Substituted amphetamine
- Methamphetamine
- Dimethylamphetamine
- 2,5-Dimethylamphetamine
- 3,4-Dimethylphenethylamine
- 3,4-Dimethylmethcathinone
- 3,4-Difluoroamphetamine
- 4-Methylamphetamine
- 4-Methylmethamphetamine
- Indanylaminopropane
