= N-Methylphenethylamine =

Trace amine

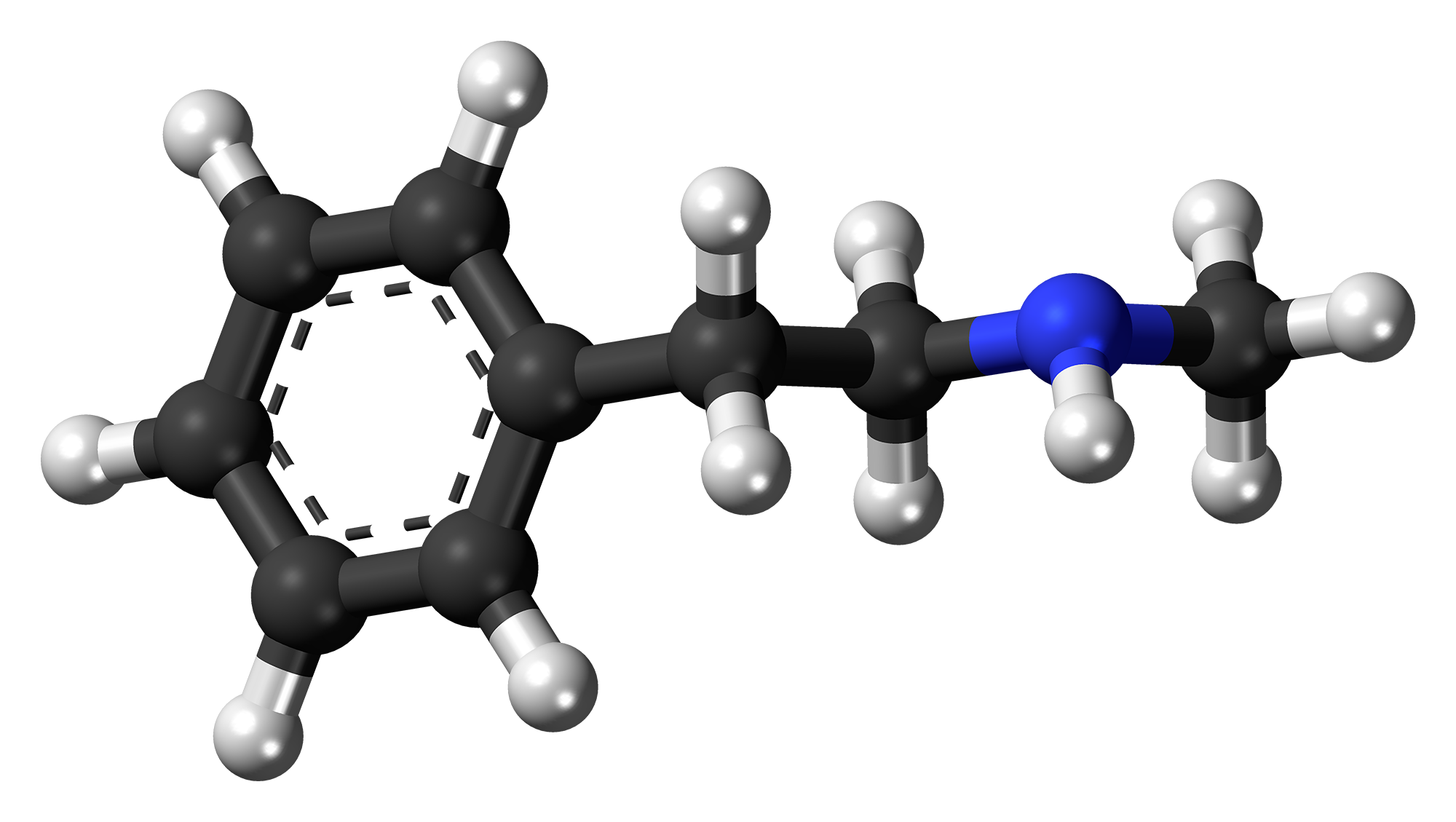

Clinical data
- Other names: NMPEA; N-Methyl-2-phenylethanamine; N-Methylphenethylamine; N-Methyl-β-phenethylamine

Legal status
- Legal status: CA: Schedule 1 as an isomer of amphetamine

Identifiers
- IUPAC name: N-methyl-2-phenylethan-1-amine
- CAS Number: 589-08-2
- PubChem CID: 11503
- ChemSpider: 11019
- UNII: 02N4V81704
- ChEMBL: ChEMBL45763
- CompTox Dashboard (EPA): DTXSID10207629
- ECHA InfoCard: 100.008.758

Chemical and physical data
- Formula: C_{9}H_{13}N
- Molar mass: 135.210 g·mol^{−1}
- 3D model (JSmol): Interactive image
- Density: 0.93 g/cm^{3}
- Boiling point: 203 °C (397 °F)
- SMILES: CNCCc1ccccc1
- InChI: InChI=1S/C9H13N/c1-10-8-7-9-5-3-2-4-6-9/h2-6,10H,7-8H2,1H3; Key:SASNBVQSOZSTPD-UHFFFAOYSA-N

N-Methylphenethylamine (NMPEA) is a naturally occurring trace amine neuromodulator in humans that is derived from the trace amine, phenethylamine (PEA). It has been detected in human urine (<1 μg over 24 hours) and is produced by phenylethanolamine N-methyltransferase with phenethylamine as a substrate, which significantly increases PEA's effects. PEA breaks down into phenylacetaldehyde which is further broken down into phenylacetic acid by monoamine oxidase. When this is inhibited by monoamine oxidase inhibitors, it allows more of the PEA to remain present and produce psychoactive effects.

PEA and NMPEA are both alkaloids that are found in a number of different plant species as well. Some Acacia species, such as A. rigidula, contain remarkably high levels of NMPEA (~2300–5300 ppm). NMPEA is also present at low concentrations (< 10 ppm) in a wide range of foodstuffs.

NMPEA is a positional isomer of amphetamine.

== Biosynthesis ==
Biosynthetic pathways for catecholamines and trace amines in the human brain
N-methylphenethylamine, an endogenous compound in humans, is an isomer of amphetamine with the same biomolecular target, TAAR1, a G protein-coupled receptor which modulates catecholamine neurotransmission.

== Chemistry ==
In appearance, NMPEA is a colorless liquid. NMPEA is a weak base, with pK_{a} = 10.14; pK_{b} = 3.86 (calculated from data given as K_{b}). It forms a hydrochloride salt, m.p. 162–164 °C.

Although NMPEA is available commercially, it may be synthesized by various methods. An early synthesis reported by Carothers and co-workers involved conversion of phenethylamine to its p-toluenesulfonamide, followed by N-methylation using methyl iodide, then hydrolysis of the sulfonamide. A more recent method, similar in principle, and used for making NMPEA radio-labeled with ^{14}C in the N-methyl group, started with the conversion of phenethylamine to its trifluoroacetamide. This was N-methylated (in this particular case using ^{14}C – labeled methyl iodide), and then the amide hydrolyzed.

NMPEA is a substrate for both MAO-A (K_{M} = 58.8 μM) and MAO-B (K_{M} = 4.13 μM) from rat brain mitochondria.

== Pharmacology ==
NMPEA is a pressor, with 1/350 x the potency of epinephrine.

Like its parent compound, PEA, and isomer, amphetamine, NMPEA is a potent agonist of human trace amine-associated receptor 1 (TAAR1). It has comparable pharmacodynamic and toxicodynamic properties to that of phenethylamine, amphetamine, and other methylphenethylamines in rats.

As with PEA, NMPEA is metabolized relatively rapidly by monoamine oxidases during first pass metabolism; both compounds are preferentially metabolized by MAO-B.

=== Toxicology ===
The "minimum lethal dose" (mouse, i.p.) of the HCl salt of NMPEA is 203 mg/kg; the LD_{50} for oral administration to mice of the same salt is 685 mg/kg.

Acute toxicity studies on NMPEA show an LD_{50} = 90 mg/kg, after intravenous administration to mice.
