= Β-Methylphenethylamine =

Chemical compound

β-Methylphenethylamine

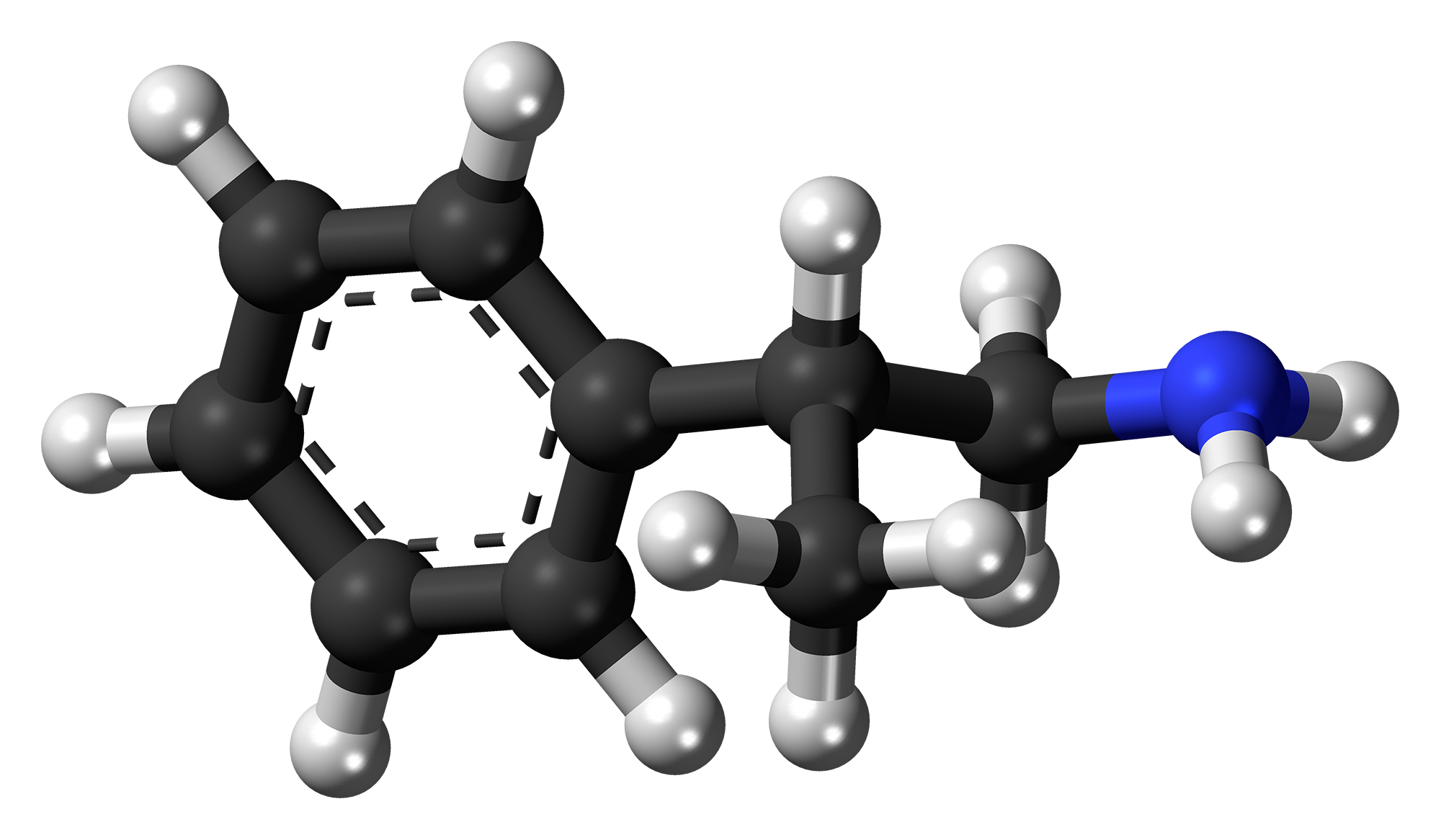

Clinical data
- ATC code: none

Legal status
- Legal status: US: Unapproved "New Drug" (as defined by 21 U.S. Code § 321(p)(1)). Use in dietary supplements, food, or medicine is unlawful; otherwise uncontrolled.

Identifiers
- IUPAC name: 2-Phenylpropan-1-amine
- CAS Number: 582-22-9
- PubChem CID: 11398
- ChemSpider: 10920
- UNII: 6XL7O3V13L
- ChEBI: CHEBI:229522
- ChEMBL: ChEMBL158578
- CompTox Dashboard (EPA): DTXSID10870630
- ECHA InfoCard: 100.008.619

Chemical and physical data
- Formula: C_{9}H_{13}N
- Molar mass: 135.210 g·mol^{−1}
- 3D model (JSmol): Interactive image
- Density: 0.93 g/cm^{3}
- Boiling point: 80 °C (176 °F) (at 10 mm Hg)
- SMILES: NCC(c1ccccc1)C
- InChI: InChI=1S/C9H13N/c1-8(7-10)9-5-3-2-4-6-9/h2-6,8H,7,10H2,1H3; Key:AXORVIZLPOGIRG-UHFFFAOYSA-N

β-Methylphenethylamine (β-Me-PEA, BMPEA, or 1-amino-2-phenylpropane) is an organic compound of the phenethylamine class, and a positional isomer of the drug amphetamine, with which it shares some properties. In particular, both amphetamine and β-methylphenethylamine are human TAAR1 agonists. In appearance, it is a colorless or yellowish liquid.

Relatively little information has been published about this substance. Hartung and Munch reported that it had good antihypotensive (pressor) activity in experimental animals, and that it was orally active. The MLD (minimum lethal dose) for the HCl salt was given as 500 mg/kg (rat, s.c.) and 50 mg/kg (rabbit, i.v.).

A study by Graham and co-workers at the Upjohn Co., comparing many β-methylphenethylamines substituted on the benzene ring showed that β-methylphenethylamine itself had 1/700 x the pressor activity of epinephrine, corresponding to ~ 1/3 the potency of amphetamine. The β-methyl compound also had ~ 2 x the broncho-dilating power of amphetamine (as measured using the isolated rabbit lung), and an LD_{50} of 50 mg/kg (rat, i.v.).

== Synthesis ==
β-Methylphenethylamine can be made by the catalytic hydrogenation of 2-phenylpropionitrile with Pd/C in pure anhydrous ethanol containing three equivalents of HCl; the finished product is extracted as the HCl salt, m.p. 123-124°.

== Presence ==
In 2015, 52% of supplements labeled as containing Acacia rigidula were found to contain BMPEA. Consumers following recommended maximum daily servings would consume a maximum of 94 mg of BMPEA per day. In 2012, however, the FDA determined that BMPEA was not naturally present in Acacia rigidula leaves. This question was litigated during the trial of Hi Tech Pharmaceuticals Inc vs. Cohen. Despite US Food and Drug Administration warning letters, BMPEA remains present in dietary supplements.

== Safety ==
β-Methylphenethylamine was associated with a case of cerebral hemorrhage in a Swedish athlete and first time user. The female victim with no medical history had taken a Swedish food supplement with 290 mg β-methylphenethylamine per serving before commencing her usual exercises. After about 30 minutes the first symptoms appeared. The presence of the active ingredient was not declared on the label. Use of β-Methylphenethylamine is also prohibited in sports.

== See also ==
- Amphetamine
- β-Methylamphetamine
- Phenethylamine
- Phenpromethamine (N-methyl-β-methylphenethylamine)
- β,N,N-Trimethylphenethylamine
- Phenylpropylamine
