= 2-Phenyl-3-aminobutane =

Chemical compound

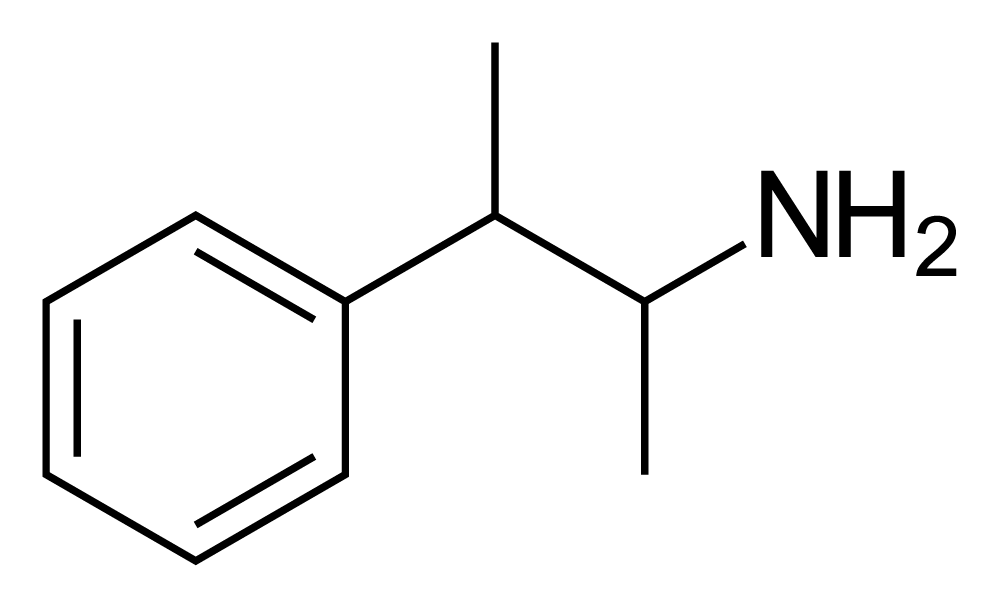

Clinical data
- Other names: β-Methylamphetamine; α,β-Dimethylphenethylamine; α,β-Dimethyl-2-phenylethylamine

Legal status
- Legal status: CA: Schedule 1; US: Schedule II (isomer of Methamphetamine)

Identifiers
- IUPAC name: 3-Phenylbutan-2-amine
- CAS Number: 21906-17-2
- PubChem CID: 210912
- ChemSpider: 182828
- CompTox Dashboard (EPA): DTXSID50944501

Chemical and physical data
- Formula: C_{10}H_{15}N
- Molar mass: 149.237 g·mol^{−1}
- 3D model (JSmol): Interactive image
- SMILES: C1(=CC=CC=C1)C(C)C(C)N
- InChI: InChI=1/C10H15N/c1-8(9(2)11)10-6-4-3-5-7-10/h3-9H,11H2,1-2H3; Key:BKRHEVJTTWAYFJ-UHFFFAOYSA-N

2-Phenyl-3-aminobutane (also known as β-methylamphetamine) is a stimulant of the phenethylamine class that is closely related to its α-methyl analog Pentorex. It was first synthesized by the German scientists Felix Haffner and Fritz Sommer in 1939 as a stimulant with milder effects, shorter duration, lower toxicity and fewer side effects compared to previously known drugs such as amphetamine.

2-Phenyl-3-aminobutane is banned in some countries as a structural isomer of methamphetamine.

== See also ==
- β-Methylphenethylamine
- β-Phenylmethamphetamine
- Phentermine
