= Dimethylamphetamine =

Chemical compound

Dimethylamphetamine INN: Dimetamfetamine

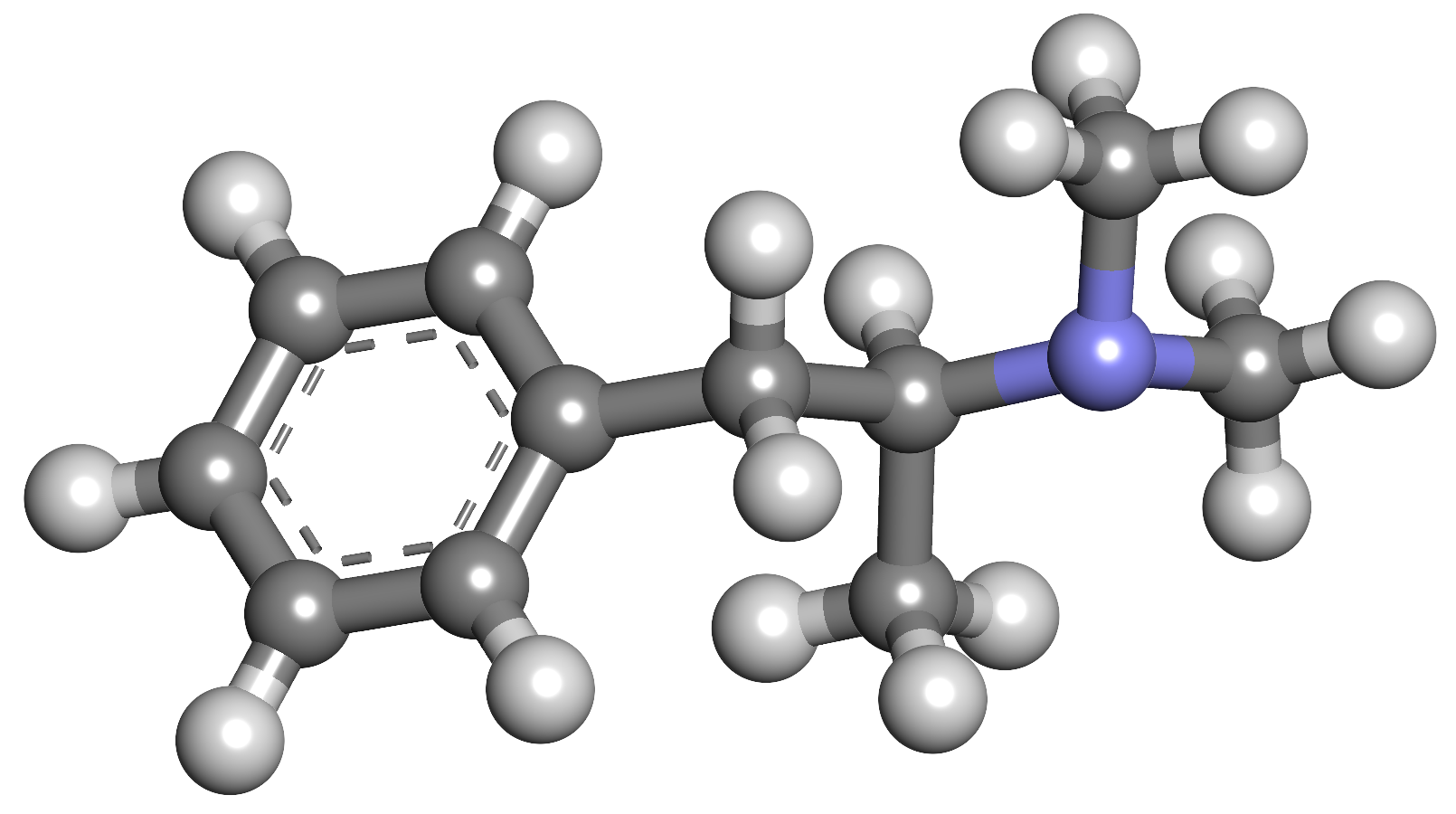

Clinical data
- Routes of administration: Oral
- ATC code: none

Legal status
- Legal status: AU: S9 (Prohibited substance); US: Schedule I

Identifiers
- IUPAC name: N,N-dimethyl-1-phenylpropan-2-amine
- CAS Number: 4075-96-1
- PubChem CID: 20006
- ChemSpider: 18847
- UNII: IYE3F3MHCU
- KEGG: C22825
- CompTox Dashboard (EPA): DTXSID40860201

Chemical and physical data
- Formula: C_{11}H_{17}N
- Molar mass: 163.264 g·mol^{−1}
- 3D model (JSmol): Interactive image
- SMILES: CC(N(C)C)CC1=CC=CC=C1
- InChI: InChI=1S/C11H17N/c1-10(12(2)3)9-11-7-5-4-6-8-11/h4-8,10H,9H2,1-3H3; Key:OBDSVYOSYSKVMX-UHFFFAOYSA-N

Dimethylamphetamine (Metrotonin), also known as dimetamfetamine (INN), dimephenopan and N,N-dimethylamphetamine, is a stimulant drug of the phenethylamine and amphetamine chemical classes. Dimethylamphetamine has weaker stimulant effects than amphetamine or methamphetamine and is considerably less addictive and less neurotoxic compared to methamphetamine. However, it still retains some mild stimulant effects and abuse potential, and is illegal in both the United States and Australia.

Dimethylamphetamine has occasionally been found in illicit methamphetamine laboratories, but is usually an impurity rather than the desired product. It may be produced by accident when methamphetamine is synthesised by N-methylation of dextroamphetamine if the reaction temperature is too high or an excess of methylating agent is used.

It is said to be a prodrug of methamphetamine and amphetamine, which are minor metabolites.

== See also ==
- Substituted amphetamine
