= Phenylethylpyrrolidine =

Names
- Preferred IUPAC name 1-(2-Phenylethyl)pyrrolidine

Identifiers
CAS Number	6273-83-2
3D model (JSmol)	Interactive image
ChemSpider	364511
PubChem CID	411735
CompTox Dashboard (EPA)	DTXSID701029426
- InChI: InChI=1S/C12H17N/c1-2-6-12(7-3-1)8-11-13-9-4-5-10-13/h1-3,6-7H,4-5,8-11H2
- SMILES: c1c(cccc1)CCN2CCCC2

Properties
Chemical formula	C_{12}H_{17}N
Molar mass	175.275 g·mol^{−1}
- Except where otherwise noted, data are given for materials in their standard state (at 25 °C [77 °F], 100 kPa). Infobox references

1-(2-Phenylethyl)pyrrolidine (PEP) is a chemical compound of the phenethylamine family. It is an analogue of 2-phenylethylamine where the amine has been replaced by a pyrrolidine ring.

== Derivatives ==
The α-methyl (i.e., amphetamine derivative is 1-(α-methylphenethyl)pyrrolidine (MPEP), the β-keto derivative is phenacylpyrrolidine, and the combined α-methyl and β-keto (i.e., cathinone) derivative is α-pyrrolidinopropiophenone (α-PPP). Prolintane is the α-propyl derivative of PEP.

PEP is the base chemical structure for a series of stimulant drugs, including:

- α-PBP
- α-PHP
- α-PHPP
- α-POP
- α-PPP
- α-PVP
- MDPBP
- MDPPP
- MDPV
- MOPPP
- MPBP
- MPHP
- MPPP
- Naphyrone
- Prolintane
- Pyrovalerone
- TH-PVP

All of these compounds differ from PEP in that the alpha carbon is extended and a ketone is attached to the beta carbon (with the exception of prolintane), among other modifications.

A cyclized phenethylamine and 2-aminoindane derivative is Pyr-AI ((2-indanyl)pyrrolidine). It is the analogue of 2-aminoindane (2-AI) in which the amine has been replaced with a pyrrolidine group. The drug has been described as having strong and long-lasting amphetamine-like effects in rodents.

== See also ==
- Phenethylamine
- Amphetamine
- Cathinone
