= 3',4'-Dimethoxy-α-pyrrolidinopentiophenone =

Chemical compound

Legal status
- Legal status: CA: Schedule I; DE: NpSG (Industrial and scientific use only); UK: Class B

Identifiers
- IUPAC name: 1-(3,4-Dimethoxyphenyl)-2-(1-pyrrolidinyl)-1-pentanone
- CAS Number: 850442-84-1 850351-99-4 (HCl)
- PubChem CID: 11493035
- ChemSpider: 9667841
- UNII: CG1P9V70LE
- CompTox Dashboard (EPA): DTXSID701024688

Chemical and physical data
- Formula: C_{17}H_{26}NO_{3}
- Molar mass: 292.399 g·mol^{−1}
- 3D model (JSmol): Interactive image
- SMILES: COC=1C=C(C=CC1OC)C(C(CCC)N1CCCC1)=O
- InChI: InChI=1/C17H25NO3/c1-4-7-14(18-10-5-6-11-18)17(19)13-8-9-15(20-2)16(12-13)21-3/h8-9,12,14H,4-7,10-11H2,1-3H3; Key:AGRVUDWDZKZCAA-UHFFFAOYSA-N

3',4'-Dimethoxy-α-pyrrolidinopentiophenone (also known as O-2512, 3,4-dimethoxy-α-PVP, 3,4-DMPV, DMPVP) is a synthetic stimulant drug of the cathinone class that has been sold online as a designer drug. It is a relatively weak inhibitor of serotonin reuptake and has little affinity in vitro for dopamine or noradrenaline transporters.

== See also ==
- 4Cl-PVP
- 4F-PVP
- 4-Et-PVP
- α-PBP
- α-PHP
- α-PPP
- α-PVP
- α-PVT
- MFPVP
- MOPVP
- MDPV
- O-2390
- Pyrovalerone
