= Picilorex =

Chemical compound

Clinical data
- Other names: UP 507-04
- ATC code: None

Identifiers
- IUPAC name: 3-(4-Chlorophenyl)-5-cyclopropyl-2-methylpyrrolidine
- CAS Number: 62510-56-9
- PubChem CID: 191657
- ChemSpider: 166413
- UNII: S8K2JDR3NZ
- CompTox Dashboard (EPA): DTXSID70866933

Chemical and physical data
- Formula: C_{14}H_{18}ClN
- Molar mass: 235.76 g·mol^{−1}
- 3D model (JSmol): Interactive image
- SMILES: CC1C(CC(N1)C2CC2)c3ccc(cc3)Cl
- InChI: InChI=1S/C14H18ClN/c1-9-13(8-14(16-9)11-2-3-11)10-4-6-12(15)7-5-10/h4-7,9,11,13-14,16H,2-3,8H2,1H3; Key:PZJBWSQQDMRZHY-UHFFFAOYSA-N

Picilorex (INN; brand name Roxenan; IUPAC: 3-(4-Chlorophenyl)-5-cyclopropyl-2-methylpyrrolidine) is an anorectic which is no longer marketed. It is a monoamine reuptake inhibitor, a stimulant as well as a derivate of pyrrolidine.

== See also ==
- α-PHP
- α-PHPP
- α-PVP
- Pyrovalerone
- Prolintane
- Rolicyclidine (PCPy)
- MDPV
- List of aminorex analogues
- Substituted phenylmorpholine
