= MPEP (drug) =

Clinical data
- Other names: 1-(α-Methylphenethyl)pyrrolidine; α-Methylphenethylpyrrolidine; α-Methyl-PEP; 1-(1-Methyl-2-phenylethyl)pyrrolidine
- Drug class: Stimulant
- ATC code: None

Identifiers
- IUPAC name: 1-(1-phenylpropan-2-yl)pyrrolidine
- PubChem CID: 53665923
- ChemSpider: 57577614

Chemical and physical data
- Formula: C_{13}H_{19}N
- Molar mass: 189.302 g·mol^{−1}
- 3D model (JSmol): Interactive image
- SMILES: CC(CC1=CC=CC=C1)N2CCCC2
- InChI: InChI=1S/C13H19N/c1-12(14-9-5-6-10-14)11-13-7-3-2-4-8-13/h2-4,7-8,12H,5-6,9-11H2,1H3; Key:AWNZMWZMSDWFCV-UHFFFAOYSA-N

MPEP, also known as 1-(α-methylphenethyl)pyrrolidine, is a stimulant drug of the phenethylamine, amphetamine, and phenylethylpyrrolidine families. It is the α-methyl derivative of phenylethylpyrrolidine (PEP). Notable derivatives of MPEP include prolintane (the α-propyl homologue), α-PPP (the β-keto or cathinone derivative), α-PVP (the β-keto and α-propyl homologue), pyrovalerone (4-methyl-α-PVP), and MDPV (3,4-methylenedioxy-α-PVP), among others. These compounds are known to act as norepinephrine–dopamine reuptake inhibitors (NDRIs) to produce their stimulant effects. MPEP was first described in the scientific literature by R. V. Heinzelman and B. D. Aspergren by 1953.

== See also ==
- Substituted phenylethylpyrrolidine
- Cyclized phenethylamine
