= 4'-Methyl-α-pyrrolidinohexiophenone =

Chemical compound

Clinical data
- Other names: MPHP

Legal status
- Legal status: DE: NpSG (Industrial and scientific use only); UK: Class B; US: Schedule I; Illegal in Sweden

Identifiers
- IUPAC name: (RS)-1-(4-Methylphenyl)-2-(1-pyrrolidinyl)-1-hexanone
- CAS Number: 34138-58-4
- PubChem CID: 6423085
- ChemSpider: 4928584
- UNII: Y8D4922F5K
- CompTox Dashboard (EPA): DTXSID401028805

Chemical and physical data
- Formula: C_{17}H_{25}NO
- Molar mass: 259.393 g·mol^{−1}
- 3D model (JSmol): Interactive image
- Chirality: Racemic mixture
- SMILES: c2cc(C)ccc2C(=O)C(CCCC)N1CCCC1
- InChI: InChI=1S/C17H25NO/c1-3-4-7-16(18-12-5-6-13-18)17(19)15-10-8-14(2)9-11-15/h8-11,16H,3-7,12-13H2,1-2H3; Key:YOSQVMGMENUCDX-UHFFFAOYSA-N

4'-Methyl-α-pyrrolidinohexiophenone (MPHP) is a stimulant compound which has been reported as a novel designer drug. It is closely related to pyrovalerone, being simply its chain-lengthened homologue. In the pyrrolidinophenone series, stimulant activity is maintained so long as the positions of the aryl, ketone and pyrrolidinyl groups are held constant, while the alkyl backbone can be varied anywhere between three and as many as seven carbons, with highest potency usually seen with the pentyl or isohexyl backbone, and a variety of substituents are tolerated on the aromatic ring.

In 2010 a group of researchers from the Institute of Forensic Medicine, University Hospital Jena, Germany concluded that MPHP can lead to serious poisoning with toxic liver damage and rhabdomyolysis.

== Legality ==
In the United States, MPHP is a Schedule I Controlled Substance. Sweden's public health agency suggested to classify MPHP as narcotic on June 1, 2015.

== See also ==
- α-PBP
- α-PHP
- α-PPP
- α-PVP
- 4-Cl-PHP
- MDPHP
- Prolintane
