= Α-Pyrrolidinooctanophenone =

PV9

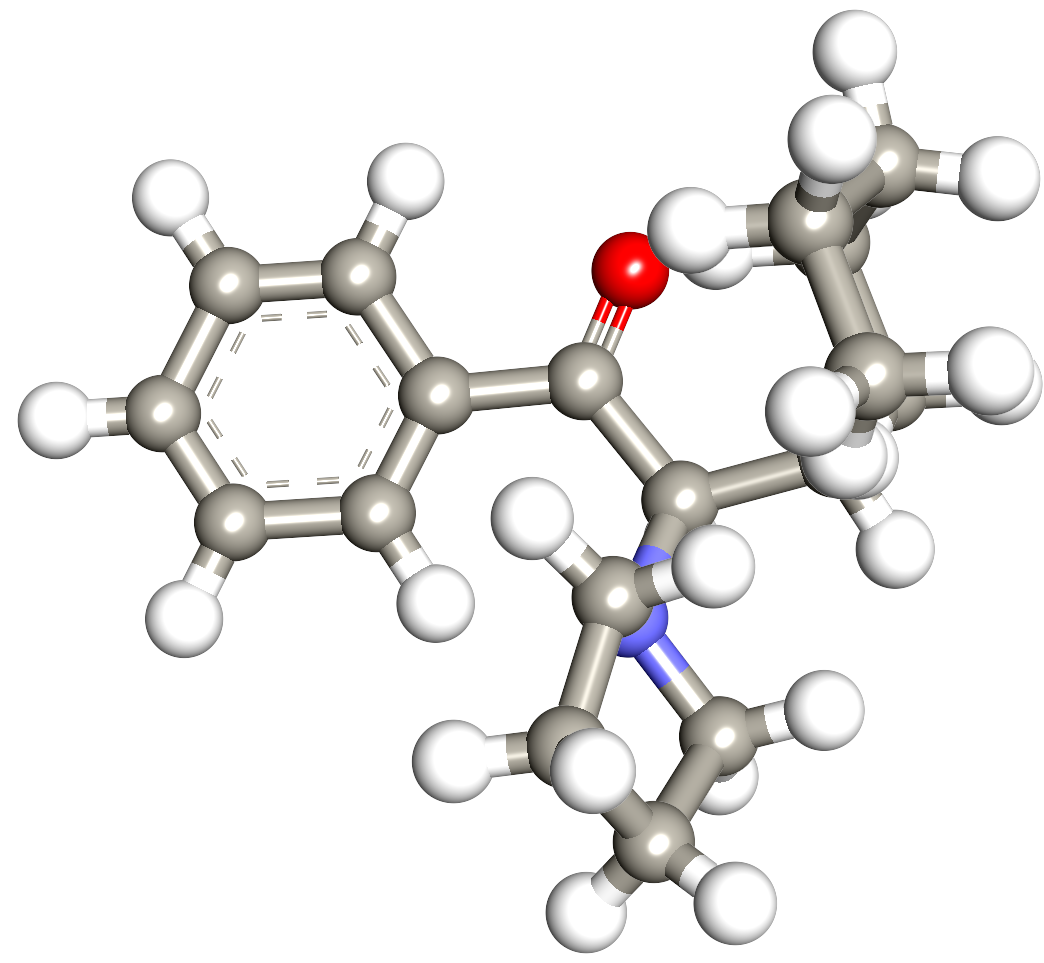

Clinical data
- Other names: α-POP; PV9
- Drug class: Stimulant; Neurotoxin

Legal status
- Legal status: US: Schedule I

Pharmacokinetic data
- Metabolism: CYP1A2, CYP2C9 and CYP2C19

Identifiers
- IUPAC name: 1-phenyl-2-pyrrolidin-1-yloctan-1-one
- CAS Number: 1800101-28-3
- PubChem CID: 102144506
- ChemSpider: 59713432
- UNII: W6L65SKW7D
- ChEBI: CHEBI:172340
- CompTox Dashboard (EPA): DTXSID001342661

Chemical and physical data
- Formula: C_{18}H_{27}NO
- Molar mass: 273.420 g·mol^{−1}
- 3D model (JSmol): Interactive image
- SMILES: CCCCCCC(C(=O)C1=CC=CC=C1)N2CCCC2
- InChI: InChI=1S/C18H27NO/c1-2-3-4-8-13-17(19-14-9-10-15-19)18(20)16-11-6-5-7-12-16/h5-7,11-12,17H,2-4,8-10,13-15H2,1H3; Key:RCGHPLZKUHDGCC-UHFFFAOYSA-N

α-Pyrrolidinooctanophenone (α-POP) also known as PV9 — a central nervous system stimulant that exhibited properties of a neuroinflammatory agent.

== Pharmacology ==
=== Pharmacodynamics ===
α-Pyrrolidinooctanophenone promotes activation of human microglial cells via a ROS/STAT3-dependent pathway.

=== Pharmacokinetics ===
α-Pyrrolidinooctanophenone was metabolized into hydroxy-derivatives or oxidized by the liver to lactam, PV9 has an increased affinity for enzymes of the cytochrome P450 system, to the active centers of the isoforms CYP1A2, CYP2C9 and CYP2C19.

== See also ==
- Substituted phenylethylpyrrolidine
- α-Pyrrolidinopropiophenone (α-PPP)
- α-Pyrrolidinobutiophenone (α-PBP)
- α-Pyrrolidinopentiophenone (α-PVP)
- α-Pyrrolidinohexiophenone (α-PHP)
- α-Pyrrolidinoheptaphenone (α-PHPP)
