= MFPVP =

Designer drug

Legal status
- Legal status: CA: Schedule I; DE: NpSG (Industrial and scientific use only); UK: Class B

Identifiers
- IUPAC name: 1-(3-methyl-4-fluorophenyl)-2-(pyrrolidin-1-yl)pentan-1-one
- CAS Number: 1283478-02-3
- PubChem CID: 163195978
- ChemSpider: 107440848
- CompTox Dashboard (EPA): DTXSID301341943

Chemical and physical data
- Formula: C_{16}H_{22}FNO
- Molar mass: 263.356 g·mol^{−1}
- 3D model (JSmol): Interactive image
- SMILES: CCCC(C(=O)c1ccc(F)c(C)c1)N1CCCC1
- InChI: InChI=1S/C16H22FNO/c1-3-6-15(18-9-4-5-10-18)16(19)13-7-8-14(17)12(2)11-13/h7-8,11,15H,3-6,9-10H2,1-2H3; Key:LFTWWOQOBQFPAT-UHFFFAOYSA-N

MFPVP (3-Methyl-4-fluoro-α-pyrrolidinovalerophenone) is a psychoactive agent from the substituted cathinone family, with stimulant effects. It was first identified in Sweden in April 2020 and was among the most widely encountered substituted cathinone derivatives in 2021, though it since appears to have declined in prevalence. It is illegal in Virginia.

== See also ==
- 3F-PVP
- 4F-PVP
- 4F-PHP
- 4Cl-PVP
- 4-Cl-3-MMC
- MOPVP
- DMPVP
- MDPV
- O-2390
- Pyrovalerone
