= 5-DBFPV =

Stimulant of the cathinone class

Legal status
- Legal status: CA: Schedule I; DE: NpSG (Industrial and scientific use only); UK: Class B

Identifiers
- IUPAC name: 1-(2,3-Dihydrobenzofuran-5-yl)-2-(pyrrolidin-1-yl)pentan-1-one
- CAS Number: 2117405-32-8; hydrochloride: 2117405-33-9
- PubChem CID: 129844558
- ChemSpider: 58858892
- UNII: 260XIB9AAR; hydrochloride: 16K4BIO39O
- CompTox Dashboard (EPA): DTXSID301017203

Chemical and physical data
- Formula: C_{17}H_{23}NO_{2}
- Molar mass: 273.376 g·mol^{−1}
- 3D model (JSmol): Interactive image
- SMILES: CCCC(N1CCCC1)C(C2=CC=C3OCCC3=C2)=O
- InChI: InChI=1S/C17H23NO2/c1-2-5-15(18-9-3-4-10-18)17(19)14-6-7-16-13(12-14)8-11-20-16/h6-7,12,15H,2-5,8-11H2,1H3; Key:CIGWUZUBQBQZAO-UHFFFAOYSA-N

5-DBFPV (also known as 5-dihydrobenzofuranpyrovalerone and 3-desoxy-MDPV) is a stimulant of the cathinone class that has been sold online as a designer drug. It is an analogue of MDPV where the methylenedioxyphenyl group has been replaced by dihydrobenzofuran.

== Legal status ==
5-DBFPV is illegal in Sweden as of 26. January 2016.

It's likely that 5-FDBFPV can apply under the federal analogue act if used for human consumption as it is an analog of Methylenedioxypyrovalerone.

== See also ==
- 3',4'-Dimethoxy-α-pyrrolidinopentiophenone, 3,4-DMPV
- α-Pyrrolidinopentiophenone (α-PVP)
- Pyrovalerone
