= C16H22FNO =

The molecular formula C_{16}H_{22}FNO (molar mass: 263.36 g/mol) may refer to:

- 3F-PHP
- 3F-PiHP
- 4F-PHP
- Melperone
