= O-2390 =

Chemical compound

3,4-Dichloro-alpha-PVP

Clinical data
- Drug class: Serotonin-norepinephrine-dopamine reuptake inhibitor

Identifiers
- IUPAC name: 1-(3,4-dichlorophenyl)-2-(pyrrolidin-1-yl)pentan-1-one
- CAS Number: 850352-61-3
- PubChem CID: 11150726
- ChemSpider: 9325834

Chemical and physical data
- Formula: C_{15}H_{19}Cl_{2}NO
- Molar mass: 300.22 g·mol^{−1}
- 3D model (JSmol): Interactive image
- SMILES: CCCC(C(=O)C1=CC(=C(C=C1)Cl)Cl)N2CCCC2
- InChI: InChI=1S/C15H19Cl2NO/c1-2-5-14(18-8-3-4-9-18)15(19)11-6-7-12(16)13(17)10-11/h6-7,10,14H,2-5,8-9H2,1H3; Key:OYYFMZJTKZIRQM-UHFFFAOYSA-N

O-2390 (3,4-Dichloro-alpha-PVP, DCPVP) is a recreational designer drug from the substituted cathinone family, which acts as a potent inhibitor of dopamine and noradrenaline reuptake in vitro, with weaker but still significant inhibition of serotonin reuptake.

== See also ==
- 3F-PVP
- 4F-PVP
- 4Cl-PVP
- 3,4-DCMP
- Chlorosipentramine
- Cilobamine
- Dichloropane
- LR-5182
- MDPV
- MFPVP
- Naphyrone
- Sertraline
- TH-PVP
