= 4-Chloro-α-pyrrolidinovalerophenone =

Chemical compound

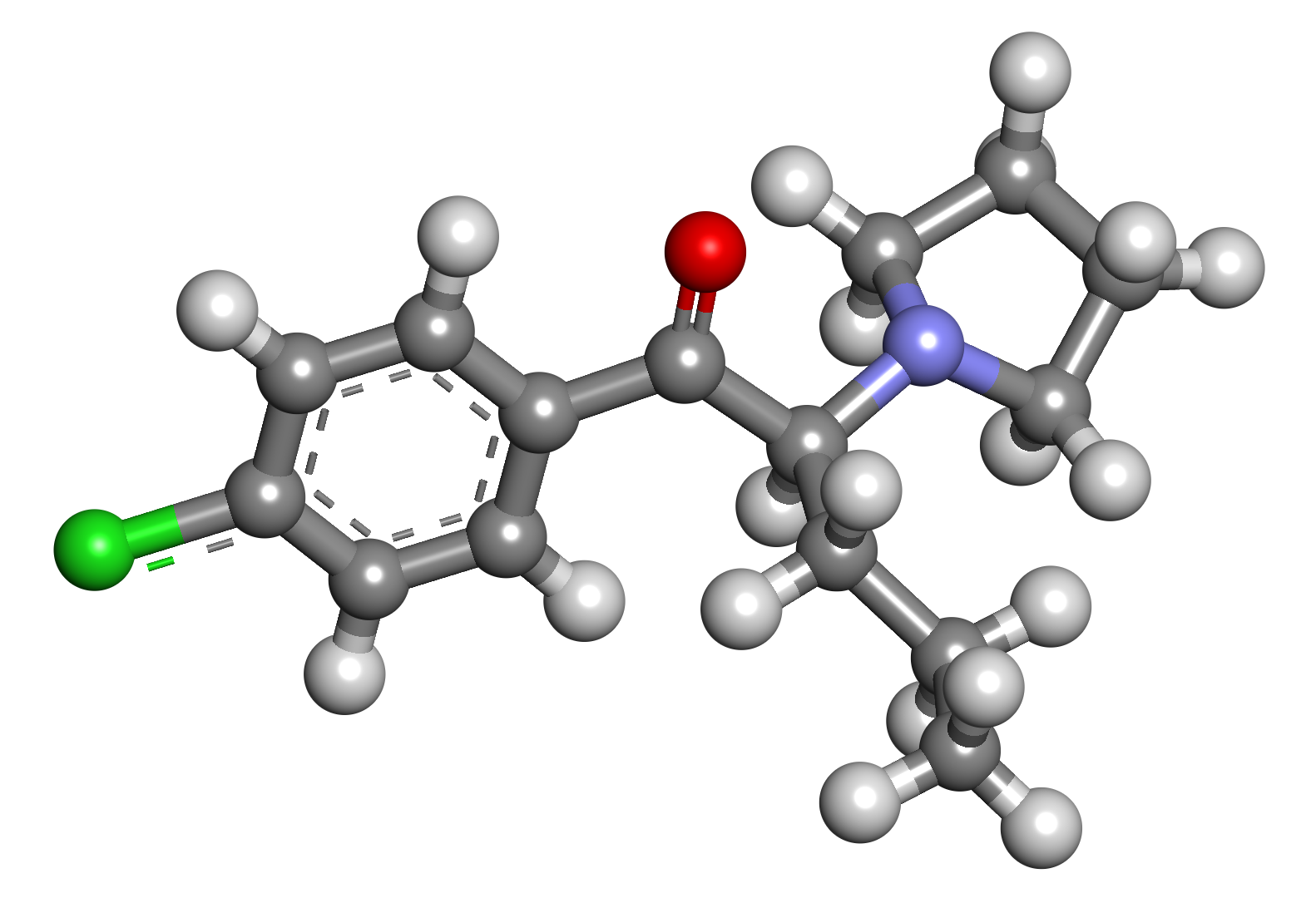

Clinical data
- Routes of administration: Oral, intranasal, intravenous, rectal,

Legal status
- Legal status: BR: Class F2 (Prohibited psychotropics); CA: Schedule I; DE: NpSG (Industrial and scientific use only); UK: Class B; US: Schedule I

Identifiers
- IUPAC name: 1-(4-Chlorophenyl)-2-(1-pyrrolidinyl)-1-pentanone
- CAS Number: 5881-77-6 5537-17-7 (HCl)
- PubChem CID: 69245309
- ChemSpider: 52085629
- UNII: DX2R2SJT7G
- CompTox Dashboard (EPA): DTXSID001014167

Chemical and physical data
- Formula: C_{15}H_{20}ClNO
- Molar mass: 265.78 g·mol^{−1}
- 3D model (JSmol): Interactive image
- SMILES: CCCC(C(=O)c1ccc(cc1)Cl)N2CCCC2
- InChI: InChI=1S/C15H20ClNO/c1-2-5-14(17-10-3-4-11-17)15(18)12-6-8-13(16)9-7-12/h6-9,14H,2-5,10-11H2,1H3; Key:NIGBFBTVONRYQN-UHFFFAOYSA-N

4-Chloro-α-pyrrolidinovalerophenone (also known as 4-chloro-α-pyrrolidinopentiophenone, 4-chloro-α-PVP, 4Cl-PVP, or 4C-PVP) is an emerging recreational designer drug of the pyrrolidinophenone class, similar in structure to α-pyrrolidinopentiophenone (α-PVP). The pharmacology and toxicity of this compound is unknown, though it is presumed to be a stimulant drug.

In the United States, 4-chloro-α-PVP is a Schedule I Controlled Substance.

== See also ==
- 3F-PVP
- 4-Chloromethcathinone
- 4-Cl-PHP
- 4F-PVP
- 4-Et-PVP
- MFPVP
- MOPVP
- DMPVP
- MDPV
- O-2390
- Pyrovalerone
- RTI-31
