= 4'-Fluoro-α-pyrrolidinooctanophenone =

Stimulant drug of the cathinone class

Legal status
- Legal status: CA: Schedule I; DE: NpSG (Industrial and scientific use only); UK: Class B

Identifiers
- IUPAC name: 1-(4-Fluorophenyl)-2-(pyrrolidin-1-yl)octan-1-one
- CAS Number: 1829588-09-1
- PubChem CID: 121262705
- ChemSpider: 58858887
- UNII: 5K4EOQ3QZD
- CompTox Dashboard (EPA): DTXSID601032909

Chemical and physical data
- Formula: C_{18}H_{26}FNO
- Molar mass: 291.410 g·mol^{−1}
- 3D model (JSmol): Interactive image
- SMILES: FC1=CC=C(C=C1)C(C(CCCCCC)N2CCCC2)=O
- InChI: InChI=1S/C18H26FNO/c1-2-3-4-5-8-17(20-13-6-7-14-20)18(21)15-9-11-16(19)12-10-15/h9-12,17H,2-8,13-14H2,1H3; Key:MNXIGHJMEAJIEV-UHFFFAOYSA-N

4'-Fluoro-α-pyrrolidinooctanophenone (also known as 4-Fluoro-PV-9, FPOP and 4-Fluoro-α-POP) is a stimulant drug of the cathinone class which has been reported as a novel designer drug.

== Legality ==
4-F-α-POP is illegal in Japan.

== See also ==
- α-PBP
- α-PHP
- α-PPP
- α-PVP
- 4F-PVP
- 4F-PHP
- Prolintane
