= 4'-Fluoro-α-pyrrolidinopentiophenone =

Designer drug

Legal status
- Legal status: CA: Schedule I; DE: NpSG (Industrial and scientific use only); UK: Class B

Identifiers
- IUPAC name: 1-(4-Fluorophenyl)-2-(pyrrolidin-1-yl)pentan-1-one
- CAS Number: 850352-62-4; HCl: 850352-31-7
- PubChem CID: 11322641
- ChemSpider: 9497595
- UNII: 2417D71166; HCl: TQ3P60HMQA
- CompTox Dashboard (EPA): DTXSID401024677

Chemical and physical data
- Formula: C_{15}H_{20}FNO
- Molar mass: 249.329 g·mol^{−1}
- 3D model (JSmol): Interactive image
- SMILES: FC1=CC=C(C=C1)C(C(CCC)N2CCCC2)=O
- InChI: InChI=1S/C15H20FNO/c1-2-5-14(17-10-3-4-11-17)15(18)12-6-8-13(16)9-7-12/h6-9,14H,2-5,10-11H2,1H3; Key:BQLSUBYYRRZHRK-UHFFFAOYSA-N

4'-Fluoro-α-pyrrolidinopentiophenone (also known as O-2370, FPVP and 4-Fluoro-α-PVP) is a stimulant drug of the cathinone class which has been reported as a novel designer drug.

== Legality ==
4-F-α-PVP is illegal in China, Hungary, and Japan.

== See also ==
- 3F-PVP
- 4-Fluoro-α-POP
- 4Cl-PVP
- 4-Et-PVP
- 4F-PHP
- 4F-POP
- α-PBP
- α-PHP
- α-PPP
- α-PVP
- MFPVP
- MOPVP
- DMPVP
- MDPV
- Prolintane
