= 4-Bromo-α-pyrrolidinopentiophenone =

O-2419

Clinical data
- Other names: 4Br-alpha-PVP; 4Br-α-PVP; 4-Bromo-alpha-PVP; 4-Bromo-α-PVP; 4′-Bromo-α-Pyrrolidinopentiophenone; 4-bromo-α-pyrrolidinvalerophenone; para-Bromo-α-Pyrrolidinopentiophenone and others.
- Drug class: SNDRI; central nervous system stimulant with potential entactogenic effects

Identifiers
- IUPAC name: 1-(4-Bromophenyl)-2-(1-pyrrolidinyl)-1-pentanone
- CAS Number: 850352-59-9
- PubChem CID: 11220599
- ChemSpider: 9395653
- UNII: W27ZP6H9WL
- ChEMBL: ChEMBL202420
- CompTox Dashboard (EPA): 901343228

Chemical and physical data
- Formula: C_{15}H_{20}BrNO
- Molar mass: 310.235 g·mol^{−1}
- 3D model (JSmol): Interactive image
- SMILES: CCCC(C(=O)C1=CC=C(C=C1)Br)N2CCCC2
- InChI: InChI=1S/C15H20BrNO/c1-2-5-14(17-10-3-4-11-17)15(18)12-6-8-13(16)9-7-12/h6-9,14H,2-5,10-11H2,1H3; Key:RAHKQMUBMIJUFG-UHFFFAOYSA-N

4-Bromo-α-pyrrolidinopentiophenone, also known as 4Br-alpha-PVP, 4Br-α-PVP, or 4-bromo-α-pyrrolidinvalerophenone, is a stimulant drug belonging to the family of substituted cathinones and α-propylphenethylamines (and the related class of pyrrolidinophenones). It, along with other closely related compounds, was designated by the code ‘O-’ and is known as O-2419.

== Pharmacology ==
=== Pharmacodynamics ===
4-Bromo-α-PVP is a serotonin–norepinephrine–dopamine reuptake inhibitor; its affinity value (K_{i}) for the serotonin, norepinephrine and dopamine transporters is 830 ± 190, 386 ± 53 and 51.0 ± 6.7 nM respectively; the IC_{50} values for the three transporters were 39.5 ± 7.5 nM for DAT, 1050 ± 90 nM for SERT and 83 ± 30 nM for NET.

4-bromo-α-PVP did not induce anxiety-like behaviour in mice, in contrast to other known para- and meta-halogen-substituted (i.e. at the 3- and 4-positions of the benzene ring of cathinones) compounds such as 3-Cl-α-PVP, 4-F-α-PVP; this may be due to a serotonin background that is significantly higher than that of other halo- or other cathinone derivatives, although this requires further investigation. In a study of horizontal motor activity at a moderate dose (10 mg/kg): the effect of 4-bromo-α-PVP on mice wore off the quickest — the increased activity subsided completely in less than 60 minutes; at a high dose (25 mg/kg), a severe, prolonged effect set in, causing the animals to run frantically for over an hour. A conditioned place preference test was also conducted; 4-bromo-α-PVP, like other cathinone derivatives, caused severe dependence even at low doses (2.5 mg/kg); at the maximum dose (25 mg/kg), the findings indicative of addiction were exacerbated.
