= 4-Et-PVP =

Substituted cathinone stimulant drug

4-Ethyl-alpha-PVP

Legal status
- Legal status: CA: Schedule I; DE: NpSG (Industrial and scientific use only); UK: Class B

Identifiers
- IUPAC name: 1-(4-ethylphenyl)-2-(pyrrolidin-1-yl)pentan-1-one
- PubChem CID: 165360206
- ChemSpider: 129558504
- CompTox Dashboard (EPA): DTXSID601336965

Chemical and physical data
- Formula: C_{17}H_{25}NO
- Molar mass: 259.393 g·mol^{−1}
- 3D model (JSmol): Interactive image
- SMILES: CCCC(C(=O)c1ccc(CC)cc1)N1CCCC1
- InChI: InChI=1S/C17H25NO/c1-3-7-16(18-12-5-6-13-18)17(19)15-10-8-14(4-2)9-11-15/h8-11,16H,3-7,12-13H2,1-2H3; Key:DXQSRSYIYCRPMM-UHFFFAOYSA-N

4-Ethyl-alpha-Pyrrolidinovalerophenone (4-Et-PVP) is a recreational designer drug from the substituted cathinone family, with stimulant effects. It was first identified in Hungary in March 2019.

== See also ==
- 3,4-EtPV
- 3F-PVP
- 4-EMC
- 4-Ethylamphetamine
- 4F-PVP
- 4Cl-PVP
- MOPVP
- DMPVP
- MDPV
- Pyrovalerone
- RTI-83
