= 4-Cl-PHP =

Chemical compound

4-Chloro-alpha-PHP
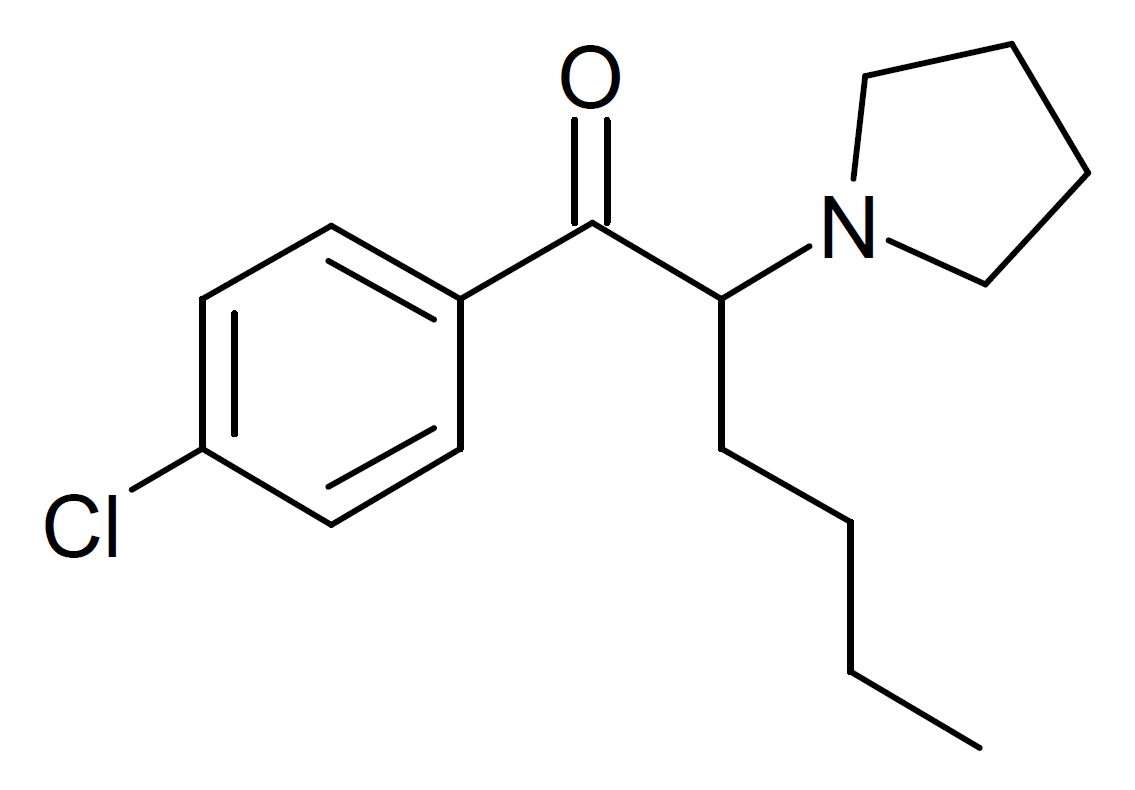

Legal status
- Legal status: CA: Schedule I; DE: NpSG (Industrial and scientific use only); UK: Class B

Identifiers
- IUPAC name: 1-(4-chlorophenyl)-2-pyrrolidin-1-ylhexan-1-one
- CAS Number: 2748592-28-9
- PubChem CID: 137331671
- ChemSpider: 129432275
- UNII: 4FEN4JLH4D

Chemical and physical data
- Formula: C_{16}H_{22}ClNO
- Molar mass: 279.81 g·mol^{−1}
- 3D model (JSmol): Interactive image
- SMILES: CCCCC(C(=O)C1=CC=C(C=C1)Cl)N2CCCC2
- InChI: InChI=1S/C16H22ClNO/c1-2-3-6-15(18-11-4-5-12-18)16(19)13-7-9-14(17)10-8-13/h7-10,15H,2-6,11-12H2,1H3; Key:RRSPZEIKSCFOEE-UHFFFAOYSA-N

4-Chloro-alpha-pyrrolidinohexiophenone (4-Cl-PHP) is a substituted cathinone derivative with stimulant effects, which has been sold as a designer drug. It was first officially identified by forensic laboratories in 2016, though anecdotal reports suggest it may have been available several years prior to this.

== See also ==
- α-PHP
- 4F-PVP
- 3F-PHP
- 4F-PHP
- 4Cl-PVP
- MPHP
- MDPHP
- 4F-PV9
- Chlorosipentramine
