= Α-Pyrrolidinoheptaphenone =

Chemical compound

α-Pyrrolidinoheptaphenone

Clinical data
- Other names: α-PHPP; alpha-PHPP; alpha-Pyrrolidinoheptiophenone; alpha-Pyrrolidinoheptanophenone; PV-8; PV8; Aphpp; A-PHPP

Legal status
- Legal status: CA: Schedule I; DE: NpSG (Industrial and scientific use only); UK: Class B; US: Schedule I

Identifiers
- IUPAC name: 1-Phenyl-2-pyrrolidin-1-ylheptan-1-one
- CAS Number: 13415-83-3 13415-55-9 (HCl) 2304915-38-4 (R) 2304915-72-6 (S)
- PubChem CID: 69245534
- ChemSpider: 57379805
- UNII: E6220IS097
- CompTox Dashboard (EPA): DTXSID501016918

Chemical and physical data
- Formula: C_{17}H_{25}NO
- Molar mass: 259.393 g·mol^{−1}
- 3D model (JSmol): Interactive image
- SMILES: CCCCCC(C(=O)C1=CC=CC=C1)N2CCCC2
- InChI: InChI=1S/C17H25NO/c1-2-3-5-12-16(18-13-8-9-14-18)17(19)15-10-6-4-7-11-15/h4,6-7,10-11,16H,2-3,5,8-9,12-14H2,1H3; Key:DLRWKNLMJAIFQB-UHFFFAOYSA-N

α-Pyrrolidinoheptaphenone (PV8, α-PEP, α-PHPP, Aphpp, A-PHPP) is a designer drug of the pyrrolidinophenone class of cathinones. It is the higher homolog of α-pyrrolidinohexiophenone (α-PHP).

In the United States, α-pyrrolidinoheptaphenone is a Schedule I Controlled Substance.

== See also ==
- α-PHP
- α-PHiP
- α-PCyP
- 4F-PV9
- MDPV
- N-Ethylheptedrone
