= C15H20FNO =

The molecular formula C_{15}H_{20}FNO (molar mass: 249.329 g/mol) may refer to:

- 2-FXPr (2'-Fluoro-2-oxo-PCPr)
- 3F-PVP
- 4'-Fluoro-α-pyrrolidinopentiophenone (4F-PVP)
