= C18H27NO =

The molecular formula C_{18}H_{27}NO (molar mass: 273.41 g/mol, exact mass: 273.2093 u) may refer to:

- 3-MeO-PCP (3-Methoxyphencyclidine)
- 4-MeO-PCP (4-Methoxyphencyclidine)
- α-Pyrrolidinooctanophenone (α-POP, PV9)
