= 4'-Methoxy-α-pyrrolidinopentiophenone =

Stimulant drug

Legal status
- Legal status: CA: Schedule I; DE: NpSG (Industrial and scientific use only); UK: Class B; Illegal in China

Identifiers
- IUPAC name: 1-(4-Methoxyphenyl)-2-(pyrrolidin-1-yl)pentan-1-one
- CAS Number: 14979-97-6; HCl: 5537-19-9
- PubChem CID: 11299968
- ChemSpider: 9474945
- UNII: UM9572UF9L; HCl: VO3305HZ8I
- ChEMBL: ChEMBL381127
- CompTox Dashboard (EPA): DTXSID501032718

Chemical and physical data
- Formula: C_{16}H_{23}NO_{2}
- Molar mass: 261.365 g·mol^{−1}
- 3D model (JSmol): Interactive image
- SMILES: COC1=CC=C(C(C(CCC)N2CCCC2)=O)C=C1.Cl
- InChI: InChI=1S/C16H23NO2/c1-3-6-15(17-11-4-5-12-17)16(18)13-7-9-14(19-2)10-8-13/h7-10,15H,3-6,11-12H2,1-2H3; Key:HWYVHRCKBXGZLV-UHFFFAOYSA-N

4'-Methoxy-α-pyrrolidinopentiophenone (also known as O-2417, 4-MeO-α-PVP and MOPVP) is a stimulant drug of the cathinone class that has been sold online as a designer drug.

== Legal Status ==
As of October 2015 4-MeO-α-PVP is a controlled substance in China.

== See also ==
- 4Cl-PVP
- 4F-PVP
- 4-Et-PVP
- alpha-Pyrrolidinopentiophenone
- 4'-Methoxy-α-pyrrolidinopropiophenone
- DMPVP
- MDPV
- Pyrovalerone
