= 3F-PHP =

Chemical compound

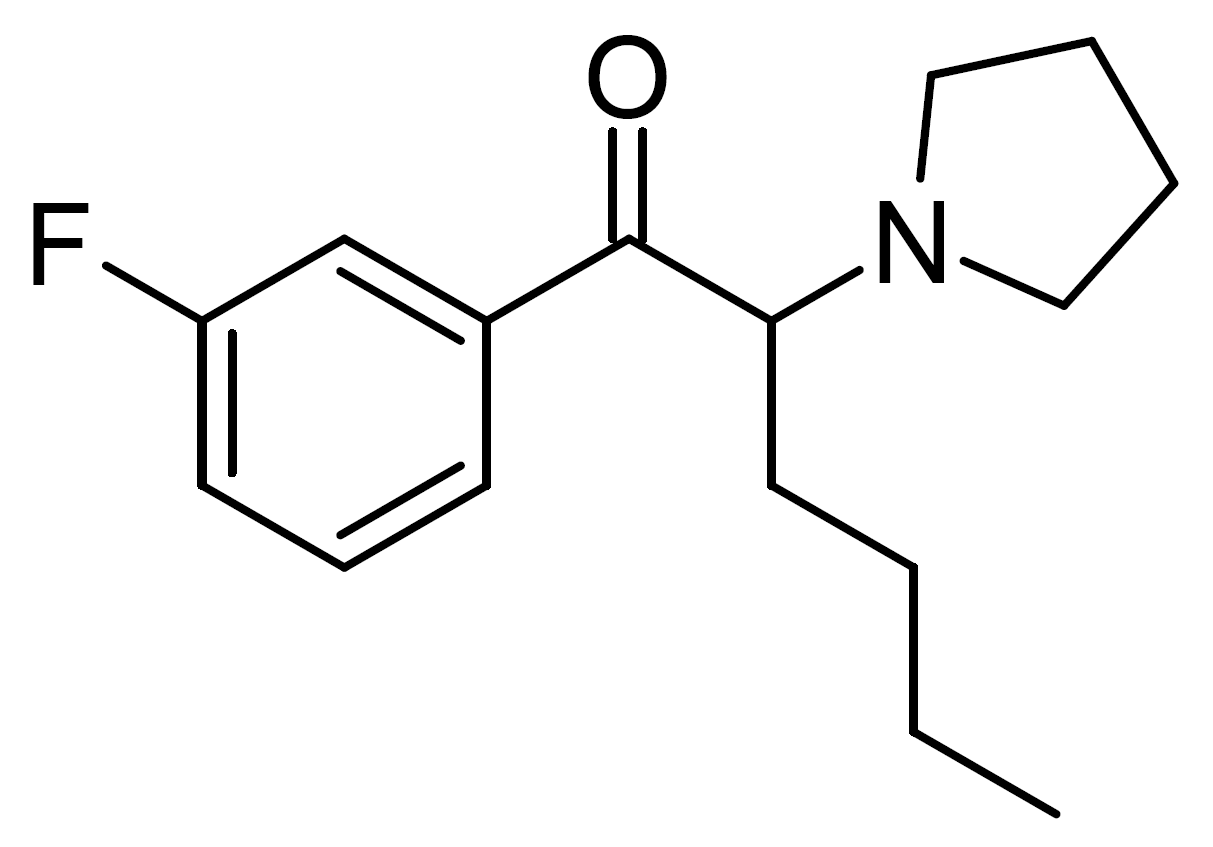

Legal status
- Legal status: DE: Anlage II (Authorized trade only, not prescriptible); UK: Class B

Identifiers
- IUPAC name: 1-(3-fluorophenyl)-2-pyrrolidin-1-ylhexan-1-one
- PubChem CID: 164946382
- CompTox Dashboard (EPA): DTXSID801343013

Chemical and physical data
- Formula: C_{16}H_{22}FNO
- Molar mass: 263.356 g·mol^{−1}
- 3D model (JSmol): Interactive image
- SMILES: CCCCC(C(=O)C1=CC(=CC=C1)F)N2CCCC2
- InChI: InChI=1S/C16H22FNO/c1-2-3-9-15(18-10-4-5-11-18)16(19)13-7-6-8-14(17)12-13/h6-8,12,15H,2-5,9,1H3; Key:CVMQYIITOOHIOA-UHFFFAOYSA-N

3-Fluoro-alpha-PHP (3F-PHP) is a substituted cathinone derivative with stimulant effects which has been sold as a designer drug. It was first identified in Sweden in 2020 and continues to be detected in seized drug samples, though it appears to have been less widely used than related compounds such as 3F-PVP and 3F-PiHP.

== See also ==
- 3-Fluoromethamphetamine
- 3-Fluoromethcathinone
- 3,5-Difluoromethcathinone
- 3F-NEB
- 3F-NEH
- 4F-PHP
- 4-Cl-PHP
- MDPHP
