= Vitamin P (disambiguation) =

Vitamin P may refer to:

- Flavonoids, referred to as vitamin P from the mid-1930s to early 1950s
- Fluoxetine (Prozac), euphemistically referred to as vitamin P, a selective serotonin reuptake inhibitor used for depression and various mental disorders
- Paroxetine (Paxil), euphemistically referred to as vitamin P, a selective serotonin reuptake inhibitor used for depression and anxiety disorders
- Prolintane, euphemistically referred to as vitamin P, a norepinephrine-dopamine reuptake inhibitor stimulant
