= C17H23Cl2NO =

The molecular formula C_{17}H_{23}Cl_{2}NO (molar mass: 328.27662 g/mol, exact mass: 327.1157 u) may refer to:

- Cilobamine
- Tesofensine (NS2330)
