= 4F-PHP =

Chemical compound

4-Fluoro-alpha-PHP

Legal status
- Legal status: US: Unscheduled, illegal in Virginia

Identifiers
- IUPAC name: 1-(4-fluorophenyl)-2-(pyrrolidin-1-yl)hexan-1-one
- CAS Number: 2230706-09-7
- PubChem CID: 132989300
- ChemSpider: 59718638
- UNII: J34J7K4GL5
- CompTox Dashboard (EPA): DTXSID201341964

Chemical and physical data
- Formula: C_{16}H_{22}FNO
- Molar mass: 263.356 g·mol^{−1}
- 3D model (JSmol): Interactive image
- SMILES: CCCCC(C(=O)C1=CC=C(C=C1)F)N2CCCC2
- InChI: InChI=1S/C16H22FNO/c1-2-3-6-15(18-11-4-5-12-18)16(19)13-7-9-14(17)10-8-13/h7-10,15H,2-6,11-12H2,1H3; Key:BCJXLSGKMNRRKO-UHFFFAOYSA-N

4-Fluoro-alpha-PHP (4F-PHP) is a recreational designer drug from the substituted cathinone family with stimulant effects, which first appeared on the illicit market in around 2017. This compound is structurally related to other well-known stimulants and has garnered attention for its potential to mimic the effects of traditional amphetamines, leading users to seek it out for its energizing and euphoric properties.

== See also ==
- α-PHP
- 3F-PVP
- 3F-NEH
- 3F-PHP
- 3F-PiHP
- 4F-PVP
- 4Cl-PVP
- 4-Cl-PHP
- 4F-POP
- MFPVP
- MDPHP
- N-Ethylhexedrone
- N-Ethylhexylone
