= 3F-NEB =

Substituted cathinone stimulant drug

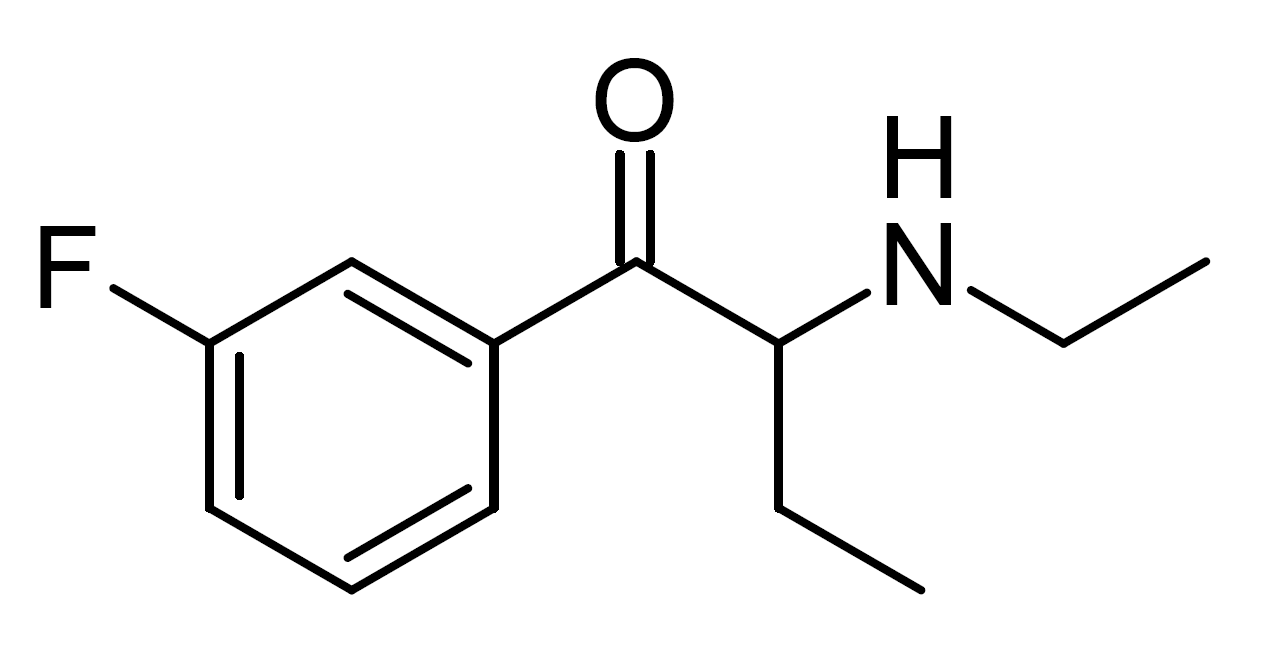

Legal status
- Legal status: DE: Anlage II (Authorized trade only, not prescriptible); UK: Class B

Identifiers
- IUPAC name: 2-(ethylamino)-1-(3-fluorophenyl)butan-1-one
- PubChem CID: 164946359
- CompTox Dashboard (EPA): DTXSID901343028

Chemical and physical data
- Formula: C_{12}H_{16}FNO
- Molar mass: 209.264 g·mol^{−1}
- 3D model (JSmol): Interactive image
- SMILES: CCC(C(=O)C1=CC(=CC=C1)F)NCC
- InChI: InChI=1S/C12H16FNO/c1-3-11(14-4-2)12(15)9-6-5-7-10(13)8-9/h5-8,11,14H,3-4H2,1-2H3; Key:FLFAFGGBRUXYBD-UHFFFAOYSA-N

3-Fluoro-N-ethylbuphedrone (3F-NEB) is a substituted cathinone derivative with stimulant effects which has been sold as a designer drug. It was first identified in Sweden in 2021.

== Pharmacology ==
=== Pharmacodynamics ===
In vivo, 3F-NEB acts as a potent inhibitor of the dopamine transporter, exhibiting more than 100-fold selectivity over the serotonin transporter. Administration of 3 milligrams rapidly increased extracellular dopamine levels in the nucleus accumbens, of the rat. At the behavioural level, 3F-NEB caused a dose-dependent increase in motor activity at doses of 10–30 mg/kg, with the highest doses inducing anxiety-like effects.

== See also ==
- 3-Fluoromethcathinone
- 3F-NEH
- 3F-PVP
- 3F-PiHP
