= Α-PHiP =

Stimulant drug

α-Pyrrolidinoisohexanophenone

Legal status
- Legal status: BR: Class F2 (Prohibited psychotropics); CA: Schedule I; DE: Anlage II (Authorized trade only, not prescriptible); UK: Class B

Identifiers
- IUPAC name: 4-methyl-1-phenyl-2-(pyrrolidin-1-yl)pentan-1-one
- CAS Number: 2181620-71-1
- PubChem CID: 59809191
- ChemSpider: 68006957
- UNII: 9AF2IHV9HK
- KEGG: C22829
- CompTox Dashboard (EPA): DTXSID201337042

Chemical and physical data
- Formula: C_{16}H_{23}NO
- Molar mass: 245.366 g·mol^{−1}
- 3D model (JSmol): Interactive image
- SMILES: CC(C)CC(C(=O)c1ccccc1)N2CCCC2
- InChI: InChI=1S/C16H23NO/c1-13(2)12-15(17-10-6-7-11-17)16(18)14-8-4-3-5-9-14/h3-5,8-9,13,15H,6-7,10-12H2,1-2H3; Key:UOZWZANRCOALQL-UHFFFAOYSA-N

α-Pyrrolidinoisohexanophenone (mainly known as A-PiHP or α-PiHP) is a stimulant drug of the cathinone class that has been sold online as a designer drug. It acts as a potent norepinephrine-dopamine reuptake inhibitor (NDRI). In July 2016 α-PiHP was first identified as a designer drug when it was reported to the EUDA by a forensic laboratory in Slovenia. It is a positional isomer of pyrovalerone, with the methyl group shifted from the 4-position of the aromatic ring to the 4-position of the acyl chain. Similarly to other cathinones, use of α-PiHP can result in compulsive redosing, addiction, anxiety, paranoia, and psychosis.

== Pharmacology ==
In a classic 2006 study of pyrrolidinyl cathinone derivatives by Meltzer et al. at Organix, the alpha-isobutyl derivative of pyrovalerone, O-2494, was found to have the highest potency in vitro as an inhibitor of the dopamine transporter of the alpha substituted derivatives tested. Compared to α-PVP and α-PHP, α-PiHP displays a higher selectivity for the dopamine transporter.

== See also ==
- 3F-PiHP
- Aletamine
- α-PHP
- α-PCYP
- Solriamfetol
