= Α-PCYP =

Stimulant drug

α-PCyP
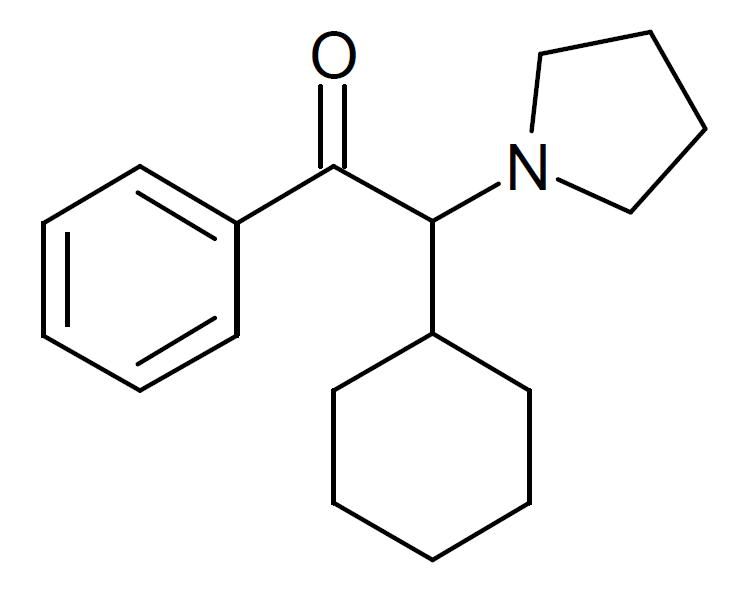

Legal status
- Legal status: CA: Schedule I; DE: NpSG (Industrial and scientific use only); UK: Under Psychoactive Substances Act; US: Unscheduled; Illegal in Virginia

Identifiers
- IUPAC name: 2-cyclohexyl-1-phenyl-2-(pyrrolidin-1-yl)ethanone
- CAS Number: 1803168-11-7
- PubChem CID: 155884437
- UNII: PJ2S9WH4A2
- CompTox Dashboard (EPA): DTXSID501337041

Chemical and physical data
- Formula: C_{18}H_{25}NO
- Molar mass: 271.404 g·mol^{−1}
- 3D model (JSmol): Interactive image
- SMILES: O=C(C(C1CCCCC1)N2CCCC2)c3ccccc3
- InChI: InChI=1S/C18H25NO/c20-18(16-11-5-2-6-12-16)17(19-13-7-8-14-19)15-9-3-1-4-10-15/h2,5-6,11-12,15,17H,1,3-4,7-10,13-14H2; Key:FKEHRWJWTWDTDB-UHFFFAOYSA-N

α-PCyP (α-Pyrrolidinocyclohexanophenone) is a stimulant drug of the cathinone class that has been sold online as a designer drug. In a series of alpha-substituted pyrrolidinyl cathinone derivatives developed in 2015, the alpha-cyclopentyl derivative was found to have around the same potency in vitro as an inhibitor of the dopamine transporter as the alpha-propyl derivative α-PVP, while the alpha-cyclohexyl derivative α-PCyP was around twice as strong.

== See also ==
- PCPy
- Picilorex
- α-PHP
- α-PHiP
- Alpha-D2PV
- βk-Ephenidine
- Diphenidine
- Indapyrophenidone
- UWA-101
- Zylofuramine
