= Α-Pyrrolidinopentiothiophenone =

Stimulant drug

α-PVT

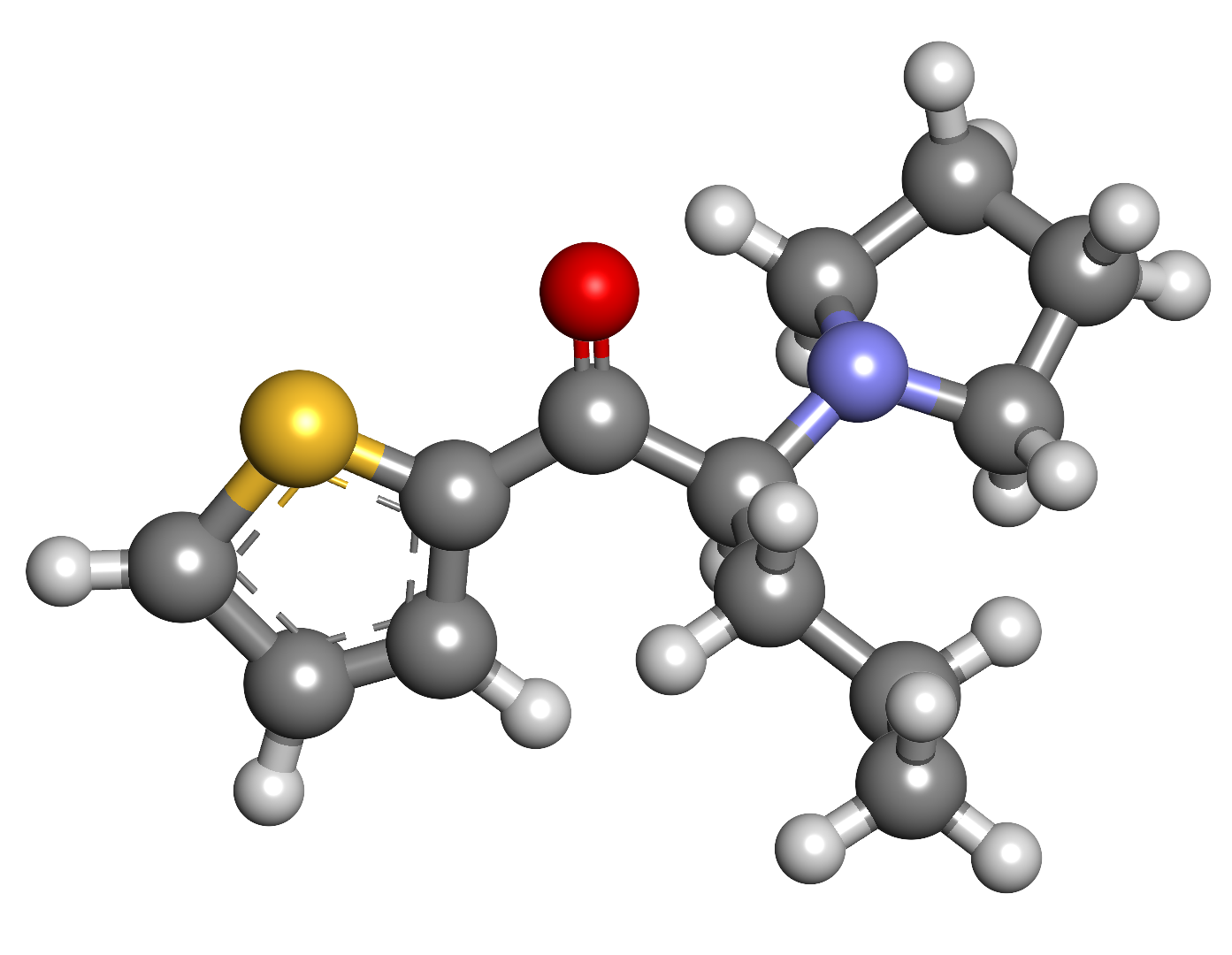

Legal status
- Legal status: DE: Anlage II (Authorized trade only, not prescriptible); UK: Class B; Illegal in China, Sweden and Switzerland

Identifiers
- IUPAC name: 2-(Pyrrolidin-1-yl)-1-(thiophen-2-yl)pentan-1-one
- CAS Number: 1400742-66-6
- PubChem CID: 71721462
- ChemSpider: 29738196
- UNII: 6JA2K09914
- CompTox Dashboard (EPA): DTXSID90857020

Chemical and physical data
- Formula: C_{13}H_{19}NOS
- Molar mass: 237.36 g·mol^{−1}
- 3D model (JSmol): Interactive image
- SMILES: CCCC(N1CCCC1)C(=O)c2sccc2
- InChI: InChI=1S/C13H19NOS/c1-2-6-11(14-8-3-4-9-14)13(15)12-7-5-10-16-12/h5,7,10-11H,2-4,6,8-9H2,1H3; Key:OOSRPGUQJAKBLV-UHFFFAOYSA-N

α-Pyrrolidinopentiothiophenone (also known as α-PVT) is a synthetic stimulant of the cathinone and thiopropamine (thiophenylpropylamine) families that has been sold online as a designer drug. It is an analogue of α-PVP where the phenyl ring has been replaced by thiophene.

α-PVT was first identified in Japan in 2013. Its metabolism has been described in literature.

It produces stimulating effects in humans, according to the individuals who have tried it. Most of the individuals who have tried it prefer α-PVP and α-PPP to it.

== Side effects ==
α-PVT has been shown to possess high cytotoxicity against human cell lines.

== Legality ==
Sweden's public health agency suggested classifying α-PVT as hazardous substance on November 10, 2014.

As of October 2015 α-PVT is a controlled substance in China.

α-PVT is illegal in Switzerland as of December 2015.

== See also ==
- α-Pyrrolidinopropiophenone (α-PPP)
- α-Pyrrolidinobutiophenone (α-PBP)
- α-Pyrrolidinohexiophenone (α-PHP)
- Methiopropamine
- Naphyrone (O-2482)
- Pyrovalerone (O-2371)
- Thiopropamine
- Thiothinone
