= Rolicyclidine =

Chemical compound

Clinical data
- ATC code: none

Legal status
- Legal status: AU: S9 (Prohibited substance); BR: Class F2 (Prohibited psychotropics); CA: Schedule III; DE: Anlage I (Authorized scientific use only); UK: Class A; US: Schedule I; UN: Psychotropic Schedule I

Identifiers
- IUPAC name: 1-(1-phenylcyclohexyl)pyrrolidine
- CAS Number: 2201-39-0
- PubChem CID: 62436
- DrugBank: DB01549
- ChemSpider: 56218
- UNII: 183O9O9JE3
- KEGG: D12706
- ChEBI: CHEBI:60805
- CompTox Dashboard (EPA): DTXSID8046167

Chemical and physical data
- Formula: C_{16}H_{23}N
- Molar mass: 229.367 g·mol^{−1}
- 3D model (JSmol): Interactive image
- SMILES: c1ccccc1C3(N2CCCC2)CCCCC3
- InChI: InChI=1S/C16H23N/c1-3-9-15(10-4-1)16(11-5-2-6-12-16)17-13-7-8-14-17/h1,3-4,9-10H,2,5-8,11-14H2; Key:FYOWWXMGDATDQY-UHFFFAOYSA-N

Rolicyclidine (PCPy) is a dissociative anesthetic that is similar in effects to phencyclidine, but is slightly less potent and has fewer stimulant effects. It instead produces a sedative effect described as being somewhat similar to a barbiturate, but with additional PCP-like dissociative, anaesthetic and hallucinogenic effects. Due to its similarity in effects to PCP, PCPy was placed into the Schedule I list of illegal drugs in the 1970s, although it has never been widely abused and is now little known.

== See also ==
- PCP
- Arylcyclohexylamine
- Picilorex
- α-PHP
