= Alfetamine =

Chemical compound

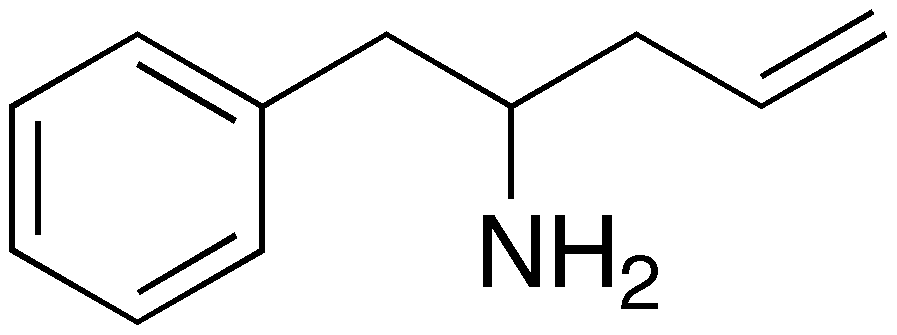

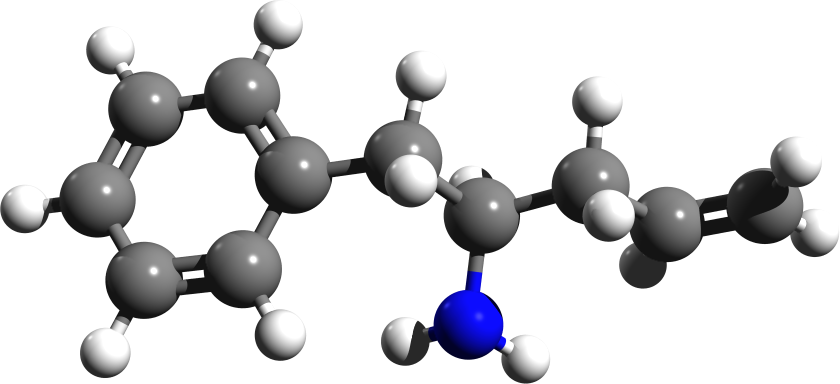

Clinical data
- Other names: Alfetadrine; Aletamine; α-Allylphenethylamine; α-Allyl-β-phenylethylamine
- ATC code: none

Identifiers
- IUPAC name: 1-phenylpent-4-en-2-amine
- CAS Number: 4255-23-6
- PubChem CID: 20254
- ChemSpider: 19080
- UNII: Q3V87119BP
- ChEMBL: ChEMBL2110598
- CompTox Dashboard (EPA): DTXSID60863350

Chemical and physical data
- Formula: C_{11}H_{15}N
- Molar mass: 161.248 g·mol^{−1}
- 3D model (JSmol): Interactive image
- SMILES: NC(Cc1ccccc1)C\C=C
- InChI: InChI=1S/C11H15N/c1-2-6-11(12)9-10-7-4-3-5-8-10/h2-5,7-8,11H,1,6,9,12H2; Key:WQKXQJYCZMWOSD-UHFFFAOYSA-N

Alfetamine, or α-allyl-phenethylamine, is a chemical compound of the phenethylamine family. It was briefly investigated as a possible antidepressant in the early 1970s. Its activity profile was said to be very similar to imipramine and amitriptyline, two tricyclic antidepressants. It has now been largely superseded by the newer compounds in this class, and only rarely found in scientific literature. The "alpha" in its name refers to its prodrug form, alfetamine. In addition to being an antidepressant, alfetamine is also a neuroprotective agent that acts as a weak dopamine antagonist and a high affinity κ-opioid receptor agonist.

Alfetamine was synthesized by Kenji Tsukada and colleagues at Shinshu University and Dow Chemical Company in the 1960s and early 1970s.
