= MDPHP =

Chemical compound

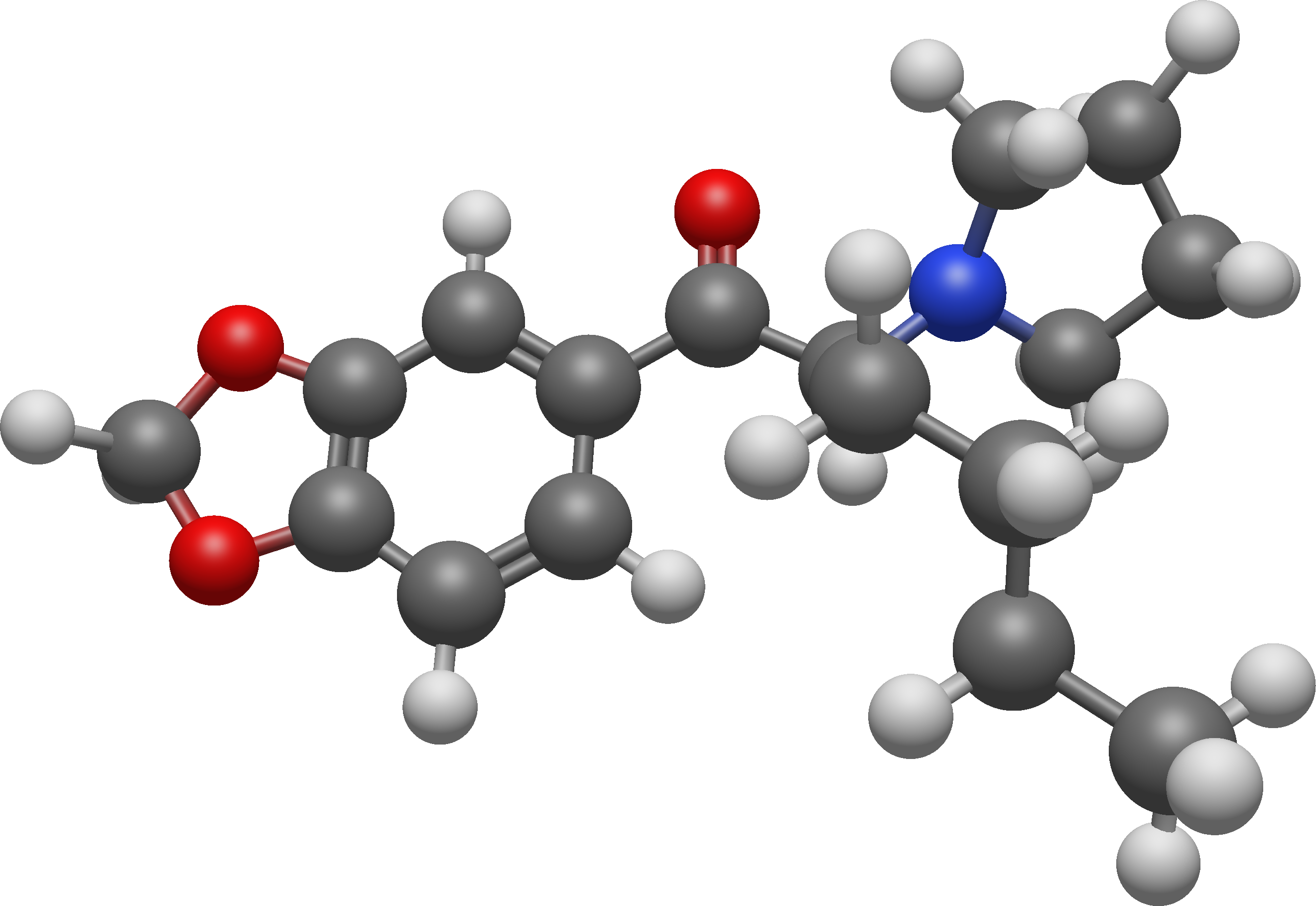

Clinical data
- ATC code: None

Legal status
- Legal status: CA: Schedule I; DE: NpSG (Industrial and scientific use only); UK: Class B; Illegal in Japan and Hungary

Identifiers
- IUPAC name: 1-(2H-1,3-Benzodioxol-5-yl)-2-(pyrrolidin-1-yl)hexan-1-one
- CAS Number: 776994-64-0
- PubChem CID: 119057580
- ChemSpider: 52085733
- UNII: 7P3X2C24CS
- CompTox Dashboard (EPA): DTXSID701018396

Chemical and physical data
- Formula: C_{17}H_{23}NO_{3}
- Molar mass: 289.375 g·mol^{−1}
- 3D model (JSmol): Interactive image
- SMILES: CCCCC(N1CCCC1)C(=O)c2ccc3OCOc3c2
- InChI: InChI=1S/C17H23NO3/c1-2-3-6-14(18-9-4-5-10-18)17(19)13-7-8-15-16(11-13)21-12-20-15/h7-8,11,14H,2-6,9-10,12H2,1H3; Key:OBLFRFGUZZRECT-UHFFFAOYSA-N

MDPHP (3',4'-Methylenedioxy-α-pyrrolidinohexiophenone) is a stimulant of the cathinone class originally developed in the 1960s, which has been reported as a novel designer drug. In the UK its slang name is monkey dust. It is closely related to the potent stimulant MDPV though with slightly milder effects, and has been used as an alternative in some countries following the banning of MDPV.

== Pharmacology ==
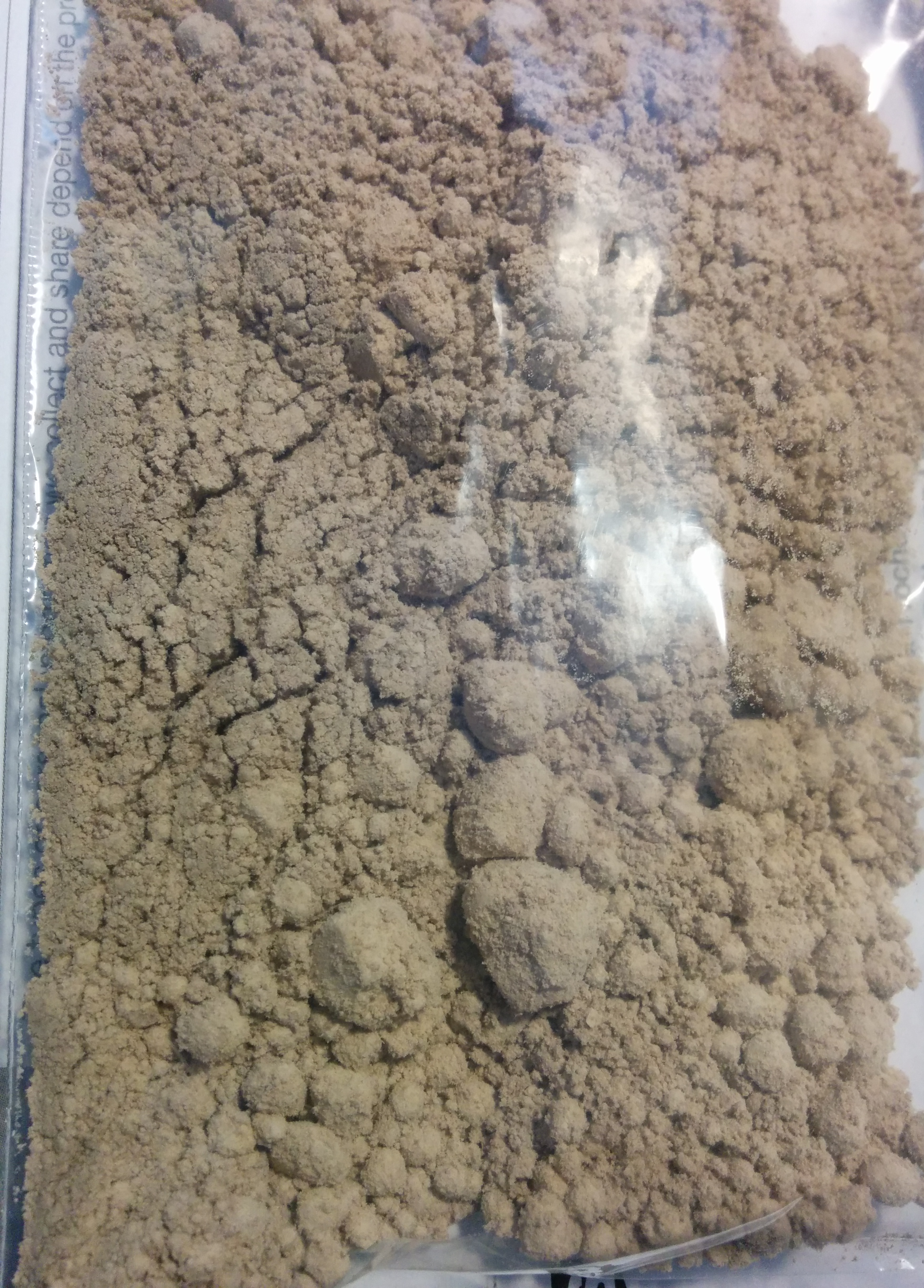
MDPHP powder

MDPHP acts as a potent norepinephrine-dopamine reuptake inhibitor. The IC50 values for MDPHP are 60-935 nM at NET, 8.4-50 nM at DAT and 9000 nM at SERT.

== Legal status ==
MDPHP is specifically listed as a controlled substance in Japan and Hungary, and is controlled under analogue provisions in a number of other jurisdictions.

== Documented fatalities ==
A case of a "fatal acute intoxication caused by MDPHP" in a 48 year old male was reported in February 2022 by doctors at an Italian hospital. Another case has been reported, involving a 30-years-old male cocaine user, found dead on 20 July 2023 in Florence, Italy.

== See also ==
- Substituted methylenedioxyphenethylamine
- α-Pyrrolidinohexiophenone (α-PHP)
- 3',4'-Methylenedioxy-α-pyrrolidinopropiophenone (MDPPP)
- 3F-PHP
- 4F-PHP
- 4-Cl-PHP
- 5-BPDi
- N-Ethylhexedrone
- N-Ethylhexylone
- MDPEP
