= 3F-PiHP =

Substituted cathinone stimulant drug

Legal status
- Legal status: CA: Schedule I; DE: NpSG (Industrial and scientific use only); UK: Class B; US: Unscheduled

Identifiers
- IUPAC name: 1-(3-fluorophenyl)-4-methyl-2-(pyrrolidin-1-yl)pentan-1-one
- PubChem CID: 163192825
- UNII: XZF8YZF3PN
- CompTox Dashboard (EPA): DTXSID101336908

Chemical and physical data
- Formula: C_{16}H_{22}FNO
- Molar mass: 263.356 g·mol^{−1}
- 3D model (JSmol): Interactive image
- SMILES: O=C(C(CC(C)C)N1CCCC1)C2=CC(F)=CC=C2

3F-PiHP (3F-α-PiHP) is a recreational designer drug from the substituted cathinone family, with stimulant effects. It was first identified in both Sweden and Finland in mid-2019, and was made illegal in Finland in August 2019.

== See also ==
- 3-Fluoromethcathinone
- 3F-NEH
- 3F-PVP
- 3F-PHP
- 4F-PHP
- α-PHiP
- α-PCyP
- Isohexylone
