= Pyrrolidinophenone =

Class of chemical compounds

Chemical structure of alpha-pyrrolidinopentiophenone

Pyrrolidinophenones are a class of stimulant recreational designer drugs including many substituted cathinones. The prototypical example is alpha-pyrrolidinopentiophenone (α-PVP).

Pyrrolidinophenones have psychostimulant effects and are associated with central nervous system and cardiovascular toxicities.
