= 3F-NEH =

Substituted cathinone stimulant drug

Identifiers
- IUPAC name: 2-(ethylamino)-1-(3-fluorophenyl)hexan-1-one
- PubChem CID: 163195773
- UNII: J86LFK6UP6
- CompTox Dashboard (EPA): DTXSID001337010

Chemical and physical data
- Formula: C_{14}H_{20}FNO
- Molar mass: 237.318 g·mol^{−1}
- 3D model (JSmol): Interactive image
- SMILES: O=C(c1cc(F)ccc1)C(CCCC)NCC

3F-NEH (3-Fluoro-N-Ethylhexedrone) is a recreational designer drug from the substituted cathinone family, with stimulant effects. It was first identified in Sweden in October 2020.

== See also ==
- 3-Fluoromethamphetamine
- 3-Fluoromethcathinone
- 3F-NEB
- 3F-PiHP
- 3F-PVP
- 3F-Phenmetrazine
- N-Ethylhexedrone
- N-Ethylhexylone
