= Cilobamine =

Chemical compound

Clinical data
- ATC code: none

Identifiers
- IUPAC name: (2R,3R)-2-(3,4-Dichlorophenyl)-3-[(1-methylethyl)amino]bicyclo[2.2.2]octan-2-ol
- CAS Number: 69429-84-1
- PubChem CID: 299379
- ChemSpider: 8557262
- UNII: 067U1T4S30
- ChEMBL: ChEMBL2106470

Chemical and physical data
- Formula: C_{17}H_{23}Cl_{2}NO
- Molar mass: 328.28 g·mol^{−1}
- 3D model (JSmol): Interactive image
- SMILES: Clc1ccc(cc1Cl)[C@@]3(O)[C@H](NC(C)C)C2CCC3CC2

Cilobamine is a drug which acts as a norepinephrine-dopamine reuptake inhibitor (NDRI) and has stimulant and antidepressant effects.

It can clearly be seen that the structure is based on dichloroisoprenaline that has been fused onto the bicycloalkane scaffold.

== See also ==
- Fencamfamine
- Manifaxine
