= Α-Pyrrolidinobutiophenone =

Stimulant drug

α-Pyrrolidinobutiophenone

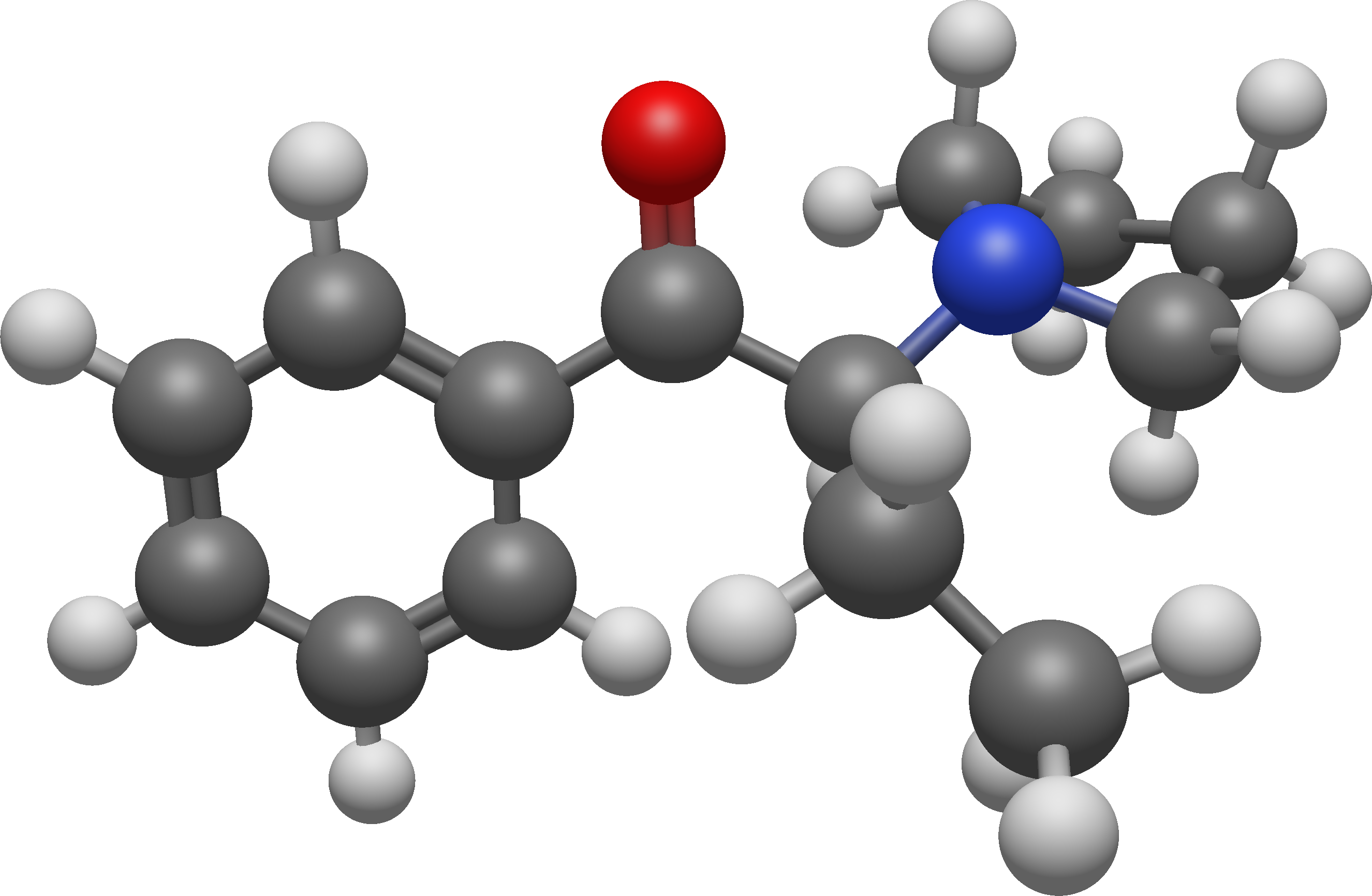

Legal status
- Legal status: DE: NpSG (Industrial and scientific use only); UK: Class B; US: Schedule I

Identifiers
- IUPAC name: (RS)-1-Phenyl-2-(1-pyrrolidinyl)-1-butanone
- CAS Number: 13415-82-2; HCl: 13415-54-8
- PubChem CID: 23199082
- ChemSpider: 16251917
- UNII: Y4B3AXV4I4; HCl: TVZ2316JM4
- CompTox Dashboard (EPA): DTXSID201016919 DTXSID40631251, DTXSID201016919

Chemical and physical data
- Formula: C_{14}H_{19}NO
- Molar mass: 217.312 g·mol^{−1}
- 3D model (JSmol): Interactive image
- SMILES: C2CCCN2C(CC)C(=O)c1ccccc1
- InChI: InChI=1S/C14H19NO/c1-2-13(15-10-6-7-11-15)14(16)12-8-4-3-5-9-12/h3-5,8-9,13H,2,6-7,10-11H2,1H3; Key:GSESDIFGJCCBHN-UHFFFAOYSA-N

α-Pyrrolidinobutiophenone (α-PBP) is a stimulant compound developed in the 1960s which has been reported as a novel designer drug. It can be thought of as the homologue lying between the two better known drugs α-PPP and α-PVP.

== Legality ==
In the United States, it is a Schedule I controlled substance.

Sweden's public health agency suggested to classify α-PBP as hazardous substance on November 10, 2014.

As of October 2015 α-PBP is a controlled substance in China.

== See also ==
- α-Pyrrolidinopropiophenone (α-PPP)
- α-Pyrrolidinopentiophenone (α-PVP)
- α-Pyrrolidinopentiothiophenone (α-PVT)
- α-Pyrrolidinohexiophenone (α-PHP)
- 4'-Methyl-α-pyrrolidinobutiophenone (MPBP)
- 3',4'-Methylenedioxy-α-pyrrolidinobutiophenone (MDPBP)
- Buphedrone
