= 3F-PVP =

Substituted cathinone stimulant drug

3-Fluoro-α-PVP

Legal status
- Legal status: CA: Schedule I; DE: NpSG (Industrial and scientific use only); UK: Class B

Identifiers
- IUPAC name: 1-(3-fluorophenyl)-2-(pyrrolidin-1-yl)pentan-1-one
- CAS Number: 2725852-55-9
- PubChem CID: 137700196
- ChemSpider: 107437100

Chemical and physical data
- Formula: C_{15}H_{20}FNO
- Molar mass: 249.329 g·mol^{−1}
- 3D model (JSmol): Interactive image
- SMILES: CCCC(C(=O)c1cccc(F)c1)N1CCCC1
- InChI: InChI=1S/C15H20FNO/c1-2-6-14(17-9-3-4-10-17)15(18)12-7-5-8-13(16)11-12/h5,7-8,11,14H,2-4,6,9-10H2,1H3; Key:GPAALPLKXRJJDE-UHFFFAOYSA-N

3-Fluoro-α-Pyrrolidinovalerophenone (3F-PVP) is a recreational designer drug from the substituted cathinone family with stimulant effects, which first appeared on the illicit market in around 2018. It is illegal in Finland.

== See also ==
- 3-Me-PVP
- 3-Fluoroamphetamine
- 3-Fluoromethamphetamine
- 3-Fluoroethamphetamine
- 3-Fluoromethcathinone
- 3-Fluorophenmetrazine
- 3F-NEB
- 3F-NEH
- 3F-PHP
- 3F-PiHP
- 4F-PVP
- 4Cl-PVP
- 4F-PHP
