= Α-Pyrrolidinohexiophenone =

Stimulant drug

α-Pyrrolidinohexiophenone

Clinical data
- Routes of administration: Oral, intranasal, vaporization, intravenous, rectal, sublingual, subcutaneous

Legal status
- Legal status: BR: Class F2 (Prohibited psychotropics); DE: Anlage II (Authorized trade only, not prescriptible); UK: Class B; US: Schedule I; UN: Psychotropic Schedule II; Illegal in China, Sweden and Italy

Identifiers
- IUPAC name: (RS)-1-Phenyl-2-(pyrrolidin-1-yl)hexan-1-one
- CAS Number: 13415-86-6; HCl: 13415-59-3
- PubChem CID: 102107923
- ChemSpider: 52084419
- UNII: 297J9K8A4G; HCl: Z5DJ7QN981
- KEGG: C22753
- CompTox Dashboard (EPA): DTXSID301016924

Chemical and physical data
- Formula: C_{16}H_{23}NO
- Molar mass: 245.366 g·mol^{−1}
- 3D model (JSmol): Interactive image
- SMILES: C1(=CC=CC=C1)C(C(CCCC)N2CCCC2)=O
- InChI: InChI=1S/C16H23NO/c1-2-3-11-15(17-12-7-8-13-17)16(18)14-9-5-4-6-10-14/h4-6,9-10,15H,2-3,7-8,11-13H2,1H3; Key:KYIJLDDXQWBNGX-UHFFFAOYSA-N

α-Pyrrolidinohexiophenone (α-PHP, A-PHP, Aphp, alpha-PHP, α-Pyrrolidinohexanophenone, PV-7) is a synthetic stimulant drug of the cathinone class developed in the 1960s which has been reported as a novel designer drug.

== Similar chemical compounds ==
α-Pyrrolidinohexiophenone is a longer chain homologue of α-PVP, having an extra carbon on the alkyl side chain. Regarding the potency of alpha-PHP in the brain, chemist Michael H. Baumann of the Designer Drug Research Unit (established by Baumann) of the National Institute on Drug Abuse stated: "alpha-PHP might be even more potent than alpha-PVP"; this statement is based on laboratory tests of chemical reactivity.

Pyrovalerone is a structural isomer of alpha-PHP.

== Pharmacology ==
⍺-PHP is a potent noradrenergic and dopaminergic reuptake inhibitor. ⍺-PHP is also an antagonist of muscarinic receptors.

Pharmacological Receptor Activity Profile of Novel Pyrovalerones Compared to Reference Amphetamines
Drug	NET	DAT	SERT	DAT/SERT Ratio
⍺-PVP	0.02 (0.01‒0.05)	0.03 (0.02‒0.04)	279 (209‒372)	>1000
⍺-PHP	0.06 (0.03‒0.12)	0.06 (0.05‒0.08)	245 (173‒348)	>1000
MDMA	0.41 (0.33‒0.52)	13 (11‒16)	1.6 (1.2‒2.2)	0.12 (0.08‒0.20)
Amphetamine	0.07 (0.05‒0.1)	1.3 (0.8‒2.0)	45 (24‒85)	35 (12‒106)

== Legality ==
The President of the Republic of Italy classified cathinone and all structurally derived analogues (including pyrovalerone analogues) as narcotics in January 2012.

Sweden's public health agency suggested to classify α-PHP as narcotic on June 1, 2015.

As of October 2015, α-PHP is a controlled substance in China.

In December 2019, the UNODC announced scheduling recommendations placing Alpha-PHP into Schedule II.

As of 29 October 2021, α-PHP has been banned in the Netherlands under the 1971 Vienna Convention on Psychotropic Substances.

In the US, a-PHP is a Schedule I controlled substance as of 2022.

== See also ==
- α-PHiP
- α-PHPP
- α-PBP
- α-PPP
- A-PCyP
- 4F-PHP
- 4-Cl-PHP
- 4-Methyl-α-PHP
- Prolintane
- Pyrovalerone
- MDPV
- MDPHP
