= Α-Pyrrolidinopropiophenone =

Chemical compound

α-Pyrrolidinopropiophenone

Legal status
- Legal status: DE: NpSG (Industrial and scientific use only); UK: Class B

Identifiers
- IUPAC name: (RS)-1-Phenyl-2-(1-pyrrolidinyl)-1-propanone
- CAS Number: 19134-50-0
- PubChem CID: 209045
- ChemSpider: 181124
- UNII: 01DP8CH58H
- CompTox Dashboard (EPA): DTXSID50897462

Chemical and physical data
- Formula: C_{13}H_{17}NO
- Molar mass: 203.285 g·mol^{−1}
- 3D model (JSmol): Interactive image
- SMILES: O=C(C(C)N1CCCC1)C2=CC=CC=C2
- InChI: InChI=1S/C13H17NO/c1-11(14-9-5-6-10-14)13(15)12-7-3-2-4-8-12/h2-4,7-8,11H,5-6,9-10H2,1H3; Key:KPUJAQRFIJAORQ-UHFFFAOYSA-N

α-Pyrrolidinopropiophenone (α-PPP), is a stimulant drug. It is similar in structure to the appetite suppressant diethylpropion and has analogous effects in animals. Little is known about this compound, but it has been detected by laboratories in Germany as an ingredient in "ecstasy" tablets seized by law enforcement authorities. This drug has been found to produce stimulant effects in animals and produces highly stimulating effects in humans, based on the experiences of the individuals who have tried it. Most of the individuals who have tried it prefer α-PVP to it, but prefer this drug over α-PVT. It is said to lack euphoria compared to α-PVP.

α-PPP is illegal in the UK under the blanket ban on substituted cathinones, and due to its structural similarity to illegal drugs such as methcathinone and pyrovalerone it might be considered a controlled substance analogue in some countries such as the US, Australia and New Zealand. Analogues of α-PPP such as pyrovalerone and MDPV have been more widely used and are presumed to be more potent and addictive than α-PPP itself. Structure-activity relationships of these drugs suggest that a variety of ring-substituted analogues are likely to be potential drugs of abuse, and stimulant activity has been found for analogues with between 3 and 6 carbon atoms in the alkyl chain. It has been shown to have neurotoxic effects in animals.

== See also ==
- 4'-Methyl-α-pyrrolidinopropiophenone (MePPP)
- 4'-Methoxy-α-pyrrolidinopropiophenone (MOPPP)
- 3,4-Methylenedioxy-α-pyrrolidinopropiophenone (MDPPP)
- 3',4'-Methylenedioxy-α-pyrrolidinobutiophenone (MDPBP)
- Alpha-Pyrrolidinopentiophenone (α-PVP)
- α-Pyrrolidinopentiothiophenone (α-PVT)
- α-Pyrrolidinohexiophenone (α-PHP)
