= Prolintane =

Stimulant and NDRI drug

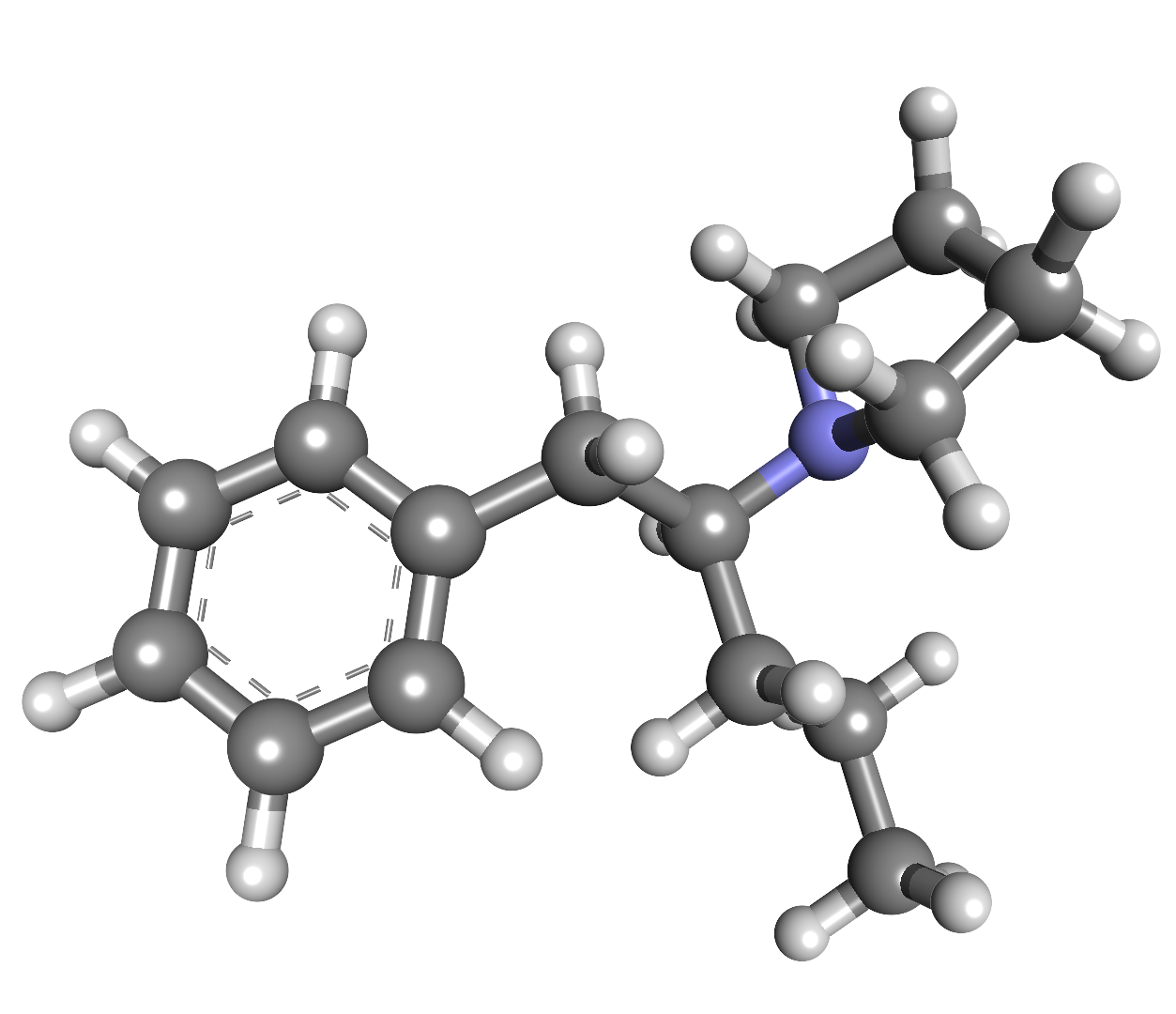

Clinical data
- Trade names: Catovit, Katovit, Promotil, Villescon
- Routes of administration: By mouth, intranasal, rectal
- Drug class: Stimulant; Norepinephrine–dopamine reuptake inhibitor (NDRI)
- ATC code: N06BX14 (WHO)

Legal status
- Legal status: AU: S4 (Prescription only); BR: Class B1 (Psychoactive drugs)

Identifiers
- IUPAC name: 1-(1-phenylpentan-2-yl)pyrrolidine
- CAS Number: 493-92-5
- PubChem CID: 14592
- ChemSpider: 13930
- UNII: EM4YZW677H
- ChEMBL: ChEMBL2111047
- CompTox Dashboard (EPA): DTXSID70862031
- ECHA InfoCard: 100.007.077

Chemical and physical data
- Formula: C_{15}H_{23}N
- Molar mass: 217.356 g·mol^{−1}
- 3D model (JSmol): Interactive image
- Melting point: 133 °C (271 °F)
- Boiling point: 153 °C (307 °F)
- SMILES: CCCC(N1CCCC1)CC2=CC=CC=C2
- InChI: InChI=1S/C15H23N/c1-2-8-15(16-11-6-7-12-16)13-14-9-4-3-5-10-14/h3-5,9-10,15H,2,6-8,11-13H2,1H3; Key:OJCPSBCUMRIPFL-UHFFFAOYSA-N

Prolintane is a central nervous system (CNS) stimulant and norepinephrine–dopamine reuptake inhibitor (NDRI) of the phenylalkylpyrrolidine family developed in the 1950s. Being an amphetamine derivative, it is closely related in chemical structure to other drugs such as pyrovalerone, MDPV, and propylhexedrine, and has a similar mechanism of action. Many cases of prolintane abuse have been reported.

Under the brand name Katovit, prolintane was commercialized by the Spanish pharmaceutical company FHER until 2001. It was most often used by students and workers as a stimulant to provide energy and increase alertness and concentration. Prolintane and substituted prolintane analogs (fluoro and methyl) show DAT and NET inhibition in the low nanomolar range, which is consistent with NDRI psychostimulants such a methylphenidate. In addition 4-substituted analogs have SERT inhibition which correlates with amphetamine SAR such as fenfluramine.

== See also ==
- α-PVP (β-ketone-prolintane, prolintanone)
- Methylenedioxypyrovalerone (MDPV)
- Pyrovalerone (Centroton, Thymergix)
- Phenylpropylaminopentane (PPAP)
