= Pyrovalerone =

Chemical compound

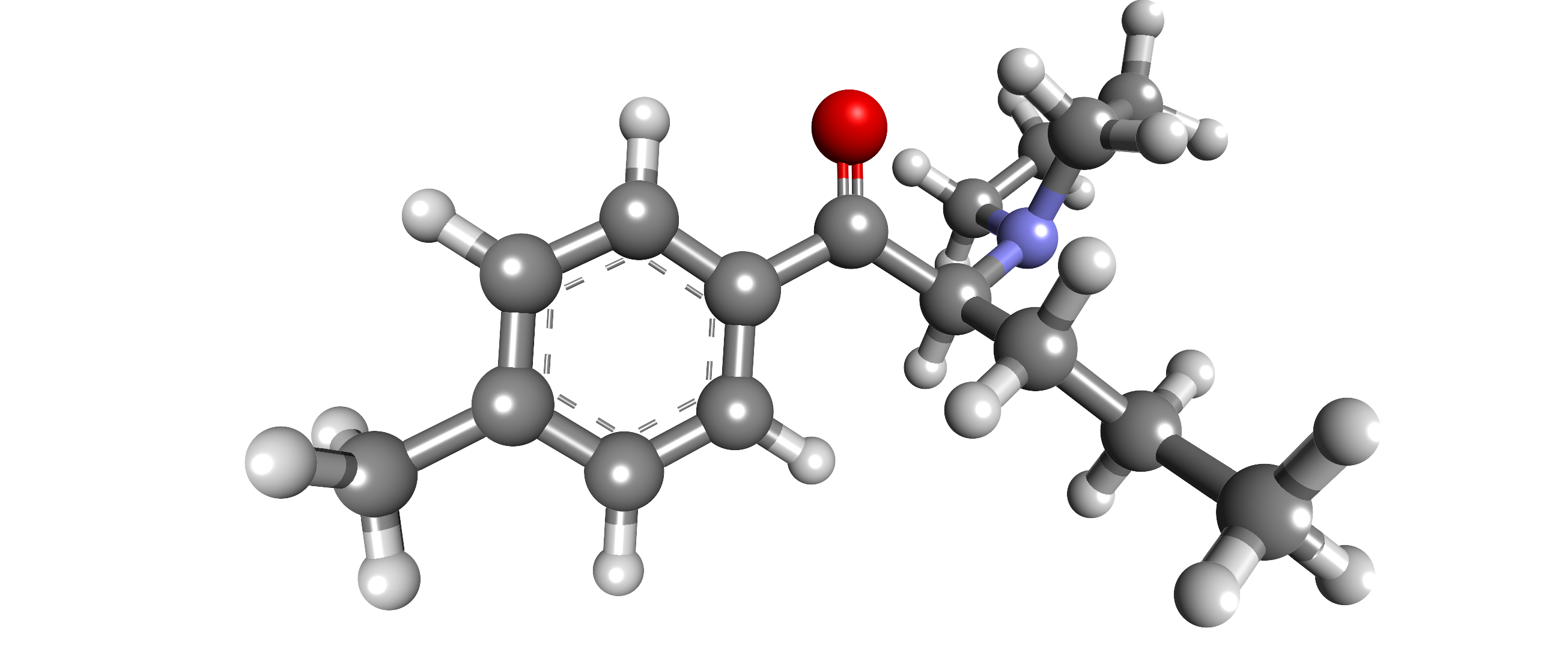

Clinical data
- Routes of administration: By mouth
- ATC code: none

Legal status
- Legal status: AU: S4 (Prescription only); BR: Class B1 (Psychoactive drugs); CA: Schedule IV; DE: Anlage II (Authorized trade only, not prescriptible); UK: Class C; US: Schedule V

Identifiers
- IUPAC name: (RS)-1-(4-methylphenyl)-2-(1-pyrrolidinyl)pentan-1-one
- CAS Number: 3563-49-3 1147-62-2 (hydrochloride)
- PubChem CID: 14373
- ChemSpider: 13733
- UNII: VOU69C02JP
- KEGG: D05663
- ChEMBL: ChEMBL201960
- CompTox Dashboard (EPA): DTXSID20863194
- ECHA InfoCard: 100.230.426

Chemical and physical data
- Formula: C_{16}H_{23}NO
- Molar mass: 245.366 g·mol^{−1}
- 3D model (JSmol): Interactive image
- Chirality: Racemic mixture
- SMILES: O=C(C(CCC)N1CCCC1)C2=CC=C(C)C=C2
- InChI: InChI=1S/C16H23NO/c1-3-6-15(17-11-4-5-12-17)16(18)14-9-7-13(2)8-10-14/h7-10,15H,3-6,11-12H2,1-2H3; Key:SWUVZKWCOBGPTH-UHFFFAOYSA-N

Pyrovalerone (Centroton, 4-Methyl-β-keto-prolintane, Thymergix, O-2371) is a central nervous system (CNS) stimulant that acts as a norepinephrine–dopamine reuptake inhibitor (NDRI). It was developed in the 1980s and had briefly been approved in Spain and France for chronic fatigue or lethargy and as an appetite suppressant, but was withdrawn from both markets around 2001 due to safety concerns including problems with abuse and dependence. It is closely related on a structural level to a number of other cathinone stimulants, such as α-PVP, MDPV and prolintane.

Side effects of pyrovalerone include decreased appetite, anxiety, fragmented sleep or insomnia, and trembling, shaking, or muscle tremors. Withdrawal symptoms following abuse upon discontinuation often results in depression.

The R-enantiomer of pyrovalerone is devoid of pharmacologic activity.

== See also ==
- 4-Et-PVP
- α-Pyrrolidinohexiophenone (α-PHP)
- α-Pyrrolidinopentiothiophenone (α-PVT)
- Methylenedioxypyrovalerone (MDPV)
- Naphyrone (O-2482)
- Prolintane (Promotil, Katovit)
- 4'-Methyl-α-pyrrolidinohexiophenone (MPHP, 4-MPHP)
