= Α-Pyrrolidinopentiophenone =

Chemical compound

α-Pyrrolidinopentiophenone

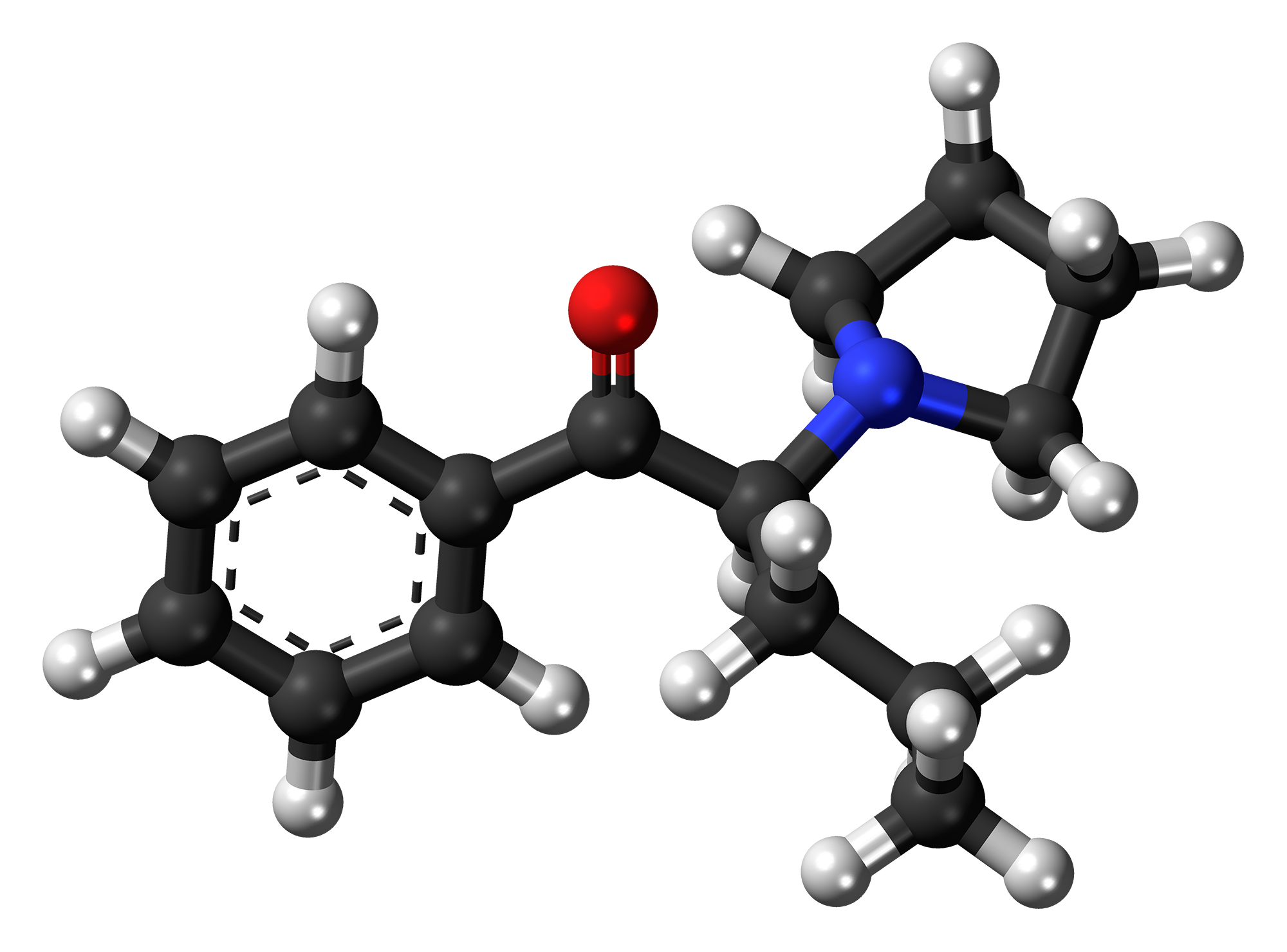

Clinical data
- Other names: α-Pyrrolidinovalerophenone; α-PVP; O-2387; β-Keto-prolintane; Prolintanone; Desmethylpyrovalerone
- Addiction liability: Very high
- Routes of administration: By mouth, intranasal, inhalation, sublingual, intravenous
- Drug class: Stimulant; Norepinephrine–dopamine reuptake inhibitor (NDRI)
- ATC code: None

Legal status
- Legal status: AU: S9 (Prohibited substance); BR: Class F2 (Prohibited psychotropics); CA: Unscheduled; DE: Anlage II (Authorized trade only, not prescriptible); NZ: Class C; UK: Class B; US: Schedule I; UN: Psychotropic Schedule II; SE: Förteckning I

Pharmacokinetic data
- Metabolites: α-PVP lactam, β-hydroxy α-PVP, and others
- Elimination half-life: ~2.1 hours
- Duration of action: 3–5 hours
- Excretion: In urine, through the kidneys

Identifiers
- IUPAC name: (RS)-1-Phenyl-2-(pyrrolidin-1-yl)pentan-1-one
- CAS Number: 14530-33-7
- PubChem CID: 11148955
- ChemSpider: 9324063
- UNII: 767K3AWA4R
- KEGG: C22754
- ChEBI: CHEBI:234463
- ChEMBL: ChEMBL205082
- CompTox Dashboard (EPA): DTXSID70456954

Chemical and physical data
- Formula: C_{15}H_{21}NO
- Molar mass: 231.339 g·mol^{−1}
- 3D model (JSmol): Interactive image
- SMILES: CCCC(C(C1=CC=CC=C1)=O)N2CCCC2
- InChI: InChI=1S/C15H21NO/c1-2-8-14(16-11-6-7-12-16)15(17)13-9-4-3-5-10-13/h3-5,9-10,14H,2,6-8,11-12H2,1H3; Key:YDIIDRWHPFMLGR-UHFFFAOYSA-N

α-Pyrrolidinovalerophenone (α-PVP), also known as α-pyrrolidinopentiophenone, O-2387, β-keto-prolintane, prolintanone, or desmethylpyrovalerone, or colloquially as flakka or gravel, is a synthetic stimulant of the cathinone class developed in the 1960s that has been sold as a designer drug and often consumed for recreational reasons. α-PVP is chemically related to pyrovalerone and is the ketone analog of prolintane.

== Use and effects ==
α-PVP is used by a variety of different routes of administration, including oral, insufflation, injection, vaporization, sublingual, and rectal. The dose range of α-PVP for therapeutic purposes was originally defined as 10 to 50 mg, with a most-suitable dose of 20 mg, whereas the recreational dose range is typically between 10 and 300 mg. The effects of α-PVP onset after 10 minutes, peak after 10 to 40 minutes, and last 2 to 3 hours.

The effects of α-PVP include cocaine-like psychostimulant effects, euphoria, elevated mood, alertness, pleasurable rush, feeling "sped up", mania-like symptoms, enhanced energy, motivation and productivity, enhanced music enjoyment, mild sexual stimulation, insomnia, paranoia, hallucinations, and increased aggression and violence. In emergency settings, commonly observed effects have included psychosis-like state, agitation, aggression, hallucinations, abnormal heart rate, and vomiting. It also produces sympathomimetic effects, such as increased heart rate and blood pressure.

== Adverse effects ==
α-PVP, like other stimulants, can cause hyperstimulation, paranoia, and hallucinations. α-PVP has been reported to be the cause, or a significant contributory cause of death in suicides and overdoses caused by combinations of drugs. α-PVP has also been linked to at least one death with pulmonary edema and moderately advanced atherosclerotic coronary artery disease when it was combined with pentedrone.

According to Craig Crespi in the journal Case Reports in Psychiatry, "symptoms are known to easily escalate into frightening delusions, paranoid psychosis, extreme agitation, and a multitude of other altered mental states." These common adverse effects of α-PVP are in line with other stimulants.

== Pharmacology ==
Pharmacological Receptor Activity Profile of Novel Pyrovalerones Compared to Reference Amphetamines
Drug	NET	DAT	SERT	DAT/SERT Ratio
⍺-PVP	0.02 (0.01‒0.05)	0.03 (0.02‒0.04)	279 (209‒372)	>1000
⍺-PHP	0.06 (0.03‒0.12)	0.06 (0.05‒0.08)	245 (173‒348)	>1000
MDMA	0.41 (0.33‒0.52)	13 (11‒16)	1.6 (1.2‒2.2)	0.12 (0.08‒0.20)
Amphetamine	0.07 (0.05‒0.1)	1.3 (0.8‒2.0)	45 (24‒85)	35 (12‒106)

=== Pharmacodynamics ===
α-PVP acts as a potent norepinephrine–dopamine reuptake inhibitor (NDRI), similarly to other NDRIs like methylphenidate, cocaine, and methylenedioxypyrovalerone (MDPV). Its IC_{50} values have been found to be 14 to 70 nM for norepinephrine reuptake inhibition and 13 to 80 nM for dopamine reuptake inhibition in rat brain synaptosomes and human embryonic kidney 293 (HEK293) cells expressing the monoamine transporters (MATs). In contrast to its effects on catecholamine reuptake, α-PVP has negligible effects on serotonin reuptake.

The drug is much more potent than amphetamine as an NDRI in in vitro, with 46-fold greater potency in terms of dopamine reuptake inhibition and 7-fold greater potency in terms of norepinephrine reuptake inhibition in HEK293 cells. It is one of the most potent dopamine reuptake inhibitors in vitro known.

Similarly to other cathinones, α-PVP has been shown to have stimulant-like effects (i.e., hyperlocomotion), reinforcing effects, and sympathomimetic effects in rodents.

=== Pharmacokinetics ===
The absorption of α-PVP is very rapid. In humans, the effects of the drug onset after 10 minutes, peak between 10 and 40 minutes, and last 2 to 3 hours.

α-PVP is said to be highly lipophilic due to its pyrrolidine ring, which in turn is said to markedly enhance its ability to permeate the blood–brain barrier relative to other cathinones.

The distribution, metabolism, and elimination of α-PVP have been studied.

== Chemistry ==
α-PVP gives no reaction with the Marquis reagent. It gives a grey/black reaction with the Mecke reagent.

=== Detection in body fluids ===
α-PVP may be quantified in blood, plasma, or urine by liquid chromatography-mass spectrometry to confirm a diagnosis of poisoning in hospitalized patients or to provide evidence in a medicolegal death investigation. Blood or plasma α-PVP concentrations are expected to be in a range of 10–50 μg/L in persons using the drug recreationally, >100 μg/L in intoxicated patients, and >300 μg/L in victims of acute overdosage.

== History ==
α-PVP was first described in the literature in 1963.

== Society and culture ==
=== Legal status ===
α-PVP is banned in Denmark, Estonia, Finland, France, Germany, Hungary, Russia, Ireland, Latvia, Lithuania, Netherlands, Poland, Romania, Slovenia, Sweden, the United Kingdom, Turkey, Norway, as well as the Czech Republic.

==== Australia ====
α-PVP is a Schedule 9 prohibited substance under the Poisons Standard (July 2016). A Schedule 9 substance is a substance which may be abused or misused, the manufacture, possession, sale or use of which should be prohibited by law except when required for medical or scientific research, or for analytical, teaching or training purposes with approval of Commonwealth and/or State or Territory Health Authorities. The drug was explicitly made illegal in New South Wales after it was illegally marketed with the imprimatur of erroneous legal advice that it was not encompassed by analog provisions of the relevant act. It is encompassed by those provisions, and therefore has been illegal for many years in New South Wales. The legislative action followed the death of two individuals from using it; one jumping off a balcony, another having a heart attack after a state of delirium.

==== China ====
As of October 2015, α-PVP is a controlled substance in China.

==== European Union ====
α-PVP was required to be banned by EU member states by 3 July 2017.

==== Italy ====
Cathinone and all structurally derived analogues (including pyrovalerone analogues) were classified as narcotics in January 2012.

==== United States ====
On January 28, 2014, the U.S. Drug Enforcement Agency (DEA) listed α-PVP, along with nine other synthetic cathinones, as a Schedule I controlled substance with a temporary ban, effective February 27, 2014. The temporary ban was then extended.

=== Economics ===
α-PVP is sometimes the active ingredient in recreational drugs sold as "bath salts". It may also be distinguished from "bath salts" and sold under different names: "flakka," a name commonly used in Florida, and "gravel" in other parts of the U.S. As of 2015, a-PVP is reportedly available for under $5 USD per dose. A laboratory for one county in Florida reported a steady rise in α-PVP detections in seized drugs from zero in January–February 2014 to 84 in September 2014.

== See also ==
- α-D2PV
- α-PCYP
- α-Pyrrolidinohexiophenone (α-PHP)
- α-Pyrrolidinopentiothiophenone (α-PVT)
- 4'-Methoxy-α-pyrrolidinopentiophenone
- Naphyrone (O-2482)
- Pentedrone
- Pentylone
- Prolintane
- Pyrovalerone (O-2371)
