= Methylenedioxypyrovalerone =

Chemical compound

MDPV

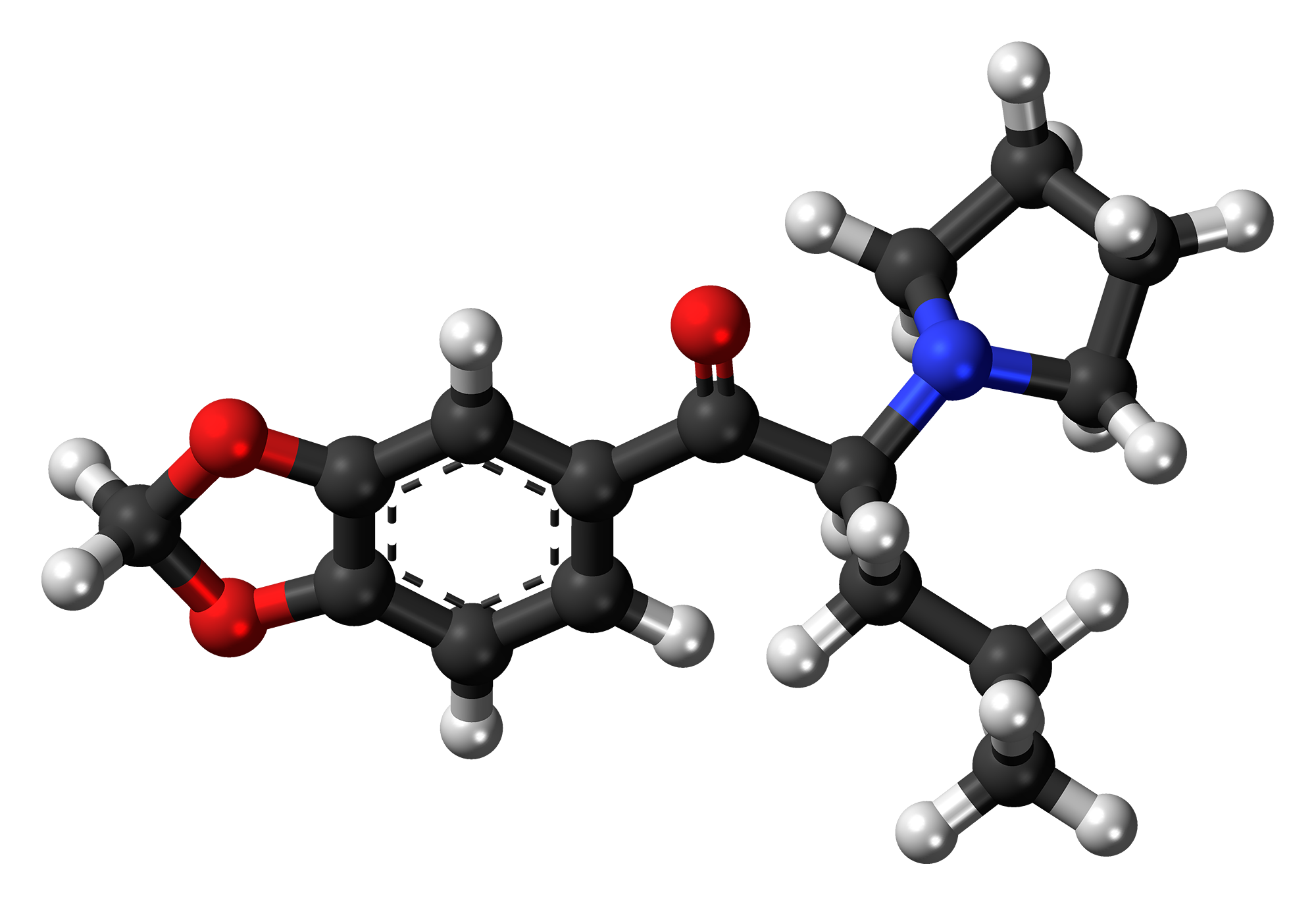

Clinical data
- Other names: MDPV; 3′,4′-Methylenedioxy-α-(pyrrolidin-1-yl)valerophenone; MDPK; MD-α-PVP
- Routes of administration: Oral, insufflation, intravenous, rectal, vaporization
- Drug class: Stimulant; Norepinephrine–dopamine reuptake inhibitor

Legal status
- Legal status: AU: S9 (Prohibited substance); BR: Class F1 (Prohibited narcotics); CA: Schedule I; DE: Anlage II (Authorized trade only, not prescriptible); UK: Class B; US: Schedule I; UN: Psychotropic Schedule II; Illegal in Austria, Belgium, Bulgaria, Croatia, Cyprus, Czech Republic, Denmark, Estonia, France, Hungary, Ireland, Finland, Italy, Latvia, Luxembourg, Norway, Poland, Portugal, Romania, Russia, Slovakia, Slovenia, Sweden, Turkey, Ukraine.

Pharmacokinetic data
- Metabolism: Hepatic
- Excretion: Primarily urine (renal)

Identifiers
- IUPAC name: 1-(1,3-Benzodioxol-5-yl)-2-(pyrrolidin-1-yl)pentan-1-one
- CAS Number: 687603-66-3 24622-62-6 (HCl)
- PubChem CID: 20111961
- ChemSpider: 16788110
- UNII: E7LD6JMR0L
- KEGG: C22808
- CompTox Dashboard (EPA): DTXSID90897461

Chemical and physical data
- Formula: C_{16}H_{21}NO_{3}
- Molar mass: 275.348 g·mol^{−1}
- 3D model (JSmol): Interactive image
- Chirality: Racemic mixture
- SMILES: O=C(C(CCC)N1CCCC1)C2=CC=C3C(OCO3)=C2
- InChI: InChI=1S/C16H21NO3/c1-2-5-13(17-8-3-4-9-17)16(18)12-6-7-14-15(10-12)20-11-19-14/h6-7,10,13H,2-5,8-9,11H2,1H3; Key:SYHGEUNFJIGTRX-UHFFFAOYSA-N

Methylenedioxypyrovalerone (MDPV) is a stimulant of the cathinone class that acts as a norepinephrine–dopamine reuptake inhibitor (NDRI).

== Use and effects ==
MDPV acts as a stimulant and has been reported to produce effects similar to those of cocaine, methylphenidate, and amphetamine.

The primary psychological effects have a duration of roughly 3 to 4 hours, with aftereffects such as tachycardia, hypertension, and mild stimulation lasting from 6 to 8 hours. High doses have been observed to cause intense, prolonged panic attacks in stimulant-intolerant users, and there are anecdotal reports of psychosis from sleep withdrawal and addiction at higher doses or more frequent dosing intervals. It has also been repeatedly noted to induce irresistible cravings to re-administer.

Reported modalities of intake include oral consumption, insufflation, smoking, rectal and intravenous use. It is supposedly active at doses of 3 to 5 mg, with typical doses ranging between 5 and 20 mg.

== Adverse effects ==
=== Long-term effects ===
The long-term effects of MDPV on humans have not been studied, but it has been reported that mice treated with MDPV during adolescence show reinforcing behavior patterns similar to cocaine that are higher than the control groups. These behavioural changes are related to alterations of factor expression directly related to addiction. All this suggests an increased vulnerability to cocaine abuse.

=== Documented fatalities ===
In April 2011, two weeks after being reported missing, two men in northwestern Pennsylvania were found dead in a remote location on government land. The official cause of death of both men was hypothermia, but toxicology reports later confirmed that both Troy Johnson, 29, and Terry Sumrow, 28, had ingested MDPV shortly before their deaths. "It wasn't anything to kill them, but enough to get them messed up," the county coroner said. MDPV containers were found in their vehicle along with spoons, hypodermic syringes and marijuana paraphernalia. In April 2011, an Alton, Illinois, woman apparently died from an MDPV overdose. In May 2011, the CDC reported a hospital emergency department (ED) visit after the use of "bath salts" in Michigan. One person was reported dead on arrival at the ED. Associates of the dead person reported that he had used bath salts. His toxicology results revealed high levels of MDPV in addition to marijuana and prescription drugs. The primary factor contributing to death was cited as MDPV toxicity after autopsy was performed. An incident of hemiplegia has been reported.

A total of 107 non-fatal intoxications and 99 analytically confirmed deaths related to MDPV between September 2009 and August 2013 were reported by nine European countries.

== Overdose ==
Physicians often treat MDPV overdose cases with anxiolytics, such as benzodiazepines, to lessen the drug-induced activity in the brain and body. In some cases, general anaesthesia was used because sedatives were ineffective.

Treatment in the emergency department for hypertensive emergency, tachycardia, agitation, or seizures consists of large doses of lorazepam in 2–4 mg increments every 10–15 minutes intravenously or intramuscularly. If this is not effective, haloperidol is an alternative treatment. It is suggested that the use of beta blockers to treat hypertension in these patients can cause an unopposed peripheral alpha-adrenergic effect with a dangerous paradoxical rise in blood pressure. Electroconvulsive therapy (ECT) has been shown to improve persistent psychotic symptoms associated with repeated MDPV use.

== Pharmacology ==
=== Pharmacodynamics ===
MDPV acts as a potent norepinephrine–dopamine reuptake inhibitor (NDRI). Its IC_{50} for monoamine reuptake inhibition were 4.1 nM for dopamine, 26 nM for norepinephrine, and 3,349 nM for serotonin in rat brain synaptosomes. Similarly, MDPV's IC_{50} values for monoamine reuptake inhibition were 10 nM for dopamine, 80 nM for norepinephrine, and 2,860 nM for serotonin in human embryonic kidney 293 (HEK293) cells expressing the monoamine transporters. Hence, its activity at the dopamine transporter is about six to eight times stronger than at the norepinephrine transporter and it is virtually inactive at the serotonin transporter. (S)-MDPV is the active enantiomer, whereas (R)-MDPV is far less potent.

MDPV is much more potent than amphetamine as an NDRI, with 23-fold higher potency for dopamine reuptake inhibition and 2.6-fold greater potency for norepinephrine reuptake inhibition in rat brain synaptosomes. With HEK293 cells expressing the monoamine transporters, MDPV was 568-fold more potent as a dopamine reuptake inhibitor and 12.5-fold more potent as a norepinephrine reuptake inhibitor than amphetamine. The drug is also far more potent as an NDRI than cocaine and mephedrone in both rat brain synaptosomes and HEK293 cells. MDPV is one of the most potent dopamine reuptake inhibitors in vitro or in vivo known. The only others that were more potent in vivo were desoxypipradrol (2-DPMP) and 3,4-dichloromethylphenidate (3-DCMP) and in vitro was α-PVP.

In addition to its monoamine reuptake inhibition, MDPV acts as a weakly efficacious partial norepinephrine–dopamine releasing agent (NDRA), with E_{max} values of 24% for both norepinephrine and dopamine in rat brain synaptosomes. However, MDPV failed to produce any dopamine, norepinephrine, or serotonin release at a concentration of 100,000 nM in HEK293 cells.

MDPV has no record of FDA approved medical use. It has been shown to produce robust reinforcing effects and compulsive self-administration in rats, though this had already been provisionally established by a number of documented cases of misuse and addiction in humans before the animal tests were carried out. When assayed in mice, repeated exposure to MDPV causes not only an anxiogenic effect but also increased aggressive behaviour, a feature that has already been observed in humans. As with MDMA, MDPV also caused a faster adaptation to repeated social isolation in rodents. A cross-sensitization between MDPV and cocaine has been evidenced. Furthermore, both psychostimulants, MDPV and cocaine, restore drug-seeking behavior with respect to each other, although relapse into drug-taking is always more pronounced with the conditioning drug. Moreover, memories associated with MDPV require more time to be extinguished. Also, in MDPV-treated mice, a priming-dose of cocaine triggers significant neuroplasticity, implying a high vulnerability to its abuse.

Similarly to other dopamine reuptake inhibitors like methylphenidate and bupropion, MDPV has been found to block methamphetamine-induced dopamine release in vitro. This is thought to be because substrate-type monoamine releasing agents like amphetamine and methamphetamine enter monoaminergic neurons via the monoamine transporters and then induce monoamine efflux intracellularly. By blocking the dopamine transporter, MDPV is thought to prevent access of these drugs into dopaminergic neurons and hence inhibits their dopamine release and associated effects.

=== Pharmacokinetics ===
==== Distribution ====
Permeability across the blood–brain barrier has been observed with cathinones like MDPV and mephedrone in vitro. The blood–brain barrier permeability of MDPV was found to be greater than that of amphetamine, methamphetamine, methcathinone, and mephedrone in vitro.

==== Metabolism ====
MDPV undergoes CYP450 2D6, 2C19, 1A2, and COMT phase 1 metabolism (liver) into methylcatechol and pyrrolidine, which in turn are glucuronated (uridine 5'-diphospho-glucuronosyl-transferase) allowing it to be excreted by the kidneys, with only a small fraction of the metabolites being excreted into the stools. No free pyrrolidine will be detected in the urine.

Molecularly, this is seen as demethylenation of methylenedioxypyrovalerone (CYP2D6), followed by methylation of the aromatic ring via catechol-O-methyl transferase. Hydroxylation of both the aromatic ring and side chain then takes place, followed by an oxidation of the pyrrolidine ring to the corresponding lactam, with subsequent detachment and ring opening to the corresponding carboxylic acid.

== Chemistry ==
=== Appearance ===
The hydrochloride salt exists as a very fine crystalline powder; it is hygroscopic and thus tends to form clumps, resembling something like powdered sugar. Its color can range from pure white to a yellowish-tan and has a slight odor that strengthens as it colors. Impurities are likely to consist of either pyrrolidine or alpha-dibrominated alkylphenones—respectively, from either excess pyrrolidine or incomplete amination during synthesis. These impurities likely account for its discoloration and fishy (pyrrolidine) or bromine-like odor, which worsens upon exposure to air, moisture, or bases.

=== Detection in biological specimens ===
MDPV may be quantified in blood, plasma or urine by gas chromatography-mass spectrometry or liquid chromatography-mass spectrometry to confirm a diagnosis of poisoning in hospitalized patients or to provide evidence in a medicolegal death investigation. Blood or plasma MDPV concentrations are expected to be in a range of 10–50 μg/L in persons using the drug recreationally, >50 μg/L in intoxicated patients, and >300 μg/L in victims of acute overdose.

=== Analogues ===
MDPV is the 3,4-methylenedioxy ring-substituted analogue of the compound pyrovalerone, developed in the 1980s, which has been used for the treatment of chronic fatigue and as an anorectic, but caused problems of abuse and dependence. Other drugs with a similar chemical structure include α-pyrrolidinopropiophenone (α-PPP), 4'-methyl-α-pyrrolidinopropiophenone (M-α-PPP), 3',4'-methylenedioxy-α-pyrrolidinopropiophenone (MDPPP) and 1-phenyl-2-(1-pyrrolidinyl)-1-pentanone (α-PVP).

== History ==
MDPV was first developed in the 1960s by a team at Boehringer Ingelheim. It remained an obscure stimulant until 2004 when it was reportedly sold as a designer drug. In the US, products containing MDPV and labeled as bath salts were sold as recreational drugs in gas stations, similar to the marketing for Spice and K2 as incense, until it was banned in 2011.

== Society and culture ==
=== Legal status ===
==== Australia ====
In Western Australia, MDPV has been banned under the Poisons Act 1964, having been included in Appendix A Schedule 9 of the Poisons Act 1964 as from February 11, 2012. The Director of Public Prosecutions for Western Australia announced that anyone intending to sell or supply MDPV faces a maximum $100,000 fine or 25 years in jail. Users face a $2000 fine or two years' jail. Therefore, anyone caught with MDPV can be charged with possession, selling, supplying or intent to sell or supply.

==== Canada ====
Canadian Health Minister Leona Aglukkaq announced on June 5, 2012, that MDPV would be listed on Schedule I of the Controlled Drugs and Substances Act, which was realized on September 26, 2012.

==== Finland ====
MDPV is specifically listed as a controlled substance in Finland (listed appendix IV substance as of June 28, 2010),

==== Sweden ====
In 2010, a 33-year-old Swedish man was sentenced to six years in prison by an appellate court, Hovrätt, for possession of 250 grams of MDPV that had been acquired prior to criminalization.

==== United Kingdom ====
In the UK, following the ACMD's report on substituted cathinone derivatives, MDPV is a Class B drug under The Misuse of Drugs Act 1971 (Amendment) Order 2010, making it illegal to sell, buy, or possess without a license.

==== United States ====
In the United States, MDPV is a DEA federally scheduled drug. On October 21, 2011, the DEA issued a temporary one-year ban on MDPV, classifying it as a schedule I substance. Schedule I status is reserved for substances with a high potential for abuse, no currently accepted use for treatment in the United States and a lack of accepted safety standards for use under medical supervision.

Before the federal ban was announced, MDPV was already banned in Louisiana and Florida. On March 24, 2011, Kentucky passed bill HB 121, which makes MDPV, as well as three other cathinones, controlled substances in the state. It also makes it a Class A misdemeanor to sell the drug, and a Class B misdemeanor to possess it.

MDPV is banned in New Jersey under Pamela's Law. The law is named after Pamela Schmidt, a Rutgers University student who was murdered in March 2011 by an alleged user of MDPV. A toxicology report later found no "bath salts" in his system.

On May 5, 2011, Tennessee Governor Bill Haslam signed a law making it a crime "to knowingly produce, manufacture, distribute, sell, offer for sale or possess with intent to produce, manufacture, distribute, sell, or offer for sale" any product containing MDPV.

On July 6, 2011, the governor of Maine signed a bill establishing fines for possession and penalties for trafficking of MDPV.

On October 17, 2011, an Ohio law banning synthetic drugs took effect barring selling and/or possession of "any material, compound, mixture, or preparation that contains any quantity of the following substances having a stimulant effect on the central nervous system, including their salts, isomers, and salts of isomers", listing ephedrine and pyrovalerone. It also specifically includes MDPV. Four days after this Ohio law was passed, the DEA's national emergency ban was implemented.

On December 8, 2011, under the Synthetic Drug Control Act, the US House of Representatives voted to ban MDPV and a variety of other synthetic drugs that had been legally sold in stores.

== See also ==
- Substituted methylenedioxyphenethylamine
- Substituted cathinone
- MDPBP
- MDPEP
- MDPHP
- MDPPP
- MPAP
- BOD-PVP
