= List of methylphenidate analogues =

3D molecular rendering of methylphenidate (MPH)

This is a list of methylphenidate (MPH or MPD) analogues, or Phenidates. The most well known compound from this family, methylphenidate, is widely prescribed around the world for the treatment of attention deficit hyperactivity disorder (ADHD) and certain other indications. Several other derivatives including rimiterol, phacetoperane and pipradrol also have more limited medical application. A rather larger number of these compounds have been sold in recent years as designer drugs, either as quasi-legal substitutes for illicit stimulants such as methamphetamine or cocaine, or as purported "study drugs" or nootropics.

More structurally diverse compounds such as desoxypipradrol (and thus pipradrol, including such derivatives as AL-1095, diphemethoxidine, SCH-5472 and D2PM), and even mefloquine, 2-benzylpiperidine, rimiterol, enpiroline and DMBMPP, can also be considered structurally related, with the former ones also functionally so, as loosely analogous compounds. The acyl group has sometimes been replaced with similar length ketones to increase duration. Alternatively, the methoxycarbonyl has in some cases been replaced with an alkyl group.

Dozens more phenidates and related compounds are known from the academic and patent literature, and molecular modelling and receptor binding studies have established that the aryl and acyl substituents in the phenidate series are functionally identical to the aryl and acyl groups in the phenyltropane series of drugs, suggesting that the central core of these molecules is primarily acting merely as a scaffold to correctly orientate the binding groups, and for each of the hundreds of phenyltropanes that are known, there may be a phenidate equivalent with a comparable activity profile. Albeit with the respective difference in their entropy of binding: cocaine being −5.6 kcal/mol and methylphenidate being −25.5 kcal/mol (Δs°, measured using [^{3}H]GBR 1278 @ 25 °C). (Note: ←Page #1,006 (82nd page of article) 2nd row, 1st ¶ (orig. ref.: Bonnet, J.-J.; Benmansour, S.; Costenin, J.; Parker, E. M.;Cubeddu, L. X. J. Pharmacol. Exp. Ther. 1990, 253, 1206))

== Notable phenidate derivatives ==
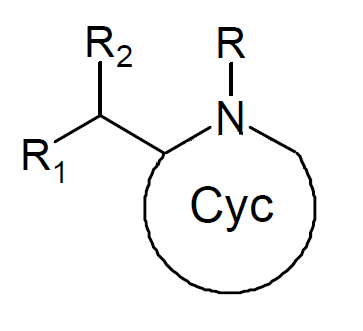
General structure of phenidate derivatives, where R is nearly always hydrogen but can be alkyl, R_{1} is usually phenyl or substituted phenyl but rarely other aryl groups, R_{2} is usually acyl but can be alkyl or other substitutions, and Cyc is nearly always piperidine but rarely other heterocycles

Structure	Common name	Chemical name	CAS #	R_{1}	R_{2}
	2-BZPD	2-Benzylpiperidine	32838-55-4	phenyl	H
	Ritalinic acid	Phenyl(piperidin-2-yl)acetic acid	19395-41-6	phenyl	COOH
	Ritalinamide	2-Phenyl-2-(piperidin-2-yl)acetamide	19395-39-2	phenyl	CONH_{2}
	Methylphenidate (MPH)	Methyl phenyl(piperidin-2-yl)acetate	113-45-1	phenyl	COOMe
	Phacetoperane (Lidépran)	[(R)-phenyl-[(2R)-piperidin-2-yl]methyl] acetate	24558-01-8	phenyl	OCOMe
	Rimiterol	4-{(S)-hydroxy[(2R)-piperidin-2-yl]methyl}benzene-1,2-diol	32953-89-2	3,4-dihydroxyphenyl	hydroxy
	Ethylphenidate (EPH)	Ethyl phenyl(piperidin-2-yl)acetate	57413-43-1	phenyl	COOEt
	Propylphenidate (PPH)	Propyl phenyl(piperidin-2-yl)acetate	1071564-47-0	phenyl	COOnPr
	Isopropylphenidate (IPH)	Propan-2-yl 2-phenyl-2-(piperidin-2-yl)acetate	93148-46-0	phenyl	COOiPr
	Butylphenidate (BPH)	Butyl phenyl(piperidin-2-yl)acetate		phenyl	COOnBu
	3-Chloromethylphenidate (3-Cl-MPH)	Methyl 2-(3-chlorophenyl)-2-(piperidin-2-yl)acetate	191790-73-5	3-chlorophenyl	COOMe
	3-Bromomethylphenidate (3-Br-MPH)	Methyl 2-(3-bromophenyl)-2-(piperidin-2-yl)acetate		3-bromophenyl	COOMe
	3-Methylmethylphenidate (3-Me-MPH)	Methyl 2-(3-methylphenyl)-2-(piperidin-2-yl)acetate		3-methylphenyl	COOMe
	4-Fluoromethylphenidate (4F-MPH)	Methyl 2-(4-fluorophenyl)-2-(piperidin-2-yl)acetate	1354631-33-6	4-fluorophenyl	COOMe
	4-Fluoroethylphenidate (4F-EPH)	Ethyl 2-(4-fluorophenyl)-2-(piperidin-2-yl)acetate	2160555-59-7	4-fluorophenyl	COOEt
	4-Fluoroisopropylphenidate (4F-IPH)	Propan-2-yl 2-(4-fluorophenyl)-2-(piperidin-2-yl)acetate		4-fluorophenyl	COOiPr
	4-Chloromethylphenidate (4-Cl-MPH)	Methyl 2-(4-chlorophenyl)-2-(piperidin-2-yl)acetate	680996-44-5	4-chlorophenyl	COOMe
	3,4-Dichloromethylphenidate (3,4-DCMP)	Methyl 2-(3,4-dichlorophenyl)-2-(piperidin-2-yl)acetate	1400742-68-8	3,4-dichlorophenyl	COOMe
	3,4-Dichloroethylphenidate (3,4-DCEP)	Ethyl 2-(3,4-dichlorophenyl)-2-(piperidin-2-yl)acetate		3,4-dichlorophenyl	COOEt
	4-Bromomethylphenidate (4-Br-MPH)	Methyl 2-(4-bromophenyl)-2-(piperidin-2-yl)acetate	203056-13-7	4-bromophenyl	COOMe
	4-Bromoethylphenidate (4-Br-EPH)	Ethyl 2-(4-bromophenyl)-2-(piperidin-2-yl)acetate	1391486-43-3	4-bromophenyl	COOEt
	4-Methylmethylphenidate (4-Me-MPH)	Methyl 2-(4-methylphenyl)-2-(piperidin-2-yl)acetate	191790-79-1	4-methylphenyl	COOMe
	4-Methylisopropylphenidate (4-Me-IPH)	Propan-2-yl 2-(4-methylphenyl)-2-(piperidin-2-yl)acetate		4-methylphenyl	COOiPr
	4-Nitromethylphenidate (4-NO2-MPH)	Methyl 2-(4-nitrophenyl)-2-(piperidin-2-yl)acetate		4-nitrophenyl	COOMe
	Methylenedioxymethylphenidate (MDMPH)	Methyl (1,3-benzodioxol-5-yl)(piperidin-2-yl)acetate		3,4-methylenedioxyphenyl	COOMe
	Methylnaphthidate (HDMP-28)	Methyl (naphthalen-2-yl)(piperidin-2-yl)acetate	231299-82-4	naphthalen-2-yl	COOMe
	Ethylnaphthidate (HDEP-28)	Ethyl (naphthalen-2-yl)(piperidin-2-yl)acetate	2170529-69-6	naphthalen-2-yl	COOEt
	Isopropylnaphthidate	Propan-2-yl (naphthalen-2-yl)(piperidin-2-yl)acetate		naphthalen-2-yl	COOiPr
	MTMP	Methyl (thiophen-2-yl)(piperidin-2-yl)acetate		thiophen-2-yl	COOMe
	α-acetyl-2-benzylpiperidine	1-Phenyl-1-(piperidin-2-yl)propan-2-one		phenyl	acetyl
	CPMBP	2-[1-(3-chlorophenyl)-3-methylbutyl]piperidine		3-chlorophenyl	isobutyl
	CTDP-32476	(2R)-2-[(1R)-1-(4-chlorophenyl)-3-methylbutyl]piperidine	928046-68-8	4-chlorophenyl	isobutyl
	Desoxypipradrol (2-DPMP)	2-benzhydrylpiperidine	519-74-4	phenyl	phenyl
	Pipradrol (Meratran)	Diphenyl(piperidin-2-yl)methanol	467-60-7	phenyl	hydroxy, phenyl
	3-FPO	5-[(3-fluorophenyl)-piperidin-2-ylmethyl]-3-methyl-1,2,4-oxadiazole		3-fluorophenyl	3-methyl-1,2,4-oxadiazol-5-yl
	4-FPO	5-[(4-fluorophenyl)-piperidin-2-ylmethyl]-3-methyl-1,2,4-oxadiazole	2743442-63-7	4-fluorophenyl	3-methyl-1,2,4-oxadiazol-5-yl
	4-MPO	5-[(4-methylphenyl)-piperidin-2-ylmethyl]-3-methyl-1,2,4-oxadiazole		4-methylphenyl	3-methyl-1,2,4-oxadiazol-5-yl

Related compounds

A number of related compounds are known which fit the same general structural pattern, but with substitution on the piperidine ring (e.g. SCH-5472, Difemetorex, N-benzylethylphenidate), or the piperidine ring replaced by other heterocycles such as pyrrolidine (e.g. diphenylprolinol, 2-Diphenylmethylpyrrolidine), morpholine (e.g. Methylmorphenate, 3-Benzhydrylmorpholine) or quinoline (e.g. AL-1095, Butyltolylquinuclidine).

Structure	Common name	Chemical name	CAS #
	SCH-5472	2-benzhydryl-1-methyl-piperidin-3-ol	20068-90-0
	Difemetorex	2-[2-(diphenylmethyl)piperidin-1-yl]ethanol	13862-07-2
	N-benzylethylphenidate	Ethyl (1-benzylpiperidin-2-yl)(phenyl)acetate	
	Serdexmethylphenidate	(1-((((R)-2-((R)-2-methoxy-2-oxo-1-phenylethyl)piperidine-1-carbonyl)oxy)methyl)pyridin-1-ium-3-carbonyl)-L-serinate chloride	1996626-30-2
	DMBMPP	2-(2,5-dimethoxy-4-bromobenzyl)-6-(2-methoxyphenyl)piperidine	1391499-52-7
	Diphenylprolinol (D2PM)	diphenyl(pyrrolidin-2-yl)methanol	22348-32-9
	2-Benzhydrylpyrrolidine	2-(Diphenylmethyl)pyrrolidine	119237-64-8
	HDMP-29	Methyl (naphthalen-2-yl)(pyrrolidin-2-yl)acetate	
	Methylmorphenate	Methyl morpholin-3-yl(phenyl)acetate	HCl salt: [2731021-63-7]
	3-Benzhydrylmorpholine	3-(diphenylmethyl)morpholine	93406-27-0
	AL-1095	2-(1-phenyl-1-(p-chlorophenyl)methyl)-3-hydroxyquinuclidine	54549-19-8
	Butyltolylquinuclidine	(2R,3S,4S)-2-butyl-3-p-tolylquinuclidine	
	2-Benzhydrylpiperazine		

== Isomerism ==
Alternate two dimensional rendering of "D-threo-methylphenidate"; demonstrating the plasticity of the piperidine ring in a 'flexed' or "chair" conformation. (the latter term can denote a structure containing a bridge in the ring when so-named, unlike the above). N.B. although the cyclohexane conformation, if considering both the hydrogen on the plain bond and the implicit carbon on the dotted bond are not shown as positioned as would be for the least energy state inherent to what rules apply, internally, to the molecule in and of itself: possibility of movement between putative other ligand sites in suchwise, here regarding what circumstance allows for describing it as "flexed" thus mean it has shown tendency for change in situ depending on its environment and adjacent sites of potential interaction as against its least energy state.

Methylphenidate (and its derivatives) have two chiral centers, meaning that it, and each of its analogues, have four possible enantiomers, each with differing pharmacokinetics and receptor binding profiles. In practice methylphenidate is most commonly used as pairs of diastereomers rather than isolated single enantiomers or a mixture of all four isomers. Forms include the racemate, the enantiopure (dextro or levo) of its stereoisomers; erythro or threo (either + or -) among its diastereoisomers, the chiral isomers S,S; S,R/R,S or R,R and, lastly, the isomeric conformers (which are not absolute) of either its anti- or gauche- rotamer. The variant with optimized efficacy is not the usually attested generic or common pharmaceutical brands (e.g. Ritalin, Daytrana etc.) but the (R,R)-dextro-(+)-threo-anti (sold as Focalin), which has a binding profile on par with or better than that of cocaine. (Note: ←Page #1,005 (81st page of article) §VI. Final ¶.) (Note however the measure of fivefold (5×) discrepancy in the entropy of binding at their presumed shared target binding site, which may account for the higher abuse potential of cocaine over methylphenidate despite affinity for associating; i.e the latter dissociates more readily once bound despite efficacy for binding. (Note: ←Page #1,006 (82nd page of article) 2nd column, end of first ¶.)) Furthermore, the energy to change between its two rotamers involves the stabilizing of the hydrogen bond between the protonated amine (of an 8.5 pK_{a}) with the ester carbonyl resulting in reduced instances of "gauche—gauche" interactions via its favoring for activity the "anti"-conformer for putative homergic-psychostimulating pharmacokinetic properties, postulating that one inherent conformational isomer ("anti") is necessitated for the activity of the threo diastereoisomer. (Note: ←Page #1,005 (81st page of article) Final § (§VI.) & page #1,006 (82nd page of article) left (1st) column, first ¶ and figure 51.)

Also of note is that methylphenidate in demethylated form is acidic; a metabolite (and precursor) known as ritalinic acid. This gives the potential to yield a conjugate salt form effectively protonated by a salt nearly chemically duplicate/identical to its own structure; creating a "methylphenidate ritalinate".

== Receptor binding profiles of selected methylphenidate analogues ==
=== Aryl substitutions ===
Phenyl ring substituted methylphenidate analogues (Note: ←Page #1,010 (86th page of article) Table 47, Page #1,007 (83rd page of article) Figure 52)
Compound	S. Singh's alphanumeric assignation (name)	R^{1}	R^{2}	IC_{50} (nM) (Inhibition of [^{3}H]WIN 35428 binding)	IC_{50} (nM) (Inhibition of [^{3}H]DA uptake)	Selectivity uptake/binding
	(D-threo-methylphenidate)	H, H		33	244 ± 142 (171 ± 10)	7.4
	(L-threo-methylphenidate)	H, H		540	5100 (1468 ± 112)	9.4
	(D/L-threo-methylphenidate) "eudismic ratio"	H, H		6.4	20.9 (8.6)	-
	(DL-threo-methylphenidate)	H, H		83.0 ± 7.9	224 ± 19	2.7
	(R-benzoyl-methylecgonine) (cocaine)	(H, H)		173 ± 13	404 ± 26	2.3
	351a (4F-MPH)	F	H y d r o g e n i.e. H	35.0 ± 3.0	142 ± 2.0	4.1
	351b	Cl	H y d r o g e n i.e. H	20.6 ± 3.4	73.8 ± 8.1	3.6
	351c	Br	H y d r o g e n i.e. H	6.9 ± 0.1	26.3 ± 5.8	3.8
	351d	(d) Br	H y d r o g e n i.e. H	-	22.5 ± 2.1	-
	351e	(l) Br	H y d r o g e n i.e. H	-	408 ± 17	-
	351d/e "eudismic ratio"	(d/l) Br	H y d r o g e n i.e. H	-	18.1	-
	351f	I	H y d r o g e n i.e. H	14.0 ± 0.1	64.5 ± 3.5	4.6
	351g	OH	H y d r o g e n i.e. H	98.0 ± 10	340 ± 70	3.5
	351h	OCH_{3}	H y d r o g e n i.e. H	83 ± 11	293 ± 48	3.5
	351i	(d) OCH_{3}	H y d r o g e n i.e. H	-	205 ± 10	-
	351j	(l) OCH_{3}	H y d r o g e n i.e. H	-	3588 ± 310	-
	351i/j "eudismic ratio"	(d/l) OCH_{3}	H y d r o g e n i.e. H	-	17.5	-
	351k (4-Me-MPH)	CH_{3}	H y d r o g e n i.e. H	33.0 ± 1.2	126 ± 1	3.8
	351l	t-Bu	H y d r o g e n i.e. H	13500 ± 450	9350 ± 950	0.7
	351m	NH_{2}.HCl	H y d r o g e n i.e. H	34.6 ± 4.0	115 ± 10	3.3
	351n	NO_{2}	H y d r o g e n i.e. H	494 ± 33	1610 ± 210	3.3
	352a	F	H y d r o g e n i.e. H	40.5 ± 4.5	160 ± 0.00	4.0
	352b	Cl	H y d r o g e n i.e. H	5.1 ± 1.6	23.0 ± 3.0	4.5
	352c	Br	H y d r o g e n i.e. H	4.2 ± 0.2	12.8 ± 0.20	3.1
	352d	OH	H y d r o g e n i.e. H	321 ± 1.0	790 ± 30	2.5
	352e	OMe	H y d r o g e n i.e. H	288 ± 53	635 ± 35	0.2
	352f	Me	H y d r o g e n i.e. H	21.4 ± 1.1	100 ± 18	4.7
	352g	NH_{2}.HCl	H y d r o g e n i.e. H	265 ± 5	578 ± 160	2.2
	353a	2′-F	H y d r o g e n i.e. H	1420 ± 120	2900 ± 300	2.1
	353b	2′-Cl	H y d r o g e n i.e. H	1950 ± 230	2660 ± 140	1.4
	353c	2′-Br	H y d r o g e n i.e. H	1870 ± 135	3410 ± 290	1.8
	353d	2′-OH	H y d r o g e n i.e. H	23100 ± 50	35,800 ± 800	1.6
	353e	2′-OCH_{3}	H y d r o g e n i.e. H	101,000 ± 10,000	81,000 ± 2000	0.8
	354a (3,4-DCMP)	Cl, Cl (3′,4′-Cl_{2})		5.3 ± 0.7	7.0 ± 0.6	1.3
	354b	I	OH	42 ± 21	195 ± 197	4.6
	354c	OMe, OMe (3′,4′-OMe_{2})		810 ± 10	1760 ± 160	2.2

=== Aryl exchanged analogues ===
Phenyl ring modified methylphenidate analogues (Note: ←Page #1,010 (86th page of article) Table 49, Page #1,007 (83rd page of article) Figure 54)
Compound	S. Singh's alphanumeric assignation (name)	Ring	K_{i} (nM) (Inhibition of [^{125}I]IPT binding)	K_{i} (nM) (Inhibition of [^{3}H]DA uptake)	Selectivity uptake/binding
	(D-threo-methylphenidate)	benzene	324	-	-
	(DL-threo-methylphenidate)	benzene	82 ± 77	429 ± 88	0.7
	374	1-naphthalene	194 ± 15	1981 ± 443	10.2
	375 (HDMP-28)	2-naphthalene	79.5	85.2 ± 25	1.0
	376	benzyl	>5000	-	-

Both analogues 374 & 375 displayed higher potency than methylphenidate at DAT. In further comparison, 375 (the 2-naphthyl) was additionally two & a half times more potent than 374 (the 1-naphthyl isomer). (Note: ←Page #1,010 (86th page of article) 2nd ¶, lines 2, 3 & 5.)

HDMP-29, a manifold (multiple augmented) analogue of both the phenyl (to a 2-naphthalene) and piperidine (to a 2-pyrrolidine) rings.

=== Piperidine nitrogen methylated phenyl-substituted variants ===
N-methyl phenyl ring substituted methylphenidate analogues (Note: ←Page #1,010 (86th page of article) Table 48, Page #1,007 (83rd page of article) Figure 53)
Compound	S. Singh's alphanumeric assignation (name)	R	IC_{50} (nM) (Inhibition of binding at DAT)
	373a	H	500 ± 25
	373b	4″-OH	1220 ± 140
	373c	4″-CH_{3}	139 ± 13
	373d	3″-Cl	161 ± 18
	373e	3″-Me	108 ± 16

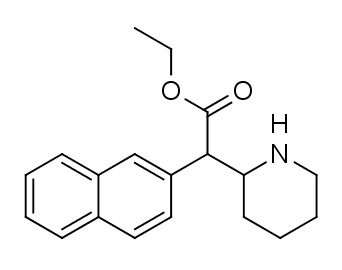
HDEP-28, Ethylnaphthidate.

=== Cycloalkane extensions, contractions & modified derivatives ===
Piperidine ring modified methylphenidate analogues (Note: ←Page #1,011 (87th page of article) Table 50, Page #1,007 (83rd page of article) Figure 55)
Compound	S. Singh's alphanumeric assignation (name)	Cycloalkane ring	K_{i} (nM) (Inhibition of binding)
	380	2-pyrrolidine (cyclopentane)	1336 ± 108
	381	2-azepane (cycloheptane)	1765 ± 113
	382	2-azocane (cyclooctane)	3321 ± 551
	383	4-1,3-oxazinane (cyclohexane)	6689 ± 1348

Methyl 2-(1,2-oxazinan-3-yl)-2-phenylacetate
Methyl 2-(1,3-oxazinan-2-yl)-2-phenylacetate
The two other (in addition to compound 383) potential oxazinane methylphenidate analogues.

Methyl 2-phenyl-2-(morpholin-3-yl)acetate A.K.A. Methyl 2-morpholin-3-yl-2-phenylacetate	☜Methylmorphenate methylphenidate analogue.

=== Azido-iodo-N-benzyl analogues ===
Structures of Azido-iodo-N-benzyl analogues of methylphenidate with affinities.

Azido-iodo-N-benzyl methylphenidate analogs inhibitition of [^{3}H]WIN 35428 binding and [^{3}H]dopamine uptake at hDAT N2A neuroblastoma cells. (Each K_{i} or IC_{50} value represents data from at least three independent experiments with each data point on the curve performed in duplicate)
Structure	Compound	R^{1}	R^{2}	K_{i} (nM) (Inhibition of [^{3}H]WIN 35428 binding)	IC_{50} (nM) (Inhibition of [^{3}H]DA uptake)
	(±)—threo-methylphenidate	H	H	25 ± 1	156 ± 58
	(±)—4-I-methylphenidate	para-iodo	H	14 ± 3^{ɑ}	11 ± 2^{b}
	(±)—3-I-methylphenidate	meta-iodo	H	4.5 ± 1^{ɑ}	14 ± 5^{b}
	(±)—p-N_{3}-N-Bn-4-I-methylphenidate	para-iodo	para-N_{3}-N-Benzyl	363 ± 28^{ɑ}	2764 ± 196^{bc}
	(±)—m-N_{3}-N-Bn-4-I-methylphenidate	para-iodo	meta-N_{3}-N-Benzyl	2754 ± 169^{ɑ}	7966 ± 348^{bc}
	(±)—o-N_{3}-N-Bn-4-I-methylphenidate	para-iodo	ortho-N_{3}-N-Benzyl	517 ± 65^{ɑ}	1232 ± 70^{bc}
	(±)—p-N_{3}-N-Bn-3-I-methylphenidate	meta-iodo	para-N_{3}-N-Benzyl	658 ± 70^{ɑ}	1828 ± 261^{bc}
	(±)—m-N_{3}-N-Bn-3-I-methylphenidate	meta-iodo	meta-N_{3}-N-Benzyl	2056 ± 73^{ɑ}	4627 ± 238^{bc}
	(±)—o-N_{3}-N-Bn-3-I-methylphenidate	meta-iodo	ortho-N_{3}-N-Benzyl	1112 ± 163^{ɑ}	2696 ± 178^{bc}
	(±)—N-Bn-methylphenidate	H	N-Benzyl	—	—
	(±)—N-Bn-3-chloro-methylphenidate	3-Cl	N-Benzyl	—	—
	(±)—N-Bn-3,4-dichloro-methylphenidate	3,4-diCl	N-Benzyl	—	—
	(±)—p-chloro-N-Bn-methylphenidate	H	para-Cl-N-Benzyl	—	—
	(±)—p-methoxy-N-Bn-methylphenidate	H	para-OMe-N-Benzyl	—	—
	(±)—m-chloro-N-Bn-methylphenidate	H	meta-Cl-N-Benzyl	—	—
	(±)—p-nitro-N-Bn-methylphenidate	H	para-NO_{2}-N-Benzyl	—	—

- ^{ɑ} p <0.05 versus K_{i} of (±)—threo-methylphenidate.
- ^{b} p <0.05 versus IC_{50} of (±)—threo-methylphenidate.
- ^{c} p <0.05 versus its corresponding K_{i}.
Additional arene/nitrogen-linked MPH analogs

ChEMBL1254008

ChEMBL1255099

=== Alkyl substituted-carbomethoxy analogues ===
Alkyl RR/SS diastereomer analogs of methylphenidate (RS/SR diastereomer values of otherwise same compounds given in small grey typeface)
Structure	R^{1}	R^{2}	R^{3}	Dopamine transporter K_{i} (nM) (Inhibition of [I^{125}H]RTI-55 binding)	DA uptake IC_{50} (nM)	Serotonin transporter K_{i} (nM) (Inhibition of [I^{125}H]RTI-55 binding)	5HT uptake IC_{50} (nM)	Norepinephrine transporter K_{i} (nM) (Inhibition of [I^{125}H]RTI-55 binding)	NE uptake IC_{50} (nM)	NE/DA selectivity (binding displacement)	NE/DA selectivity (uptake blocking)
Cocaine	—^{ɑ}	—^{b}	—^{c}	500 ± 65	240 ± 15	340 ± 40	250 ± 40	500 ± 90	210 ± 30	1.0	0.88
	H	COOCH_{3}	H	110 ± 9	79 ± 16	65,000 ± 4,000	5,100 ± 7,000	660 ± 50	61 ± 14	6.0	0.77
	4-chloro	COOCH_{3}	H	25 ± 8; 2,000 ± 600	11 ± 28; 2,700 ± 1,000	6,000 ± 100; 5,900 ± 200	>9,800 >10 mM	110 ± 40 >6,100	11 ± 3; 1,400 ± 400	4.4	1.0
	4-chloro	methyl	H	180 ± 70 >3,900	22 ± 7; 1,500 ± 700	4,900 ± 500 >9,100	1,900 ± 300; 4,700 ± 800	360 ± 140 >6,300	35 ± 13; 3,200 ± 800	2.0	1.6
	4-chloro	ethyl	H	37 ± 10; 1,800 ± 300	23 ± 5; 2,800 ± 700	7,800 ± 800; 4,200 ± 400	2,400 ± 400; 4,100 ± 1,000	360 ± 60 >9,200	210 ± 30; 1,300 ± 400	9.7	9.1
	4-chloro	propyl	H	11 ± 3; 380 ± 40	7.4 ± 0.4; 450 ± 60	2,700 ± 600; 3,200 ± 1,100	2,900 ± 1,100; 1,300 ± 7	200 ± 80; 1,400 ± 400	50 ± 15; 200 ± 50	18.0	6.8
	4-chloro	isopropyl	H	46 ± 16; 900 ± 320	32 ± 6; 990 ± 280	5,300 ± 1,300 >10 mM	3,300 ± 400 —	810 ± 170 >10 mM	51 ± 20 —	18.0	1.6
	4-chloro	butyl	H	7.8 ± 1.1; 290 ± 70	8.2 ± 2.1; 170 ± 40	4,300 ± 400; 4,800 ± 700	4,000 ± 400; 3,300 ± 600	230 ± 30; 1,600 ± 300	26 ± 7; 180 ± 60	29.0	3.2
	4-chloro	isobutyl	H	16 ± 4; 170 ± 50	8.6 ± 2.9; 380 ± 130	5,900 ± 900; 4,300 ± 500	490 ± 80; 540 ± 150	840 ± 130; 4,500 ± 1,500	120 ± 40; 750 ± 170	53.0	14.0
	4-chloro	pentyl	H	23 ± 7; 870 ± 140	45 ± 14; 650 ± 20	2,200 ± 100; 3,600 ± 1,000	1,500 ± 300; 1,700 ± 700	160 ± 40; 1,500 ± 300	49 ± 16; 860 ± 330	7.0	1.1
	4-chloro	isopentyl	H	3.6 ± 1.2; 510 ± 170	14 ± 2; 680 ± 120	5,000 ± 470; 6,700 ± 500	7,300 ± 1,400 >8,300	830 ± 110; 12,000 ± 1,400	210 ± 40; 3,000 ± 540	230.0	15.0
	4-chloro	neopentyl	H	120 ± 40; 600 ± 40	60 ± 2; 670 ± 260	3,900 ± 500; 3,500 ± 1,000	>8,300; 1,800 ± 600	1,400 ± 400 >5,500	520 ± 110; 730 ± 250	12.0	8.7
	4-chloro	cyclopentylmethyl	H	9.4 ± 1.5; 310 ± 80	21 ± 1; 180 ± 20	2,900 ± 80; 3,200 ± 700	2,100 ± 900; 5,600 ± 1,400	1,700 ± 600; 2,600 ± 800	310 ± 40; 730 ± 230	180.0	15.0
	4-chloro	cyclohexylmethyl	H	130 ± 40; 260 ± 30	230 ± 70; 410 ± 60	900 ± 400; 3,700 ± 500	1,000 ± 200; 6,400 ± 1,300	4,200 ± 200; 4,300 ± 200	940 ± 140; 1,700 ± 600	32.0	4.1
	4-chloro	benzyl	H	440 ± 110; 550 ± 60	370 ± 90; 390 ± 60	1,100 ± 200; 4,300 ± 800	1,100 ± 200; 4,700 ± 500	2,900 ± 800; 4,000 ± 800	2,900 ± 600 >8,800	6.6	7.8
	4-chloro	phenethyl	H	24 ± 9; 700 ± 90	160 ± 20; 420 ± 140	640 ± 60; 1,800 ± 70	650 ± 210; 210 ± 900^{d}	1,800 ± 600; 2,400 ± 700	680 ± 240; 610 ± 150	75.0	4.3
	4-chloro	phenpropyl	H	440 ± 150; 2,900 ± 900	290 ± 90; 1,400 ± 400	700 ± 200; 1,500 ± 200	1,600 ± 300; 1,200 ± 400	490 ± 100; 1,500 ± 200	600 ± 140; 1,700 ± 200	1.1	2.1
	4-chloro	3-pentyl	H	400 ± 80 >5,700	240 ± 60; 1,200 ± 90	3,900 ± 300; 4,800 ± 1,100	>9,400 >9,600	970 ± 290; 4,300 ± 200	330 ± 80; 3,800 ± 30	2.4	1.4
	4-chloro	cyclopentyl	H	36 ± 10; 690 ± 140	27 ± 8.3; 240 ± 30	5,700 ± 1,100; 4,600 ± 700	4,600 ± 800; 4,200 ± 900	380 ± 120; 3,300 ± 800	44 ± 18; 1,000 ± 300	11.0	1.6
	3-chloro	isobutyl	H	3.7 ± 1.1; 140 ± 30	2.8 ± 0.4; 88 ± 12	3,200 ± 400; 3,200 ± 400	2,100 ± 100; 870 ± 230	23 ± 6; 340 ± 50	14 ± 1; 73 ± 5	6.2	5.0
	3,4-dichloro	COOCH_{3}	H	1.4 ± 0.1; 90 ± 14	23 ± 3; 800 ± 110	1,600 ± 150; 2,500 ± 420	540 ± 110; 1,100 ± 90	14 ± 6; 4,200 ± 1,900	10 ± 1; 190 ± 50	10.0	0.43
	3,4-dichloro	propyl	H	0.97 ± 0.31; 43 ± 9	4.5 ± 0.4; 88 ± 32	1,800 ± 500; 450 ± 80	560 ± 120; 180 ± 60	3.9 ± 1.4; 30 ± 8	8.1 ± 3.8; 47 ± 22	4.0	1.8
	3,4-dichloro	butyl	H	2.3 ± 0.2; 29 ± 5	5.7 ± 0.5; 67 ± 13	1,300 ± 300; 1,100 ± 200	1,400 ± 300; 550 ± 80	12 ± 3; 31 ± 11	27 ± 10; 63 ± 27	5.2	4.7
	3,4-dichloro	isobutyl	H	1.0 ± 0.5; 31 ± 11	5.5 ± 1.3; 13 ± 3	1,600 ± 100; 450 ± 40	1,100 ± 300; 290 ± 60	25 ± 9; 120 ± 30	9.0 ± 1.2; 19 ± 3	25.0	1.6
	3,4-dichloro	isobutyl	CH_{3}	6.6 ± 0.9; 44 ± 12	13 ± 4; 45 ± 4	1,300 ± 200; 1,500 ± 300	1,400 ± 500; 2,400 ± 700	190 ± 60; 660 ± 130	28 ± 3; 100 ± 19	29.0	2.2
	4-methoxy	isobutyl	H	52 ± 16; 770 ± 220	25 ± 9; 400 ± 120	2,800 ± 600; 950 ± 190	3,500 ± 500; 1,200 ± 300	3,100 ± 200; 16,000 ± 2,000	410 ± 90; 1,600 ± 400	60.0	16.0
	3-methoxy	isobutyl	H	22 ± 5; 950 ± 190	35 ± 12; 140 ± 20	4,200 ± 400; 3,800 ± 600	2,700 ± 800; 2,600 ± 300	3,800 ± 500; 12,000 ± 2,300	330 ± 40; 1,400 ± 90	170.0	9.4
	4-isopropyl	isobutyl	H	3,300 ± 600 >6,500	4,000 ± 400 >9,100	3,300 ± 600; 1,700 ± 500	4,700 ± 700; 1,700 ± 100	2,500 ± 600; 3,200 ± 600	7,100 ± 1,800 >8,700	0.76	1.8
	H	COCH_{3}	H	370 ± 70	190 ± 50	7,800 ± 1,200	>9,700	2,700 ± 400	220 ± 30	7.3	1.2

- ^{ɑ} H = Equivalent overlay of structure sharing functional group
- ^{b} CO_{2}CH_{3} (i.e. COOCH_{3}) = Equivalent overlay of structure sharing functional group
- ^{c} CH_{3} = Equivalent overlay of structure sharing functional group
- ^{d} possible typographical error in original source; e.g. 2,100 ± 900 or 900 ± 210

== Restricted rotational analogs of methylphenidate (quinolizidines) ==
Two of the compounds tested, the weakest two @ DAT & second to the final two on the table below, were designed to elucidate the necessity of both constrained rings in the efficacy of the below series of compounds at binding by removing one or the other of the two rings in their entirety. The first of the two retain the original piperidine ring had with methylphenidate but has the constrained B ring that is common to the restricted rotational analogues thereof removed. The one below lacks the piperdine ring native to methylphenidate but keeps the ring that hindered the flexibility of the original MPH conformation. Though their potency at binding is weak in comparison to the series, with the potency shared being approximately equal between the two; the latter compound (the one more nearly resembling the substrate class of dopaminergic releasing agents similar to phenmetrazine) is 8.3-fold more potent @ DA uptake.

Binding assays^{g} of rigid methylphenidate analogues
Compound^{ɑ}	R & X substitution(s)	K_{i} (nM) @ DAT with [^{3}3]WIN 35,065-2	n_{H} @ DAT with [^{3}3]WIN 35,065-2	K_{i} (nM) or % inhibition @ NET with [^{3}3]Nisoxetine	n_{H} @ NET with [^{3}3]Nisoxetine	K_{i} (nM) or % inhibition @ 5-HTT with [^{3}3]Citalopram	n_{H} @ 5-HTT with [^{3}3]Citalopram	[^{3}3]DA uptake IC_{50} (nM)	Selectivity [^{3}3]Citalopram / [^{3}3]WIN 35,065-2	Selectivity [^{3}3]Nisoxetine / [^{3}3]WIN 35,065-2	Selectivity [^{3}3]Citalopram / [^{3}3]Nisoxetine
Cocaine	—	156 ± 11	1.03 ± 0.01	1,930 ± 360	0.82 ± 0.05	306 ± 13	1.12 ± 0.15	404 ± 26	2.0	12	0.16
Methylphenidate	—	74.6 ± 7.4	0.96 ± 0.08	270 ± 23	0.76 ± 0.06	14 ± 8%^{f}	—	230 ± 16	>130	3.6	>47
3′,4′-dichloro-MPH	—	4.76 ± 0.62	2.07 ± 0.05	ND^{h}	—	667 ± 83	1.07 ± 0.04	7.00 ± 140	140	—	—
	—	6,610 ± 440	0.91 ± 0.01	11%^{b}	—	3,550 ± 70	1.79 ± 0.55	8,490 ± 1,800	0.54	>0.76	<0.7
	H	76.2 ± 3.4	1.05 ± 0.05	138 ± 9.0	1.12 ± 0.20	5,140 ± 670	1.29 ± 0.40	244 ± 2.5	67	1.8	37
	3′,4′-diCl	3.39 ± 0.77	1.25 ± 0.29	28.4 ± 2.5	1.56 ± 0.80	121 ± 17	1.16 ± 0.31	11.0 ± 0.00	36	8.4	4.3
	2′-Cl	480 ± 46	1.00 ± 0.09	2,750; 58%^{b}	0.96	1,840 ± 70	1.18 ± 0.06	1,260 ± 290	3.8	5.7	0.67
	—	34.6 ± 7.6	0.95 ± 0.18	160 ± 18	1.28 ± 0.12	102 ± 8.2	1.01 ± 0.02	87.6 ± 0.35	3.0	4.6	0.64
	CH_{2}OH	2,100 ± 697	0.87 ± 0.09	ND^{h}	—	16.2 ± 0.05%^{f}	—	10,400 ± 530	>4.8	—	—
	CH_{3}	7,610 ± 800	1.02 ± 0.03	8.3%^{b}	—	11 ± 5%^{f}	—	7,960 ± 290	>1.3	≫0.66	—
	^{d} R=OCH_{3}, X=H	570 ± 49	0.94 ± 0.10	2,040; 64 ± 1.7%^{f}	0.73	14 ± 3%^{f}	—	1,850 ± 160	>18	3.6	>4.9
	R=OH, X=H	6,250 ± 280	0.86 ± 0.03	23.7 ± 4.1%^{b}	—	1 ± 1%^{f}	—	10,700 ± 750	≫1.6	>0.80	—
	R=OH, X=3′,4′-diCl	35.7 ± 3.2	1.00 ± 0.09	367 ± 42	1.74 ± 0.87	2,050 ± 110	1.15 ± 0.12	ND^{h}	57	10	5.6
	H	908 ± 160	0.88 ± 0.05	4030; 52%^{b}	1.04	5 ± 1%^{f}	—	12,400 ± 1,500	≫11	4.4	≫2.5
	3′,4′-diCl	14.0 ± 1.2	1.27 ± 0.20	280 ± 76	0.68 ± 0.09	54 ± 2%^{f}	—	ND^{h}	~710	20	~36
	R=OH, X=H	108 ± 7.0	0.89 ± 0.10	351 ± 85	0.94 ± 0.27	12 ± 2%^{f}	—	680 ± 52	>93	3.3	>28
	R=OH, X=3′,4′-diCl	2.46 ± 0.52	1.39 ± 0.20	27.9 ± 3.5	0.70 ± 0.01	168	1.02	ND^{h}	68	11	6.0
	R=OCH_{3}, X=H	10.8 ± 0.8	0.97 ± 0.07	63.7 ± 2.8	0.84 ± 0.04	2,070; 73 ± 5%^{f}	0.90	61.0 ± 9.3	190	5.9	32
	R_{1}=CH_{3}, R_{2}=H	178 ± 28	1.23 ± 0.09	694 ± 65	0.88 ± 0.13	427	1.39	368	2.4	3.9	0.62
	R_{1}=H, R_{2}=CH_{3}	119 ± 20	1.17 ± 0.12	76.0 ± 12	0.88 ± 0.06	243	1.17	248	2.0	0.64	3.2
	—	175 ± 8.0	1.00 ± 0.04	1,520 ± 120	0.97 ± 0.06	19 ± 4%^{f}	—	ND^{h}	>57	8.69	>6.6
	R=CH_{2}CH_{3}, X=H	27.6 ± 1.7	1.29 ± 0.05	441 ± 49	1.16 ± 0.19	2,390; 80%^{f}	1.12	ND^{h}	87	15	5.8
	R=CH_{2}CH_{3}, X=3′,4′-diCl	3.44 ± 0.02	1.90 ± 0.05	102 ± 19	1.27 ± 0.10	286 ± 47	1.30 ± 0.10	ND^{h}	83	30	2.8
	R=CH_{2}CH_{3}, X=H	5.51 ± 0.93	1.15 ± 0.03	60.8 ± 9.6	0.75 ± 0.07	3,550; 86%^{f}	0.95	ND^{h}	640	11	58
	R=CH_{2}CH_{3}, X=3′,4′-diCl	4.12 ± 0.95	1.57 ± 0.00	98.8 ± 8.7	1.07 ± 0.07	199 ± 17	1.24 ± 0.00	ND^{h}	48	24	2.0
	—	6,360 ± 1,300	1.00 ± 0.04	36 ± 10%^{c}	—	22 ± 7%^{f}	—	8,800 ± 870	>1.6	—	—
	^{i} —	4,560 ± 1,100	1.10 ± 0.09	534 ± 210^{c}	0.96 ± 0.08	53 ± 6%^{f}	—	1,060 ± 115	~2.2	0.12	~19
	R_{1}=CH_{2}OH, R_{2}=H, X=H	406 ± 4	1.07 ± 0.08	ND^{h}	—	31.0 ± 1.5%^{f}	—	1,520 ± 15	>25	—	—
	R_{1}=CH_{2}OCH_{3}, R_{2}=H, X=H	89.9 ± 9.4	0.97 ± 0.04	ND^{h}	—	47.8 ± 0.7%^{f}	—	281 ± 19	~110	—	—
	R_{1}=CH_{2}OH, R_{2}=H, X=3′,4′-diCl	3.91 ± 0.49	1.21 ± 0.06	ND^{h}	—	276; 94.6%^{f}	0.89	22.5 ± 1.4	71	—	—
	R_{1}=H, R_{2}=CO_{2}CH_{3}, X=3′,4′-diCl	363 ± 20	1.17 ± 0.41	ND^{h}	—	2,570 ± 580	1.00 ± 00.1	317 ± 46	7.1	—	—
	R_{1}=CO_{2}CH_{3}, R_{2}=H, X=2′-Cl	1,740 ± 200	0.98 ± 0.02	ND^{h}	—	22.2 ± 2.5%^{f}	—	2,660 ± 140	>5.7	—	—

- ^{ɑ} Compounds tested as hydroclhoride (HCl) salts, unless otherwise noted.
- ^{b} % inhibition caused by 5μM
- ^{c} % inhibition caused by 10μM, as assayed by SRI
- ^{d} Tested as free base
- ^{e} Assayed by SRI (appropriate correction factor applied.)
- ^{f} % inhibition of 10μM compound.
- ^{g} Values expressed as x ± SEM of 2—5 replicate tests. (If no SEM shown, value is for an n of 1.)
- ^{h} Not determined
- ^{i} cf. phenmetrazine & derivatives

== Various MPH congener affinity values inclusive of norepinephrine & serotonin ==
Values for dl-threo-methylphenidate derivatives are the mean (s.d.) of 3—6 determinations, or are the mean of duplicate determinations. Values of other compounds are the mean—s.d. for 3—4 determinations where indicated, or are results of single experiments which agree with the literature. All binding experiments were done in triplicate.

Binding and uptake IC_{50} (nM) values for MAT.
Compound	DA	DA Uptake	NE	5HT
Methylphenidate	84 ± 33	153 ± 92	514 ± 74	>50,000
o-Bromomethylphenidate	880 ± 316	—	20,000	—
m-Bromomethylphenidate	4 ± 1	18 ± 11	20 ± 6	3,800
p-Bromomethylphenidate	21 ± 3	45 ± 19	31 ± 7	2,600
p-Hydroxymethylphenidate	125	263 ± 74	270 ± 69	17,000
p-Methyloxymethylphenidate	42 ± 24	490 ± 270	410	11,000
p-Nitromethylphenidate	180	—	360	5,900
p-Iodomethylphenidate	26 ± 14	—	32	1,800^{ɑ}
m-Iodo-p-hydroxymethylphenidate	42 ± 21	195 ± 197	370 ± 64	5,900
N-Methylmethylphenidate	1,400	—	2,800	40,000
d-threo-Methylphenidate	33	—	244 ± 142	>50,000
l-threo-Methylphenidate	540	—	5,100	>50,000
dl-erythro-o-Bromomethylphenidate	10,000	—	50,000	—
Cocaine	120	313 ± 160	2,100	190
WIN 35,428	13	—	530	72
Nomifensine	29 ± 16	—	15 ± 2	1,300^{ɑ}
Mazindol	9 ± 5	—	3 ± 2	92
Desipramine	1,400	—	3.5	200
Fluoxetine	3,300	—	3,400	2.4

- ^{ɑ} Denotes that preparation of membrane and results extrapolated therefrom originated from frozen tissue, which is known to change results when interpreting against fresh tissue experiments.

p-hydroxymethylphenidate displays low brain penetrability, ascribed to its phenolic hydroxyl group undergoing ionization at physiological pH.

== See also ==
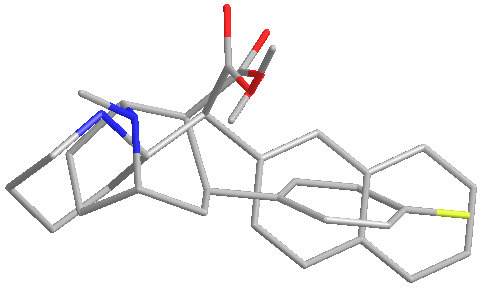
HDMP-28 molecular model superimposed over β-CFT. cf. cocaine, and the phenyltropane class of drugs, including all subsets of related derivatives for either as pertaining in similarity to methylphenidate analogs.

- List of modafinil analogues
- List of cocaine analogues
- Substituted cathinone

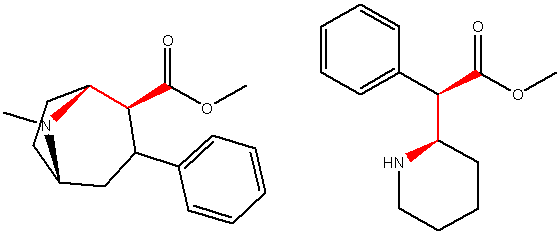

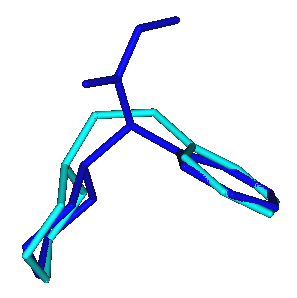
Methylphenidate rendered in 3D (in blue) overlaid with 1-(2-Phenylethyl) piperazine skeleton (turquoise) showing the basic 3- point pharmacophore shared between them and other dopamine reuptake inhibitors such as 3C-PEP (which in turn is structurally related to the GBR stimulant compounds.)
