= O-2172 =

Chemical compound

Identifiers
- IUPAC name: methyl 2-cyclopentyl-2-(3,4-dichlorophenyl)acetate
- CAS Number: 521062-92-0
- PubChem CID: 11778793
- ChemSpider: 9953475
- UNII: SPK6RB6JMK
- CompTox Dashboard (EPA): DTXSID901027195

Chemical and physical data
- Formula: C_{14}H_{16}Cl_{2}O_{2}
- Molar mass: 287.18 g·mol^{−1}
- 3D model (JSmol): Interactive image
- SMILES: Clc1ccc(cc1Cl)C(C(=O)OC)C2CCCC2
- InChI: InChI=1S/C14H16Cl2O2/c1-18-14(17)13(9-4-2-3-5-9)10-6-7-11(15)12(16)8-10/h6-9,13H,2-5H2,1H3; Key:NEHPFNBRZYFWFN-UHFFFAOYSA-N

O-2172 is a drug developed by Organix Inc, which acts as a stimulant and potent dopamine reuptake inhibitor. It is an analogue of methylphenidate where the phenyl ring has had a 3,4-dichloro substitution added, and the piperidine ring has been replaced by cyclopentane. It is around 1/3 the potency of methylphenidate, demonstrating that even with the important binding group of the nitrogen lone pair removed entirely, selective DAT binding and reuptake inhibition is still possible.

It has been sold as a designer drug under the name DCCPM.

== See also ==
- Tropoxane
- O-4210
- 3,4-Dichloromethylphenidate
