= 4-Methylmethylphenidate =

Stimulant drug

Legal status
- Legal status: CA: Schedule III; DE: NpSG (Industrial and scientific use only); UK: Class B

Identifiers
- IUPAC name: methyl (2R)-2-(4-methylphenyl)-2-[(2R)-piperidin-2-yl]acetate
- CAS Number: 191790-79-1 680996-70-7 (hydrochloride)
- PubChem CID: 44296147
- ChemSpider: 8281556
- UNII: 1Y11XUO4EY

Chemical and physical data
- Formula: C_{15}H_{21}NO_{2}
- Molar mass: 247.338 g·mol^{−1}
- 3D model (JSmol): Interactive image
- SMILES: Cc2ccc(cc2)C(C(=O)OC)C1CCCCN1
- InChI: InChI=1S/C15H21NO2/c1-11-6-8-12(9-7-11)14(15(17)18-2)13-5-3-4-10-16-13/h6-9,13-14,16H,3-5,10H2,1-2H3/t13-,14-/m0/s1; Key:WJZNCJIOIACDBR-KBPBESRZSA-N

threo-4-Methylmethylphenidate (4-MeTMP) is a stimulant drug related to methylphenidate. It is slightly less potent than methylphenidate and has relatively low efficacy at blocking dopamine reuptake despite its high binding affinity, which led to its investigation as a possible substitute drug for treatment of stimulant abuse. On the other hand, several other simple ring-substituted derivatives of threo-methylphenidate such as the 4-fluoro and 3-chloro compounds are more potent than methylphenidate both in efficacy as dopamine reuptake inhibitors and in animal drug discrimination assays.

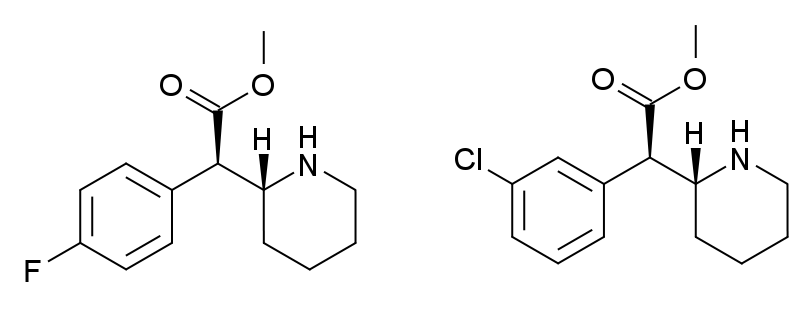
4-Fluoromethylphenidate (4F-MPH) and 3-chloromethylphenidate (3-CTMP)

== Legality ==
4-Methylmethylphenidate was banned in the UK as a Temporary Class Drug from June 2015 following its unapproved sale as a designer drug.

In the United States, 4-methylmethylphenidate may be considered illegal if intended for human consumption under the federal analogue act as a structural analog of methylphenidate.

In the United States, on September 22, 2023, the DEA filed a proposed rule for placement of ethylphenidate into Schedule I status, which would include its isomers. 4-Methylmethylphenidate is a positional isomer of ethylphenidate and thus the scheduling of ethylphenidate into Schedule I status would cause 4-methylmethylphenidate to be a Schedule I substance as well.

== See also ==
- 3-Bromomethylphenidate
- 3,4-Dichloromethylphenidate
- 4-Fluoromethylphenidate
- 4-Methylphenmetrazine
- Dexmethylphenidate
- HDMP-28
- Isopropylphenidate
- Propylphenidate
