= Temporary class drug =

Controlled drug status

A temporary class drug is a relatively new status for controlled drugs, which has been adopted in some jurisdictions, notably New Zealand and the United Kingdom, to attempt to bring newly synthesised designer drugs under legal control. The controlled drug legislation in these jurisdictions requires drug scheduling decisions to follow an evidence-based process, where the harms of the drug are assessed and reviewed so that an appropriate legal status can be assigned. Since many designer drugs sold in recent years have had little or no published research that could help inform such a decision, they have been widely sold as "legal highs", often for months, before sufficient evidence accumulates to justify placing them on the controlled drug schedules.

This situation has been deemed to be undesirable, as every time a designer drug has been banned, novel compounds with similar effects have been quickly developed and brought to market, often with worse health consequences reported than the original compound. The temporary class drug status has been developed to circumvent the evidential requirements and allow drugs to be banned temporarily as soon as they are deemed by authorities to be causing harm to individuals or society. The temporary ban lasts for a period of 1 year, after which the drug would in theory be made legal again, if sufficient evidence to ban it permanently had not been forthcoming. During the period of the temporary ban, the temporary class drugs are treated equivalently to established illegal drugs, though with reduced or absent penalties for personal use amounts, and the main focus of enforcement being on importation and sale of the drugs.

== United Kingdom ==
The Secretary of State has the authority to make temporary class drug orders under the Misuse of Drugs Act section 2A(1).

Initially, only the dissociative arylcyclohexylamine derivative methoxetamine was banned as a temporary class drug in the UK, effective from 5 April 2012. On 26 February 2013 methoxetamine was banned as a Class B drug under the Misuse of Drugs Act along with a large number of other arylcyclohexylamine derivatives under a 'catch-all' chemical structure clause. "In an attempt to prevent legal high manufacturers looking for a new ketamine analogue to sell, the government has placed countless other ketamine analogues into Class B and Schedule 1."

On 10 June 2013, a total of 10 benzofuran and indole analogues and four NBOMe hallucinogens were classified as Temporary Class Drugs in the UK following an ACMD recommendation. Specifically these include 5-APB, 6-APB, 5-APDB, 6-APDB and their N-methyl derivatives 5-MAPB, 6-MAPB, 5-MAPDB and 6-MAPDB, as well as 5-IT and its isomer 6-IT, plus NBOMe-2C-C, NBOMe-2C-B, NBOMe-2C-I and NBOMe-2C-D. This means that sale and import of the named substances are criminal offences and are treated as for Class B drugs.

On 31 March 2015, five derivatives of methylphenidate were recommended to be banned in the UK as Temporary Class Drugs following their sale as uncontrolled stimulant drugs. The compounds listed for control were ethylphenidate, propylphenidate, isopropylphenidate, methylnaphthidate and 3,4-Dichloromethylphenidate.

On 25 June 2015, two more derivatives of methylphenidate, 4-Methylmethylphenidate and ethylnaphthidate, were recommended to be banned in the UK as Temporary Class Drugs following their sale as uncontrolled stimulant drugs.

Following the ban on ethylphenidate authorities noticed that methiopropamine had replaced it as the stimulant of choice for injecting users. A TCDO was announced a week later and it was banned 48 hours after this.

== New Zealand ==
In New Zealand, 35 drugs have been banned as temporary class drugs since August 2011, 24 of which have subsequently had the temporary ban renewed for a further year after reaching the end of the initial one-year ban period. These include; JWH-018, JWH-022, JWH-073, JWH-081, JWH-122, JWH-201, JWH-203, JWH-210, JWH-250, JWH-302, AM-694, AM-2201, RCS-4, RCS-4 butyl homologue, 2-methoxy isomer of RCS-4, and 2-methoxy isomer of RCS-4 butyl homologue, which were banned on 16 August 2011, JWH-019, JWH-200 and AM-1220, which were banned on 14 October 2011, AM-2233, banned on 29 December 2011, AM-1248, AM-2232 and UR-144, banned on 6 April 2012, and the stimulant methylhexanamine, banned on 9 April 2012. Another four cannabinoid compounds, namely CB-13, MAM-2201, AKB48 and XLR-11, were banned on 13 July 2012. A further cannabinoid compound NNE1 was banned from 8 November 2012. Two more cannabinoids APICA (also known as 2NE1) and its 5-fluoropentyl derivative STS-135 were banned from 22 November 2012. Another cannabinoid EAM-2201 was banned from 6 December 2012. Another stimulant, the phenyltropane derivative RTI-126, was banned from 27 December 2012. Two more cannabinoids QUCHIC (also known as BB-22) and 5F-AKB48 were banned from 9 May 2013.

On 18 July 2013, the Psychoactive Substances Act 2013 came into effect in New Zealand. This superseded the Temporary Class Drug scheme, as all novel psychoactive substances are restricted by default, except where specifically licensed. This Act promises to introduce strict toxicity testing and quality control standards for recreational psychoactive substances, with products that are proved to meet the safety criteria being allowed to be sold legally. Products that were on sale immediately prior to the introduction of the Act were allowed to continue to be on sale while the safety testing regime is implemented, but can be removed from sale if significant adverse events are reported. A number of interim licenses have been refused or revoked under this process, and by January 2014 a total of twelve more synthetic cannabis products had been removed from sale, containing ingredients such as ADB-CHMICA (SGT-7), 5F-PB-22, SGT-55 (CUMYL-BICA), SGT-56 (CUMYL-PICA), 4-F-AM-2201, 4-Cl-AM-2201 and PB-22.

On 27 April 2014 it was announced that all 41 remaining untested "legal high" products, which had been allowed to continue to be on sale during an interim period, were to be banned on 9 May 2014. These were mainly synthetic cannabis products containing ingredients such as AB-FUBINACA, PB-22 (QUPIC), 5F-PB-22, SGT-24 (CUMYL-PINACA), CP 55,244, 4-F-AM-2201, 4-Cl-AM-2201, 5F-ADBICA and AB-005. There was also one cannabinoid pill containing SGT-42 (CUMYL-THPINACA), and several "party pill" products containing mixtures of ingredients such as caffeine, hordenine, synephrine and kava. No "legal high" products will be allowed back on sale in New Zealand under the Psychoactive Substances Act until they have been tested in a manner yet to be determined, and found to present a "low risk of harm". This process is expected to take at least 18 months or more. Six of the synthetic cannabis products were ordered to be immediately removed from sale by emergency recall on 1 May 2014, to ensure that users would not be able to stockpile supplies of these products before the general ban took effect on 9 May.

== See also ==
- Designer drug
