= Propylphenidate =

Stimulant drug

Legal status
- Legal status: CA: Schedule III; DE: NpSG (Industrial and scientific use only); UK: Class B

Identifiers
- IUPAC name: Propyl 2-phenyl-2-(piperidin-2-yl)acetate
- CAS Number: 1071564-47-0
- PubChem CID: 91844465
- ChemSpider: 52085111
- UNII: 0Q064445GT
- CompTox Dashboard (EPA): DTXSID101032411

Chemical and physical data
- Formula: C_{16}H_{23}NO_{2}
- Molar mass: 261.365 g·mol^{−1}
- 3D model (JSmol): Interactive image
- SMILES: C1(=CC=CC=C1)C(C(=O)OCCC)C2CCCCN2
- InChI: InChI=1S/C16H23NO2/c1-2-12-19-16(18)15(13-8-4-3-5-9-13)14-10-6-7-11-17-14/h3-5,8-9,14-15,17H,2,6-7,10-12H2,1H3; Key:PRMWWEANNQSWAR-UHFFFAOYSA-N

Propylphenidate (also known as PPH) is a piperidine based stimulant drug, closely related to methylphenidate, but with the methyl ester replaced by a propyl ester. It was banned in the UK as a Temporary Class Drug from April 2015 following its unapproved sale as a designer drug.

== Pharmacology ==
=== Pharmacodynamics ===
Propylphenidate binds to the norepinephrine transporter in human embryonic kidney cells with an affinity similar to that of isopropylphenidate and ethylphenidate. However, its binding affinity for the dopamine transporter is 4 times lower, making it one of the methylphenidate analogues with the weakest affinity for DAT. On drug user forums, its subjective effects are described as very mild.

== Legal status ==
Propylphenidate is illegal in Sweden as of 26 January 2016, and in Finland since 2017.

== See also ==
- 3,4-Dichloromethylphenidate
- 4-Fluoromethylphenidate
- 4-Methylmethylphenidate
- Dexmethylphenidate
- Ethylphenidate
- Isopropylphenidate
- HDEP-28
- HDMP-28
