= Ritalinic acid =

Major metabolite of the psychostimulant drug methylphenidate

Clinical data
- ATC code: None

Legal status
- Legal status: US: Unscheduled and Uncontrolled

Identifiers
- IUPAC name: Phenyl(piperidin-2-yl)acetic acid
- CAS Number: 19395-41-6
- PubChem CID: 86863
- ChemSpider: 78360
- UNII: GT4165RS9H
- CompTox Dashboard (EPA): DTXSID20864888
- ECHA InfoCard: 100.039.094

Chemical and physical data
- Formula: C_{13}H_{17}NO_{2}
- Molar mass: 219.284 g·mol^{−1}
- 3D model (JSmol): Interactive image
- SMILES: C1CCNC(C1)C(C2=CC=CC=C2)C(=O)O
- InChI: InChI=InChI=1S/C13H17NO2/c15-13(16)12(10-6-2-1-3-7-10)11-8-4-5-9-14-11/h1-3,6-7,11-12,14H,4-5,8-9H2,(H,15,16); Key:INGSNVSERUZOAK-UHFFFAOYSA-N

Ritalinic acid is a substituted phenethylamine and an inactive major metabolite of the psychostimulant drugs methylphenidate, dexmethylphenidate and ethylphenidate. When administered orally, methylphenidate is extensively metabolized in the liver by hydrolysis of the ester group yielding ritalinic acid. The hydrolysis was found to be catalyzed by carboxylesterase 1 (CES1).

Etymologically, ritalinic acid shares its roots with Ritalin, a common brand name for methylphenidate.

== Uses ==
Ritalinic acid is used as an intermediate in the synthesis of methylphenidate and its analogues, such as ethylphenidate and isopropylphenidate.
