= 3-FPO =

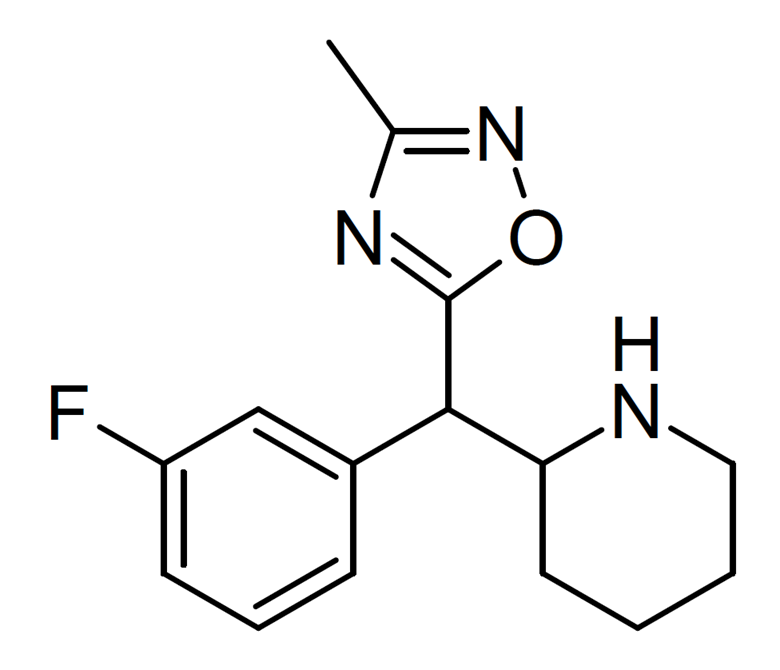

Chemical and physical data
- Formula: C_{15}H_{18}FN_{3}O
- Molar mass: 275.327 g·mol^{−1}
- 3D model (JSmol): Interactive image
- SMILES: Fc1cc(ccc1)C(c1onc(C)n1)C1CCCCN1
- InChI: InChI=InChI=1S/C15H18FN3O/c1-10-18-15(20-19-10)14(13-7-2-3-8-17-13)11-5-4-6-12(16)9-11/h4-6,9,13-14,17H,2-3,7-8H2,1H3; Key:VTIGLORPMJPEFB-UHFFFAOYSA-N

3-FPO is a compound from the phenidate family, which has been sold as a designer drug. It reportedly has stimulant effects, though little pharmacological data is available aside from anecdotal reports and its structural similarity to known stimulant compounds from the phenidate group, such as 4-fluoromethylphenidate and desoxypipradrol, and phenyltropane derivatives such as RTI-126. It has been added to the controlled drugs list in Hungary.

== See also ==
- 3-Fluoroamphetamine
- 3-Fluoromethcathinone
- 3-Fluorophenmetrazine
