= RTI-171 =

Chemical compound

Identifiers
- IUPAC name: 3-Methyl-5-[(1S,3S,4S,5R)-8-methyl-3-(4-methylphenyl)-8-azabicyclo[3.2.1]octan-4-yl]-1,2-oxazole
- CAS Number: 178929-75-4
- PubChem CID: 10565888
- ChemSpider: 8741276
- UNII: Q8U66P787F
- CompTox Dashboard (EPA): DTXSID701029676

Chemical and physical data
- Formula: C_{19}H_{24}N_{2}O
- Molar mass: 296.414 g·mol^{−1}
- 3D model (JSmol): Interactive image
- SMILES: n1oc(cc1C)[C@@H]3[C@@H]4N(C)[C@H](C[C@@H]3c2ccc(cc2)C)CC4
- InChI: InChI=1S/C19H24N2O/c1-12-4-6-14(7-5-12)16-11-15-8-9-17(21(15)3)19(16)18-10-13(2)20-22-18/h4-7,10,15-17,19H,8-9,11H2,1-3H3/t15-,16+,17+,19-/m0/s1; Key:JWOFBAPJYPWTNI-FAJBIJEISA-N

(–)-2β-(3-Methylisoxazol-5-yl)-3β-(p-tolyl)tropane (RTI-4229-171) is a phenyltropane derivative which acts as a selective dopamine reuptake inhibitor, with a relatively slow onset of action and short duration of effects found in animal studies. However, other studies have shown it to have the most pronounced effects in terms of speed of onset and rate of stimulation among many differing phenyltropanes.

== See also ==
- List of phenyltropanes
- RTI-126
- O-4210
