= HDEP-28 =

Stimulant drug

Clinical data
- Other names: HDEP28; Ethylnaphthidate
- Drug class: Stimulant

Legal status
- Legal status: CA: Schedule III; DE: NpSG (Industrial and scientific use only); UK: Class B

Identifiers
- IUPAC name: Ethyl (naphthalen-2-yl)(piperidin-2-yl)acetate
- CAS Number: 2170529-69-6
- PubChem CID: 91844468
- ChemSpider: 52085106
- UNII: A8326SH248
- CompTox Dashboard (EPA): DTXSID601336139

Chemical and physical data
- Formula: C_{19}H_{23}NO_{2}
- Molar mass: 297.398 g·mol^{−1}
- 3D model (JSmol): Interactive image
- SMILES: CCOC(=O)C(C1CCCCN1)c2ccc3ccccc3c2
- InChI: InChI=1S/C19H23NO2/c1-2-22-19(21)18(17-9-5-6-12-20-17)16-11-10-14-7-3-4-8-15(14)13-16/h3-4,7-8,10-11,13,17-18,20H,2,5-6,9,12H2,1H3; Key:OTQVTBPHZRARTL-UHFFFAOYSA-N

HDEP-28 or ethylnaphthidate is a stimulant drug of the piperidine and naphthylaminopropane groups, closely related to ethylphenidate, but with the benzene ring replaced by naphthalene. It is even more closely related to HDMP-28 (methylnaphthidate), which acts as a potent serotonin–norepinephrine–dopamine reuptake inhibitor with several times the potency of methylphenidate and a short duration of action. It has been sold as a designer drug since around 2015.

== Legality ==
HDEP-28 was banned in the UK as a Temporary Class Drug from June 2015 following its unapproved sale as a designer drug, alongside 4-Methylmethylphenidate.

== See also ==
- Substituted naphthylethylamine
- List of methylphenidate analogues
- 2β-Propanoyl-3β-(2-naphthyl)-tropane (WF-23)
- 3,4-Dichloromethylphenidate
- 4-Methylmethylphenidate
- 4-Fluoromethylphenidate
- Isopropylphenidate
- Naphthylisopropylamine
- Naphyrone
- Propylphenidate
