= 4-Fluoromethylphenidate =

Chemical compound

Legal status
- Legal status: CA: Schedule III; DE: NpSG; UK: Under Psychoactive Substances Act

Identifiers
- IUPAC name: Methyl 2-(4-fluorophenyl)-2-(piperidin-2-yl)acetate
- CAS Number: 1354631-33-6
- PubChem CID: 70876096
- ChemSpider: 26350585
- UNII: TN2LV2C0X9

Chemical and physical data
- Formula: C_{14}H_{18}FNO_{2}
- Molar mass: 251.301 g·mol^{−1}
- 3D model (JSmol): Interactive image
- Melting point: 222.0 °C (431.6 °F)
- SMILES: FC1=CC=C(C=C1)C(C(=O)OC)C2CCCCN2
- InChI: InChI=1S/C14H18FNO2/c1-18-14(17)13(12-4-2-3-9-16-12)10-5-7-11(15)8-6-10/h5-8,12-13,16H,2-4,9H2,1H3; Key:XISBAJBPDVRSPG-UHFFFAOYSA-N

4-Fluoromethylphenidate (also known as 4-FMPH and 4F-MPH) is a stimulant drug that acts as a higher potency dopamine reuptake inhibitor than the closely related methylphenidate.

4-Fluoromethylphenidate was studied further along with other analogues of (±)-threo-methylphenidate (TMP) to assess their potential as anti-cocaine medications. 4F-MPH was reported as having an ED_{50} mg/kg of 0.26 (0.18–0.36), regarding its efficacy as a substitute for cocaine, and a relative potency of 3.33 compared to methylphenidate for the same purpose. This is based on its binding strength to the dopamine transporter vs. its activity as a dopamine reuptake inhibitor. In theory, this would block some of the effects of cocaine, without being as addictive. This has been misinterpreted as a dopamine vs. norepinephrine selectivity ratio.

Another study found that in the threo-isomers of methylphenidate, the meta- and para-substituted compounds with electron-withdrawing substituents tended to have increased binding potency. Compounds containing fluorine, chlorine, bromine and methyl groups were reported to be more potent than methylphenidate as well as the closely related compound 4F-EPH. 4F-MPH was reported as having the following values: [^{3}H]WIN 35428 binding of 35.0 ± 3.0 (2) and [^{3}H]dopamine 142 ± 2.0 (2).

== Legal status ==
=== United States of America ===
4-Fluoromethylphenidate is a Schedule I controlled substance in the US state Alabama.

=== Canada ===
As of 5 May 2017, 4-fluoromethylphenidate is a controlled substance in Canada.

=== Germany ===
Due to the new psychoactive substances law, 4-fluoromethylphenidate is a controlled substance in Germany.

== See also ==
- 3-Bromomethylphenidate
- 3,4-Dichloromethylphenidate
- 4-Fluoroethylphenidate
- 4-Methylmethylphenidate
- Dexmethylphenidate
- HDEP-28
- HDMP-28
- Isopropylphenidate
