= 4-Fluoroethylphenidate =

Stimulant designer drug

Identifiers
- IUPAC name: Ethyl 2-(4-fluorophenyl)-2-(piperidin-2-yl)acetate
- CAS Number: 2160555-59-7
- PubChem CID: 123133727
- UNII: V25ZZW8GBV
- CompTox Dashboard (EPA): DTXSID301336966

Chemical and physical data
- Formula: C_{15}H_{20}FNO_{2}
- Molar mass: 265.328 g·mol^{−1}
- 3D model (JSmol): Interactive image
- SMILES: Fc1ccc(cc1)C(C(=O)OCC)C1CCCCN1
- InChI: InChI=1S/C15H20FNO2/c1-2-19-15(18)14(13-5-3-4-10-17-13)11-6-8-12(16)9-7-11/h6-9,13-14,17H,2-5,10H2,1H3; Key:RKXQYWFDJDYSEN-UHFFFAOYSA-N

4-Fluoroethylphenidate (4F-EPH) is a recreational designer drug from the phenidate family, with stimulant effects. It was first identified in France in March 2016. It has been used as a nootropic drug, and was made illegal in the UK in 2017, and in Sweden in 2018.

== See also ==
- 4-Fluoromethylphenidate
- Ethylphenidate
