= 3-Bromomethylphenidate =

Chemical compound

Identifiers
- IUPAC name: Methyl 2-(3-bromophenyl)-2-(piperidin-2-yl)acetate
- CAS Number: 2865958-69-4
- PubChem CID: 52947287
- ChemSpider: 26350024
- ChEMBL: ChEMBL1253736

Chemical and physical data
- Formula: C_{14}H_{18}BrNO_{2}
- Molar mass: 312.207 g·mol^{−1}
- 3D model (JSmol): Interactive image
- SMILES: COC(=O)C(C1CCCCN1)C2=CC(=CC=C2)Br
- InChI: InChI=1S/C14H18BrNO2/c1-18-14(17)13(12-7-2-3-8-16-12)10-5-4-6-11(15)9-10/h4-6,9,12-13,16H,2-3,7-8H2,1H3/t12-,13-/m1/s1; Key:JMCTXWAIACSNAZ-CHWSQXEVSA-N

3-Bromomethylphenidate (3-Br-MPH) is a compound from the phenidate family, which has reportedly been sold as a designer drug. It showed the most potent binding to the dopamine transporter of a series of ring-substituted methylphenidate derivatives, and produced stimulant effects in animal studies.

== See also ==
- 3,4-Dichloromethylphenidate
- 4-Fluoromethylphenidate
- 4-Methylmethylphenidate
- Methylnaphthidate
- 4B-MAR
