= EAM-2201 =

Chemical compound

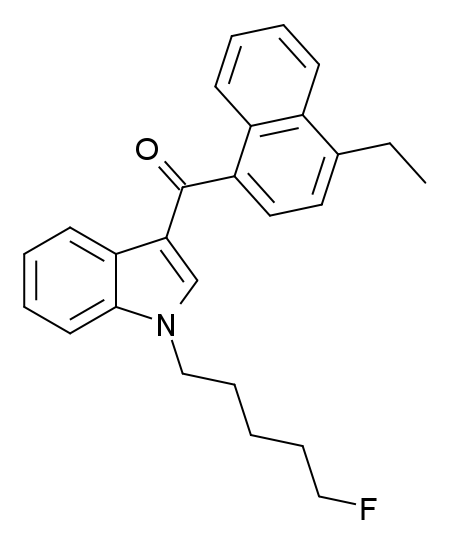

Legal status
- Legal status: BR: Class F2 (Prohibited psychotropics); CA: Schedule II; DE: Anlage II (Authorized trade only, not prescriptible); NZ: Temporary Class; UK: Under Psychoactive Substances Act; US: Schedule I

Identifiers
- IUPAC name: (4-Ethyl-1-naphthalenyl)[1-(5-fluoropentyl)-1H-indol-3-yl]-methanone
- CAS Number: 1364933-60-7
- PubChem CID: 71308187
- ChemSpider: 29341514
- UNII: OO52S1U9ET
- CompTox Dashboard (EPA): DTXSID50745434

Chemical and physical data
- Formula: C_{26}H_{26}FNO
- Molar mass: 387.498 g·mol^{−1}
- 3D model (JSmol): Interactive image
- SMILES: CCC1=CC=C(C(C2=CN(CCCCCF)C3=C2C=CC=C3)=O)C4=C1C=CC=C4
- InChI: InChI=1S/C26H26FNO/c1-2-19-14-15-23(21-11-5-4-10-20(19)21)26(29)24-18-28(17-9-3-8-16-27)25-13-7-6-12-22(24)25/h4-7,10-15,18H,2-3,8-9,16-17H2,1H3; Key:NSCXPXDWLZORPX-UHFFFAOYSA-N

EAM-2201 (4'-ethyl-AM-2201, 5"-fluoro-JWH-210, SGT-14) is a drug that presumably acts as a potent agonist for the cannabinoid receptors. It had never previously been reported in the scientific or patent literature, and was first identified by laboratories in Japan in July 2012 as an ingredient in synthetic cannabis smoking blends Like the closely related MAM-2201 which had been first reported around a year earlier, EAM-2201 thus appears to be another novel compound invented by designer drug suppliers specifically for recreational use. Structurally, EAM-2201 is a hybrid of two known cannabinoid compounds JWH-210 and AM-2201, both of which had previously been used as active ingredients in synthetic cannabis blends before being banned in many countries.

== Pharmacology ==
EAM-2201 acts as a full agonist with a binding affinity of 0.380 nM at CB_{1} and 0.371 nM at CB_{2} cannabinoid receptors.

== Legal status ==
In the United States, all CB_{1} receptor agonists of the 3-(1-naphthoyl)indole class such as EAM-2201 are Schedule I Controlled Substances.

EAM-2201 was banned in New Zealand as a temporary class drug from 6 December 2012, after reports of addiction and psychosis associated with use of products containing EAM-2201 as an active ingredient, however this has been protested by some users who claim to have found medical benefits in the treatment of conditions such as phantom limb pain, since medicinal marijuana was not available in New Zealand and synthetic cannabis products were used as a legal alternative.

EAM-2201 is an Anlage II controlled drug in Germany.

As of October 2015 EAM-2201 is a controlled substance in China.

== Detection ==
A forensic standard of EAM-2201 is available and commonly used in mass spectrometry.

== See also ==
- AM-694
- AM-1235
- AM-2232
- AM-2233
- JWH-018
- THJ-2201
- NM-2201
