= CTDP-32476 =

Dopamine reuptake inhibitor

Identifiers
- IUPAC name: (2R)-2-[(1R)-1-(4-chlorophenyl)-3-methylbutyl]piperidine
- CAS Number: 928046-68-8
- PubChem CID: 101541235
- ChemSpider: 68057578

Chemical and physical data
- Formula: C_{16}H_{24}ClN
- Molar mass: 265.83 g·mol^{−1}
- 3D model (JSmol): Interactive image
- SMILES: CC(C)C[C@H]([C@@H]1CCCCN1)C2=CC=C(C=C2)Cl
- InChI: InChI=1S/C16H24ClN/c1-12(2)11-15(16-5-3-4-10-18-16)13-6-8-14(17)9-7-13/h6-9,12,15-16,18H,3-5,10-11H2,1-2H3/t15-,16-/m0/s1; Key:UWHKVOABKKOHHU-HOTGVXAUSA-N

CTDP-32476 is an atypical, highly potent dopamine reuptake inhibitor investigated as a potential pharmacotherapy for cocaine addiction. Unlike cocaine, which acts as a serotonin–norepinephrine–dopamine reuptake inhibitor (SNDRI) by rapidly blocking reuptake of all three monoamines, CTDP-32476 is highly selective for the dopamine transporter (DAT) and does not significantly block either the serotonin or norepinephrine transporters. Its slow-onset and long-duration effects are thought to result from pharmacokinetic properties such as delayed absorption and slower diffusion across the blood-brain barrier (BBB), resulting in a much lower risk of abuse compared to cocaine. However, the evidence for slower BBB penetration is indirect and inferred primarily from behavioral and neurochemical profiles rather than direct permeability measurements. While agonist-replacement therapies have been effective for opiate and nicotine dependence, there is currently no reliably successful agent for cocaine addiction.

The two enantiomers were labeled ATDP-34209 and ATDP-34210. Their absolute configurations were determined by X-ray crystallography. ATDP-34210 is the RR enantiomer corresponding to the active RR enantiomer of methylphenidate. Both the SS and the RR enantiomers have similar activities.

== Synthesis ==

The starting quaternary phosphonium salt is called isobutyltriphenylphosphonium bromide (1a). Treatment with phenyl lithium gives the corresponding ylide p-(i-butylidene)triphenylphosphorane (1b). The Wittig reaction with 2-(4-chlorobenzoyl)pyridine (2) gives a pair of geometric isomers: 2-[(E)-1-(4-chlorophenyl)-3-methylbut-1-enyl]pyridine (3) & 2-[(Z)-1-(4-chlorophenyl)-3-methylbut-1-enyl]pyridine (4). Catalytic hydrogenation completes the synthesis (5).

The geometric isomers can be resolved using the corresponding acetylleucine enantiomers.

== See also ==
- Sibutramine
- Indatraline (30,640 is N-methyl-Indatraline)
- RTI-336
- PR-000608
- List of methylphenidate analogues
