= O-4210 =

Chemical compound

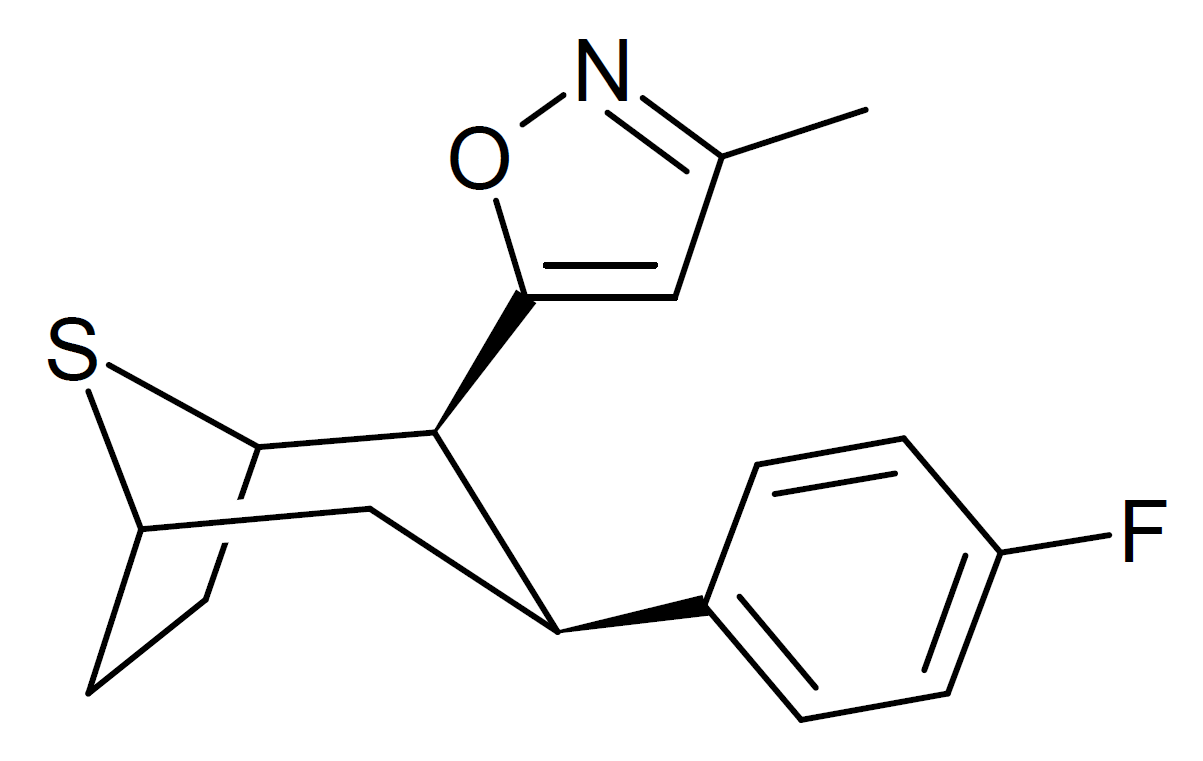

Identifiers
- IUPAC name: 5-[(2R,3S)-3-(4-fluorophenyl)-8-thiabicyclo[3.2.1]octan-2-yl]-3-methyl-1,2-oxazole
- CAS Number: 1266655-36-0
- PubChem CID: 50942207
- ChemSpider: 26378216
- ChEMBL: ChEMBL1643663

Chemical and physical data
- Formula: C_{17}H_{18}FNOS
- Molar mass: 303.40 g·mol^{−1}
- 3D model (JSmol): Interactive image
- SMILES: CC1=NOC(=C1)[C@H]2[C@H](CC3CCC2S3)C4=CC=C(C=C4)F
- InChI: InChI=1S/C17H18FNOS/c1-10-8-15(20-19-10)17-14(9-13-6-7-16(17)21-13)11-2-4-12(18)5-3-11/h2-5,8,13-14,16-17H,6-7,9H2,1H3/t13?,14-,16?,17-/m1/s1; Key:LXAGRMZFEDEAAM-VVBDHPJYSA-N

O-4210 is a drug developed by Organix Inc which acts as a selective dopamine reuptake inhibitor, with good selectivity over the serotonin transporter but its activity at the noradrenaline transporter is not known. It is a thiatropane derivative, related in chemical structure to phenyltropane derivatives such as RTI-126 and RTI-171, but with the amine nitrogen replaced by sulfur, demonstrating that this nitrogen only plays a minor contribution to receptor binding, in a similar manner to the related oxatropane tropoxane.

== See also ==
- List of phenyltropanes
