= Tropoxane =

Chemical compound

Clinical data
- ATC code: none

Identifiers
- IUPAC name: Methyl (1R,2S,3S,5S)-3-(3,4-dichlorophenyl)-8-oxabicyclo[3.2.1]octane-2-carboxylate
- CAS Number: 192461-10-2
- PubChem CID: 9796921
- ChemSpider: 7972687
- ChEMBL: ChEMBL5271116
- CompTox Dashboard (EPA): DTXSID801028338

Chemical and physical data
- Formula: C_{15}H_{16}Cl_{2}O_{3}
- Molar mass: 315.19 g·mol^{−1}
- 3D model (JSmol): Interactive image
- SMILES: Clc1ccc(cc1Cl)[C@H]2C[C@H]3O[C@@H]([C@H]2C(=O)OC)CC3
- InChI: InChI=1S/C15H16Cl2O3/c1-19-15(18)14-10(7-9-3-5-13(14)20-9)8-2-4-11(16)12(17)6-8/h2,4,6,9-10,13-14H,3,5,7H2,1H3/t9-,10+,13+,14-/m0/s1; Key:DHXANQGCRAVCSQ-PJQZNRQZSA-N

Tropoxane (O-1072) is an aryloxytropane derivative drug developed by Organix Inc., which acts as a stimulant and potent dopamine and serotonin reuptake inhibitor. It is an analogue of dichloropane where the amine nitrogen has been replaced by an oxygen ether link (at the bridgehead position), demonstrating that the amine nitrogen is not required for DAT binding and reuptake inhibition.

== Thia analog ==
The 8-thiabicyclo(3.2.1)octanes analogs such as O-4210 have been prepared. A representative set of analogs is listed below.

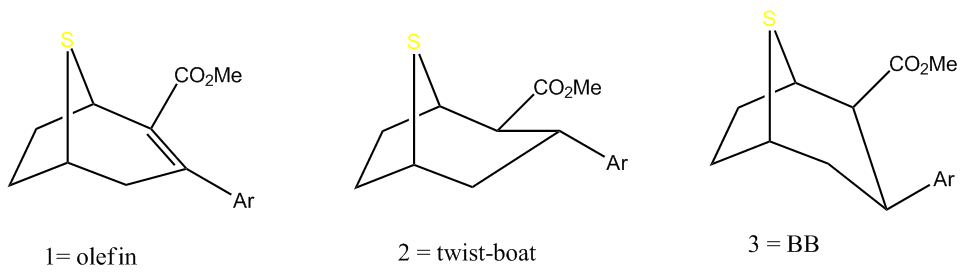

MAT IC50 (nM) 8-thiabicyclo[3.2.1]octanes
X	Com	DAT	SERT	Com	DAT	SERT	Com	DAT	SERT
H	1a	910	>10uM	2a	140	>8uM	3a	117	>3uM
F	1b	220	>30uM	2b	59	>11uM	3b	38	494
Cl	1c	13	>10uM	2c	11	1uM	3c	9.6	33
Br	1d	9.1	>25uM	2d	6.0	342	3d	6.0	14
I	1e	6.7	>8uM	2e	9.0	70	3e	14	10
Cl_{2}	1f	4.5	>3uM	2f	6.9	99	3f	5.7	8.0
BN	1g	8.0	>1uM	2g	8.0	36	3g	16	13

It had been hypothesized that transporter binding of the tropanes might include ionic bonding of the central tropane nitrogen. But it turned out that at this site neither ionic nor hydrogen bonding is a prerequisite for potent monoamine reuptake inhibition. Oxa- and thia-analogs of RTI-111 are potent inhibitors, and even an N-replacement by methylene holds the potency within the same magnitude. However, N-quaternisation (N-dimethyl) considerably reduces DAT affinity.

In this SAR, the focus is on seeing the effect of changing 8-NMe to S, O, or CH2. Both enantiomers, as well as the racemates are presented in several cases for comparison.

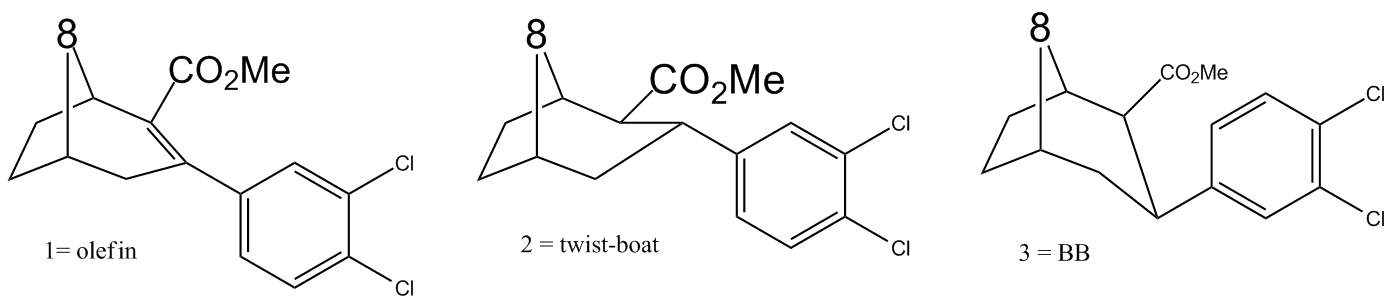

MAT IC50 (nM) Cl2 bicyclo[3.2.1]octanes
Enant.	X	Com	DAT	SERT	Com	DAT	SERT	Com	DAT	SERT
Rac	S	1a	4.5	3,600	2a	6.9	99	3a	5.7	8.0
Rac	O	1a	10	6,000	2a	3.1	64.5	3a	3.3	6.5
1R	NMe	1a	1.2	867	2a	0.4	27	3a	1.1	2.5
Rac	CH_{2}	1a	7.1	5,160	2a	13	166	3a	9.6	33

== See also ==
- List of cocaine analogues
- O-2172
