= Ethylphenidate =

Stimulant analog of methylphenidate

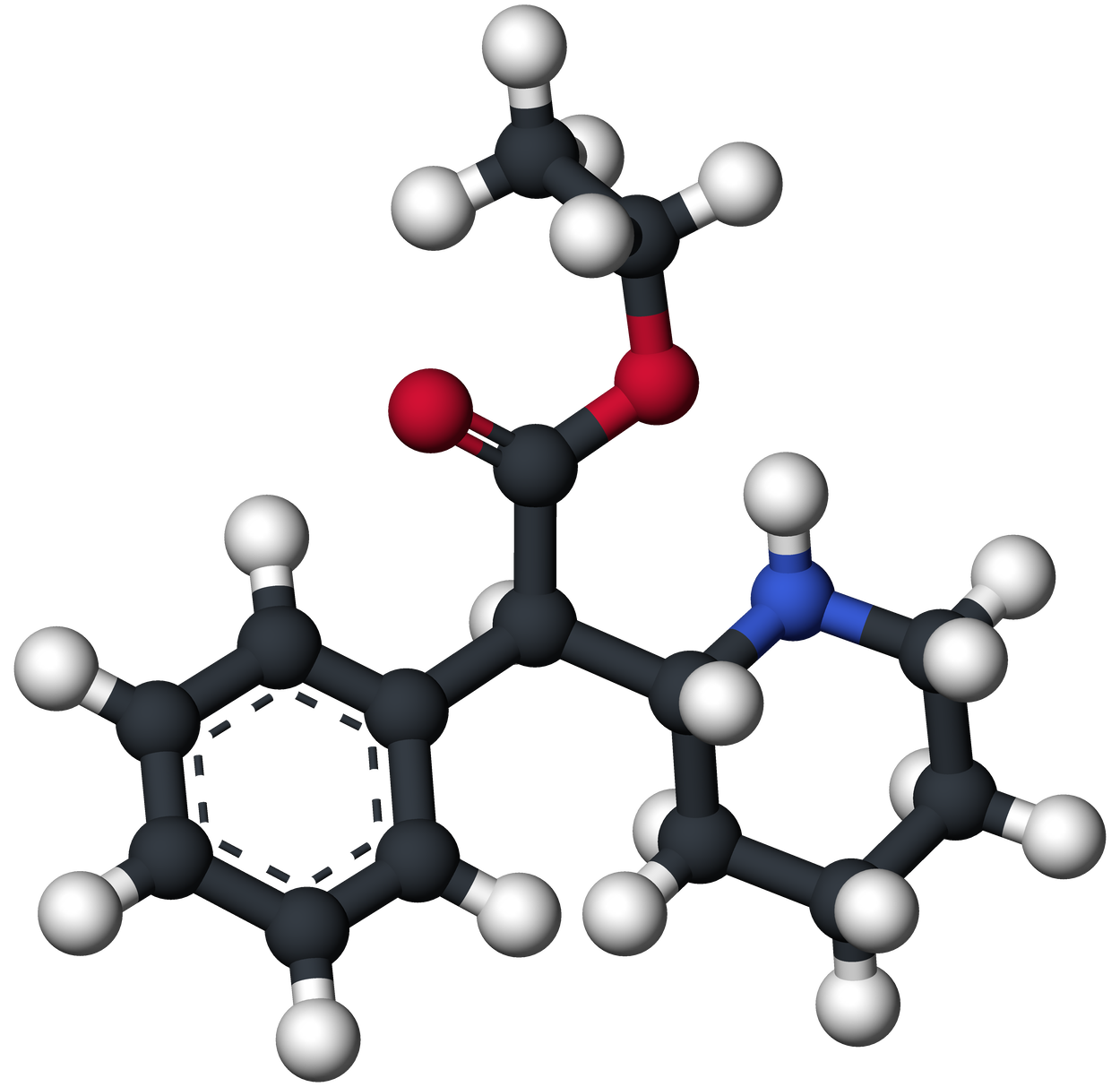

Clinical data
- Routes of administration: By mouth, insufflation, inhalation, sublingual, rectal, intramuscular, intravenous
- Drug class: Stimulant; Norepinephrine-dopamine reuptake inhibitor
- ATC code: none

Legal status
- Legal status: AU: S8 (Controlled Drug); BR: Class F2 (Prohibited psychotropics); CA: Schedule 3; DE: Anlage II (Authorized trade only, not prescriptible); UK: Class B Temporary Class Drug; US: Schedule I; UN: Psychotropic Schedule II

Pharmacokinetic data
- Bioavailability: Variable
- Protein binding: Unknown
- Metabolism: Hepatic transesterification of prodrugs methylphenidate and ethanol
- Excretion: Urine, sweat

Identifiers
- IUPAC name: (RS)-Ethyl 2-phenyl-2-piperidin-2-ylacetate
- CAS Number: 57413-43-1
- PubChem CID: 3080846
- ChemSpider: 2338571
- UNII: 984DG861KD
- KEGG: C22752
- CompTox Dashboard (EPA): DTXSID60912317

Chemical and physical data
- Formula: C_{15}H_{21}NO_{2}
- Molar mass: 247.338 g·mol^{−1}
- 3D model (JSmol): Interactive image
- SMILES: CCOC(=O)C(C1CCCCN1)C2=CC=CC=C2
- InChI: InChI=1S/C15H21NO2/c1-2-18-15(17)14(12-8-4-3-5-9-12)13-10-6-7-11-16-13/h3-5,8-9,13-14,16H,2,6-7,10-11H2,1H3; Key:AIVSIRYZIBXTMM-UHFFFAOYSA-N

Ethylphenidate (EPH) is a central nervous system (CNS) stimulant and the ethyl analog of methylphenidate.

Ethylphenidate acts as a norepinephrine–dopamine reuptake inhibitor, meaning it effectively boosts the levels of the norepinephrine and dopamine neurotransmitters in the brain, by binding to, and partially blocking the transporter proteins that normally remove those monoamines from the synaptic cleft.

Ethylphenidate, being almost identical to methylphenidate in both structure and pharmacodynamics, likely also doesn't solely act as a "classical" reuptake inhibitor but primarily as an inverse agonist at the dopamine transporter (DAT), inducing dopamine transporter reversal and subsequent dopamine release from the axon terminal into the synaptic cleft in a manner similar to but distinct from amphetamines.

Ethylphenidate has appeared as a novel psychoactive substance (NPS) and has been reported in some regions as a recreational stimulant. It has been marketed through unregulated channels, where purity, dosage, and composition may vary.

Its abuse potential is related to dopaminergic activity, particularly DAT interactions. Rapid delivery routes that produce higher concentrations in the brain may increase reinforcing effects and the likelihood of compulsive use.

Ethylphenidate has been reported to produce stimulant effects comparable to those of cocaine in some contexts due to its activity at dopamine transporters; however, direct comparisons of potency, subjective effects, and abuse liability between ethylphenidate and cocaine are limited.

== Pharmacology ==
=== Pharmacokinetics ===
Ethylphenidate metabolizes into methylphenidate and ritalinic acid.

Tiny amounts of ethylphenidate can be formed in vivo when ethanol and methylphenidate are coingested, via hepatic transesterification. Ethylphenidate formation appears to be more common when large quantities of methylphenidate and alcohol are consumed at the same time, such as in non-medical use or overdose scenarios. However, the transesterification process of methylphenidate to ethylphenidate, as tested in mice liver, was dominant in the inactive (−)-enantiomer but showed a prolonged and increased maximal plasma concentration of the active (+)-enantiomer of methylphenidate. Additionally, only a small percentage of the consumed methylphenidate is converted to ethylphenidate.

This carboxylesterase-dependent transesterification process is also known to occur when cocaine and alcohol are consumed together, forming cocaethylene.

=== Pharmacodynamics ===
All available data on ethylphenidate's pharmacodynamics are drawn from studies conducted on rodents. Ethylphenidate is more selective to the dopamine transporter (DAT) than methylphenidate, having approximately the same efficacy as the parent compound, but has significantly less activity on the norepinephrine transporter (NET). Its dopaminergic pharmacodynamic profile is nearly identical to methylphenidate, and is primarily responsible for its euphoric and reinforcing effects.

The eudysmic ratio for ethylphenidate is superior to that of methylphenidate.

The following is ethylphenidate's binding profile in the mouse, alongside methylphenidate's. Figures for both the racemic and the dextrorotary enantiomers are given:

Compound	Binding DAT K_{i} (nM)	Binding NET K_{i} (nM)	Uptake DA IC_{50} (nM)	Uptake NE IC_{50} (nM)
d-methylphenidate	139	408	28	46
d-ethylphenidate	276	2479	24	247
dl-methylphenidate	105	1560	24	31
dl-ethylphenidate	382	4824	82	408

== Legality ==
- Ethylphenidate is a schedule II drug under the Convention on Psychotropic Substances.
- Ethylphenidate is illegal in the Netherlands, as the Opium Law List I covers it, as of April 27, 2018
- In the United States, effective November 21, 2024, Etheylphenidate was placed in Schedule I of the Controlled Substances Act.
  - On September 22, 2023, the DEA filed a proposed rule for placement of Ethylphenidate into Schedule I status. Public commenting opened on September 22, 2023, and closed on November 21, 2023.
- Ethylphenidate was made schedule I at the state level in Alabama on March 18th, 2014.
- Ethylphenidate is illegal in Sweden as of December 15, 2012.
- Ethylphenidate is illegal to manufacture, distribute or import in the UK, as of 10 April 2015 it has been placed under a Temporary Class Drug Order which automatically places it in a Class-B-like category. Though ordinarily the TCDO would only last 1 year, the ACMD reported that since its invocation prevalence of MPA had significantly decreased, and that it had been challenging to collect information about the drug. As a result of this, they requested that the TCDO be extended a further year from 26 June 2016.
- Ethylphenidate is illegal in Jersey under the Misuse of Drugs (Jersey) Law 1978.
- Australian state and federal legislation contains provisions that mean that analogues of controlled drugs are also covered by the legislation. Ethylphenidate would be an analogue of methylphenidate under this legislation.
- Ethylphenidate is controlled in Canada under the Controlled Drugs and Substances Act under Schedule III as of May 5, 2017.
- Ethylphenidate is illegal in Germany as of May 7, 2013.
- Ethylphenidate is illegal in Austria by the "Neue Psychoaktive Substanzen Gesetz" (New Psychoactive Substances Act) NPSG since 1 January 2012
- Ethylphenidate is illegal in Denmark as of February 1, 2013.
- Ethylphenidate is illegal in Poland by "the Act on Counteracting Drug Addiction" since July 1, 2015.
- It is illegal in Lithuania to use, buy, possess, transport, sell or import Ethylphenidate from 2015
- As of October 2015, ethylphenidate is a controlled substance in China.
- In Finland ethylphenidate is scheduled in government decree on substances, preparations and plants considered to be narcotic drugs.

== See also ==
- Alcohol (drug)
- Ethanol
- HDEP-28
- HDMP-28
- Naphthylisopropylamine
- Naphyrone
- 2β-Propanoyl-3β-(2-naphthyl)-tropane (WF-23)
- Isopropylphenidate
- Methylphenidate
- Propylphenidate
- 3,4-Dichloromethylphenidate
- 4-Fluoroethylphenidate
- Cocaethylene (compound formed when cocaine and ethanol are taken together)
