= HDMP-28 =

Stimulant drug

Clinical data
- Other names: HDMP28; Methylnaphthidate
- Routes of administration: Oral
- Drug class: Stimulant; Serotonin–norepinephrine–dopamine reuptake inhibitor (SNDRI)

Legal status
- Legal status: CA: Schedule III; DE: NpSG (Industrial and scientific use only); UK: Class B

Identifiers
- IUPAC name: Methyl (naphthalen-2-yl)(piperidin-2-yl)acetate
- CAS Number: 231299-82-4 219915-69-2 (HCl)
- PubChem CID: 9817261
- ChemSpider: 7993011
- UNII: T52Y9T2U0W

Chemical and physical data
- Formula: C_{18}H_{21}NO_{2}
- Molar mass: 283.371 g·mol^{−1}
- 3D model (JSmol): Interactive image; Interactive image
- SMILES: O=C(OC)[C@H](C1=CC2=C(C=C1)C=CC=C2)[C@]3([H])CCCCN3; O=C(OC)[C@H](c2cc1ccccc1cc2)[C@@H]3NCCCC3
- InChI: InChI=1S/C18H21NO2/c1-21-18(20)17(16-8-4-5-11-19-16)15-10-9-13-6-2-3-7-14(13)12-15/h2-3,6-7,9-10,12,16-17,19H,4-5,8,11H2,1H3/t16-,17-/m1/s1; Key:DNRNSIJBSCBESJ-IAGOWNOFSA-N

HDMP-28 or methylnaphthidate is a stimulant drug of the piperidine and naphthylaminopropane groups, closely related to methylphenidate (Ritalin), but with the benzene ring replaced by naphthalene. It is a potent dopamine reuptake inhibitor, with several times the potency of methylphenidate and a short duration of action, and is a structural isomer of another potent dopamine reuptake inhibitor, N,O-dimethyl-4-(2-naphthyl)piperidine-3-carboxylate (DMNPC). It has been sold as a designer drug since around 2015.

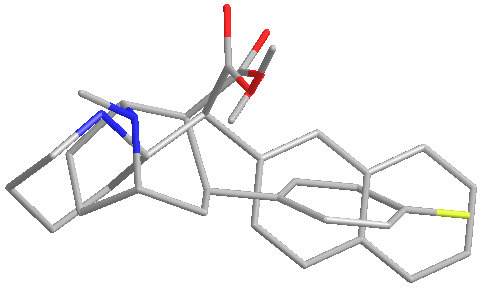
HDMP-28 and CFT overlay

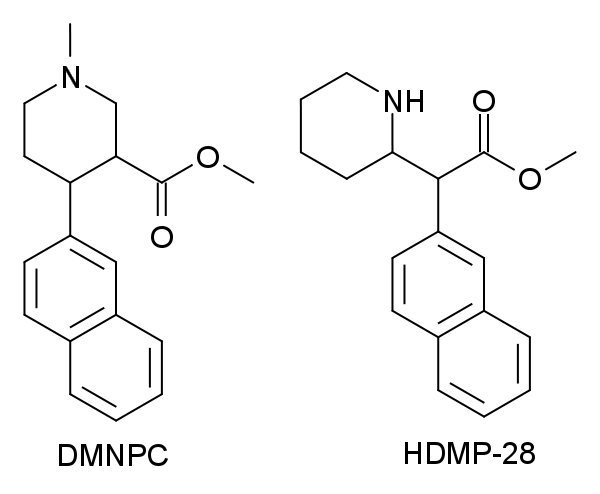

Most of the TMP analogs of HDMP-28 have SERT Ki values in the range >10,000 and so are selective for dopamine and noradrenaline reuptake, with little or no effect on serotonin. HDMP-28 has high affinity to SERT, and so behaves as a triple reuptake inhibitor.

^{a}Effect of (dl-threo) TMP and analogs on DA and 5-HT Transporters.
Inhibition of specific analogs at displacing CFT from binding to DAT & RTI-55 from binding to SERT
Ar	[^{3}H]CFT DAT	[^{3}H]DA Uptake	[^{3}H]RTI-55 SERT	Inhibition by 10 μM	D.R.	Potency
Ph	83.9	224	≫10,000	19.6	2.7	1.00
p-F	35.0	142	>10,000	36.9	4.1	3.33
m-Cl	5.1	23.0	>10,000	45.5	4.5	2.42
p-Me	33.0	126	>10,000	45.0	3.8	0.74
p-NH_{2}	34.5	114	≫10,000	7.9	3.3	2.18
m,p-Cl_{2}	5.3 (2.67)^{b}	7.0	1,064 (>10,000)^{b}	93.3	1.3	7.98
β-Naphthyl	33.9^{b} 11.0^{c}	53.0^{c}	71.6^{b}	ND	4.8^{c}	—
Cocaine	160	404	401	nd	2.5	0.41
^{a}Schweri, et al. (2002); ^{b}Davies, et al. (2004); ^{c}Deutsch, et al. (2001).

D.R. is the discrimination ratio = [3H]DA ÷ [3H]CFT.

A low D.R. indicates more addictive, whereas a high D.R. indicates low propensity for self-administration.

== Legality ==
HDMP-28 is illegal in Switzerland as of December 2015.

== See also ==
- Substituted naphthylethylamine
- List of methylphenidate analogues
- 3-Bromomethylphenidate
- 3,4-Dichloromethylphenidate
- BMAPN
- Ethylphenidate
- HDEP-28
- Naphthylisopropylamine
- Naphyrone
- 2β-Propanoyl-3β-(2-naphthyl)-tropane (WF-23)
- Isopropylphenidate
- Propylphenidate
