= LR-5182 =

Stimulant drug

Clinical data
- Other names: (cis)-LR-5182, (cis)-LR-5182 hydrochloride

Identifiers
- IUPAC name: 1-[(2R,3S)-3-(3,4-dichlorophenyl)-2-bicyclo[2.2.2]octanyl]-N,N-dimethylmethanamine
- CAS Number: HCl: 62373-97-1
- PubChem CID: 44024; HCl: 44023
- ChemSpider: 40076; HCl: 40075
- ChEMBL: ChEMBL322067
- CompTox Dashboard (EPA): DTXSID601027508

Chemical and physical data
- Formula: C_{17}H_{23}Cl_{2}N
- Molar mass: 312.28 g·mol^{−1}
- 3D model (JSmol): Interactive image; HCl: Interactive image
- SMILES: CN(C)C[C@@H]1C2CCC(CC2)[C@@H]1c3ccc(Cl)c(Cl)c3; HCl: [Cl-].C[NH+](C)C[C@@H]1C2CCC(CC2)[C@@H]1c3ccc(Cl)c(Cl)c3
- InChI: InChI=1S/C17H23Cl2N/c1-20(2)10-14-11-3-5-12(6-4-11)17(14)13-7-8-15(18)16(19)9-13/h7-9,11-12,14,17H,3-6,10H2,1-2H3/t11?,12?,14-,17-/m1/s1; Key:JOQQHMGSIKNGAF-HLFYOVGASA-N; HCl: InChI=1S/C17H23Cl2N.ClH/c1-20(2)10-14-11-3-5-12(6-4-11)17(14)13-7-8-15(18)16(19)9-13;/h7-9,11-12,14,17H,3-6,10H2,1-2H3;1H/t11?,12?,14-,17-;/m1./s1; Key:CWRRQXXGIKGNJA-PQTJMFGHSA-N

LR-5182 is a stimulant drug which acts as a norepinephrine–dopamine reuptake inhibitor, structurally related to the better known drug fencamfamine. It was developed by the pharmaceutical company Eli Lilly in the 1970s, and researched for potential use as an antidepressant, although never marketed. LR-5182 has two stereoisomers, both of which are active, although one isomer blocks reuptake of only dopamine and noradrenaline, while the other blocks reuptake of serotonin as well.

While LR-5182 itself never proceeded beyond initial animal studies, discovery of monoamine reuptake inhibition activity and stimulant effects in drugs of this type has subsequently led to the development of many other stimulant drugs of related chemical structure, primarily developed as potential antidepressants, or as substitute drugs for the treatment of cocaine abuse.
