= Rimiterol =

Chemical compound

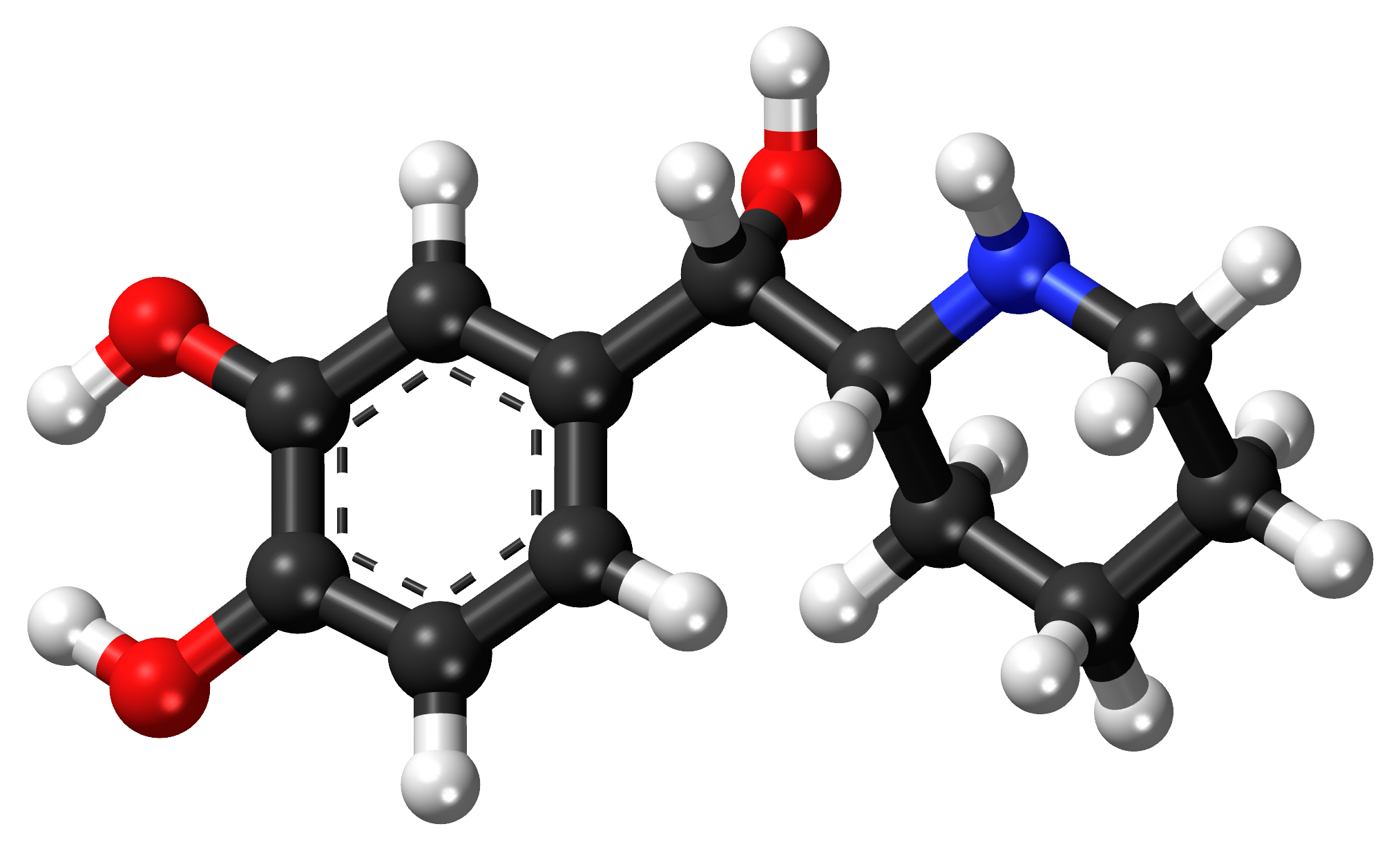

Clinical data
- Pregnancy category: AU: A
- ATC code: R03AC05 (WHO)

Legal status
- Legal status: AU: S4 (Prescription only)

Identifiers
- IUPAC name: 4-{(S)-hydroxy[(2R)-piperidin-2-yl]methyl}benzene-1,2-diol
- CAS Number: 32953-89-2
- PubChem CID: 36283
- ChemSpider: 33366
- UNII: 26GIW6ZLPH
- ChEMBL: ChEMBL1097630
- CompTox Dashboard (EPA): DTXSID70186603
- ECHA InfoCard: 100.046.627

Chemical and physical data
- Formula: C_{12}H_{17}NO_{3}
- Molar mass: 223.272 g·mol^{−1}
- 3D model (JSmol): Interactive image
- SMILES: O[C@@H](c1ccc(O)c(O)c1)[C@@H]2NCCCC2
- InChI: InChI=1S/C12H17NO3/c14-10-5-4-8(7-11(10)15)12(16)9-3-1-2-6-13-9/h4-5,7,9,12-16H,1-3,6H2/t9-,12+/m1/s1; Key:IYMMESGOJVNCKV-SKDRFNHKSA-N

Rimiterol (INN/USAN) is a third-generation short-acting β_{2} agonist.

== See also ==
- Substituted phenethylamine
- Isoprenaline
- Colterol
