= 2β-Propanoyl-3β-(2-naphthyl)-tropane =

Chemical compound

Pharmacokinetic data
- Bioavailability: High
- Elimination half-life: Slow

Identifiers
- IUPAC name: 1-[(1S,3S,4R,5R)-8-methyl-3-naphthalen-2-yl-8-azabicyclo[3.2.1]octan-4-yl]propan-1-one
- CAS Number: 146877-60-3
- PubChem CID: 10447943
- ChemSpider: 8623360
- UNII: 7KN3H3NMW6

Chemical and physical data
- Formula: C_{21}H_{25}NO
- Molar mass: 307.437 g·mol^{−1}
- 3D model (JSmol): Interactive image
- SMILES: CCC(=O)[C@H]1[C@H]2CC[C@@H](C[C@@H]1c3ccc4ccccc4c3)N2C
- InChI: InChI=1S/C21H25NO/c1-3-20(23)21-18(13-17-10-11-19(21)22(17)2)16-9-8-14-6-4-5-7-15(14)12-16/h4-9,12,17-19,21H,3,10-11,13H2,1-2H3/t17-,18+,19+,21+/m0/s1; Key:WJVLEIDMFWNIAA-QEUVDIPISA-N

2β-Propanoyl-3β-(2-naphthyl)-tropane or WF-23 (Wake Forest-23, named after the university where it was first created) is a cocaine analogue. It is several hundred times more potent than cocaine at being a serotonin-norepinephrine-dopamine reuptake inhibitor.

As can be seen on PubMed, these acyl substituted phenyltropanes are highly potent MAT inhibitors and also have a very long half-life, spanning perhaps at least a few days; as the half-life of the dopamine transporter in rats was found to be 2–3 days under normal conditions (with agonists, antagonists, and transporter inhibitors altering the half-life), it may be that WF-23 largely or mostly binds to its transporters until they are degraded.

WF-23 is made from methyl-ferruginine i.e. PC10080982 [152668-77-4].

== See also ==
- HDEP-28
- HDMP-28
- List of cocaine analogues
- Ferruginine
