= 3,4-Dichloromethylphenidate =

Stimulant drug

3,4-DCMP
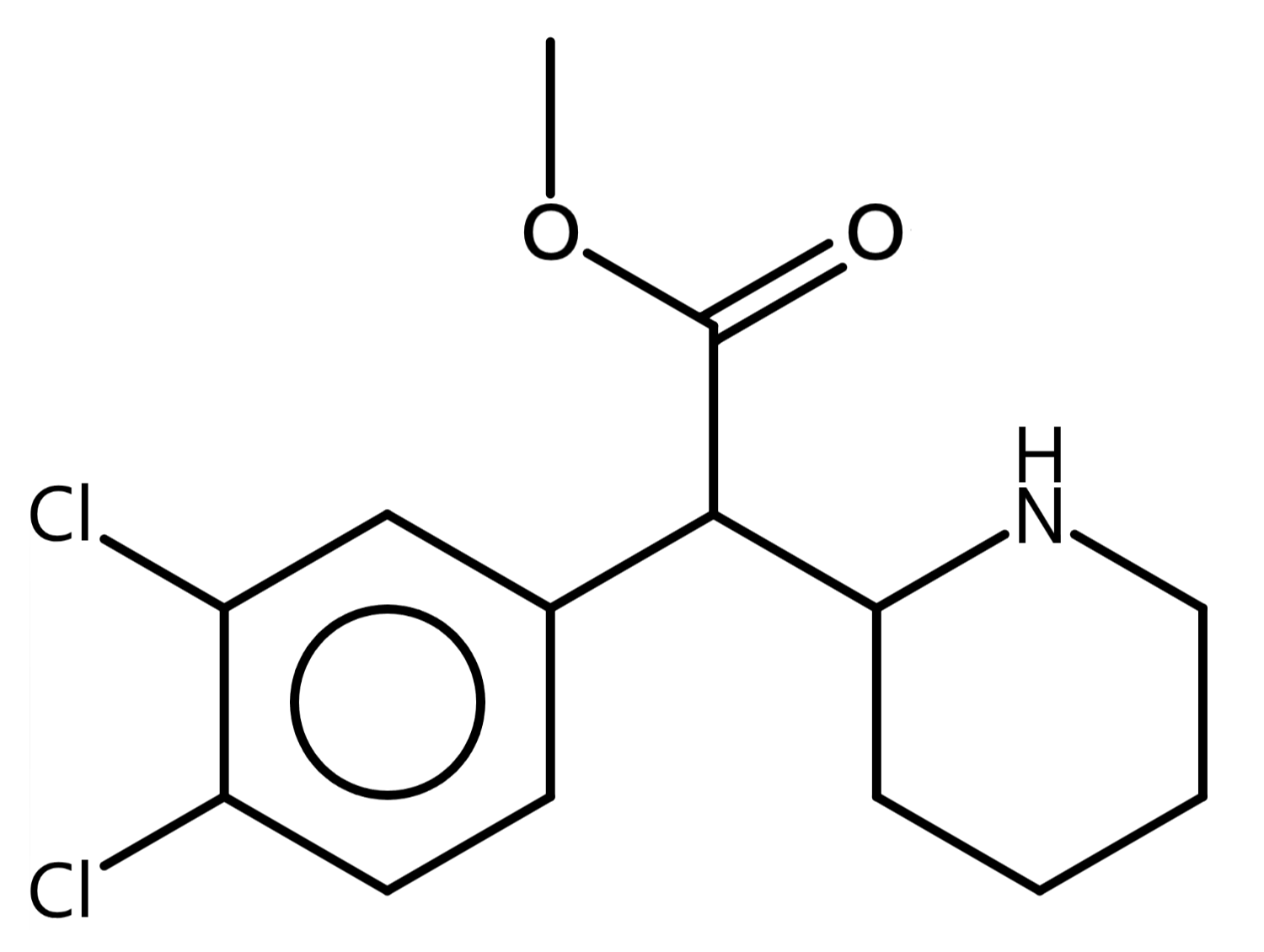

Clinical data
- Routes of administration: oral, insufflation, rectal
- ATC code: none

Legal status
- Legal status: CA: Schedule III; DE: NpSG (Industrial and scientific use only); UK: Class B

Pharmacokinetic data
- Metabolism: Primarily by the liver
- Excretion: Predominantly renal

Identifiers
- IUPAC name: Methyl 2-(3,4-dichlorophenyl)-2-(piperidin-2-yl)acetate
- CAS Number: 1400742-68-8
- PubChem CID: 44418862
- ChemSpider: 23278471
- UNII: F7LN3N6ZLA
- CompTox Dashboard (EPA): DTXSID30658831

Chemical and physical data
- Formula: C_{14}H_{17}Cl_{2}NO_{2}
- Molar mass: 302.20 g·mol^{−1}
- 3D model (JSmol): Interactive image
- SMILES: COC(=O)C(c1ccc(c(c1)Cl)Cl)C2CCCCN2
- InChI: InChI=1S/C14H17Cl2NO2/c1-19-14(18)13(12-4-2-3-7-17-12)9-5-6-10(15)11(16)8-9/h5-6,8,12-13,17H,2-4,7H2,1H3; Key:JUKMAYKVHWKRKY-UHFFFAOYSA-N

3,4-dichloromethylphenidate (abbreviated as 3,4-DCMP, and incorrectly as 3,4-CTMP for the d,l-threo diastereomer) is a potent stimulant drug from the phenidate class closely related to methylphenidate. It acts as a potent serotonin-norepinephrine-dopamine reuptake inhibitor with a long duration of action. It has been sold online as a designer drug.

== Chemistry ==
3,4-DCMP is the 3,4-dichlorinated analogue of methylphenidate. The 3,4-dichlorination is a common modification done to most monoamine reuptake inhibitors.

== Pharmacology ==
=== Pharmacodynamics ===
The result of the 3,4-dichlorination on 3,4-DCMP is a higher selectivity for the serotonin transporter and serotonin uptake inhibition. Serotonergic activity among phenidates is very rare, and 3,4-DCMP is one of only three compounds from this class with appreciable serotonergic activity, the other two being HDMP-28 & HDEP-28. The reason for the serotonergic activity of all three compounds is a bulky aryl ring system (in the case of the aforementioned compounds, a 2-naphthalene ring), which mimics the bicyclic indole ring system of serotonin. Examples of compounds with the same SAR modifications done to increase serotonergic activity include naphthylaminopropane and 3,4-dichloroamphetamine.

The 3,4-dichloro group also increases resistance to metabolism, which can be seen on the compound's greatly increased duration of action and biological half-life. Furthermore, it also results in a greatly increased affinity for both the dopamine and noradrenaline transporters, because the 3,4-dichloro group more closely mimics the 3,4-dihydroxy group found on dopamine and adrenaline. Examples of compounds with the same SAR modification done to increase affinity to DAT & NET include dichloropane and O-2390.

3,4-CTMP, the d,l-threo diastereomer of 3,4-DCMP, is approximately seven times more potent than methylphenidate in animal studies, but has weaker reinforcing effects due to its slower onset of action. However, H. M. Deutsch's discrimination ratio implies it to be more reinforcing than cocaine.

Inhibition of [^{125}I]RTI-55 Binding and [^{3}H]Monoamine Uptake of 3,4-DCMP diastereomers, and related compounds.
| Compound | DAT (Ki, nM) | DA uptake IC50 (nM) | SERT (Ki, nM) | 5HT uptake IC50 (nM) | NET (Ki, nM) | NE uptake IC50 (nM) | NET/DAT selectivity | NE/DA uptake selectivity |
|---|---|---|---|---|---|---|---|---|
| 3,4-CTMP | 1.4 ± 0.1 | 23 ± 3 | 1,600 ± 150 | 540 ± 110 | 14 ± 6 | 10 ± 1 | 10.0 | 0.43 |
| 3,4-CEMP^{1} | 90 ± 14 | 800 ± 110 | 2,500 ± 420 | 1,100 ± 90 | 4,200 ± 1,900 | 190 ± 50 | 46.7 | 0.24 |
| TMP^{2} | 110 ± 9 | 110 ± 9 | 65,000 ± 4,000 | 5,100 ± 7,000 | 660 ± 50 | 61 ± 14 | 6.0 | 0.77 |
| Cocaine | 500 ± 65 | 240 ± 15 | 340 ± 40 | 250 ± 40 | 500 ± 90 | 210 ± 30 | 1.0 | 0.88 |

- ^{1} This is an abbreviation of the d,l-erythro diastereomer of 3,4-DCMP.
- ^{2} This is an abbreviation of d,l-threomethylphenidate, more widely known by its brand name Ritalin.

== Legality ==
As of November 2016 3,4-DCMP (aka 3,4-CTMP) is now included in Canada's CDSA as a schedule III substance.

As of October 2015 3,4-CTMP is a controlled substance in China.

3,4-CTMP was banned in the UK as a Temporary Class Drug from April 2015 following its unapproved sale as a designer drug.

Sweden's public health agency suggested to classify 3,4-CTMP as hazardous substance on 10 November 2014.

== See also ==
- 3-Bromomethylphenidate
- 4-Methylmethylphenidate
- Cilobamine
- Dichloropane
- HDEP-28
- HDMP-28
- Isopropylphenidate
- LR-5182
- O-2390
- Propylphenidate
