= RTI-126 =

Pharmaceutical drug

Legal status
- Legal status: NZ: Temporary Class

Identifiers
- IUPAC name: (2S,3S)-8-Methyl-2-(3-methyl-1,2,4-oxadiazol-5-yl)-3-phenyl-8-azabicyclo[3.2.1]octane
- CAS Number: 146659-37-2; HCl: 147059-95-8
- PubChem CID: 71095000
- UNII: 4PX95UA5MZ

Chemical and physical data
- Formula: C_{17}H_{21}N_{3}O
- Molar mass: 283.375 g·mol^{−1}
- 3D model (JSmol): Interactive image
- SMILES: CC1=NOC(=N1)[C@H]2[C@H](CC3CCC2N3C)C4=CC=CC=C4
- InChI: InChI=1S/C17H21N3O/c1-11-18-17(21-19-11)16-14(12-6-4-3-5-7-12)10-13-8-9-15(16)20(13)2/h3-7,13-16H,8-10H2,1-2H3/t13?,14-,15?,16+/m1/s1; Key:QSHBOMWRGOGQOF-KNIAUWFNSA-N

RTI-126 (RTI-4229-126 or (–)-2β-(1,2,4-oxadiazol-5-methyl)-3β-phenyltropane) is a phenyltropane derivative which acts as a potent monoamine reuptake inhibitor and stimulant drug, and has been sold as a designer drug. It is around 5 times more potent than cocaine at inhibiting monoamine reuptake in vitro, but is relatively unselective. It binds to all three monoamine transporters, although still with some selectivity for the dopamine transporter. RTI-126 has a fast onset of effects and short duration of action, and its pharmacological profile in animals is among the closest to cocaine itself out of all the drugs in the RTI series. Its main application in scientific research has been in studies investigating the influence of pharmacokinetics on the abuse potential of stimulant drugs, with its rapid entry into the brain thought to be a key factor in producing its high propensity for development of dependence in animals. RTI-126 has been sold as a designer drug, and was scheduled in New Zealand as a temporary class drug on 27 December 2012.

The structurally related compound (–)-2β-(3-methyl-5-isoxazolyl)nortropane is a potent and selective agonist for nicotinic acetylcholine receptors, with twice the potency of nicotine.

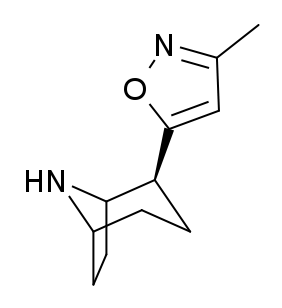
(–)-2β-(3-methyl-5-isoxazolyl)nortropane

== See also ==
- 3-FPO
- RTI-111
- WIN 35,065-2
- WIN 35428
- List of cocaine analogues
