= Dexmethylphenidate =

Central nervous system stimulant

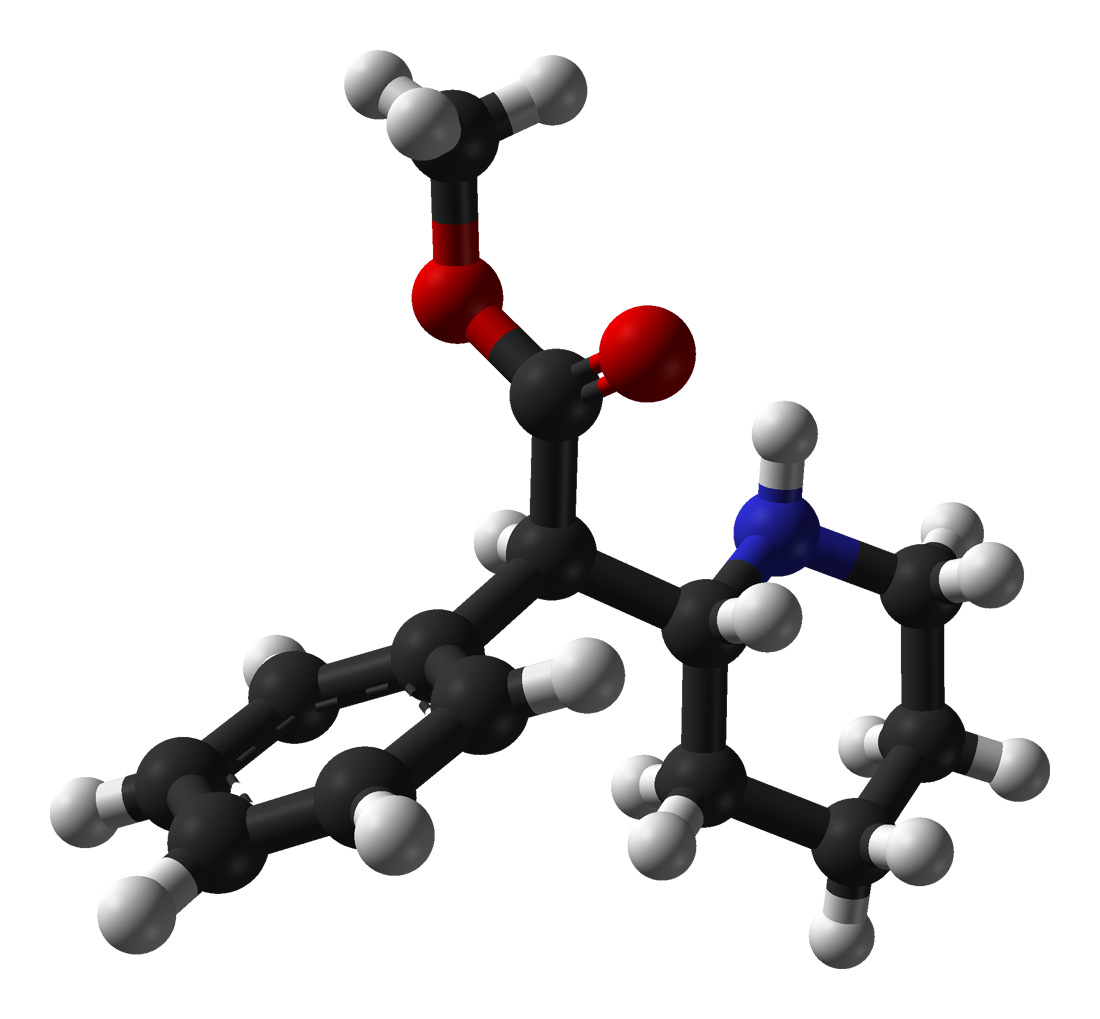

Clinical data
- Trade names: Focalin, Focalin XR, others
- Other names: (2R,2′R)–(+)–methylphenidate, (αR,2R)–(+)–methylphenidate, d-threo-methylphenidate (d-TMP), d-methylphenidate (d-MPH)
- AHFS/Drugs.com: Monograph
- MedlinePlus: a603014
- License data: US DailyMed: Dexmethylphenidate
- Dependence liability: Physical: None; Psychological: Moderate
- Addiction liability: Moderate
- Routes of administration: By mouth
- ATC code: N06BA11 (WHO)

Legal status
- Legal status: AU: S8 (Controlled drug); CA: Schedule III; DE: Anlage III (Special prescription form required); UK: Class B; US: Schedule II; UN: Psychotropic Schedule II; In general: ℞ (Prescription only)

Pharmacokinetic data
- Bioavailability: 11–52%
- Protein binding: 30%
- Metabolism: Liver
- Elimination half-life: 4 hours
- Excretion: Kidney

Identifiers
- IUPAC name: (R,R)-(+)-Methyl 2-phenyl-2-(2-piperidyl)acetate
- CAS Number: 40431-64-9; hydrochloride: 19262-68-1
- PubChem CID: 154101; hydrochloride: 154100
- IUPHAR/BPS: 7554
- DrugBank: DB06701; hydrochloride: DBSALT001458
- ChemSpider: 135807; hydrochloride: 135806
- UNII: M32RH9MFGP; hydrochloride: 1678OK0E08
- KEGG: D07806; hydrochloride: D03721
- ChEBI: CHEBI:51860
- ChEMBL: ChEMBL827; hydrochloride: ChEMBL904
- CompTox Dashboard (EPA): DTXSID70893769

Chemical and physical data
- Formula: C_{14}H_{19}NO_{2}
- Molar mass: 233.311 g·mol^{−1}
- 3D model (JSmol): Interactive image; hydrochloride: Interactive image
- SMILES: O=C([C@@H]([C@@H]1NCCCC1)C2=CC=CC=C2)OC; hydrochloride: Cl.[H][C@@](C(=O)OC)(C1=CC=CC=C1)[C@@]1([H])CCCCN1
- InChI: InChI=1S/C14H19NO2/c1-17-14(16)13(11-7-3-2-4-8-11)12-9-5-6-10-15-12/h2-4,7-8,12-13,15H,5-6,9-10H2,1H3/t12-,13-/m1/s1; Key:DUGOZIWVEXMGBE-CHWSQXEVSA-N; hydrochloride: InChI=1S/C14H19NO2.ClH/c1-17-14(16)13(11-7-3-2-4-8-11)12-9-5-6-10-15-12;/h2-4,7-8,12-13,15H,5-6,9-10H2,1H3;1H/t12-,13-;/m1./s1; Key:JUMYIBMBTDDLNG-OJERSXHUSA-N

Dexmethylphenidate, sold under the brand name Focalin among others, is a central nervous system (CNS) stimulant used in the treatment of attention deficit hyperactivity disorder (ADHD) in those over the age of five years. It is taken by mouth. The immediate-release formulation lasts up to five hours while the extended-release formulation lasts up to twelve hours. It is the more active enantiomer of methylphenidate. Methylphenidate has been shown to be more effective than atomoxetine and superior in treating ADHD symptoms when compared.

Common side effects include abdominal pain, loss of appetite, and fever. Serious side effects may include psychosis, sudden cardiac death, mania, anaphylaxis, seizures, and priapism. Safety during pregnancy and breastfeeding is unclear.

Dexmethylphenidate was approved for medical use in the United States in 2001. It is available as a generic medication. In 2023, it was the 127th most commonly prescribed medication in the United States, with more than 4 million prescriptions. Brand name Focalin XR has been discontinued in 2026, although generic formulations remain available.

== Medical uses ==
Dexmethylphenidate is used as a treatment for attention deficit hyperactivity disorder (ADHD), usually along with psychological, educational, behavioral or other forms of treatment. It is proposed that stimulants help ameliorate the symptoms of ADHD by making it easier for the user to concentrate, avoid distraction, and control behavior. Placebo-controlled trials have shown that once-daily dexmethylphenidate XR was effective and generally well tolerated.

Improvements in ADHD symptoms in children were significantly greater for dexmethylphenidate XR versus placebo. It also showed greater efficacy than osmotic controlled-release oral delivery system (OROS) methylphenidate over the first half of the laboratory classroom day but assessments late in the day favoured OROS methylphenidate.

== Contraindications ==
Methylphenidate is contraindicated for individuals with agitation, tics, glaucoma, heart defects, or a hypersensitivity to any ingredients contained in methylphenidate pharmaceuticals.

Pregnant women are advised to take methylphenidate only if the benefits outweigh the potential risks. Not enough human studies have been conducted to conclusively demonstrate an effect of methylphenidate on fetal development. In 2018, a review concluded that it has not been teratogenic in rats and rabbits, and that it "is not a major human teratogen".

=== Hypertension ===
Patients with preexisting high blood pressure or hypertension are at an increased risk of having symptoms worsen due to the use of CNS stimulants.

=== Cardiac disease ===
Sudden death has been reported in patients taking CNS stimulants with cardiac structural abnormalities, arrhythmias, coronary disease, or other forms of cardiac disease. Careful assessment and adjustments to dosage are recommended.

=== Glaucoma ===
Dexmethylphenidate can increase intraocular pressure(IOP) due to dilation of the pupils. In patients with preexisting glaucoma, IOP can cause further damage to the optic nerve.

== Adverse effects ==
Products containing dexmethylphenidate have a side effect profile comparable to those containing methylphenidate.

Addiction experts in psychiatry, chemistry, pharmacology, forensic science, epidemiology, and the police and legal services engaged in delphic analysis regarding 20 popular recreational drugs. Methylphenidate was ranked 13th in dependence, 12th in physical harm, and 18th in social harm.

The most common side effects associated with methylphenidate (in standard and extended-release formulations) are appetite loss, dry mouth, anxiety/nervousness, nausea, and insomnia. Gastrointestinal adverse effects may include abdominal pain and weight loss. Nervous system adverse effects may include bruxism, akathisia (agitation/restlessness), irritability, dyskinesia (tics), lethargy (drowsiness/fatigue), and dizziness. Cardiac adverse effects may include palpitations, changes in blood pressure and heart rate (typically mild), and tachycardia (rapid heart rate). Ophthalmologic adverse effects may include blurred vision and dry eyes, with less frequent reports of diplopia and mydriasis. In some cases, tolerance might be an issue with stimulants like methylphenidate.

Results from a 2024 systematic review showed that methylphenidate significantly improves ADHD symptoms and broadband measures but can cause appetite suppression and other adverse events in children and adolescents. Smokers with ADHD who take methylphenidate may increase their nicotine dependence, and smoke more often than before they began using methylphenidate, with increased nicotine cravings and an average increase of 1.3 cigarettes per day.

There is some evidence of mild reductions in height with prolonged treatment in children. This has been estimated at 1 centimetre (0.4 in) or less per year during the first three years with a total decrease of 3 centimetres (1.2 in) over 10 years.

Hypersensitivity (including skin rash, urticaria, and fever) is sometimes reported when using transdermal methylphenidate. The Daytrana patch has a much higher rate of skin reactions than oral methylphenidate.

Methylphenidate can worsen psychosis in people who are psychotic, and in very rare cases it has been associated with the emergence of new psychotic symptoms. It should be used with extreme caution in people with bipolar disorder due to the potential induction of mania or hypomania. There have been very rare reports of suicidal ideation. Some authors claim that evidence does not support a link. Logorrhea is occasionally reported, and visual hallucinations are very rarely reported. Priapism is a very rare adverse event that can be potentially serious.

U.S. Food and Drug Administration–commissioned studies in 2011 indicate that in children, young adults, and adults, there is no association between serious adverse cardiovascular events (sudden death, heart attack, and stroke) and the medical use of methylphenidate or other ADHD stimulants.

Because some adverse effects may only emerge during chronic use of methylphenidate, a constant watch for adverse effects is recommended.

A 2018 Cochrane review found the drug "may be associated with a number of serious adverse events as well as a large number of non‐serious adverse events in children and adolescents". It stated "it is not possible to accurately estimate the actual risk of adverse events" because the quality of evidence in the 260 studies assessed was "very low". (Note: "Our findings suggest that methylphenidate may be associated with a number of serious adverse events as well as a large number of non-serious adverse events in children." "Concerning adverse events associated with the treatment, our systematic review of randomised clinical trials (RCTs) demonstrated no increase in serious adverse events, but a high proportion of participants suffered a range of non-serious adverse events.")

=== Overdose ===
The symptoms of a moderate acute overdose of methylphenidate primarily arise from central nervous system overstimulation; these symptoms include: vomiting, nausea, agitation, tremors, hyperreflexia, muscle twitching, euphoria, dysphoria, confusion, hallucinations, delirium, hyperthermia, sweating, flushing, headache, tachycardia, heart palpitations, cardiac arrhythmias, hypertension, mydriasis, and dryness of mucous membranes. A severe overdose may involve symptoms such as hyperpyrexia, sympathomimetic toxidrome, convulsions, paranoia, stereotypy (a repetitive movement disorder), rhabdomyolysis, coma, and circulatory collapse. (Note: The management of amphetamine, dextroamphetamine, and methylphenidate overdose is largely supportive, with a focus on interruption of the sympathomimetic syndrome with judicious use of benzodiazepines. In cases where agitation, delirium, and movement disorders are unresponsive to benzodiazepines, second-line therapies include antipsychotics such as ziprasidone or haloperidol, central alpha-adrenoreceptor agonists such as dexmedetomidine, or propofol. ... However, fatalities are rare with appropriate care.) A methylphenidate overdose is rarely fatal with appropriate care. Following injection of methylphenidate tablets into an artery, severe toxic reactions involving abscess formation and necrosis have been reported.

Treatment of a methylphenidate overdose typically involves the administration of benzodiazepines, with antipsychotics, α-adrenoceptor agonists and propofol serving as second-line therapies.

=== Addiction and dependence ===
Methylphenidate displays addiction and dependence liability similar to that of amphetamine. It has moderate liability among addictive drugs; addiction and psychological dependence may occur, particularly when methylphenidate is used at high doses or in non-medical contexts. Methylphenidate has the potential to induce euphoria due to its pharmacodynamic effect (i.e., dopamine reuptake inhibition) in the brain's reward system. At therapeutic doses, ADHD stimulants do not sufficiently activate the reward system; consequently, when taken as directed in doses that are commonly prescribed for the treatment of ADHD, methylphenidate use lacks the capacity to cause an addiction. Non-medical routes of administration, such as intranasal insufflation (snorting) or intravenous injection, produce a more rapid increase in brain methylphenidate concentrations than oral administration and are associated with greater subjective euphoria, reinforcing effects, and abuse potential.

==== Biomolecular mechanisms ====
Repeated high-dose administration of methylphenidate has been shown to induce the expression of ΔFosB in D1-type medium spiny neurons of the nucleus accumbens, with accumbal ΔFosB levels accumulating over the long-term with chronic exposure due to its unusually long half-life. Overexpression (i.e., a persistently excessive level of gene expression) of ΔFosB in this subset of neurons is a necessary and sufficient biomolecular mechanism for many of the neural adaptations and reward-related behavioral changes associated with drug addiction (e.g., reward sensitization and compulsive drug self-administration).

== Interactions ==
Methylphenidate (MPH) is widely described in the pharmacological literature as being metabolized primarily, and almost exclusively, by carboxylesterase 1 into its inactive metabolite, ritalinic acid (RA). However, enzyme-induction and inhibition data, together with structural biochemical analyses of MPH and related analogues, challenge this CES1-only framework. Accumulating evidence strongly indicates that CYP2B6, CYP2E1, and CYP3A4 contribute substantially to the clearance and metabolic fate of methylphenidate.

Studies examining CYP2B6 show that induction by agents such as carbamazepine produces a marked reduction in circulating methylphenidate concentrations, whereas inhibition—including reports involving turmeric constituents—results in elevated plasma levels and a prolonged duration of action. CYP2E1 has been shown to catalyse α-hydroxylation of the methylphenidate ester side chain, a reaction that promotes its spontaneous degradation to ritalinic acid; inhibition of this isoenzyme, most notably by alcohol, correspondingly increases methylphenidate exposure. CYP3A4 also plays a clinically relevant role, particularly in the presence of ethanol, wherein it mediates the transesterification of methylphenidate to ethylphenidate, an active metabolite. Induction of CYP3A4, including observations associated with glucose-stimulated pathways, increases metabolic flux through this route and can alter drug levels while shortening the duration of effect.

Taken together, these findings indicate that the classical view of methylphenidate metabolism as governed solely by CES1 is incomplete. A multi-enzyme model better accounts for observed clinical pharmacokinetics and drug–drug interactions, with CYP2B6 serving as a major clearance pathway, CYP2E1 generating ritalinic acid through α-hydroxylation, and CYP3A4 producing ethylphenidate in ethanol-containing conditions. Methylphenidate may inhibit the metabolism of vitamin K anticoagulants, certain anticonvulsants, and some antidepressants (tricyclic antidepressants, and selective serotonin reuptake inhibitors). Concomitant administration may require dose adjustments, possibly assisted by monitoring of plasma drug concentrations. There are several case reports of methylphenidate inducing serotonin syndrome with concomitant administration of antidepressants.

When methylphenidate is coingested with ethanol, a small amount of ethylphenidate is formed through CES1-mediated transesterification. At therapeutic doses, ethylphenidate is generally a minor metabolite, with most of the metabolite formed being the pharmacologically less active l-isomer. However, ethanol also increases exposure to pharmacologically active d-methylphenidate, and the potential contribution of d-ethylphenidate may become more relevant at high or abusive doses. Therefore, ethylphenidate should not be assumed to be pharmacologically negligible in methylphenidate-ethanol overdose.

Coingestion of alcohol also increases the blood plasma levels of d-methylphenidate by up to 40%.

Liver toxicity from methylphenidate is extremely rare, but limited evidence suggests that intake of β-adrenergic agonists with methylphenidate may increase the risk of liver toxicity.

== Pharmacology ==
=== Pharmacokinetics ===
Dexmethylphenidate has a 4–6 hour duration of effect. A long-acting formulation, Focalin XR, which spans 12 hours is also available and has been shown to be as effective as DL (dextro-, levo-)-TMP (threo-methylphenidate) XR (extended release) (Concerta, Ritalin LA), with flexible dosing and good tolerability. It has also been demonstrated to reduce ADHD symptoms in both children and adults. d-MPH has a similar side-effect profile to MPH and can be administered without regard to food intake.

CTx-1301 is an experimental medication that is an extended-release formulation of dexmethylphenidate that has a half life more than an hour longer than extended-release dexmethylphenidate (d-MPH-ER). It is under development for ADHD.

=== Mechanism of action ===
Methylphenidate is a catecholamine reuptake inhibitor that indirectly increases catecholaminergic neurotransmission by inhibiting the dopamine transporter (DAT) and norepinephrine transporter (NET), which are responsible for clearing catecholamines from the synapse, particularly in the striatum and meso-limbic system. Moreover, it is thought to "increase the release of these monoamines into the extraneuronal space."

In Vitro studies show Methylphenidate possesses weak affinity for 5-HT_{1A} receptors and acts as a partial agonist.

Methylphenidate, by acting as a negative allosteric modulator of the DAT transporter, prevents dopamine molecules from being absorbed into DAT. This modulation makes DAT less efficient at coupling sodium and chloride gradients to drive inward dopamine transport. Instead, DAT is shifted to the outward-facing state, making it harder to use the sodium gradient (positive charge that normally pulls dopamine inward) and the chloride gradient (negative charge that normally stabilizes the cycle). In this outward conformation, dopamine is “pulled” from the cytosol into the synapse while reuptake is blocked. By keeping DAT outward-facing, sodium coupling is disrupted, chloride coupling is decreased, and inward turnover destabilized. This biases DAT toward outward release, allowing dopamine to leak out without fully coupling to ions. As a result, dopamine is no longer tightly gated by sodium binding, and the firing rate of dopamine from DAT increases.

Although four stereoisomers of methylphenidate (MPH) are possible, only the threo diastereoisomers are used in modern practice. There is a high eudysmic ratio between the SS and RR enantiomers of MPH. Dexmethylphenidate (d-threo-methylphenidate) is a preparation of the RR enantiomer of methylphenidate. In theory, D-TMP (d-threo-methylphenidate) can be anticipated to be twice the strength of the racemic product.

Compd	DAT (K_{i})	DA (IC_{50})	NET (K_{i})	(IC_{50})
D-TMP	161	23	206	39
L-TMP	2250	1600	>10K	980
DL-TMP	121	20	788	51

== Chemistry ==
Dexmethylphenidate a d-threo isomer of methylphenidate which means both chiral centers are in the R configuration. It possesses a Piperidine ring, Phenyl ring and a Methyl Ester group. It is structurally similar to Dopamine and Norepinephrine due to fact that all three molecules contain a Phenethylamine Moiety. It is this similarity that allows Dexmethylphenidate to bind to the Dopamine Transporter (DAT) and the Norepinephrine Transporter (NET).
