= Isopropylphenidate =

Stimulant designer drugs

Clinical data
- Drug class: Stimulant; Norepinephrine-dopamine reuptake inhibitor

Legal status
- Legal status: CA: Schedule III; UK: Class B

Identifiers
- IUPAC name: propan-2-yl 2-phenyl-2-(piperidin-2-yl)acetate
- CAS Number: 93148-46-0
- PubChem CID: 68314762
- ChemSpider: 48062090
- UNII: N93Y7VG3XF
- CompTox Dashboard (EPA): DTXSID001032294

Chemical and physical data
- Formula: C_{16}H_{23}NO_{2}
- Molar mass: 261.365 g·mol^{−1}
- 3D model (JSmol): Interactive image
- SMILES: C1(=CC=CC=C1)C(C(=O)OC(C)C)C2CCCCN2
- InChI: InChI=1S/C16H23NO2/c1-12(2)19-16(18)15(13-8-4-3-5-9-13)14-10-6-7-11-17-14/h3-5,8-9,12,14-15,17H,6-7,10-11H2,1-2H3; Key:AZVPADMEIMLODT-UHFFFAOYSA-N

Isopropylphenidate (also known as IPH and IPPD) is a piperidine based stimulant drug, closely related to methylphenidate, but with the methyl ester replaced by an isopropyl ester. It has similar effects to methylphenidate but with a longer duration of action, and was banned in the UK as a Temporary Class Drug from April 2015 following its unapproved sale as a designer drug.

It has been researched as potential methylphenidate replacement for ADHD and narcolepsy, because of fewer side effects.

== See also ==
- 3,4-Dichloromethylphenidate
- Ethylphenidate
- Desoxypipradrol
- HDEP-28
- HDMP-28
- Propylphenidate
