= List of designer drugs =

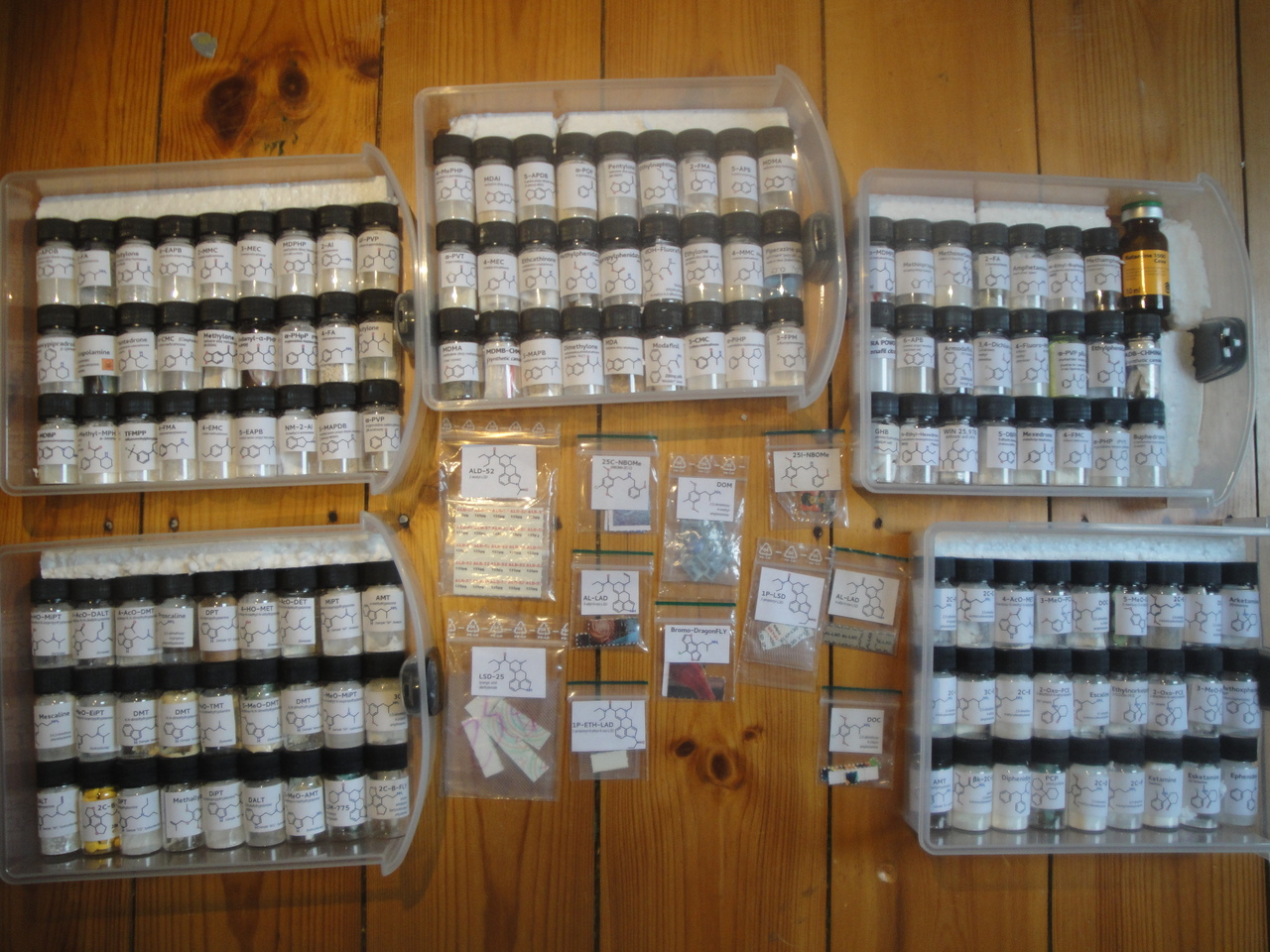
An assortment of several designer drugs.

Designer drugs are structural or functional analogues of controlled substances that are designed to mimic the pharmacological effects of the parent drug while avoiding detection or classification as illegal. Many of the older designer drugs (research chemicals) are structural analogues of psychoactive tryptamines or phenethylamines but there are many other chemically unrelated new psychoactive substances that can be considered part of the designer drug group. Designer drugs can also include substances that are not psychoactive in effect, such as analogues of controlled anabolic steroids and other performance and image enhancing drugs (PIEDs), including nootropics, weight loss drugs and erectile dysfunction medications. The pharmaceutical activities of these compounds might not be predictable based strictly upon structural examination. Many of the substances have common effects while structurally different or different effects while structurally similar due to SAR paradox. As a result of no real official naming for some of these compounds, as well as regional naming, this can all lead to potentially hazardous mix ups for users. The following list is not exhaustive.

== Dissociatives ==
Dissociatives are a class of hallucinogens which distort perceptions of sight and sound and produce feelings of detachment - dissociation - from the environment and self. This is done through reducing or blocking signals to the conscious mind from other parts of the brain. Although many kinds of drugs are capable of such action, dissociatives are unique in that they do so in such a way that they produce hallucinogenic effects, which may include sensory deprivation, dissociation, hallucinations, and dream-like states or trances. Some, which are nonselective in action and affect the dopamine and/or opioid systems, may be capable of inducing euphoria. Many dissociatives have general depressant effects and can produce sedation, respiratory depression, analgesia, anesthesia, and ataxia, as well as cognitive and memory impairment and amnesia.

=== Arylcyclohexylamines ===
Arylcyclohexylamines are the oldest and most widely used dissociatives. The class includes the well known anaesthetic, ketamine.

- 2-Bromodeschloroketamine, 2-BDCK, Bromoketamine, 2-Bromoketamine
- 2-Fluorodeschloroketamine, 2-FDCK, Fluoroketamine, 2-Fluoroketamine
- 3-Fluorodeschloroketamine, 3-FDCK, FXM, 3-Fluoroketamine
- 2'-Oxo-PCE, Eticyclidinone, O-PCE, Deschloroethylnorketamine, 2-DCNEK
- 2'-Oxo-3-F-PCE, Fluoroeticyclidinone, Fluorxetamine
- 2'-Oxo-3-Me-PCE, Deoxymethoxetamine, DMXE
- 2-Trifluoromethyldeschloroketamine, 2-TFMDCK
- 3-Cl-PCP
- 3-F-PCP
- 3-HO-PCE, Hydroxyeticyclidine
- 3-HO-PCP
- 3-Me-PCE
- 3-Me-PCP
- 3-Me-PCPy, 3-Methylrolicyclidine
- 3-MeO-PCE
- 3-MeO-PCMo
- 3-MeO-PCP
- 4-MeO-PCP, Methoxydine
- Deschloroketamine, 2'-Oxo-PCM, 2-DCK, DCK, O-PCM
- Eticyclidine, PCE, CI-400
- Methoxetamine, MXE, 3-MeO-2'-Oxo-PCE
- Methoxmetamine, MXM, MMXE, 3-MeO-2'-Oxo-PCM, E-MXE
- Methoxpropamine, MXPr, 3-MeO-2'-Oxo-PCPr
- Methoxisopropamine, MXiPR, Isopropyloxetamine
- Methoxyketamine, 2-MeO-2-Deschloroketamine, 2-MeO-Ketamine
- N-Ethylnorketamine, NENK, N-Ethylketamine

=== 1,2-Diarylethylamines ===
1,2-Diarylethylamines began to appear on grey markets only as recently as 2013.

- 2-Chloro-Ephenidine
- 2-MeO-Ephenidine
- Diphenidine
- Ephenidine, NEDPA, EPE
- Fluorolintane
- Methoxphenidine, 2-MeO-Diphenidine, MXP
- N-Methylephenidine, "Ephenidine-2"
- N-Ethyl-lanicemine

=== Misc ===
- Dizocilpine, MK-801
- PD-137889 (P-89)
- 8A-PDHQ

== Psychedelics ==
A psychedelic substance is a psychoactive drug whose primary action is to alter cognition and perception. Psychedelics tend to affect and explore the mind in ways that result in the experience being qualitatively different from those of ordinary consciousness. The psychedelic experience is often compared to non-ordinary forms of consciousness such as trance, meditation, yoga, religious ecstasy, dreaming and even near-death experiences.

=== Benzofurans ===
- 5-MeO-DiBF
- Dimemebfe, aka 5-MeO-Benzofuranethanamine, 5-MeO-BFE

==== 2C-x ====
2C-x class of psychedelics are 2,5-dimethoxy-phenethylamine derivatives.

- 2C-B
- 2C-B-AN, Brolphetaminil
- 2C-B-FLY
- 2C-C
- 2C-D, 2C-M
- 2C-E, "Europa"
- 2C-G
- 2C-iP, "Jelena"
- 2C-I
- 2C-P
- 2C-T-2
- 2C-T-4
- 2C-T-7
- 2C-T-21
- βk-2C-B
- BOB, β-Methoxy-2C-B
- BOD, β-Methoxy-2C-D
- BOH-2C-B, β-Hydroxy-2C-B, βOH-2CB
- HOT-7
- N-Ethyl-2C-B

==== DOx ====
The DOx family of psychedelics are also known as "substituted amphetamines" as they contain the amphetamine backbone but are substituted on the benzene ring. This gives rise to serotonin agonists similar to the 2C-X class but more resistant to elimination in the body.

- Aleph, DOT
- Bromo-DragonFLY, DOB-DragonFLY
- DOB
- DOC
- DOE, DOET, "Hecate"
- DOI
- DOiPR, DOiP
- DOM, "STP"
- DON
- DOPR
- TMA-2
- TMA-6

==== NBxx ====
- 2CBCB-NBOMe
- 25B-NB23DM
- 25B-NB25DM
- 25B-NBF
- 25B-NBOH
- 25B-NBOMe, "Nova", Cimbi-36
- 25C-NBF
- 25C-NBOH
- 25C-NBOMe, "Pandora", Cimbi-82
- 25D-NBOMe, "Divination"
- 25E-NBOMe
- 25I-NBF, Cimbi-21
- 25I-NBMD, Cimbi-29
- 25I-NBOH, Cimbi-27
- 25I-NBOMe, Cimbi-5, "Solaris", "N-Bomb"
- 25iP-NBOMe
- 25H-NBOMe
- 25N-NBOMe
- 25P-NBOMe
- Mescaline-NBOMe

==== NNxx ====
25-NM:
- 25B-NMe7BF
- 25B-NMe7BT
- 25B-NMe7Bim
- 25B-NMe7Box
- 25B-NMe7DHBF
- 25B-NMe7Ind
- 25B-NMe7Indz
- 25B-NMePyr
- 25I-NMe7DHBF
- 25I-NMeFur
- 25I-NMeTHF
- 25I-NMeTh

=== Lysergamides ===
Lysergamides are amide derivatives of the alkaloid lysergic acid.

- 1B-LSD, 1-Butanoyl-LSD
- 1cP-AL-LAD, 1-Cyclopropionyl-6-Allyl-6-Nor-LSD
- 1cP-LSD, 1-Cyclopropionyl-LSD
- 1cP-MiPLA, 1-Cyclopropionylmethylisopropyllysergamide
- 1D-LSD, 1,2-Dimethylcyclobutane-1-carbonyllysergamide
- 1P-AL-LAD, 1-Propionyl-AL-LAD
- 1P-ETH-LAD, 1-Propionyl-ETH-LAD
- 1P-LSD, 1-Propionyl-LSD
- 1S-LSD, 1-(3-(trimethylsilyl)propionyl)-LSD
- 1V-LSD, 1-Valeroyl-LSD, Valerie
- ALD-52, 1-Acetyl-LSD
- AL-LAD, 6-Allyl-6-Nor-LSD
- ETH-LAD, 6-Ethyl-6-Nor-LSD
- LSM-775, N-Morpholinyllysergamide
- LSZ, LA-SS-Az
- MiPLA, Methylisopropyllysergamide
- 1Fe-LSD, 1-(ferrocenecarbonyl)-LSD

=== Tryptamines ===
Drugs containing the tryptamine moiety are typically substrates for the serotonin receptors, in keeping with their close structural resemblance to serotonin, a neurotransmitter.

- 4-AcO-DALT, Dalcetin
- 4-AcO-DET, Ethacetin
- 4-AcO-DiPT, Ipracetin
- 4-AcO-DMT, Psilacetin
- 4-AcO-DPT, Depracetin
- 4-AcO-EiPT, Ethipracetin
- 4-AcO-MET, Metacetin
- 4-AcO-MiPT, Mipracetin
- 4-HO-DALT, Dalocin
- 4-HO-DET, Ethocin
- 4-HO-DiPT, Iprocin
- 4-HO-DPT, Deprocin
- 4-HO-MET, Metocin
- 4-HO-MiPT, Miprocin
- 4-HO-MPMI, Lucigenol
- 4-HO-McPT
- 4-HO-MPT, Meprocin
- 4-HO-EPT
- 4-MeO-MiPT
- 5-Bromo-DMT
- 5-Chloro-DMT
- 5-MeO-DALT
- 5-MeO-DET
- 5-MeO-DiPT, Foxy Methoxy
- 5-MeO-DMT
- 5-MeO-DPT
- 5-MeO-EiPT
- 5-MeO-EPT
- 5-MeO-MALT
- 5-MeO-MET
- 5-MeO-MiPT, Moxy Methoxy
- 5-MeO-MPMI
- 5-MeO-NiPT
- 5-MeO-TMT, Indapex
- DALT, Diallyltryptamine
- DET, Diethyltryptamine
- DiPT, Diisopropyltryptamine
- DPT, Dipropyltryptamine
- 4-PO-DET, Ethocybin, CEY-19
- EiPT, Ethylisopropyltryptamine
- EPT, Ethylpropyltryptamine
- MiPT, Methylisopropyltryptamine
- McPT, Methylcyclopropyltryptamine
- EcPT
- PcPT
- MET, Methylethyltryptamine

== Entactogens ==
Entactogens are a class of psychoactive drugs that produce distinctive emotional and social effects similar to those of MDMA. Users of entactogens say the drugs often produce feelings of empathy, love, and emotional closeness to others.

=== Amphetamines ===
Substituted amphetamines are a chemical class of stimulants, entactogens, hallucinogens, and other drugs. They feature a phenethylamine core with a methyl group attached to the alpha carbon resulting in amphetamine, along with additional substitutions.

- 4-BA, 4-Bromoamphetamine, PBA
- 4-CA, 4-Chloroamphetamine, PCA
- 4-CMA, 4-Chloromethamphetamine, PCMA
- 4-FA, 4-Fluoroamphetamine, PFA
- 4-FMA, 4-Fluoromethamphetamine, PFMA
- 4-Fluoroselegiline, 4F-Deprenyl
- 4-MA, 4-Methylamphetamine, PAL-313
- 4-MeOA, 4-Methoxyamphetamine, PMA, 4-MeO-A, "Death"
- 4-MeOMA, 4-Methoxymethamphetamine, PMMA, 4-MeO-MA
- 4-MTA, 4-Methylthioamphetamine
- Methamnetamine, N-Methyl-PAL-287, Methylnaphetamine, MNT, MNA
- MMA, 3-Methoxy-4-Methylamphetamine
- 3-FEA, 3F-Ethamphetamine, 3-Fluoroethamphetamine

=== Benzofurans ===
Benzofurans are similar in structure to MD(M)A but differ in that the methylenedioxy groups have been modified, removing one of the two oxygens in the methylenedioxy ring to render a benzofuran ring.

- 5-APB
- 5-EAPB
- 5-MAPB
- 5-APDB
- 5-MAPDB
- 5-MBPB
- 6-APB, "Benzo Fury"
- 6-EAPB
- 6-MAPB
- 6-APDB
- 6-MAPDB

=== MDxx ===
Substituted methylenedioxyphenethylamines (MDxx) are a large chemical class of derivatives of the phenethylamines, which includes many psychoactive drugs that act as entactogens, psychedelics, and/or stimulants, as well as entheogens.

- 5-Methoxymethylone, βk-MMDMA, "2-A1MP"
- 5-Methylethylone, 5-Me-βk-MDEA, 5-ME
- 5-Methyl-MDA
- Butylone, βk-MBDB
- Dibutylone, βk-DMBDB
- Difluoromethylenedioxyamphetamine, DiFMDA
- Dimethylone, βk-MDDMA, "M11"
- Dipentylone, βk-DMBDP
- EBDB, Ethylbenzodioxolylbutanamine
- EDMA, Ethylenedioxymethylamphetamine
- EFLEA, N-Hydroxy-EDMA
- Ethylone, βk-MDEA
- Eutylone, βk-EBDB, N-Ethyl-Butylone
- FLEA, Methylenedioxyhydroxymethamphetamine, MDHMA
- MBDP, Methylbenzodioxylpentanamine
- MBDB, Methylbenzodioxylbutanamine, "Eden"
- MDEA, Methylenedioxyethylamphetamine, MDE, "Eve"
- Methylenedioxyhydroxyamphetamine, MDOH
- Methylenedioxydeschlorobupropion, N-Tert-Butyl-Methylone
- Methylone, βk-MDMA
- MMDA, 5-MeO-MDA
- MMDA-2, 6-MeO-MDA
- Pentylone, βk-MBDP
- Putylone, βk-PDBD, N-Propylbutylone

=== Phenethylamines ===
Drugs containing the phenethylamine moiety bear close structural resemblance to dopamine but substitution on the benzene ring gives rise to drugs with a much higher affinity for serotonin receptors.

- 2C-B
- 2C-C
- 2C-D
- 2C-E
- 2C-I
- 2C-P
- 3C-E
- 3C-P
- Allylescaline, "AL"
- Escaline, "E"
- Isoproscaline, "IP"
- Methallylescaline, "MAL"
- Proscaline, "P"

=== Miscellaneous polycyclic phenethylamines ===
Indane and tetralin-type phenethylamines are vaguely related to their amphetamine analogues.

- MDMAI
- 5-APDI, Indanylaminopropane, IAP
- MDAI
- MEAI, "Chaperon"
- NM-2-AI

Only one non-tryptamine indole has been sold, 5-IT. It shows strong MAOI activity.

- 5-IT, 5-API, PAL-571

=== Tryptamines ===
Drugs containing the tryptamine moiety are typically substrates for the serotonin receptors, due to their close structural resemblance to serotonin.

- αET, α-Ethyltryptamine, "Monase"
- 5-MeO-αET, α,O-Diethylserotonin
- αMT, α-Methyltryptamine, "Indopan"
- 5-MeO-αMT, α,O-Dimethylserotonin

=== Piperazines ===
Piperazine containing designer drugs have effects similar to MDMA (ecstasy). This class of drugs activates 5-HT receptor subtypes that release norepinephrine and dopamine.

- 2C-B-BZP
- 3-Chlorophenylpiperazine, meta-Chlorophenylpiperazine, mCPP
- 4-Fluorophenylpiperazine, para-Fluorophenylpiperazine, pFPP, 4-FPP, Fluoperazine, Flipiperazine
- 4-Methoxyphenylpiperazine, para-Methoxyphenylpiperazine, MeOPP, pMPP, 4-MPP, Paraperazine
- Benzylpiperazine, BZP
- Dibenzylpiperazine, DBZP
- Difluoromethylenedioxybenzylpiperazine, DF-MDBP, DB-MDBP
- Methoxypiperamide, MEOP, MEXP
- Methylbenzylpiperazine, MBZP
- Methylenedioxybenzylpiperazine, MDBZP, Piperonylpiperazine
- Trifluoromethylphenylpiperazine, TFMPP

== Stimulants ==
Stimulants produce a variety of different kinds of effects by enhancing the activity of the central and peripheral nervous systems. Common effects, which vary depending on the substance and dosage in question, may include enhanced alertness, awareness, wakefulness, endurance, productivity, and motivation, increased arousal, locomotion, heart rate, and blood pressure, and the perception of a diminished requirement for food and sleep.

=== Amphetamines ===
Amphetamines are a chemical class of stimulants, entactogens, hallucinogens, and other drugs. They feature a phenethylamine core with a methyl group attached to the alpha carbon resulting in amphetamine, along with additional substitutions.

- 2-FA, 2-Fluoroamphetamine
- 2-FMA, 2-Fluoromethamphetamine
- 2-MA, 2-Methylamphetamine, Ortetamine
- 3-FA, 3-Fluoroamphetamine
- 3-FMA, 3-Fluoromethamphetamine
- 3-Methylamphetamine, 3-MA, meta-Methamphetamine
- β-Phenylmethamphetamine
- N,alpha-Diethylphenylethylamine, EAPB

=== Cathinones ===
Cathinones include some stimulants and entactogens, which are derivatives of cathinone. They feature a phenethylamine core with an alkyl group attached to the alpha carbon, and a ketone group attached to the beta carbon, along with additional substitutions.

- 2-Chloromethcathinone, 2-CMC
- 2-Fluoromethcathinone, 2-FMC
- 2-Methylethcathinone, 2-MEC
- 2-Methylmethcathinone, 2-MMC
- 2,4-Dimethylethcathinone, 2,4-DMEC
- 2,4-Dimethylmethcathinone, 2-Methylmephedrone, 2,4-DMMC
- 3,4-Dimethylmethcathinone, 3,4-DMMC
- 3,4-Dimethyl-N-ethylbuphedrone, 3,4-DMNEB
- 3,4-Dimethyl-N-ethylpentedrone, 3,4-DMNPD
- 3-Chloromethcathinone, 3-CMC, Clophedrone
- 3-Chloroethcathinone, 3-CEC
- 3-Ethylethcathinone, 3-EEC
- 3-Fluoromethcathinone, 3-FMC
- 3-Fluoro-4-methylmethcathinone, 3-Fluoromephedrone
- 3-Methoxymethcathinone, 3-MeOMC
- 3-Methylethcathinone, 3-MEC
- 3-Methylmethcathinone, 3-MMC
- 4-Bromomethcathinone, 4-BMC, Brephedrone
- 4-Bromoethcathinone, 4-BEC
- 4-Chlorobutylcathinone, 4-CBC
- 4-Chlorodimethylcathinone, 4-CDMC
- 4-Chloroethcathinone, 4-CEC
- 4-Chloroisopropylcathinone, 4-CiPC
- 4-Chloromethcathinone, 4-CMC, Clephedrone
- 4-Ethylethcathinone, 4-EEC
- 4-Ethylmethcathinone, 4-EMC
- 4-Fluoroethcathinone, 4-FEC
- 4-Fluoromethcathinone, Flephedrone, 4-FMC
- 4-Fluoro-NiPP, 4F-IVP, 4-Fluoro-N-Isopropylpentedrone, 4-Fluoro-α-Isopropylamino-Valerophenone, 4-Fluoro-iPAVP, 4-Fluoro-NPP
- 4-Fluoropentedrone, 4-FPD
- 4-Methyl-α-Ethylaminopentiophenone, 4-MEAPP, N-Ethyl-4-Methylpentedrone
- 4-Methylbuphedrone, 4-MeMABP, BZ-6378
- 4-Methylcathinone, 4-MC, Normephedrone
- 4-Methyldimethcathinone, 4-MDMC
- 4-Methylethcathinone, 4-MEC
- 4-Methylpentedrone, 4-MPD
- 4-Methylpropylcathinone, 4-MPC
- Benzedrone, 4-MBC
- Buphedrone, α-Methylamino-Butyrophenone, MABP
- DL-4662, Dimethoxyethylpentedrone, VEVP
- Ephylone, N-Ethylpentylone, βk-Ethyl-K, βk-EBDP
- Ethcathinone, EC
- Hexedrone, α-Methylamino-Caprophenone
- 4-Methylmethcathinone, Mephedrone, 4-MMC, 4-Methylephedrone, "MCAT"
- 4-Methoxymethcathinone, Methedrone, βk-PMMA, 4-Methoxyephedrone, 4-MeoMC
- Mexedrone
- N,N-Diethyl-4-Methcathinone, N,N-DEMC
- N-Ethylbuphedrone, NEB
- N-Ethylheptedrone, HEP
- N-Ethylhexedrone, NEH, "Hexen"
- N-Ethylpentedrone, NEP
- 4-Fluoro-N-Ethylbuphedrone, 4-Fluoro-NEB, 4-FNEB
- NiPH, N-Isopropylnorhexedrone
- NiPP, α-Isopropylamino-Valerophenone, iPAVP, N-Isopropylnorpentedrone, NPP
- Pentedrone, α-Methylamino-Valerophenone, MAVP, PD
- α-Ethylaminopentiophenone, EAPP, N-Ethylpentedrone
- βk-IBP, Indanyl-N-ethylbuphedrone
- βk-IVP, Indanyl-N-ethylpentedrone

=== Oxazolidines ===
Oxazolidines are a five-membered ring compounds consisting of three carbons, a nitrogen, and an oxygen. The oxygen and NH are the 1 and 3 positions, respectively. In oxazolidine derivatives, there is always a carbon between the oxygen and the nitrogen.

- 4'-Bromo-4-methylaminorex, 4'-B-4-MAR, 4B-MAR
- 4'-Chloro-4-methylaminorex, 4'-C-4-MAR, 4C-MAR
- 4'-Fluoro-4-methylaminorex, 4'-F-4-MAR, 4F-MAR
- 4,4'-Dimethylaminorex, 4,4'-DMAR, "Serotoni"

=== Phenylmorpholines ===
Phenylmorpholines are a class of stimulants containing a phenethylamine skeleton in which the terminal amine is incorporated into a morpholine ring. These are mostly based upon Phenmetrazine.

- Isophenmetrazine, PAL-730
- 2-Hydroxy-4'-Ethylphenmetrazine, 2-HO-4'-EPM, 2-Hydroxyphenmetetrazine, N-Ethylphenmetrazol
- 3,4-Methylenedioxyphendimetrazine, MDMPM
- 3-Chlorophenmetrazine, 3-CPM
- 3-Fluorophenetrazine, 3-FPE
- 3-Fluorophenmetrazine, 3-FPM, PAL-593
- 3-Methylphenmetrazine, 3-MPM, PAL-773
- N-Ethylphenmetrazine, Phenmetetrazine
- 4-Methylphenmetrazine, 4-MPM
- 6-Methylphenmetrazine, 6-MPM
- G-130 2-phenyl-5,5-dimethylmorpholine
- Methylmorphenate
- PDM-35, 5-Methylphenmetrazine, 5-MPM
- Phenetrazine, PE

=== Phenidate derivatives ===
Related compounds based on methylphenidate, A common prescription stimulant

- 3,4-Dichloromethylphenidate, 3,4-CTMP
- 4-Benzylpiperidine, 4-PMPD
- 4-Fluoroethylphenidate, 4F-EPH, 4-FEPH
- 4-Fluoromethylphenidate, 4F-MPH, 4-FMPH
- 4-Methylmethylphenidate, 4-Me-TMP, 4-MMPH
- Desoxypipradrol, 2-DPMP, 2-Diphenylmethylpiperidine
- Ethylphenidate, EPH
- HDEP-28, Ethylnaphthidate
- HDMP-28, Methylnaphthidate
- Isopropylphenidate, IPH, IPPD
- Propylphenidate, PPH

=== Cocaine analogues ===
Stimulants based on the tropane alkaloid and recreational stimulant, Cocaine

- 4'-Fluorococaine, 4'-FC
- Dimethocaine, Larocaine
- Meprylcaine
- Nitracaine, 4-Nitro-Dimethocaine
- Troparil, WIN 35,065-2, β-CPT
- Dichloropane, RTI-111, O-401
- 4-Fluorodimethocaine
- Norcocaine
- Vanillylmethylecgonine
- 2′-Acetoxycocaine

=== Pyrrolidines and Pyrrolidinophenones ===
Pyrrolidines are amphetamines with a pyrrolidine group. Pyrrolidinophenones (also called Pyrovalerones) are cathinones (βk-amphetamines) with a pyrrolidine group.

- Diphenylprolinol, D2PM
- 2-Diphenylmethylpyrrolidine, Desoxy-D2PM
- α-Pyrrolidinopropiophenone, α-PPP
- 2',4'-Dimethyl-α-pyrrolidinopropiophenone, DMPPP, 2,4-DM-α-PPP
- 3',4'-Methylenedioxy-α-pyrrolidinopropiophenone, MDPPP, 3,4-MD-α-PPP
- 4'-Chloro-α-pyrrolidinopropiophenone, 4-Chloro-α-PPP
- 4'-Methoxy-α-pyrrolidinopropiophenone, MOPPP, 4-MeO-α-PPP
- 4'-Methyl-α-pyrrolidinopropiophenone, 4-MePPP, MPPP, MαPPP
- α-Pyrrolidinobutiophenone, α-PBP
- 3',4'-Methylenedioxy-α-pyrrolidinobutiophenone, MDPBP, 3,4-MD-α-PBP
- 4'-Fluoro-α-pyrrolidinobutyrophenone, 4-Fluoro-α-PBP
- 4-Methoxy-α-pyrrolidinobutyrophenone, 4-MeO-α-PBP
- 4'-Methyl-α-pyrrolidinobutiophenone, MPBP, 4-Me-α-PBP
- 5-PPDI, Indanyl-α-PBP
- TH-PBP, Cyclohexane-α-PBP
- α-Pyrrolidinobutiothiophenone, α-PBT
- α-PCYP
- α-Pyrrolidinopentiophenone, α-PVP, βk-Prolintane, O-2387
- 2'-Methyl-α-pyrrolidinopentiophenone, 2-Methyl-α-PVP, 2-Me-α-PVP
- α-Pyrrolidino-2-phenylacetophenone, α-D2PV
- 3-Methyl-4-fluoro-α-pyrrolidinopentiophenone, 3-M-4-F-α-PVP, 4F-3M-α-PVP, MFPVP
- 3',4'-Dimethoxy-α-pyrrolidinopentiophenone, 3,4-DMPV
- 3',4'-Dimethyl-α-pyrrolidinopentiophenone, 3,4-DMPV
- 4'-Bromo-α-pyrrolidinopentiophenone, 4-Bromo-α-PVP
- 4'-Chloro-α-pyrrolidinopentiophenone, 4-Chloro-α-PVP
- 4'-Fluoro-α-pyrrolidinopentiophenone, 4-Fluoro-PVP, 4-Fluoro-α-PVP
- 4'-Methoxy-α-pyrrolidinopentiophenone, 4-MeO-α-PVP, 4-MeO-PVP, MOPVP
- 5-DBFPV, 5-Dihydrobenzofuranpyrovalerone, 3-Desoxy-MDPV
- Pyrovalerone, 4-Me-α-PVP, Centroton, Thymergix, O-2371
- Methylenedioxypyrovalerone, MDPV
- Naphyrone, Naphthylpyrovalerone, O-2482
- Pyrophenidone, α-Phenyl-Pyrovalerone
- Indapyrophenidone, Indanyl-α-Phenyl-α-PVP
- TH-PVP, Cyclohexane-α-PVP
- α-Pyrrolidinopentiothiophenone, α-PVT
- α-Pyrrolidinoisohexaphenone, α-PiHP
- α-Pyrrolidinohexiophenone, α-PHP, PV-7
- 3',4'-Dimethoxy-α-PHP, 3,4-DMPHP
- 4'-Fluoro-α-pyrrolidinohexiophenone, 4-Fluoro-α-PHP
- 4'-Methyl-α-pyrrolidinohexiophenone, MPHP, 4-Me-α-PHP, PV-4
- 4'-Methoxy-α-pyrrolidinohexiophenone, 4-MeO-α-PHP
- TH-PHP, Cyclohexane-α-PHP
- 5-BPDI, Indanyl-α-PHP
- Methylenedioxypyrrolidinohexiophenone, MDPHP
- α-Pyrrolidinoheptiophenone, PV-8, α-PHPP
- 4'-Fluoro-α-pyrrolidinoheptiophenone, 4-Fluoro-PV-8, 4-Fluoro-α-PHPP
- 4'-Methoxy-α-pyrrolidinoheptiophenone, 4-MeO-PV-8, 4-MeO-α-PHPP
- α-Pyrrolidinooctanophenone, PV-9, α-POP
- 4'-Fluoro-α-pyrrolidinooctanophenone, 4-Fluoro-PV-9, 4-Fluoro-α-POP
- 4'-Methoxy-α-pyrrolidinooctanophenone, 4-MeO-PV-9, 4-MeO-α-POP
- α-Pyrrolidinononanophenone, PV-10, α-PNP
- 2-Diphenylmethylpyrrolidine, Desoxy-D2PM, 2-Benzhydrylpyrrolidine

=== Thiophenes ===
Thiophenes are stimulant drugs which are analogues of amphetamine or cathinone where the phenyl ring has been replaced by thiophene.

- 5-Methylmethiopropamine, 5-MMPA, "Mephedrene"
- Thiopropamine
- Methiopropamine, MPA
- Thiothinone, βk-MPA
- Cyclo-Methiodrone, TCAT

=== Misc ===
- 1,3-Dimethylbutylamine, 1,3-DMBA, "AMP-Citrate"
- 2-AI
- 2-MPPP, 2-methyl-1-phenyl-3-(piperidin-1-yl)propan-1-one
- Amfonelic acid, AFA, WIN 25,978
- Bromantane
- Camfetamine
- CRL-40,940, Bisfluoromodafinil
- CRL-40,941, Fladrafinil, Fluorafinil
- Diclofensine, Ro 8-4650
- Benocyclidine, BTCP
- Homomazindol
- Mephtetramine, MTTA
- Methylhexanamine, DMAA
- Modafiendz, Methyldifluoromodafinil

== Sedatives ==
Sedatives are substances that induces sedation by reducing irritability or excitement. At higher doses they may result in slurred speech, staggering gait, poor judgment, and slow, uncertain reflexes. Doses of sedatives such as benzodiazepines, when used as a hypnotic to induce sleep, tend to be higher than amounts used to relieve anxiety, whereas only low doses are needed to provide a peaceful effect. In the event of an overdose or if combined with another sedative, many of these drugs can cause unconsciousness and even death.

=== Alcohols ===
- 2-Methyl-2-butanol, 2M2B, tert-Amyl alcohol
- 2-Methyl-2-pentanol

=== Benzodiazepines ===
- 3-Hydroxyphenazepam
- 4'-Chlorodeschloroalprazolam
- Adinazolam
- Bromazolam, 2'-Desfluoroflubromazolam, 8-Bromodeschloroalprazolam
- Bromonordiazepam, Desalkylgidazepam
- Clonazolam, 8-Nitrodeschlorotriazolam, Clonitrazolam
- Cloniprazepam, 1-Cyclopropylmethylclonazepam
- Desalkylgidazepam, Deschlorophenazepam
- Desmethylflunitrazepam, Fonazepam
- Diclazepam, 2'-Chlorodiazepam
- Ethylbromazolam
- Flualprazolam, Fludiazolam
- Flubromazepam
- Flubromazolam
- Flunitrazolam, 2'-Fluorodeschloroclonazolam
- Meclonazepam, 3-Methylclonazepam
- N-Desalkylflurazepam, Norflurazepam
- Nimetazepam, 3-Hydroxynimetazepam
- Nifoxipam, 3-Hydroxydesmethylflunitrazepam
- Nitrazolam
- Phenazepam
- Pyrazolam
- Ro5-4864, 4'-Chlorodiazepam

==== Thienodiazepines ====
- Deschloroclotizolam
- Deschloroetizolam, Etizolam-2
- Etizolam
- Flubrotizolam
- Fluclotizolam
- Metizolam, Desmethyletizolam

=== GHB analogues ===
- 1,4-Butanediol, 1,4-BD
- GBL, γ-Butyrolactone
- GHV, γ-Hydroxyvaleric acid (4-Methyl-GHB)
- GVL, γ-Valerolactone

=== Methaqualone analogues ===
- Afloqualone
- Etaqualone, 2-Ethylnormethaqualone, "ECQ"
- Mebroqualone, 2-Bromonormethaqalone, "MBQ"
- Mecloqualone, 2-Chloronormethaqualone, "MCQ"
- Methylmethaqualone, 4-Methylmethaqualone, "MMQ"
- Nitromethaqualone, 2-Methoxy-4-nitronormethaqualone
- SL-164

=== Opioids ===
Opioids have pharmacologic actions resembling morphine and other components of opium.

- 2-Fluoroviminol, 2F-Viminol
- 2-Methyl-AP-237
- 3-Methylbutyrfentanyl, 3-MBF
- 3-Methylfentanyl, 3-MF
- 4-Chloroisobutyrfentanyl, 4-CliBF, p-CliBF
- 4-Fluorobutyrfentanyl, 4-FBF, p-FBF
- 4-Fluoroisobutyrfentanyl, 4-FiBF, p-FiBF
- 4-Methoxybutyrfentanyl, 4-MeO-BF
- 4-Fluorofentanyl, 4-FF, p-FF
- p-hydroxy-butyrylfentanyl
- Acetylfentanyl, AF
- Acetoxymethylketobemidone, O-AMKD
- Acrylfentanyl
- AH-7921
- α-Methylfentanyl, "China White"
- AP-238
- BDPC, Bromadol
- Bromadoline, U-47931E
- Brorphine
- Bucinnazine, AP-237
- Butonitazene
- Butyrfentanyl, BF
- Clonitazene
- Cyclopentylfentanyl, CP-F
- Cyclopropylfentanyl
- Crotonylfentanyl
- Desmethylprodine, MPPP
- Desmethylmoramide
- Diphenpipenol
- Dipyanone
- 2,2'-Difluorofentanyl
- Etazene, Desnitroetonitazene
- Etonitazene
- Etonitazepyne
- Flunitazene
- Furanylfentanyl, Fu-F
- Isotonitazene
- Isotonitazepyne
- Methoxyacetylfentanyl
- Metodesnitazene
- Metonitazene
- MT-45
- N-Desmethyl-BDPC, Norbromadol
- Nortilidine
- O-Desmethyltramadol, O-DSMT
- Piperidylthiambutene
- Protonitazene
- Tetrahydrofuranylfentanyl, THF-F
- Tianeptine
- U-47700
- U-48800
- U-49900
- U-51754
- Valerylfentanyl, VF

==== Benzimidazole opioids ====
===== Nitazenes =====
- Metonitazene
- Isotonitazene
- N-Desethylisotonitazene

==== N-(2C)-fentanyl ====
- N-(2C-B) fentanyl
- N-(2C-C) fentanyl
- N-(2C-D) fentanyl
- N-(2C-E) fentanyl
- N-(2C-G) fentanyl
- N-(2C-H) fentanyl
- N-(2C-I) fentanyl
- N-(2C-IP) fentanyl
- N-(2C-N) fentanyl
- N-(2C-P) fentanyl
- N-(2C-T) fentanyl
- N-(2C-T-2) fentanyl
- N-(2C-T-4) fentanyl
- N-(2C-T-7) fentanyl
- N-(2C-TFM) fentanyl

=== Misc ===
- 3,4,5-Trimethoxyphenibut
- 4-Fluorophenibut
- Benzylbutylbarbiturate
- Pagoclone
- Phenibut
- Tolibut
- W-18

== Synthetic cannabinoids ==
Agonists of the central cannabinoid receptor type 1 mimic the behavioral effects of cannabis.

=== Classical cannabinoids ===
- Nabilone
- Parahexyl
- Dimethylheptylpyran
- HU-210
- JWH-051
- JWH-133
- HU-243
- AM-087
- Ajulemic acid
- HU-308

=== Cyclohexeylphenol cannabinoids ===
- CP 47,497 and its (C8) homologue cannabicyclohexanol
- CP 55,940
- CP 55,244

=== Indazole based ===
Indazole containing cannabinoid receptor agonists include:

- 4F-ADB, 4F-MDMB-PINACA
- 4F‐MDMB‐BINACA
- 4CN-ADB, 4CN-MDMB-PINACA
- 5C-APINACA, 5C-AKB48
- 5F-AB-PINACA
- 5F-ADB-PINACA
- 5F-ADB, 5F-MDMB-PINACA
- 5F-AMB
- 5F-APINACA, 5F-AKB48
- 5F-CUMYL-PINACA, SGT-25, C-Liquid
- 5F-EMB-PINACA, 5F-AEB
- 5F-MN-18
- 5F-NPB-22
- 5F-SDB-005
- AB-CHMINACA
- AB-FUBINACA, PX-4
- AB-PINACA
- ADAMANTYL-THPINACA
- ADB-BINACA, ADB-BUTINACA
- ADB-CHMINACA, MAB-CHMINACA, "MA-CHMINACA"
- ADB-FUBINACA, MAB-FUBINACA
- ADB-PINACA, MAB-PINACA
- ADSB-FUB-187
- AMB
- AMB-CHMINACA, "MA-CHMINACA"
- AMB-FUBINACA, FUB-AMB, MMB-FUBINACA
- APINACA, AKB48
- APP-BINACA, APP‐BUTINACA
- APP-FUBINACA, PX-4
- BiPICANA
- CUMYL-4CN-BINACA, SGT-78
- CUMYL-PINACA, SGT-24
- CUMYL-THPINACA, SGT-42
- Cumyl-TsINACA
- EMB-FUBINACA, FU-AEB
- FAB-144
- FUB-APINACA, FUB-AKB48
- FUB-NPB-22
- IPO-33
- MDMB-4en-PINACA
- MDMB-CHMINACA, MDMB(N)-CHM
- MDMB-FUBINACA, MDMB(N)-Bz-F, MDMB-Bz-F, FUB-MDMB
- MN-18
- NPB-22
- PX-2, 5F-APP-PINACA, FU-PX, PPA(N)-2201
- PX-3, APP-CHMINACA
- SDB-005
- THJ-018
- THJ-2201

=== Indole based ===
Indole containing cannabinoid receptor agonists include:

- 4-HTMPIPO
- 4F-MDMB-BICA
- 5C-MN-24, 5C-NNEI
- 5F-AB-PICA
- 5F-ADBICA
- 5F-AMB-PICA, I-AMB, MMB-2201
- 5F-AMP
- 5F-EDMB-PICA
- 5F-EMB-PICA
- 5F-NNE1, 5F-NNEI, 5F-MN-24
- 5F-PY-PICA
- 5F-SDB-006
- AB-005
- AB-BICA
- AB-FUBICA
- AB-PICA
- ADB-BICA
- ADB-FUBIATA
- ADB-FUBICA
- ADBICA, ADB-PICA
- APICA, SDB-001, 2NE1
- AMB-CHMICA, MMB-CHMICA, "MA-CHMINACA"
- BzODZ-EPyr
- CH-PIACA
- CUMYL-PEGACLONE, SGT-151
- CUMYL-PICA
- FDU-NNE1, FDU-NNEI, FDU-MN-24
- FUB-144, FUB-UR-144
- LTI-701
- MDMB-CHMICA, incorrectly known as MMB-CHMINACA
- MDMB-FUBICA
- MEPIRAPIM
- MN-25
- NNE1, NNEI, MN-24
- NNL-2
- Org 28611, SCH-900,111
- PTI-1
- PTI-2
- PX-1, 5F-APP-PICA, SRF-30
- SDB-006
- STS-135, 5F-APICA
- UR-144
- XLR-11, 5F-UR-144

==== Adamantoylindoles ====
- AB-001
- AB-002
- AM-1248

==== Benzoylindoles ====
- AM-630
- AM-679
- AM-694
- AM-1241
- AM-2233
- RCS-4

==== Naphthoylindoles ====
- AM-1220
- AM-1221
- AM-1235
- AM-2201
- AM-2232
- CBL-018, NM-018
- EAM-2201
- FUB-JWH-018
- JWH-007
- JWH-015
- JWH-018
- JWH-019
- JWH-073
- JWH-081
- JWH-098
- JWH-116
- JWH-122
- JWH-149
- JWH-182
- JWH-193
- JWH-198
- JWH-200
- JWH-210
- JWH-398
- JWH-424
- MAM-2201
- NE-CHMIMO
- NM-2201, CBL-2201

==== Phenylacetylindoles ====
- JWH-167
- JWH-203
- JWH-249
- JWH-250
- JWH-251
- JWH-320
- RCS-8

==== Quinolinylindoles ====
- 5F-PB-22
- BB-22, QUCHIC
- FDU-PB-22
- FUB-PB-22
- PB-22, QUPIC

=== Miscellaneous cannabinoids ===
- 3-(4-Hydroxymethylbenzoyl)-1-pentylindole
- 5F-AB-FUPPYCA, AZ-037
- 5F-MDA-19
- 5F-PCN, 5F-MN-21
- A-836,339
- AB-CHFUPYCA
- BAY 38-7271
- BIM-018
- CB-13
- EG-018
- EG-2201
- FUBIMINA, BIM-2201, BZ-2201, FTHJ
- JTE-907
- JTE 7-31
- LY-2183240
- MDA-19
- MDMB-CHMCZCA, EGMB-CHMINACA
- NESS-0327
- NESS-040C5
- NNL-1
- QMPSB
- WIN 55,212-2

=== Others ===
- 3-Aminoisobutyric acid
- Acadesine, AICAR
- AWRQNTRYSRIEAIKIQILSKLRL-amide
- Anserine
- beta-Hydroxybutyric acid

== Novel Performance and Image Enhancing Drugs ==
=== Nootropics ===
Nootropics (colloquially brain supplements, smart drugs, cognitive enhancers, memory enhancers, or brain boosters) are chemical substances which purportedly improve cognitive functions, such as attention, memory, wakefulness, and self-control.

==== Modinafil Analogues ====
Novel nootropics based on the selective atypical dopamine reuptake inhibitor Modafinill

- CE-123
- Adrafinil
- CE-125
- CT-005404
- JJC8-088

==== Racetams ====
Racetams are a novel category of drugs, reported to improve cognition

- Aniracetam
- Noopept
- Oxiracetam
- Phenylpiracetam
- Piracetam
- Pramiracetam

=== PDE5 inhibitors ===
PDE5 inhibitors are typically used to treat pulmonary hypertension and erectile dysfunction.

- Acetildenafil
- Aildenafil
- Aminotadalafil
- Gendenafil
- Homosildenafil
- Hydroxyacetildenafil
- Hydroxythiohomosildenafil
- Lodenafil
- Nitrosoprodenafil
- Piperidino acetildenafil
- Piperidinovardenafil
- Sulfoaildenafil
- Thiosildenafil

=== Androgens ===
Androgenic anabolic steroids have approved medical uses as well as illicit use as performance-enhancing drugs to build muscle mass and strength. Anabolic steroids that have been designed to evade detection in sport doping tests are known as "designer steroids".

==== DHT based ====
- 1-Testosterone, Dihydroboldenone
- Desoxymethyltestosterone, Madol, "DMT"
- Dihydrotestosterone, DHT
- Drostanolone, Masteron
- Epiandrosterone
- Mestanolone
- Mesterolone, Proviron
- Metenolone enanthate, Primobolan
- Methasterone, Superdrol, Methasteron, Methyldrostanolone
- Methyl-1-testosterone, M1T
- Oxandrolone, Anavar
- Oxymetholone, Anadrol
- Prostanozol, prodrug for Stanozolol
- Stanozolol, Winstrol

==== Estranes ====
- Dimethandrolone
- Dimethyltrienolone
- Metribolone, Methyltrenbolone
- Mibolerone, Cheque Drops
- Nandrolone, Deca durabolin, NPP
- Norbolethone, Genabol
- Tetrahydrogestrinone, THG, "The Clear"
- Trenbolone
- Trestolone, MENT

==== SARMs ====
Selective androgen receptor modulators (SARMs) are a novel class of androgen receptor ligands. They are intended to maintain the desirable muscle building effects of anabolic steroids while reducing undesirable androgenic actions (e.g., increased risk of prostate cancer). SARMs that are more selective in their action could potentially be used for a broader range of clinical indications other than the relatively limited legitimate uses that anabolic steroids are currently approved for.

- AC-262,356
- Andarine, S-4, GTx-007
- JNJ-28330835
- BMS-564,929
- Enobosarm, Ostarine, GTx-024, MK-2866
- LGD-2226
- LGD-3303
- LGD-4033
- RAD140
- S-40503
- S-23
- YK-11

==== Testosterone based ====
- 4-Chlorodehydromethyltestosterone, Turinabol
- 11-Ketotestosterone
- Adrenosterone
- Boldenone
- Clostebol, 4-Chloro-Testosterone
- Fluoxymesterone, Halotestin
- Methandrostenolone, Dianabol
- Methyltestosterone, Methyltestosterone

=== Peptides ===
==== GHRH analogues ====
GHRH analogues stimulate the release of growth hormone.

- CJC-1293
- CJC-1295
- Sermorelin
- Tesamorelin

==== Growth hormone secretagogue receptor agonists ====
Agonists of the growth hormone secretagogue receptor stimulate the release of growth hormone through the ghrelin receptor.

- Examorelin, Hexarelin
- GHRP-2
- GHRP-6
- Ibutamoren, MK-677, L-163,191
- Ipamorelin

==== Others ====
- BPC-157
- Carnosine
- Delta sleep - inducing peptide
- IGF-1 Ec, MGF
- IGF-1 LR3
- IGF-1 DES
- Melanotan
- Melanotan II
- P21
- TB500
- Human Growth Hormone Fragment 176–191

== See also ==
- Arylcyclohexylamine
- List of cocaine analogues
- List of fentanyl analogues
- List of methylphenidate analogues
- List of androgens and anabolic steroids
- List of psychoactive drugs
- Substituted amphetamine
- Substituted cathinone
- Substituted phenylmorpholine
- Substituted phenethylamine
- Substituted tryptamine
- PiHKAL
- TiHKAL
