= Pyroxamine =

Chemical compound

Identifiers
- IUPAC name: 3-[(4-Chlorophenyl)-phenylmethoxy]-1-methylpyrrolidine
- CAS Number: 7009-68-9
- PubChem CID: 201848
- ChemSpider: 174781
- UNII: V1TGZ00I8U
- CompTox Dashboard (EPA): DTXSID30863988

Chemical and physical data
- Formula: C_{18}H_{20}ClNO
- Molar mass: 301.81 g·mol^{−1}
- 3D model (JSmol): Interactive image
- SMILES: CN1CCC(C1)OC(c2ccccc2)c3ccc(cc3)Cl
- InChI: InChI=1S/C18H20ClNO/c1-20-12-11-17(13-20)21-18(14-5-3-2-4-6-14)15-7-9-16(19)10-8-15/h2-10,17-18H,11-13H2,1H3; Key:CMARNPIDSNAMJM-UHFFFAOYSA-N

Pyroxamine (INN), also known as pyroxamine maleate (USAN) (developmental code names AHR-224, NSC-64540), is an antihistamine and anticholinergic related to diphenylpyraline.

== See also ==
- Benzatropine
- 2-Diphenylmethylpyrrolidine
- Difemetorex
- Diphenylprolinol
- Desoxypipradrol
- Pipradrol
