= C17H19NO =

The molecular formula C_{17}H_{19}NO (molar mass: 253.34 g/mol, exact mass: 253.1467 u) may refer to:

- Benzedrone
- 3-Benzhydrylmorpholine
- Diphenylprolinol
- Nefopam
