= 3-Benzhydrylmorpholine =

Chemical compound

Identifiers
- IUPAC name: 3-(Diphenylmethyl)morpholine
- CAS Number: 93406-27-0
- PubChem CID: 57466051
- ChemSpider: 27289065
- UNII: ZMZ9TR3HUR
- CompTox Dashboard (EPA): DTXSID60726714

Chemical and physical data
- Formula: C_{17}H_{19}NO
- Molar mass: 253.345 g·mol^{−1}
- 3D model (JSmol): Interactive image
- SMILES: C1(C(C2=CC=CC=C2)C3NCCOC3)=CC=CC=C1
- InChI: InChI=1S/C17H19NO/c1-3-7-14(8-4-1)17(15-9-5-2-6-10-15)16-13-19-12-11-18-16/h1-10,16-18H,11-13H2; Key:OVLYYUBKZWEOEQ-UHFFFAOYSA-N

3-Benzhydrylmorpholine is a drug that was developed by American Home Products in the 1950s. It has stimulant and anorectic effects and is related to both pipradrol and phenmetrazine.

== Synthesis ==
Patent:

The Ethyl ester of β-Phenylphenylalanine (Diphenylalanine), i.e. ethyl 2-amino-3,3-diphenylpropanoate (CID:101017845) (1) is the starting material. Lithium aluminium hydride reduction of the ester to the primary alcohol gives 2-amino-3,3-diphenylpropan-1-ol, CID:15798949 (2). Acylation of the primary amine with chloroacetyl chloride [79-04-9] (3) gives 2-chloro-N-(3-hydroxy-1,1-diphenylpropan-2-yl)acetamide (4). Base catalyzed ring closure affords the lactam, i.e. 5-benzhydrylmorpholin-3-one (5). Further treatment with lithium aluminium hydride reduces the lactam function to the morpholine ring, thus 3-benzhydrylmorpholine is formed (6).

== See also ==
- Desoxypipradrol
- β-Phenylmethamphetamine
- 2-Benzhydrylpiperazine
- 3-Benzylmorpholine is also patented (q.v.).
