= C18H15N =

The molecular formula C_{18}H_{15}N (molar mass: 245.32 g/mol, exact mass: 245.1204 u) may refer to:

- Diphenyl-2-pyridylmethane
- Triphenylamine
