= C16H12ClN3O3 =

The molecular formula C_{16}H_{12}ClN_{3}O_{3} (molar mass: 329.738 g/mol, exact mass: 329.0567 u) may refer to:

- Meclonazepam
- Ro05-4082
