= BTQ (disambiguation) =

BTQ can refer to any of the following:

- BTQ-7, the Seven Network owned-and-operated television station in Brisbane, Australia
- Banque de terminologie du Québec, a Quebec-based terminological database now part of Grand dictionnaire terminologique
- 2-Butyl-3-(p-tolyl)quinuclidine, a stimulant drug
- The logical fallacy of Begging The Question
- The ICAO airline designation of Boutique Air
