= C23H32N6O4S =

The molecular formula C_{23}H_{32}N_{6}O_{4}S (molar mass: 488.60 g/mol, exact mass: 488.2206 u) may refer to:

- Aildenafil
- Homosildenafil
- Vardenafil
