= C21H23NO2 =

The molecular formula C_{21}H_{23}NO_{2} may refer to:

- 3-(4-Hydroxymethylbenzoyl)-1-pentylindole, a synthetic cannabinoid
- RCS-4, a synthetic cannabinoid originally sold as OBT-199
