= Diphenyl-2-pyridylmethane =

Names
- Preferred IUPAC name 2-(Diphenylmethyl)pyridine
- Other names 2-Benzhydrylpyridine

Identifiers
| CAS Number | 3678-70-4 |
| 3D model (JSmol) | Interactive image |
| ChemSpider | 69675 |
| ECHA InfoCard | 100.020.867 |
| PubChem CID | 77250 |
| UNII | SZE5F94WJH |
| CompTox Dashboard (EPA) | DTXSID10190244 |
- InChI: InChI=1S/C18H15N/c1-3-9-15(10-4-1)18(16-11-5-2-6-12-16)17-13-7-8-14-19-17/h1-14,18H Key: MMXYNKLYVRNTCK-UHFFFAOYSA-N; InChI=1/C18H15N/c1-3-9-15(10-4-1)18(16-11-5-2-6-12-16)17-13-7-8-14-19-17/h1-14,18H Key: MMXYNKLYVRNTCK-UHFFFAOYAE
- SMILES: n1ccccc1C(c2ccccc2)c3ccccc3

Properties
| Chemical formula | C_{18}H_{15}N |
| Molar mass | 245.325 g·mol^{−1} |
| Melting point | 60-61 °C |
- Except where otherwise noted, data are given for materials in their standard state (at 25 °C [77 °F], 100 kPa). Infobox references

Diphenyl-2-pyridylmethane is a triaryl organic compound that has been used to selectively extract specific metal ions (as their thiocyanate complexes) into organic solvents. Its pharmacology is similar to the stimulant desoxypipradrol in which the pyridine ring is reduced to a piperidine and for which it is a chemical precursor.

== Preparation ==
Diphenyl-2-pyridylmethane was prepared by researchers at Ciba Pharmaceuticals (now Novartis) as the immediate precursor of desoxypipradrol, when they patented the latter as a psychomotor stimulant or narcoleptic. Diphenyl acetonitrile was reacted with 2-bromopyridine, using sodamide as base and the resulting diphenyl-2-pyridylacetonitrile was hydrolysed and decarboxylated using potassium hydroxide in methanol.

== Uses ==
Diphenyl-2-pyridylmethane behaves in coordination complexes with metal cations in the same way as pyridine, with the aromatic nitrogen potentially forming a bond to the metal. In this case, the bulky and lipophilic diphenylmethyl substituent means that the resulting complex may be appreciably soluble in organic solvents like chloroform and benzene. This ability to transfer metal cations from water into non-miscible solvents has been exploited to extract thiocyanate complexes for example of silver, gold, cobalt and zinc; in some cases in the presence of other metals which were retained in the aqueous phase.

== Pharmacology ==
Pipradol and desoxypipradrol are norepinephrine-dopamine reuptake inhibitors that were not in practice widely used as drugs owing to their perceived potential for abuse. Although diphenyl-2-pyridylmethane is less potent than these molecules and its 4-pyridyl equivalent it was nevertheless specifically included when the UK ACMD advised that this group of drugs be controlled as Class B.

== See also ==
- Bisacodyl (the diacetoxy derivative that is used as a laxative)
- Diphenyl-2-pyridylphosphine (a phosphorus atom replaces the central carbon atom).
