= C19H27N3O2 =

The molecular formula C_{19}H_{27}N_{3}O_{2} (molar mass: 329.444 g/mol) may refer to:

- Bavisant (BEN-2001)
- AB-PICA
