= C18H27N =

The molecular formula C_{18}H_{27}N (molar mass: 257.42 g/mol, exact mass: 257.2143 u) may refer to:

- 3-Methyl-PCP
- Butyltolylquinuclidine (BTQ)
