= WY-46824 =

Chemical compound

Identifiers
- IUPAC name: 1-[1-(3-chlorophenyl)-2-(4-methylpiperazin-1-yl)ethyl]cyclohexan-1-ol
- CAS Number: 122718-49-4
- PubChem CID: 10314993
- ChemSpider: 8490458
- UNII: 99T4HMN9HV
- ChEMBL: ChEMBL511347
- CompTox Dashboard (EPA): DTXSID50438031

Chemical and physical data
- Formula: C_{19}H_{29}ClN_{2}O
- Molar mass: 336.90 g·mol^{−1}
- 3D model (JSmol): Interactive image
- SMILES: CN1CCN(CC1)CC(C2=CC(=CC=C2)Cl)C3(CCCCC3)O
- InChI: InChI=1S/C19H29ClN2O/c1-21-10-12-22(13-11-21)15-18(16-6-5-7-17(20)14-16)19(23)8-3-2-4-9-19/h5-7,14,18,23H,2-4,8-13,15H2,1H3; Key:GRUIIAQNNWQJPW-UHFFFAOYSA-N

WY-46824 is a norepinephrine-dopamine reuptake inhibitor related to venlafaxine. It was disclosed by Paige Mahaney and colleagues from Wyeth in 2008. The compound was mentioned in an earlier article from 2007 but was not the main focus of that study.

WY-46824 has binding affinities of 46 nM for the norepinephrine transporter (NET), 58 nM for the dopamine transporter (DAT), and 18795 nM for the serotonin transporter (SERT). The racemic mixture of WY-46824 was resolved into its constituent enantiomers, with the (S)-enantiomer being the more active one. The N-desmethyl derivative of WY-46824 also shows similar activity.
