= Difemetorex =

Defunct piperidine class stimulant

Clinical data
- Routes of administration: Oral
- ATC code: none

Legal status
- Legal status: Withdrawn

Identifiers
- IUPAC name: 2-[2-(diphenylmethyl)piperidin-1-yl]ethanol
- CAS Number: 13862-07-2
- PubChem CID: 65607
- ChemSpider: 59048
- UNII: O0417MPF6W
- ChEMBL: ChEMBL2104291
- CompTox Dashboard (EPA): DTXSID20864449

Chemical and physical data
- Formula: C_{20}H_{25}NO
- Molar mass: 295.426 g·mol^{−1}
- 3D model (JSmol): Interactive image
- SMILES: OCCN1C(CCCC1)C(c2ccccc2)c3ccccc3

Difemetorex (INN) or diphemethoxidine (USAN) is a central nervous system (CNS) stimulant drug introduced in France in 1966 by the pharmaceutical company, Ciba-Geigy; it was briefly used as an appetite suppressant and weight loss aid into the early 1970s, sold under the brand name Cleofil. A member of the piperidine chemical class, difemetorex was described as having such a disruptive and intolerable side effect of insomnia that patient drug compliance suffered and frequency of clinical use decreased, resulting in withdrawal from the market and cessation of production, availability, accessibility, and overall recognition among related substances. It is only known to have been marketed in France, and has remained virtually non-existent in the current era.

Synthesis of difemetorex

== Synthesis ==
Alkylation of desoxypipradrol with ethylene oxide gives difemetorex.

Synthesis of difemetorex

== See also ==
- Desoxypipradrol
- Diphenylprolinol
- SCH-5472
- Fenproporex
- Mefenorex
- Adrafinil
- Ananxyl
- Paroxetine
- Pitolisant
- Raloxifene
- Minoxidil
- N-Methyl-3-piperidyl benzilate (JB-336, BZ)
