= AL-1095 =

Stimulant drug

Clinical data
- ATC code: none

Legal status
- Legal status: In general: unscheduled

Identifiers
- IUPAC name: 2-(1-phenyl-1-(p-chlorophenyl)methyl)-3-hydroxyquinuclidine
- CAS Number: 54549-19-8
- PubChem CID: 3041659
- ChemSpider: 2304906
- UNII: FBM6V6H8CK
- CompTox Dashboard (EPA): DTXSID60969780

Chemical and physical data
- Formula: C_{20}H_{22}ClNO
- Molar mass: 327.85 g·mol^{−1}
- 3D model (JSmol): Interactive image
- SMILES: OC(C1CCN2CC1)C2C(C3=CC=C(Cl)C=C3)C4=CC=CC=C4
- InChI: InChI=1S/C20H22ClNO/c21-17-8-6-15(7-9-17)18(14-4-2-1-3-5-14)19-20(23)16-10-12-22(19)13-11-16/h1-9,16,18-20,23H,10-13H2/t18?,19-,20+/m0/s1; Key:JXCMZYHEZWCLOD-NRRUETGQSA-N

AL-1095, is a centrally acting stimulant drug with comparable effects to amphetamine, developed by Bristol in the 1970s.

== Synthesis ==
Correction:

The first-step is a mixed-aldol condensation between 3-quinuclidinone [3731-38-2] (1) and benzaldehyde (2) gives 2-benzylidene-3-oxoquinuclidine [24123-89-5] (3). The conjugate addition of the Grignard reagent formed from 4-bromochlorobenzene [106-39-8] (4) to the enone gives the benzhydryl (5). MPV reduction of the carbonyl gives the syn stereoisomers, whereas borohydride gave trans. Both diastereoisomers are active but in only one of the enantiomers.

== See also ==
- Butyltolylquinuclidine
- Desoxypipradrol
- SCH-5472
