= Crotonylfentanyl =

Opioid analgesic designer drug

Legal status
- Legal status: BR: Class F1 (Prohibited narcotics); CA: Schedule I; DE: Anlage II (Authorized trade only, not prescriptible); UK: Class A; UN: Narcotic Schedule I

Identifiers
- IUPAC name: (2E)-N-Phenyl-N-[1-(2-phenylethyl)-4-piperidinyl]-2-butenamide
- CAS Number: 760930-59-4
- PubChem CID: 10472960
- ChemSpider: 8648371
- UNII: R0XLG8CO63
- KEGG: C22759

Chemical and physical data
- Formula: C_{23}H_{28}N_{2}O
- Molar mass: 348.490 g·mol^{−1}
- 3D model (JSmol): Interactive image
- SMILES: O=C(/C=C/C)N(c1ccccc1)C3CCN(CCc2ccccc2)CC3
- InChI: InChI=1S/C23H28N2O/c1-2-9-23(26)25(21-12-7-4-8-13-21)22-15-18-24(19-16-22)17-14-20-10-5-3-6-11-20/h2-13,22H,14-19H2,1H3/b9-2+; Key:VDYXGPCGBKLRDA-XNWCZRBMSA-N; InChI=1/C23H28N2O/c1-2-9-23(26)25(21-12-7-4-8-13-21)22-15-18-24(19-16-22)17-14-20-10-5-3-6-11-20/h2-13,22H,14-19H2,1H3/b9-2+; Key:VDYXGPCGBKLRDA-XNWCZRBMBF

Crotonylfentanyl is an opioid analgesic that is an analog of fentanyl and structural isomer of cyclopropylfentanyl and has been sold online as a designer drug. In December 2019, the UNODC announced scheduling recommendations placing crotonylfentanyl into Schedule I.

== See also ==
- Valerylfentanyl
- Acrylfentanyl
