= EG-2201 =

Names
- IUPAC name [9-(5-fluoropentyl)carbazol-3-yl]-naphthalen-1-ylmethanone
- Other names (9-(5-fluoropentyl)-9H-carbazol-3-yl)(naphthalen-1-yl)methanone

Identifiers
| CAS Number | 2365471-72-1 |
| 3D model (JSmol) | Interactive image |
| ChemSpider | DTXSID901342056 |
| PubChem CID | 118796499 |
| UNII | X0IJ1PKG2Q |
| CompTox Dashboard (EPA) | DTXSID901342056 |
- InChI: InChI=1S/C28H24FNO/c29-17-6-1-7-18-30-26-14-5-4-12-23(26)25-19-21(15-16-27(25)30)28(31)24-13-8-10-20-9-2-3-11-22(20)24/h2-5,8-16,19H,1,6-7,17-18H2 Key: LYDDINAZVHIBGP-UHFFFAOYSA-N
- SMILES: C1=CC=C2C(=C1)C=CC=C2C(=O)C3=CC4=C(C=C3)N(C5=CC=CC=C54)CCCCCF

Properties
| Chemical formula | C_{28}H_{24}FNO |
| Molar mass | 409.504 g·mol^{−1} |
- Except where otherwise noted, data are given for materials in their standard state (at 25 °C [77 °F], 100 kPa). (what is ?) Infobox references

EG-2201 (also known as NA-5F-PCZMO using EUDA systematic nomenclature) is a synthetic cannabinoid derived from a carbazole core group. It has been identified as a designer drug and is structurally related to other synthetic cannabinoids, such as EG-018 and MDMB-CHMCZCA. It is primarily used illicitly due to its psychoactive effects, which mimic delta-9-tetrahydrocannabinol (THC), the active ingredient in cannabis.

== Chemical properties ==
EG-2201 comprises a carbazole core group with a 5-fluoropentyl tail group, a methanone linker group, and a napthylenyl linked group. The use of a carbazole core group may increase CB_{2} receptor affinity compared to less bulky core groups like indoles and indazoles.

== Pharmacology ==
EG-2201 acts as an agonist of both human cannabinoid receptors, CB_{1} and CB_{2}, at an affinity of 22.4 ± 12.8 nM and 4.36 ± 2.91 nM, respectively.

== Risks and toxicity ==
Limited toxicity studies exist for EG-2201, but related synthetic cannabinoids are associated with seizures, cardiovascular events, and psychiatric disturbances. Its metabolic byproducts may also be toxic.

== See also ==
- Controlled substances
