= NMP-7 =

Chemical compound

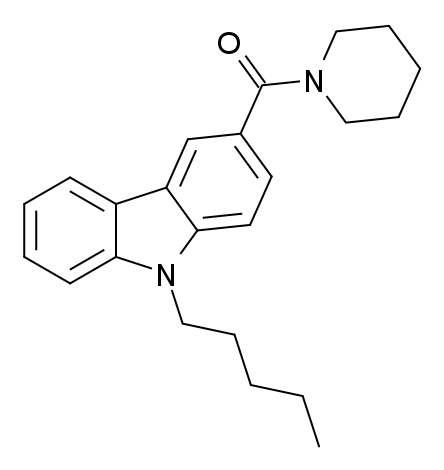

Identifiers
- IUPAC name: (9-pentylcarbazol-3-yl)-piperidin-1-ylmethanone
- CAS Number: 1358039-07-2
- PubChem CID: 46871949
- ChemSpider: 27470961
- UNII: 8G2SU6V9L7
- CompTox Dashboard (EPA): DTXSID901030302

Chemical and physical data
- Formula: C_{23}H_{28}N_{2}O
- Molar mass: 348.490 g·mol^{−1}
- 3D model (JSmol): Interactive image
- SMILES: c3cccc1c3n(CCCCC)c(cc2)c1cc2C(=O)N4CCCCC4
- InChI: InChI=1S/C23H28N2O/c1-2-3-7-16-25-21-11-6-5-10-19(21)20-17-18(12-13-22(20)25)23(26)24-14-8-4-9-15-24/h5-6,10-13,17H,2-4,7-9,14-16H2,1H3; Key:NZEVKZAEMSMLMC-UHFFFAOYSA-N

NMP-7 is a drug which acts as both a non-selective agonist of the CB_{1} and CB_{2} cannabinoid receptors, and also as a blocker of T-type calcium channels, the target of anticonvulsant drugs such as ethosuximide. NMP-7 has an agonist EC_{50} of 96.9nM at CB_{1} and 10.5nM at CB_{2}, and an IC_{50} of 1.84μM for blocking Cav3.2 T-type calcium channels. In animal studies it produces potent analgesic effects in a variety of different tests.

== See also ==
- CUMYL-PEGACLONE
- EG-018
