= BzODZ-EPyr =

Chemical compound

Legal status
- Legal status: CA: Schedule II; DE: NpSG (Industrial and scientific use only); UK: Under Psychoactive Substances Act

Identifiers
- IUPAC name: 3-(3-Benzyl-1,2,4-oxadiazol-5-yl)-1-[2-(pyrrolidin-1-yl)ethyl]-1H-indole
- CAS Number: 422564-85-0
- PubChem CID: 9842447
- ChemSpider: 8018162
- UNII: WSQ49D7D2Q
- ChEMBL: ChEMBL463656
- CompTox Dashboard (EPA): DTXSID301045812

Chemical and physical data
- Formula: C_{23}H_{24}N_{4}O
- Molar mass: 372.472 g·mol^{−1}
- 3D model (JSmol): Interactive image
- SMILES: C(C1=CC=CC=C1)C2=NOC(=N2)C3=C[N](C4=CC=CC=C34)CCN5CCCC5
- InChI: InChI=1S/C23H24N4O/c1-2-8-18(9-3-1)16-22-24-23(28-25-22)20-17-27(15-14-26-12-6-7-13-26)21-11-5-4-10-19(20)21/h1-5,8-11,17H,6-7,12-16H2; Key:RUVOQWMACBDQDK-UHFFFAOYSA-N

BzODZ-EPyr is an indole based synthetic cannabinoid that has been sold as a designer drug in Russia.

It acts as a CB_{1} receptor agonist with a pK_{B} value of 7.2 and demonstrates that replacing the ketone in 3-carbonylindoles with an oxadiazole spacer does not generally lead to activity loss.

== See also ==
- 5F-SDB-006
- AB-PICA
- ADBICA
- APICA
- CUMYL-PICA
- PTI-1
- PTI-2
- SDB-006
