= SCH-5472 =

Stimulant drug

Identifiers
- IUPAC name: 2-benzhydryl-1-methyl-piperidin-3-ol
- CAS Number: 20068-90-0 (phenylsuccinate)
- PubChem CID: 209634
- ChemSpider: 181634
- UNII: 2D4V6AWP8N
- CompTox Dashboard (EPA): DTXSID50942087

Chemical and physical data
- Formula: C_{19}H_{23}NO
- Molar mass: 281.399 g·mol^{−1}
- 3D model (JSmol): Interactive image
- SMILES: OC(CCCN1C)C1C(C2=CC=CC=C2)C3=CC=CC=C3
- InChI: InChI=1S/C19H23NO/c1-20-14-8-13-17(21)19(20)18(15-9-4-2-5-10-15)16-11-6-3-7-12-16/h2-7,9-12,17-19,21H,8,13-14H2,1H3; Key:DQNBDZSLMWHFTB-UHFFFAOYSA-N

SCH-5472. is a stimulant drug developed by Schering-Plough in the 1950s.

== Synthesis ==
Synthesis:

Potassium amide was made from the reaction of potassium metal with liquid ammonia. The coupling between the carbanion created from diphenylmethane [101-81-5] (1) and ethyl 2-furoate [614-99-3] [1335-40-6] (2) gives 2-furyl benzhydryl ketone, CID:63950182 (3). This was reacted with concentrated liquid ammonia in methanol solvent in an autoclave. The product of this step was 2-benzhydrylpyridin-3-ol, CID:125491889 (4). Reduction of the pyridine gave 2-(diphenylmethyl)piperidin-3-ol, CID:209477 (5).

== See also ==
- AL-1095
- Desoxypipradrol
- Difemetorex
