= Cloniprazepam =

Benzodiazepine drug

Clinical data
- Other names: 1-Cyclopropylmethylclonazepam, Kloniprazepam, 2-Chloro-7'-nitroprazepam
- Drug class: Benzodiazepines

Legal status
- Legal status: CA: Schedule IV; DE: NpSG (Industrial and scientific use only); UK: Schedule 1

Identifiers
- IUPAC name: 5-(2-Chlorophenyl)-1-(cyclopropylmethyl)-7-nitro-1,3-dihydro-2H-benzo[e][1,4]diazepin-2-one
- CAS Number: 1998158-84-1
- PubChem CID: 137700140
- ChemSpider: 68003855
- UNII: YSL4SM8QYP
- CompTox Dashboard (EPA): DTXSID60893511

Chemical and physical data
- Formula: C_{19}H_{16}ClN_{3}O_{3}
- Molar mass: 369.81 g·mol^{−1}
- 3D model (JSmol): Interactive image
- SMILES: O=C1N(CC2CC2)C3=CC=C([N+]([O-])=O)C=C3C(C4=CC=CC=C4Cl)=NC1
- InChI: InChI=1S/C19H16ClN3O3/c20-16-4-2-1-3-14(16)19-15-9-13(23(25)26)7-8-17(15)22(11-12-5-6-12)18(24)10-21-19/h1-4,7-9,12H,5-6,10-11H2; Key:CCSYKGYLSFXNTA-UHFFFAOYSA-N

Metabolic pathway of cloniprazepam

Cloniprazepam is a benzodiazepine derivative and a prodrug of clonazepam, 7-aminoclonazepam, and other metabolites.

Some of the minor metabolites include 3-hydroxyclonazepam and 6-hydroxyclonazepam, 3-hydroxycloniprazepam and ketocloniprazepam with ketone group formed where 3-hydroxy group was.

It is a designer drug and an NPS (short for "new psychoactive substance"). At the end of 2017, cloniprazepam was an uncontrolled substance in most of the countries.

== See also ==
- Flutoprazepam
- Ro05-4082
- List of designer drugs
- List of benzodiazepines
- List of benzodiazepine designer drugs
