= Acetildenafil =

Chemical compound

Clinical data
- MedlinePlus: a699015
- Routes of administration: By mouth
- ATC code: None

Legal status
- Legal status: US: Unapproved and unscheduled

Identifiers
- IUPAC name: 5-[2-Ethoxy-5-[2-(4-ethyl-piperazin-1-yl)-acetyl]-phenyl]-1-methyl-3-propyl-1,6-dihydro-pyrazolo[4,3-d]pyrimidin-7-one
- CAS Number: 831217-01-7
- PubChem CID: 29918992
- ChemSpider: 23976138
- UNII: TP0E2BW57H
- ChEBI: CHEBI:183660
- CompTox Dashboard (EPA): DTXSID10232178

Chemical and physical data
- Formula: C_{25}H_{34}N_{6}O_{3}
- Molar mass: 466.586 g·mol^{−1}
- 3D model (JSmol): Interactive image
- SMILES: CCCc1nn(C)c3c1nc([nH]c3=O)-c2cc(ccc2OCC)C(=O)CN4CCN(CC)CC4
- InChI: InChI=1S/C25H34N6O3/c1-5-8-19-22-23(29(4)28-19)25(33)27-24(26-22)18-15-17(9-10-21(18)34-7-3)20(32)16-31-13-11-30(6-2)12-14-31/h9-10,15H,5-8,11-14,16H2,1-4H3,(H,26,27,33); Key:RRBRQNALHKQCAI-UHFFFAOYSA-N

Acetildenafil (hongdenafil) is a synthetic drug which acts as a phosphodiesterase inhibitor. It is an analog of sildenafil (Viagra) which has been detected in numerous different brands of "herbal aphrodisiac" products sold in convenience stores that claim to boost libido and alleviate erectile dysfunction.

A range of designer analogs of licensed PDE_{5} inhibitors such as sildenafil and vardenafil have been detected in recent years in over-the-counter herbal aphrodisiac products, in an apparent attempt to circumvent both the legal restrictions on sale of erectile dysfunction drugs, which are prescription-only medicines in most Western countries, and the patent protection which allows sale of these drugs by competitors only with permission from the patent holders (typically, under a license from the inventors) and to introduce efficacy into otherwise ineffective herbal products. These compounds have been demonstrated to display PDE_{5} inhibitory activity in vitro and presumably have similar effects when consumed, but have undergone no formal testing in either humans or animals, and as such may represent significant health risks to consumers of these products due to their unknown safety profile. Attempts to ban such ingredients have not been successful for the most part, many jurisdictions having laws restricting chemical analogs but only those of narcotics and doping agents. However, at least one court case has resulted in a product being taken off the market.

== See also ==
- Aildenafil
- Nitrosoprodenafil
- Sulfoaildenafil
