= MDPT =

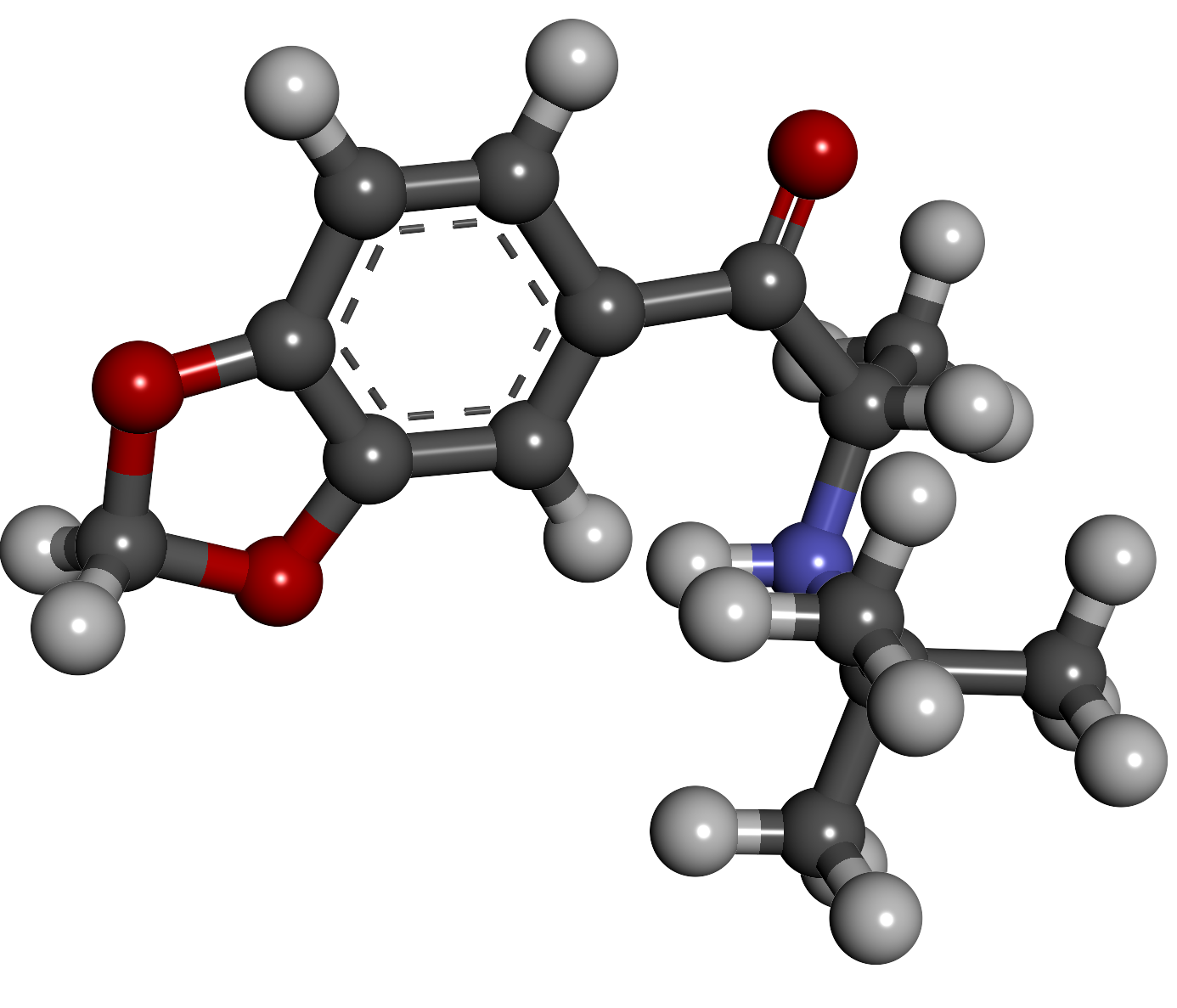

Clinical data
- Other names: Tertylone; tBuONE; MDDCB; MD-tBC; Methylenedioxydeschlorobupropion; 3,4-Methylenedioxy-N-tert-butylcathinone
- Routes of administration: Oral
- Drug class: Stimulant
- ATC code: None

Identifiers
- IUPAC name: 1-(1,3-benzodioxol-5-yl)-2-(tert-butylamino)propan-1-one
- CAS Number: 186028-84-2
- PubChem CID: 85710946
- ChemSpider: 107437104
- UNII: KEU85BE7EF
- CompTox Dashboard (EPA): DTXSID201342679

Chemical and physical data
- Formula: C_{14}H_{19}NO_{3}
- Molar mass: 249.310 g·mol^{−1}
- 3D model (JSmol): Interactive image
- SMILES: CC(C(=O)C1=CC2=C(C=C1)OCO2)NC(C)(C)C
- InChI: InChI=1S/C14H19NO3/c1-9(15-14(2,3)4)13(16)10-5-6-11-12(7-10)18-8-17-11/h5-7,9,15H,8H2,1-4H3; Key:BFOZYEAQPUMNIY-UHFFFAOYSA-N

MDPT, also known as tertylone, tBuONE, or 3,4-methylenedioxy-N-tert-butylcathinone (MD-tBC), among other names, is a stimulant and recreational drug of the phenethylamine, cathinone, and MDxx families. It has been detected as a novel designer drug in the United Kingdom and New Zealand.

== See also ==
- Substituted cathinone
- Substituted methylenedioxyphenethylamine
