= 2-Diphenylmethylpyrrolidine =

Stimulant designer drug

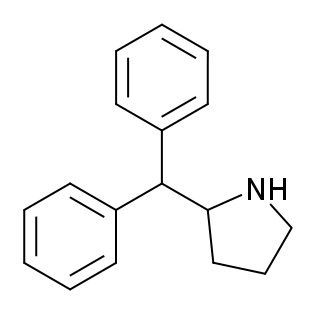

Legal status
- Legal status: DE: NpSG (Industrial and scientific use only); UK: Class B

Identifiers
- IUPAC name: 2-(Diphenylmethyl)pyrrolidine
- CAS Number: 119237-64-8
- PubChem CID: 1295
- ChemSpider: 1256
- UNII: UH7U0MAY6C
- CompTox Dashboard (EPA): DTXSID801308207 DTXSID80922897, DTXSID801308207
- ECHA InfoCard: 100.162.251

Chemical and physical data
- Formula: C_{17}H_{19}N
- Molar mass: 237.346 g·mol^{−1}
- 3D model (JSmol): Interactive image
- SMILES: c1cc(ccc1)C(c2ccccc2)C3NCCC3
- InChI: InChI=1S/C17H19N/c1-3-8-14(9-4-1)17(16-12-7-13-18-16)15-10-5-2-6-11-15/h1-6,8-11,16-18H,7,12-13H2; Key:OXOBKZZXZVFOBB-UHFFFAOYSA-N

2-Diphenylmethylpyrrolidine (Desoxy-D2PM), also known as 2-benzhydrylpyrrolidine, is a stimulant psychoactive drug. It is the 4-dehydroxylated structural analog of diphenylprolinol (D2PM), and is also similar in structure to desoxypipradrol (2-DPMP), both of which act as norepinephrine-dopamine reuptake inhibitors (NDRIs). Like D2PM and 2-DPMP, Desoxy-D2PM is sold as a designer drug and has been used in the manufacture of legal highs. It has been marketed under the names A3A New Generation, A3A Methano, and Green Powder, and has been reported to cause hallucinations, violent behavior, dilated pupils, tachycardia, and high blood pressure. Literature data suggest that it can produce the same psychotropic effects as other stimulants, but with a longer duration of action.

Desoxy-D2PM has two enantiomers which are used industrially in their purified form as chiral derivatizing agents during chemical synthesis.

As of 4 November 2010, the UK Home Office announced a ban on the importation of 2-diphenylmethylpyrrolidine, following a recommendation from the ACMD. It was due to become a class B drug on 28 March 2012, but the bill was scrapped, due to the presence of two steroids included in the bill that were later recommended to remain uncontrolled.

It was made a class B drug and placed in Schedule I on 13 June 2012.
