= Diphenylalanine =

- Diphenylalanine

Names
- Preferred IUPAC name 2-Amino-3,3-diphenylpropanoic acid

Identifiers
CAS Number	(L-isomer): 149597-92-2; (D-isomer): 149597-91-1
3D model (JSmol)	Interactive image
ChemSpider	(L-isomer): 143073
ECHA InfoCard	100.153.616
PubChem CID	(L-isomer): 162977; (D-isomer): 1520861
UNII	(L-isomer): L1ZWG54X8B; (D-isomer): H2JAP020MP
CompTox Dashboard (EPA)	DTXSID80933685
- InChI: InChI=1S/C15H15NO2/c1-12(15(17)18)16(13-8-4-2-5-9-13)14-10-6-3-7-11-14/h2-12H,1H3,(H,17,18) Key: SAUDSWFPPKSVMK-UHFFFAOYSA-N
- SMILES: OC(C(N)C(C2=CC=CC=C2)C1=CC=CC=C1)=O

Properties
Chemical formula	C_{15}H_{15}NO_{2}
Molar mass	241.11 g/mol
Appearance	Solid
Melting point	235 °C (455 °F; 508 K)

Related compounds
Related amino acids	Alanine
- Except where otherwise noted, data are given for materials in their standard state (at 25 °C [77 °F], 100 kPa). verify (what is ?) Infobox references

Diphenylalanine is the unnatural amino acid with the formula (C_{6}H_{5})_{2}CHCH(NH_{2})CO_{2}H. The compound is structurally related to the amino acids alanine and phenylalanine. It has been used for the synthesis of pseudopeptide analogues that are capable of inhibiting certain enzymes.

Individual enantiomers of this compound can be synthesized via electrophilic amination of a chiral oxazolidinone derivative of 3,3-diphenylpropanoic acid.

The term diphenylalanine in the context of scientific literature is typically used for the dipeptide of phenylalanine (Phe-Phe).
