= N-Methylclonazepam =

Chemical compound

Legal status
- Legal status: CA: Schedule IV; DE: NpSG (Industrial and scientific use only); UK: Under Psychoactive Substances Act

Identifiers
- IUPAC name: 5-(2-chlorophenyl)-1-methyl-7-nitro-3H-1,4-benzodiazepin-2-one
- CAS Number: 5527-71-9
- PubChem CID: 528222
- UNII: 89WG8CN9AJ
- CompTox Dashboard (EPA): DTXSID60203777

Chemical and physical data
- Formula: C_{16}H_{12}ClN_{3}O_{3}
- Molar mass: 329.74 g·mol^{−1}
- 3D model (JSmol): Interactive image
- SMILES: CN1C(=O)CN=C(C2=C1C=CC(=C2)[N+](=O)[O-])C3=CC=CC=C3Cl
- InChI: InChI=1S/C16H12ClN3O3/c1-19-14-7-6-10(20(22)23)8-12(14)16(18-9-15(19)21)11-4-2-3-5-13(11)17/h2-8H,9H2,1H3; Key:AZVBJJDUDXZLTM-UHFFFAOYSA-N

N-Methylclonazepam (also known as Ro05-4082, ID-690 and methylclonazepam) is a benzodiazepine derivative developed in the 1970s. It has sedative and hypnotic properties, and has around the same potency as clonazepam itself. It was never introduced into clinical use. It is a structural isomer of meclonazepam (3-methylclonazepam), and similarly has been sold as a designer drug, first being identified in Sweden in 2017.

In July 2025, N-methylclonazepam was identified alongside fentanyl as a component in a batch of drugs linked to a mass overdose in Baltimore, Maryland. There were at least 27 hospitalisations, and many patients remained unconscious even after administration of naloxone; a NIST research chemist said this may have been due to the sedative effects of the methylclonazepam.

== See also ==
- Cloniprazepam
- Flunitrazepam
