= Β-Phenylmethamphetamine =

Stimulant drug

β-Phenylmethamphetamine
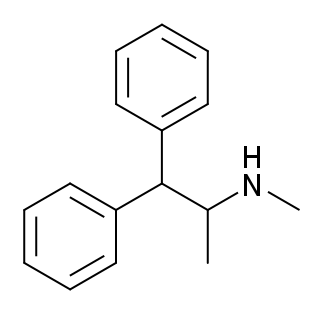

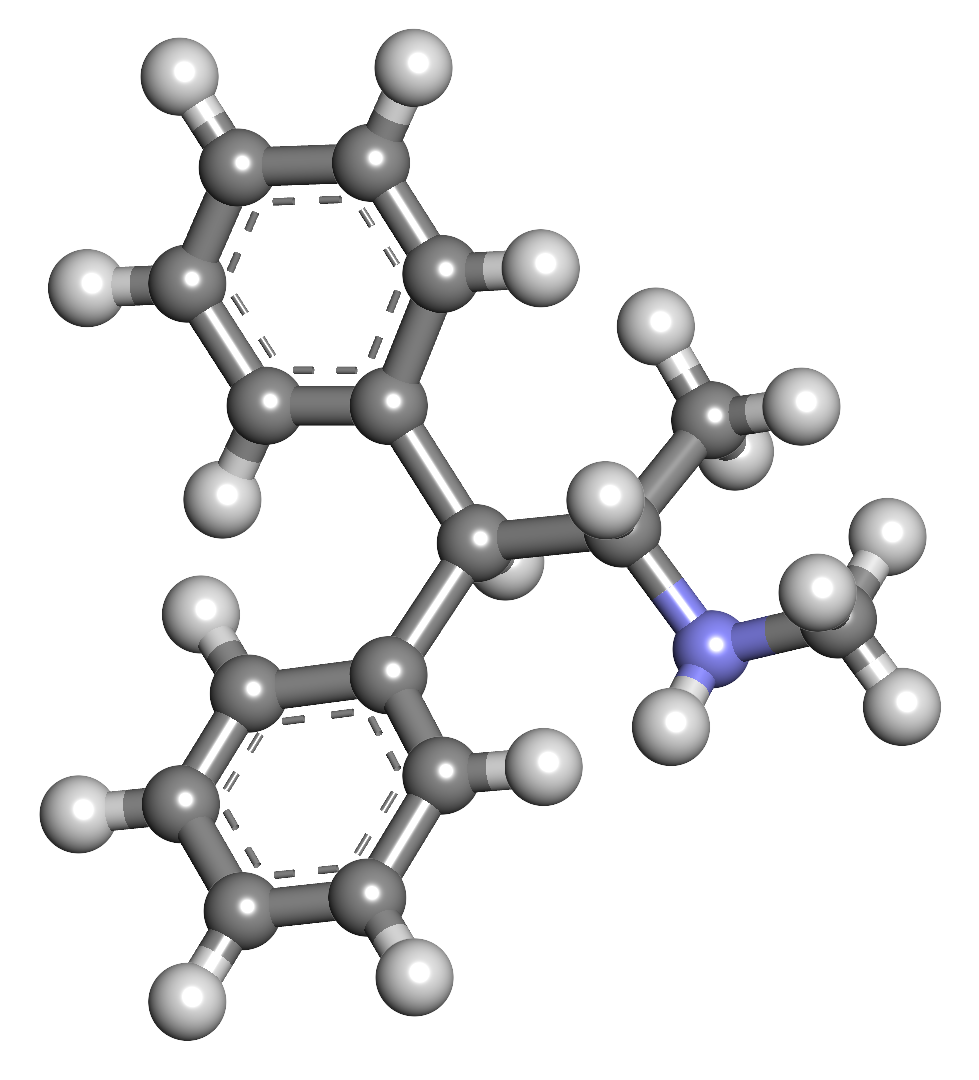

Clinical data
- ATC code: none

Legal status
- Legal status: DE: NpSG (Industrial and scientific use only); UK: Class A

Identifiers
- IUPAC name: 1,1-diphenyl-2-methylaminopropane
- CAS Number: 768295-94-9 3139-56-8 (hydrochloride)
- PubChem CID: 201042
- ChemSpider: 174060
- UNII: 13B0I1EGF7
- CompTox Dashboard (EPA): DTXSID70276795

Chemical and physical data
- Formula: C_{16}H_{19}N
- Molar mass: 225.335 g·mol^{−1}
- 3D model (JSmol): Interactive image
- SMILES: c2ccccc2C(C(C)NC)c1ccccc1
- InChI: InChI=1S/C16H19N/c1-13(17-2)16(14-9-5-3-6-10-14)15-11-7-4-8-12-15/h3-13,16-17H,1-2H3; Key:YZFPOMOQFPMBPK-UHFFFAOYSA-N

β-Phenylmethamphetamine (N,α-dimethyl-β-phenyl-phenethylamine) is a potent and long lasting stimulant drug.

== Synthesis ==
β-Phenylmethamphetamine can be synthesised by reductive amination of 1,1-diphenylacetone and methylamine.

Synthesis of 1,1-diphenylacetone been described. It can also be used in the synthesis of diphenadione.

== See also ==
- 3-Benzhydrylmorpholine
- 3,3-Diphenylcyclobutanamine
- Desoxypipradrol
