= Nitrosoprodenafil =

Chemical compound

Clinical data
- Routes of administration: oral
- ATC code: None

Identifiers
- IUPAC name: 2-[(5-[5-(3,5-Dimethylpiperazine-1-sulfonyl)-2-ethoxyphenyl]-1-methyl-3-propyl-1H-pyrazolo[4,3-d]pyrimidin-7-yl)oxy]-N-methyl-N-nitroso-1,3-thiazol-5-amine
- CAS Number: 1266755-08-1
- PubChem CID: 71308247
- ChemSpider: 32701496
- UNII: X8TO9P16G7
- CompTox Dashboard (EPA): DTXSID301029943

Chemical and physical data
- Formula: C_{28}H_{38}N_{8}O_{5}S_{2}
- Molar mass: 630.78 g·mol^{−1}
- 3D model (JSmol): Interactive image
- SMILES: CCCc1c2c(c(nc(n2)c3cc(ccc3OCC)S(=O)(=O)N4C[C@H](N[C@H](C4)C)C)Oc5ncc(s5)N(C)N=O)n(n1)C
- InChI: InChI=1S/C27H35N9O5S2/c1-7-9-20-23-24(35(6)32-20)26(41-27-28-13-22(42-27)34(5)33-37)31-25(30-23)19-12-18(10-11-21(19)40-8-2)43(38,39)36-14-16(3)29-17(4)15-36/h10-13,16-17,29H,7-9,14-15H2,1-6H3/t16-,17+; Key:DTAKXJYYAUWRND-CALCHBBNSA-N

Nitrosoprodenafil is a synthetic designer drug found in "herbal" aphrodisiac products, which is a novel nitrosated analogue of sildenafil (Viagra). It has an innovative structure which acts as a prodrug, breaking down in the body to release both the PDE_{5} inhibitor aildenafil as well as free nitric oxide, which have powerfully synergistic effects. This dual mechanism of action has never been exploited by conventional pharmaceutical companies because of the risks involved; usually combining PDE_{5} inhibitors with nitric oxide releasers like amyl nitrite is contraindicated as it can cause a precipitous drop in blood pressure that can potentially result in death. Nitrosamines are also generally avoided in drug development as they can often be hepatotoxic and carcinogenic, so while the combined mechanisms of action are likely to be effective, this drug also has severe risks of toxicity.

Shortly after Venhuis et al. published the suggested structure for nitrosoprodenafil, it was contested by Demizu et al. who suggested the structure was an azathioprine/aildenafil hybrid. This newly suggested structure was dubbed 'mutaprodenafil' because of the structural similarity with the mutagenic immunosuppressive drug azathioprine.

The final confirmation of the azathioprine/aildenafil hybrid was provided by Sakamoto et al. who prepared crystals for X-ray analysis. Although Sakamoto et al. support the name 'mutaprodenafil', they prefer to use 'nitrosoprodenafil' instead.

== See also ==
- Acetildenafil
- Sulfoaildenafil
- Naproxcinod
- Designer drug
