= Isobutyrylfentanyl =

Opioid analgesic

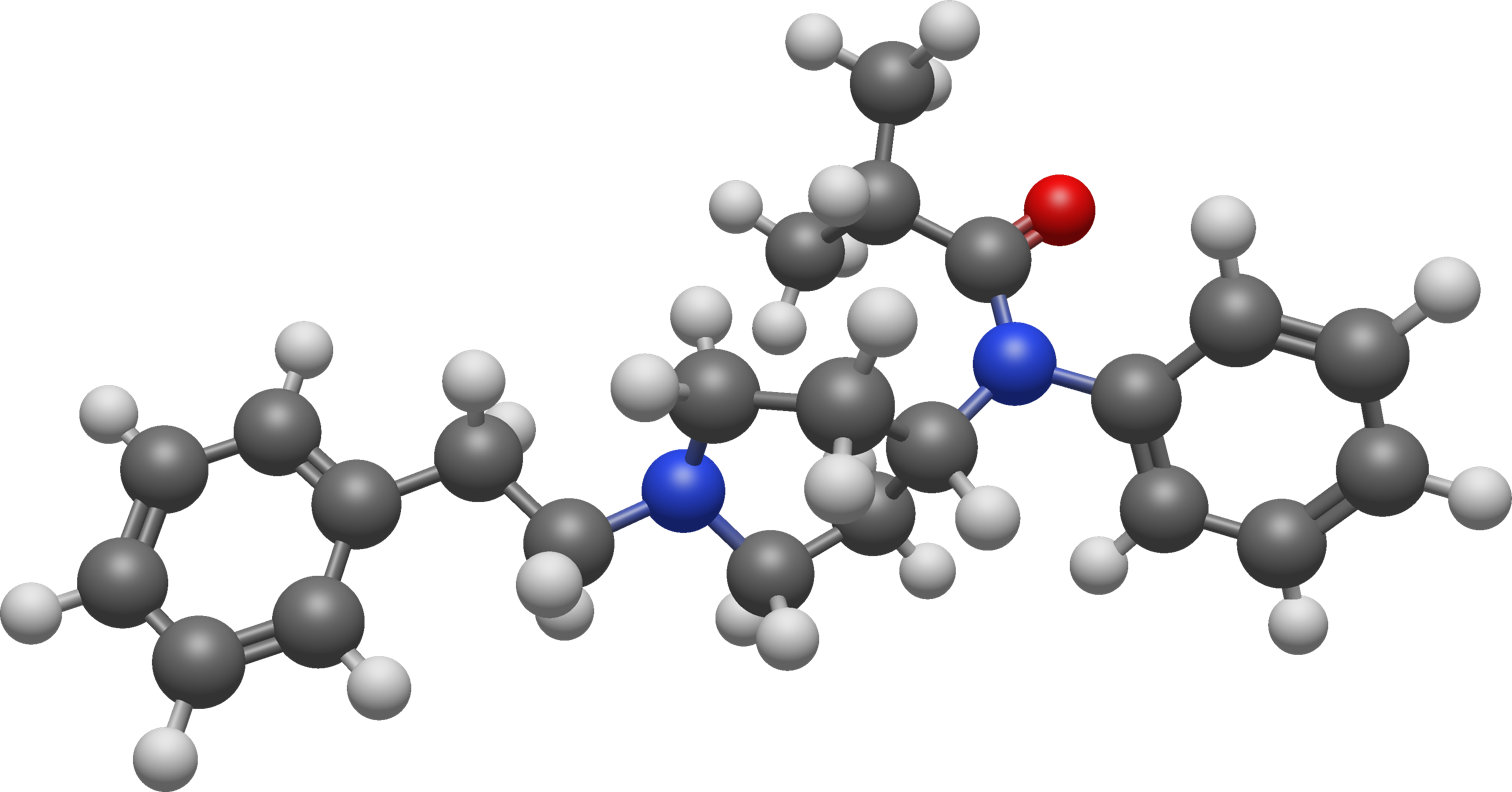

Legal status
- Legal status: CA: Schedule I; DE: NpSG (Industrial and scientific use only); UK: Class A; US: Schedule I

Identifiers
- IUPAC name: 2-methyl-N-phenyl-N-[1-(1-phenylpropan-2-yl)piperidin-4-yl]propanamide
- CAS Number: 119618-70-1
- PubChem CID: 14402357
- ChemSpider: 10551382
- UNII: LF0F3A39RV

Chemical and physical data
- Formula: C_{23}H_{30}N_{2}O
- Molar mass: 350.506 g·mol^{−1}
- 3D model (JSmol): Interactive image
- SMILES: CC(C)C(=O)N(C1CCN(CC1)CCC2=CC=CC=C2)C3=CC=CC=C3
- InChI: InChI=1S/C23H30N2O/c1-19(2)23(26)25(21-11-7-4-8-12-21)22-14-17-24(18-15-22)16-13-20-9-5-3-6-10-20/h3-12,19,22H,13-18H2,1-2H3; Key:WRPFPNIHTOSMKU-UHFFFAOYSA-N

Isobutyrylfentanyl is an opioid analgesic that is an analog of fentanyl and has been sold online as a designer drug. It is believed to be around the same potency as butyrfentanyl but has been less widely distributed on illicit markets, though it was one of the earliest of the "new wave" of fentanyl derivatives to appear, and was reported in Europe for the first time in December 2012.

== Side effects ==
Side effects of fentanyl analogs are similar to those of fentanyl itself, which include itching, nausea and potentially serious respiratory depression, which can be life-threatening. Fentanyl analogs have killed hundreds of people throughout Europe and the former Soviet republics since the most recent resurgence in use began in Estonia in the early 2000s, and novel derivatives continue to appear. A new wave of fentanyl analogues and associated deaths began in around 2014 in the US, and have continued to grow in prevalence; especially since 2016 these drugs have been responsible for hundreds of overdose deaths every week.

== Legal status ==
Isobutyrylfentanyl is a Schedule I controlled drug in the USA since 1 February 2018.

== See also ==
- Acetylfentanyl
- Butyrfentanyl
- Cyclopropylfentanyl
- Furanylfentanyl
- List of fentanyl analogues
