= Sulfoaildenafil =

Chemical compound

Clinical data
- Other names: Thiomethisosildenafil; Sildenafil thione; Thioaildenafil

Legal status
- Legal status: Unapproved and unscheduled

Identifiers
- IUPAC name: 5-[5-[(3S,5R)-3,5-dimethylpiperazin-1-yl]sulfonyl-2-ethoxyphenyl]-1-methyl-3-propyl-4H-pyrazolo[4,3-d]pyrimidine-7-thione
- CAS Number: 856190-47-1
- PubChem CID: 56841591
- ChemSpider: 24751855
- UNII: 33DX49E09G
- CompTox Dashboard (EPA): DTXSID20234860

Chemical and physical data
- Formula: C_{23}H_{32}N_{6}O_{3}S_{2}
- Molar mass: 504.67 g·mol^{−1}
- 3D model (JSmol): Interactive image
- SMILES: CCCC1=NN(C2=C1NC(=NC2=S)C3=C(C=CC(=C3)S(=O)(=O)N4C[C@H](N[C@H](C4)C)C)OCC)C
- InChI: InChI=1S/C23H32N6O3S2/c1-6-8-18-20-21(28(5)27-18)23(33)26-22(25-20)17-11-16(9-10-19(17)32-7-2)34(30,31)29-12-14(3)24-15(4)13-29/h9-11,14-15,24H,6-8,12-13H2,1-5H3,(H,25,26,33)/t14-,15+; Key:SCLUKEPFXXPARW-GASCZTMLSA-N

Sulfoaildenafil (thioaildenafil) is a synthetic drug that is a structural analog of sildenafil (Viagra). It was first reported in 2005, and it is not approved by any health regulation agency. Like sildenafil, sulfoaildenafil is a phosphodiesterase type 5 inhibitor.

Sulfoaildenafil has been found as an adulterant in a variety of supplements which are sold as "natural" or "herbal" sexual enhancement products. A range of designer analogues of USA FDA-approved inhibitors of type-5 cGMP-specific phosphodiesterase (PDE_{5}), such as sildenafil and vardenafil, have been detected in recent years as adulterants in over-the-counter herbal aphrodisiac products and dietary supplements, in an apparent attempt to circumvent both the legal restrictions on sale of erectile dysfunction drugs, which are prescription-only medicines in most Western countries, and the patent protection which prevents sale of these drugs by competitors except under license to their inventors. These compounds have been demonstrated to display PDE_{5} inhibitory activity in vitro and presumably have similar effects when consumed, but have undergone no formal testing in either humans or animals, and as such represent a significant health risk to consumers of these products due to their unknown safety profile. Some attempts have been made to ban these drugs as unlicensed medicines, but progress has been slow so far, as even in those jurisdictions which have laws targeting designer drugs, the laws are drafted to ban analogues of illegal drugs of abuse, rather than analogues of prescription medicines. However, at least one court case has resulted in a product being taken off the market.

In December 2010, the United States Food and Drug Administration (FDA) issued a warning to consumers about such products stating, "The FDA has found many products marketed as dietary supplements for sexual enhancement during the past several years that can be harmful because they contain active ingredients in FDA-approved drugs or variations of these ingredients."

== See also ==
- Aildenafil
- Acetildenafil
- Nitrosoprodenafil
