= Norepinephrine–dopamine reuptake inhibitor =

Drug that inhibits the reuptake of norepinephrine and dopamine

- Drug class
- Methylphenidate, one of the most widely used NDRIs.

Class identifiers
- Use: ADHD, depression, narcolepsy
- Mechanism of action: reuptake inhibitor
- Biological target: norepinephrine transporter (NET), dopamine transporter (DAT)

Legal status

A norepinephrine–dopamine reuptake inhibitor (NDRI) is a type of drug that inhibits the reuptake of the monoamine neurotransmitters norepinephrine and dopamine and thereby increases extracellular levels of these neurotransmitters and noradrenergic and dopaminergic neurotransmission. They work by competitively and/or noncompetitively inhibiting the norepinephrine transporter (NET) and dopamine transporter (DAT).

NDRIs are used clinically in the treatment of conditions including attention deficit hyperactivity disorder (ADHD), narcolepsy, and depression. Examples of well-known NDRIs include methylphenidate and bupropion.

A closely related type of drug is a norepinephrine–dopamine releasing agent (NDRA).

== List of NDRIs ==
Many NDRIs exist, including the following:

- Amineptine (Survector, Maneon, Directim)
- Bupropion (Wellbutrin, Zyban)
- Desoxypipradrol (2-DPMP)
- Dexmethylphenidate (Focalin)
- Difemetorex (Cleofil)
- Diphenylprolinol (D2PM)
- Ethylphenidate
- Fencamfamine (Glucoenergan, Reactivan)
- Fencamine (Altimina, Sicoclor)
- Lefetamine (Santenol)
- Methylenedioxypyrovalerone (MDPV)
- Methylphenidate (Ritalin, Concerta, Metadate, Methylin, Foquest, Medikinet)
- Nomifensine (Merital)
- O-2172
- Phenylpiracetam (Phenotropil, Carphedon)
- Pipradrol (Meretran)
- Prolintane (Promotil, Katovit)
- Pyrovalerone (Centroton, Thymergix)
- Solriamfetol (Sunosi)
- Tametraline (CP-24,411)
- WY-46824

Some NDRIs, such as methylphenidate, may not act as simple NDRIs but rather as DAT "inverse agonists" (and possibly also analogously at the NET as well). If this theory is correct, then methylphenidate and other agents like cocaine may not be acting primarily as monoamine reuptake inhibitors but instead as robust monoamine releasing agent-esque drugs, albeit via a different mechanism of action than conventional substrate-type monoamine releasing agents.

Norepinephrine–dopamine releasing agents (NDRAs) like amphetamine and methamphetamine not only induce monoamine release but also act as monoamine reuptake inhibitors to a lesser extent and hence are additionally NDRIs.

== See also ==
- Monoamine reuptake inhibitor
- Dopamine reuptake inhibitor
- Norepinephrine reuptake inhibitor
- Serotonin–norepinephrine–dopamine reuptake inhibitor
