= Valerylfentanyl =

Opioid analgesic

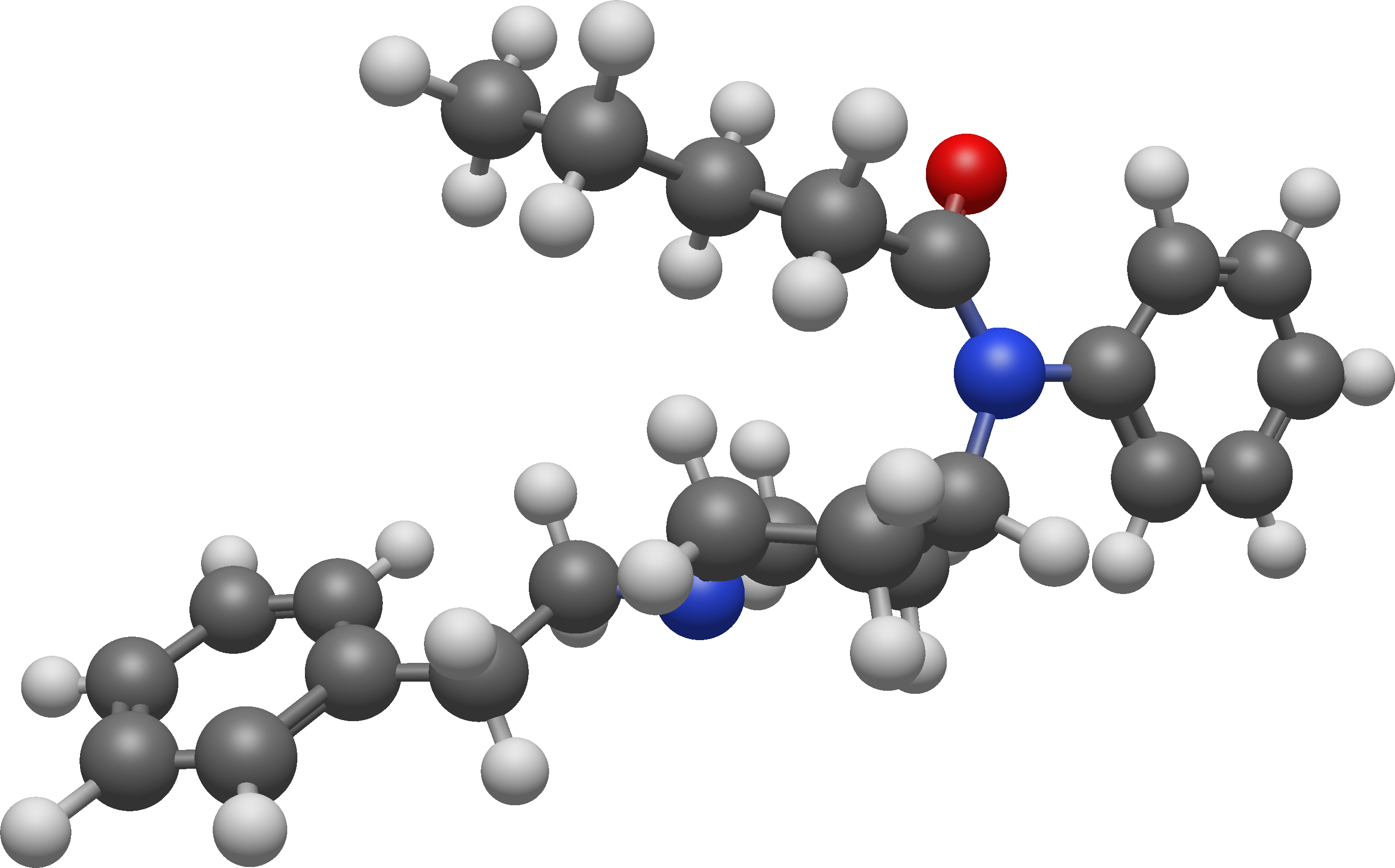

Legal status
- Legal status: BR: Class F1 (Prohibited narcotics); CA: Schedule I; DE: Anlage II (Authorized trade only, not prescriptible); UK: Class A; US: Schedule I; UN: Narcotic Schedule I

Identifiers
- IUPAC name: N-(1-(2-Phenylethyl)-4-piperidinyl)-N-phenylpentylamide
- CAS Number: 122882-90-0
- PubChem CID: 21595398
- ChemSpider: 10551383
- UNII: VUG0EQK700
- KEGG: C22762
- CompTox Dashboard (EPA): DTXSID801014173

Chemical and physical data
- Formula: C_{24}H_{32}N_{2}O
- Molar mass: 364.533 g·mol^{−1}
- 3D model (JSmol): Interactive image
- SMILES: CCCCC(=O)N(C1CCN(CC1)CCC2=CC=CC=C2)C3=CC=CC=C3
- InChI: InChI=1S/C24H32N2O/c1-2-3-14-24(27)26(22-12-8-5-9-13-22)23-16-19-25(20-17-23)18-15-21-10-6-4-7-11-21/h4-13,23H,2-3,14-20H2,1H3; Key:VCCPXHWAJYWQMR-UHFFFAOYSA-N

Valerylfentanyl is an opioid analgesic that is an analog of fentanyl and has been sold online as a designer drug. It has been seldom reported on illicit markets and there is little information about it, though it is believed to be less potent than butyrfentanyl but more potent than benzylfentanyl. In one study, it fully substituted for oxycodone and produced antinociception and oxycodone-like discriminative stimulus effects comparable in potency to morphine in mice, but failed to stimulate locomotor activity in mice at doses up to 100 mg/kg.

== Side effects ==
Side effects of fentanyl analogs are similar to those of fentanyl itself, which include itching, nausea and potentially serious respiratory depression, which can be life-threatening. Fentanyl analogs have killed hundreds of people throughout Europe and the former Soviet republics since the most recent resurgence in use began in Estonia in the early 2000s, and novel derivatives continue to appear. A new wave of fentanyl analogues and associated deaths began in around 2014 in the US, and have continued to grow in prevalence; especially since 2016 these drugs have been responsible for hundreds of overdose deaths every week.

== Legal status ==
Valerylfentanyl is a Schedule I controlled drug in the USA since 1 February 2018.

In December of 2019, the UNODC announced scheduling recommendations placing valerylfentanyl into Schedule I.

== See also ==
- Acetylfentanyl
- Butyrfentanyl
- Crotonylfentanyl
- Furanylfentanyl
- List of fentanyl analogues
