= EG-018 =

Chemical compound

Legal status
- Legal status: CA: Schedule II; DE: NpSG (Industrial and scientific use only); UK: Under Psychoactive Substances Act; Illegal in Japan

Identifiers
- IUPAC name: Naphthalen-1-yl-(9-pentylcarbazol-3-yl)methanone
- CAS Number: 2219320-91-7
- PubChem CID: 118796466
- ChemSpider: 30922490
- UNII: 5G2788GL5G
- CompTox Dashboard (EPA): DTXSID001337258

Chemical and physical data
- Formula: C_{28}H_{25}NO
- Molar mass: 391.514 g·mol^{−1}
- 3D model (JSmol): Interactive image
- SMILES: CCCCCN1C2=C(C=C(C=C2)C(=O)C3=CC=CC4=CC=CC=C43)C5=CC=CC=C51
- InChI: InChI=1S/C28H25NO/c1-2-3-8-18-29-26-15-7-6-13-23(26)25-19-21(16-17-27(25)29)28(30)24-14-9-11-20-10-4-5-12-22(20)24/h4-7,9-17,19H,2-3,8,18H2,1H3; Key:FJMMDJDPNLZYLA-UHFFFAOYSA-N

EG-018 is a carbazole-based synthetic cannabinoid that has been sold online as a designer drug. It acts as a partial agonist of the CB_{1} and CB_{2} receptor, with reasonably high binding affinity, but low efficacy in terms of inducing a signaling response.

== Legal status ==
EG-018 is a controlled substance in Japan.

== See also ==
- BIM-018
- CHM-018
- JWH-018
- THJ-018
- FUB-018
- NMP-7
