= Butyltolylquinuclidine =

Stimulant drug

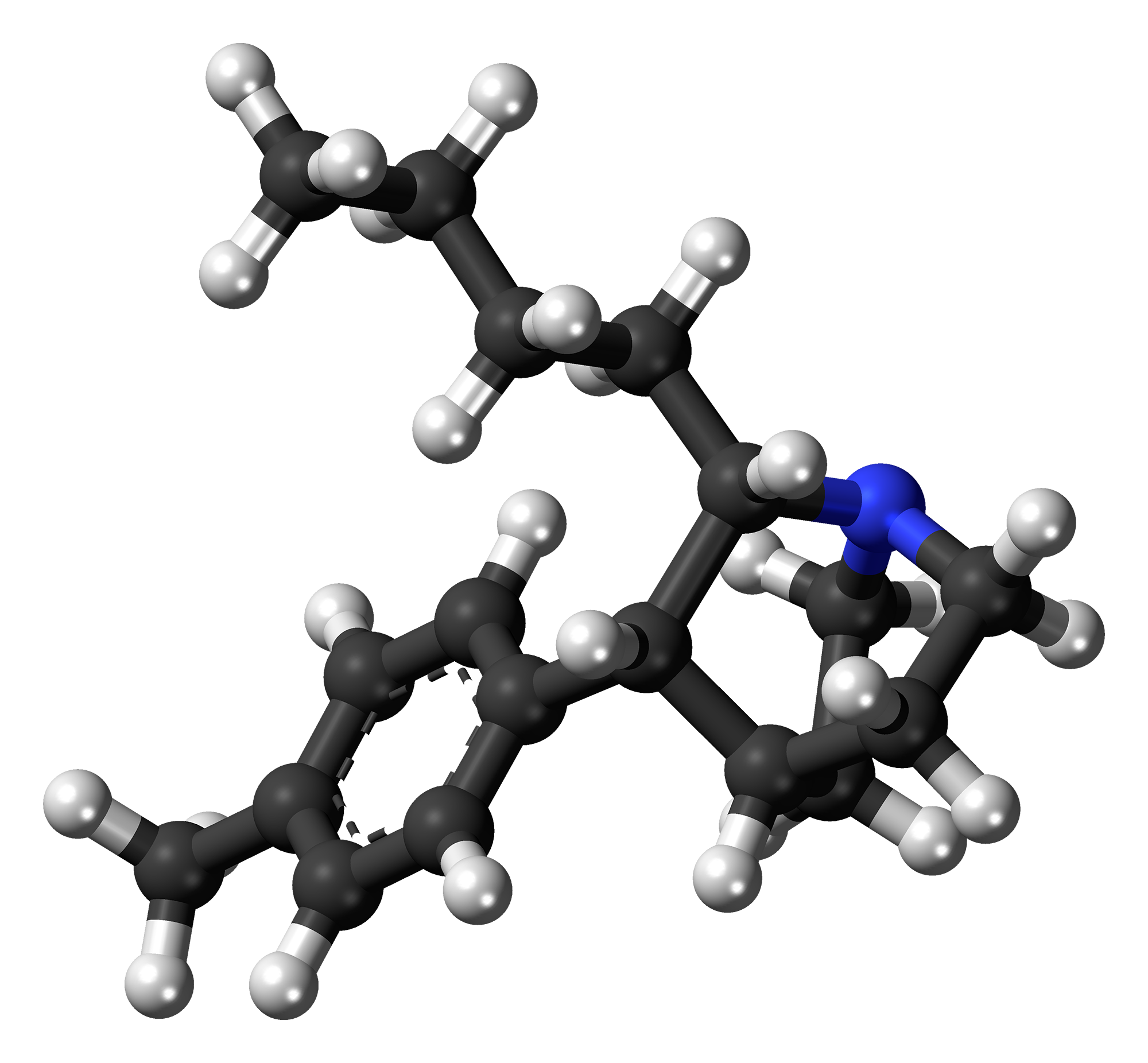

Clinical data
- ATC code: none

Legal status
- Legal status: In general: legal

Identifiers
- IUPAC name: (2R,3S,4S)-2-butyl-3-p-tolylquinuclidine
- CAS Number: 328047-48-9
- PubChem CID: 9903250
- ChemSpider: 8013735
- UNII: J5W6BTT4ZQ

Chemical and physical data
- Formula: C_{18}H_{27}N
- Molar mass: 257.421 g·mol^{−1}
- 3D model (JSmol): Interactive image
- SMILES: C3CC1CCN3C(CCCC)C1c(cc2)ccc2C
- InChI: InChI=1S/C18H27N/c1-3-4-5-17-18(15-8-6-14(2)7-9-15)16-10-12-19(17)13-11-16/h6-9,16-18H,3-5,10-13H2,1-2H3; Key:QYIZEJQSBLRXJK-UHFFFAOYSA-N

2-Butyl-3-(p-tolyl)quinuclidine (BTQ) is a stimulant dopamine reuptake inhibitor (DRI). It is one of a number of substituted quinuclidine derivatives developed as potential medications for the treatment of cocaine abuse, and produces similar effects to cocaine in animal studies, although milder and longer-lasting.

== See also ==
- AL-1095
