= Aildenafil =

Chemical compound

Clinical data
- Other names: Methisosildenafil; Dimethyl sildenafil

Legal status
- Legal status: In general, unapproved and unscheduled; Rx in China

Identifiers
- IUPAC name: 5-[5-[(3S,5R)-3,5-dimethylpiperazin-1-yl]sulfonyl-2-ethoxyphenyl]-1-methyl-3-propyl-6H-pyrazolo[4,3-d]pyrimidin-7-one
- CAS Number: 496835-35-9
- PubChem CID: 135452876
- ChemSpider: 8316620
- UNII: 9T49W8GAX6
- CompTox Dashboard (EPA): DTXSID10197970

Chemical and physical data
- Formula: C_{23}H_{32}N_{6}O_{4}S
- Molar mass: 488.61 g·mol^{−1}
- 3D model (JSmol): Interactive image
- SMILES: CCCC1=NN(C2=C1N=C(NC2=O)C3=C(C=CC(=C3)S(=O)(=O)N4C[C@H](N[C@H](C4)C)C)OCC)C
- InChI: InChI=1S/C23H32N6O4S/c1-6-8-18-20-21(28(5)27-18)23(30)26-22(25-20)17-11-16(9-10-19(17)33-7-2)34(31,32)29-12-14(3)24-15(4)13-29/h9-11,14-15,24H,6-8,12-13H2,1-5H3,(H,25,26,30)/t14-,15+; Key:NFSWSZIPXJAYLR-GASCZTMLSA-N

Aildenafil (methisosildenafil) is a synthetic drug that is a structural analog of sildenafil (Viagra). It was first reported in 2003. Like sildenafil, aildenafil is a phosphodiesterase type 5 inhibitor.

Aildenafil has been found as an adulterant in a variety of supplements which are sold as "natural" or "herbal" sexual enhancement products. The United States Food and Drug Administration has warned consumers that any sexual enhancement product that claims to work as well as prescription products is likely to contain such a contaminant.

Aildenafil is approved for use in China.

== See also ==
- List of investigational sexual dysfunction drugs
- Acetildenafil
- Nitrosoprodenafil
- Sulfoaildenafil
