= 3-(4-Hydroxymethylbenzoyl)-1-pentylindole =

Names
- Preferred IUPAC name [4-(Hydroxymethyl)phenyl](1-pentyl-1H-indol-3-yl)methanone

Identifiers
CAS Number	1391485-19-0
3D model (JSmol)	Interactive image
ChemSpider	52084877
PubChem CID	117587639
UNII	W64GU7350V
CompTox Dashboard (EPA)	DTXSID701183123
- InChI: InChI=1S/C21H23NO2/c1-2-3-6-13-22-14-19(18-7-4-5-8-20(18)22)21(24)17-11-9-16(15-23)10-12-17/h4-5,7-12,14,23H,2-3,6,13,15H2,1H3 Key: KAXVGIUZJKXDPE-UHFFFAOYSA-N
- SMILES: CCCCCN1C=C(C2=CC=CC=C21)C(=O)C3=CC=C(C=C3)CO

Properties
Chemical formula	C_{21}H_{23}NO_{2}
Molar mass	321.420 g·mol^{−1}
- Except where otherwise noted, data are given for materials in their standard state (at 25 °C [77 °F], 100 kPa). Infobox references

3-(4-Hydroxymethylbenzoyl)-1-pentylindole is a synthetic cannabinoid. It is planned to be scheduled (in group I-N) in Poland. It has been reported to the EMCDDA and Europol for the first time in 2010 under the terms of European Council Decision 2005/387/JHA of 10 May 2005 on the information exchange, risk-assessment and control of new psychoactive substances.

== See also ==
- Synthetic cannabis
