= Desoxypipradrol =

Chemical compound

Clinical data
- Routes of administration: By mouth, nasal and sublingual
- ATC code: none

Legal status
- Legal status: DE: Anlage II (Authorized trade only, not prescriptible); UK: Class B

Pharmacokinetic data
- Bioavailability: >90%
- Metabolism: Liver
- Elimination half-life: 16–20 hours

Identifiers
- IUPAC name: (RS)-2-benzhydrylpiperidine
- CAS Number: 519-74-4 5807-81-8 (HCl)
- PubChem CID: 160506
- ChemSpider: 141045
- UNII: 49UNK1BV8T
- CompTox Dashboard (EPA): DTXSID90897502
- ECHA InfoCard: 100.007.525

Chemical and physical data
- Formula: C_{18}H_{21}N
- Molar mass: 251.373 g·mol^{−1}
- 3D model (JSmol): Interactive image
- Chirality: Racemic mixture
- SMILES: C1(C(C2NCCCC2)C3=CC=CC=C3)=CC=CC=C1
- InChI: InChI=1S/C18H21N/c1-3-9-15(10-4-1)18(16-11-5-2-6-12-16)17-13-7-8-14-19-17/h1-6,9-12,17-19H,7-8,13-14H2; Key:RWTNXJXZVGHMGI-UHFFFAOYSA-N

Desoxypipradrol, also known as 2-diphenylmethylpiperidine (2-DPMP), is a drug developed by Ciba in the 1950s which acts as a norepinephrine-dopamine reuptake inhibitor (NDRI).

== Chemistry ==
Desoxypipradrol is closely related on a structural level to the compounds methylphenidate and pipradrol, all three of which share a similar pharmacological action. Of these three piperidines, desoxypipradrol has the longest elimination half-life, as it is a highly lipophilic molecule lacking polar functional groups that are typically targeted by metabolic enzymes, giving it an extremely long duration of action when compared to most psychostimulants. Methylphenidate, on the other hand, is a short-acting compound, as it possesses a methyl-ester moiety that is easily cleaved, forming a highly polar acid group, while pipradrol (desoxypipradrol's intermediate) has shorter duration due to a hydroxyl group which can be conjugated (e.g. with glucuronide) to increase its hydrophilicity and facilitate excretion, but pipradrol itself has no easily metabolizable groups.

== History ==
Desoxypipradrol was developed by the pharmaceutical company CIBA (now called Novartis) in the 1950s, and researched for applications such as the treatment of narcolepsy and ADHD; however, it was dropped from development after the related drug methylphenidate was developed by the same company. Methylphenidate was felt to be the superior drug for treating ADHD due to its shorter duration of action and more predictable pharmacokinetics, and while desoxypipradrol was researched for other applications (such as facilitation of rapid recovery from anaesthesia), its development was not continued. The hydroxylated derivative pipradrol was, however, introduced as a clinical drug indicated for depression, narcolepsy and cognitive enhancement in organic dementia.

== Detection in biological specimens ==
Desoxypipradrol may be quantitated in blood, plasma or urine by liquid chromatography-mass spectrometry to confirm a diagnosis of poisoning in hospitalized patients or to provide evidence in a medicolegal death investigation. Blood or plasma desoxypipradrol concentrations are expected to be in a range of 10–50 μg/L in persons using the drug recreationally, >100 μg/L in intoxicated patients and >600 μg/L in victims of acute overdosage.

== Legal status ==
Desoxypipradrol's structural similarity to pipradrol makes it possible that it would be considered a controlled substance analogue in several countries such as Australia and New Zealand.

=== China ===
As of October 2015 2-DPMP is a controlled substance in China.

=== United Kingdom ===
As of 4 November 2010, the UK Home Office announced a ban on the importation of 2-DPMP, following a recommendation from the ACMD.

Prior to the import ban, desoxypipradrol was sold as a 'legal high' in several products, most notably "Ivory wave". Its use lead to several Emergency Department visits which prompted the UK government to commission a review from the ACMD. One man had ingested nearly 1 gram of the drug which may have been fatal without sedation with an anaesthetic dose of a benzodiazepine administered in accident and emergency.

The Advisory Council on the Misuse of Drugs stated in their report that:

"there are serious harms associated with 2-DPMP... typically prolonged agitation (lasting up to 5 days after drug use which is sometimes severe, requiring physical restraint), paranoia, hallucinations and myoclonus (muscle spasms/twitches)."

2-DPMP was due to become a class B drug on 28 March 2012, but the bill was scrapped as two steroids deemed not to be abusable were included in the bill but were later recommended to remain uncontrolled. There was a new discussion about its fate on April 23, 2012, where it was decided that the bill would be rewritten and 2-DPMP would still be banned. It was also decided that the bill would be a blanket ban of related chemicals.

Desoxypipradrol was eventually made a class B drug and placed in Schedule I on 13 June 2012. There were no recorded deaths from the drug between the banning of its import and the banning of its possession. "Esters and ethers of pipradrol" were controlled with the same amendment as class C drugs.

== See also ==
- 2-Diphenylmethylpyrrolidine
- 3-Benzhydrylmorpholine
- AL-1095
- β-Phenylmethamphetamine
- Diphenylprolinol
- Methylphenidate
- Pipradrol
- SCH-5472
- Diphenyl-2-pyridylmethane
- Diphenidine, a dissociative anaesthetic (NMDAR antagonist)
