= Cyclopropylfentanyl =

Opioid analgesic

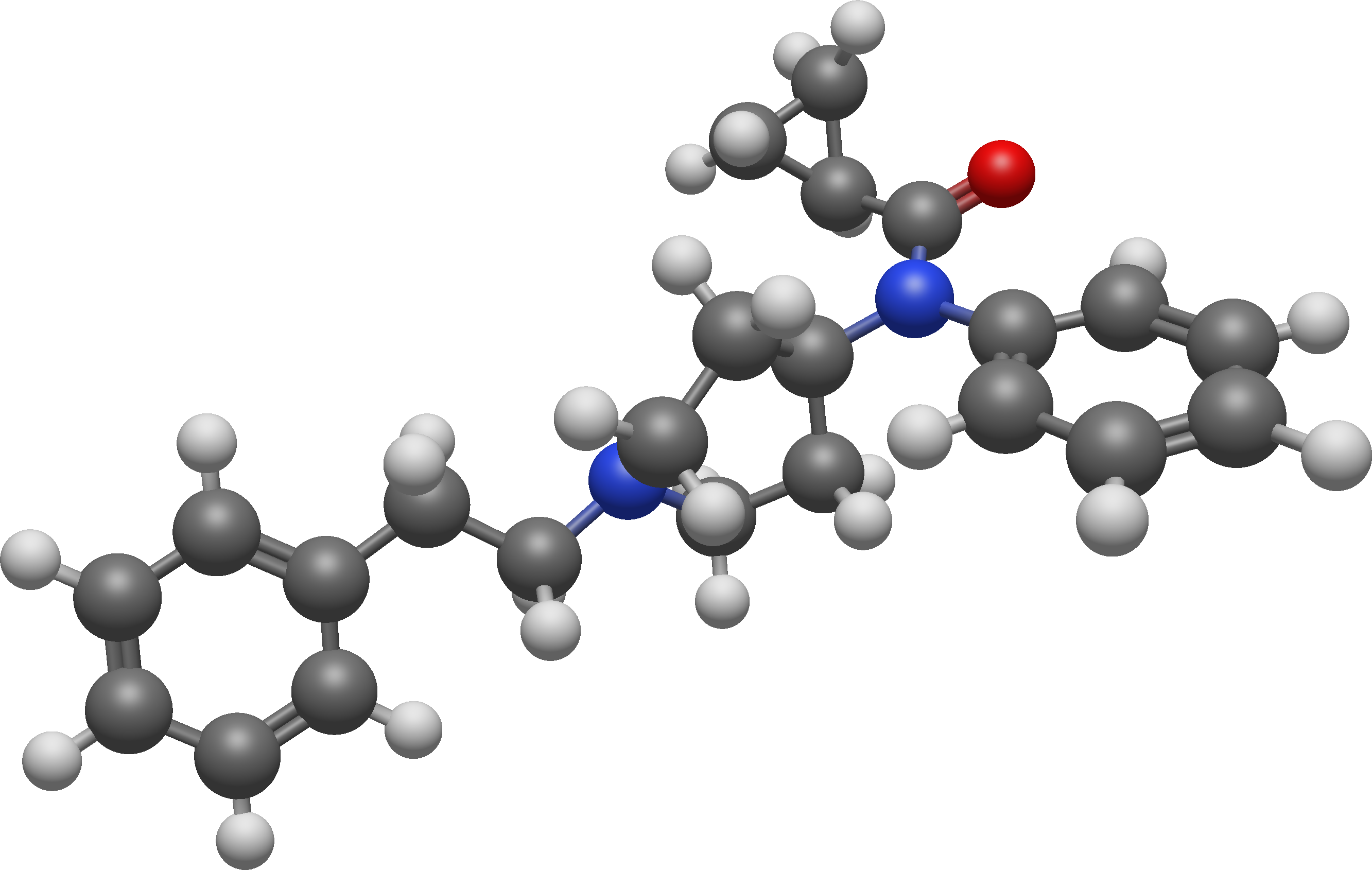

Legal status
- Legal status: BR: Class F1 (Prohibited narcotics); CA: Schedule I; DE: Anlage II (Authorized trade only, not prescriptible); UK: Class A; US: Schedule I; Illegal in the European Union

Identifiers
- IUPAC name: N-Phenyl-N-[1-(2-Phenylethyl)piperidin-4-yl]cyclopropanecarboxamide
- CAS Number: 1169-68-2
- PubChem CID: 137332271
- ChemSpider: 81367233
- UNII: 9R5A897QPI
- KEGG: C22757
- CompTox Dashboard (EPA): DTXSID101036718

Chemical and physical data
- Formula: C_{23}H_{28}N_{2}O
- Molar mass: 348.490 g·mol^{−1}
- 3D model (JSmol): Interactive image
- SMILES: C1CC1C(=O)N(C2CCN(CC2)CCC3=CC=CC=C3)C4=CC=CC=C4
- InChI: InChI=1S/C23H28N2O/c26-23(20-11-12-20)25(21-9-5-2-6-10-21)22-14-17-24(18-15-22)16-13-19-7-3-1-4-8-19/h1-10,20,22H,11-18H2; Key:OIQSKDSKROTEMN-UHFFFAOYSA-N

Cyclopropylfentanyl is an opioid analgesic that is an analog of fentanyl and has been sold as a designer drug. Between June and December 2017, a total of 78 cyclopropylfentanyl-related deaths with analytical confirmation in post-mortem samples were reported by various European countries. Another 115 deaths involving cyclopropylfentanyl were reported from the United States in 2017.

== Side effects ==
Side effects of fentanyl analogs are similar to those of fentanyl itself, which include itching, nausea and potentially serious respiratory depression, which can be life-threatening. Fentanyl analogs have killed hundreds of people throughout Europe and the former Soviet republics since the most recent resurgence in use began in Estonia in the early 2000s, and novel derivatives continue to appear. A new wave of fentanyl analogues and associated deaths began in around 2014 in the US, and have continued to grow in prevalence; especially since 2016 these drugs have been responsible for hundreds of overdose deaths every week.

== Legal status ==
Cyclopropylfentanyl was banned in Finland in September 2017, and in Sweden in October 2017. It is a Schedule I controlled drug in the USA since January 2018. In September 2018 the European Union subjected cyclopropylfentanyl to control measures.

== See also ==
- Butyrfentanyl
- Isobutyrylfentanyl
- Cyclopentylfentanyl
- Tetramethylcyclopropylfentanyl
- List of fentanyl analogues
