= AB-PICA =

Chemical compound

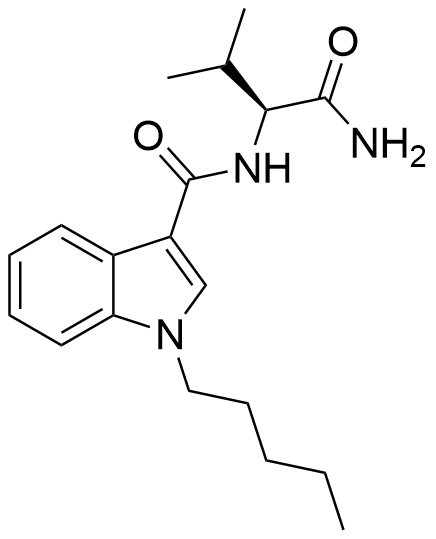

Legal status
- Legal status: CA: Schedule II; DE: NpSG (Industrial and scientific use only); UK: Class B

Identifiers
- IUPAC name: N-[(1S)-1-(aminocarbonyl)-2-methylpropyl]-1-pentyl-1H-indole-3-carboxamide
- CAS Number: 1801338-24-8
- PubChem CID: 137332257
- ChemSpider: 57427399
- UNII: BWQ0BJ2OGX; Q71G788A6H

Chemical and physical data
- Formula: C_{19}H_{27}N_{3}O_{2}
- Molar mass: 329.444 g·mol^{−1}
- 3D model (JSmol): Interactive image
- SMILES: O=C(N[C@H](C(N)=O)C(C)C)C1=CN(CCCCC)C2=CC=CC=C21
- InChI: InChI=1S/C19H27N3O2/c1-4-5-8-11-22-12-15(14-9-6-7-10-16(14)22)19(24)21-17(13(2)3)18(20)23/h6-7,9-10,12-13,17H,4-5,8,11H2,1-3H3,(H2,20,23)(H,21,24)/t17-/m0/s1; Key:GOLDNQQANLFVSP-KRWDZBQOSA-N

AB-PICA is a potent agonist for the CB_{1} receptor (EC_{50} = 12 nM) and CB_{2} receptor (EC_{50} = 12 nM).

== See also ==
- 5F-AB-PINACA
- 5F-ADB
- 5F-AMB
- 5F-APINACA
- 5F-CUMYL-PINACA
- AB-CHFUPYCA
- AB-FUBINACA
- ADB-CHMINACA
- ADB-FUBINACA
- ADB-PINACA
- ADBICA
- APICA
- APINACA
- MDMB-CHMICA
- PX-3
