= Diphenylprolinol =

Chemical compound

Clinical data
- ATC code: none

Legal status
- Legal status: DE: NpSG (Industrial and scientific use only); UK: Class B

Identifiers
- IUPAC name: diphenyl(pyrrolidin-2-yl)methanol
- CAS Number: 22348-32-9
- PubChem CID: 204386
- ChemSpider: 177034
- UNII: 54U9UN7HN4
- CompTox Dashboard (EPA): DTXSID001336517 DTXSID60944996, DTXSID001336517
- ECHA InfoCard: 100.118.791

Chemical and physical data
- Formula: C_{17}H_{19}NO
- Molar mass: 253.345 g·mol^{−1}
- 3D model (JSmol): Interactive image
- SMILES: OC(c1ccccc1)(c2ccccc2)C3NCCC3
- InChI: InChI=1S/C17H19NO/c19-17(16-12-7-13-18-16,14-8-3-1-4-9-14)15-10-5-2-6-11-15/h1-6,8-11,16,18-19H,7,12-13H2; Key:OGCGXUGBDJGFFY-UHFFFAOYSA-N

Diphenylprolinol (D2PM), or (R/S)-(±)-diphenyl-2-pyrrolidinyl-methanol, is a norepinephrine-dopamine reuptake inhibitor which is used as a designer drug.

== Pharmacology ==
The dextrorotary (R)-(+)-enantiomer is the more pharmacologically active, although a variety of related derivatives have been studied.

Side effects including chest pain (suggestive of possible cardiovascular toxicity) have been seen following recreational use of diphenylprolinol, although it was combined with glaucine in a party pill product, thus making it impossible to say for certain which drug was responsible.

== Other uses ==
Diphenylprolinol can be used to prepare the chiral CBS catalyst, which is used for enantioselective organic synthesis.

== See also ==
- 2-Diphenylmethylpyrrolidine (Desoxy-diphenylprolinol)
- Desoxypipradrol
- Laballenic acid
- Pipradrol
- Prolinol
- Corey-Bakshi-Shibata reduction
