= Pipradrol =

Withdrawn CNS stimulant medication

Clinical data
- ATC code: N06BX15 (WHO)

Legal status
- Legal status: AU: S4 (Prescription only); BR: Class B1 (Psychoactive drugs); CA: Schedule IV; DE: Anlage III (Special prescription form required); NZ: Class C; UK: Class C; US: Schedule IV; UN: Psychotropic Schedule IV

Identifiers
- IUPAC name: Diphenyl(piperidin-2-yl)methanol
- CAS Number: 467-60-7
- PubChem CID: 10083
- ChemSpider: 9681
- UNII: S6I030E0DA
- CompTox Dashboard (EPA): DTXSID2023486
- ECHA InfoCard: 100.006.723

Chemical and physical data
- Formula: C_{18}H_{21}NO
- Molar mass: 267.372 g·mol^{−1}
- 3D model (JSmol): Interactive image
- Melting point: 81–82 °C (178–180 °F)
- SMILES: OC(c1ccccc1)(c2ccccc2)C3NCCCC3
- InChI: InChI=1S/C18H21NO/c20-18(15-9-3-1-4-10-15,16-11-5-2-6-12-16)17-13-7-8-14-19-17/h1-6,9-12,17,19-20H,7-8,13-14H2; Key:XSWHNYGMWWVAIE-UHFFFAOYSA-N

Pipradrol, also known by its brand name Meratran, is a mild central nervous system stimulant that acts as a norepinephrine-dopamine reuptake inhibitor. Developed in the United States in the 1940s and patented in 1953, pipradrol was initially marketed as an antidepressant in the mid-1950s. It was subsequently used as an adjunct treatment for various conditions, including obesity, senile dementia, narcolepsy, and schizophrenia.

Despite its initial promise and relatively mild stimulant effects compared to stronger alternatives, concerns about its abuse potential led to its regulation and withdrawal from widespread use in many countries during the late 1970s. Pipradrol is now classified as a controlled substance in several nations, including the United Kingdom, where it is typically placed in less restrictive drug schedules due to its lower abuse potential compared to other stimulants.

== Dosage ==
Elixir "Alertonic" with Pipradrol hydrochloride content of 0.044 mg/mL was recommended to adults only, 1 tablespoonful (15 ml.), three times daily 30 minutes before meals for limited periods only.

== Side effects ==
Common side effects include insomnia, anorexia, tachycardia, and anxiety. Rarer side effects include dry mouth, tremor, hypertension, euphoria, depression, and very rarely psychosis or convulsions.

== Pharmacology ==
=== Pharmacodynamics ===
Pipradrol is a central nervous system stimulant that acts primarily as a norepinephrine and dopamine reuptake inhibitor. Its mechanism of action involves blocking the reuptake of these neurotransmitters, leading to increased levels in the synaptic cleft and prolonged stimulation of postsynaptic neurons. Studies have shown that pipradrol's rewarding effects may be mediated through activation of the dopamine receptor D1. Unlike amphetamines, pipradrol exhibits a more intense action on higher brain centers without significantly affecting blood pressure or respiration. It also does not decrease appetite or cause post-excitement depression typically associated with amphetamines.

=== Pharmacokinetics ===
Pipradrol is rapidly absorbed and distributed to the liver, kidney, and brain tissue. The drug is quickly metabolized and eliminated from the body, with approximately 3.5% excreted in urine and 5% in stool.

== History ==
Pipradrol was initially developed in the United States in the 1940s, patented in 1953, and marketed in the mid 1950s as the antidepressant drug Meratran. It was subsequently used as an adjunct for the treatment of obesity and management of senile dementia symptoms. There have also been numerous reports demonstrating favorable effects on a variety of conditions such as ADHD, narcolepsy, schizophrenia, and spasmodic torticollis. Pipradrol proved useful for these applications as its relatively mild stimulant effects gave it a good safety profile compared to stronger stimulants. It was also studied as an adjutant treatment for depression and schizophrenia although it was never widely used for these purposes.

Pipradrol was made illegal in many countries in the late 1970s, at the same time as many other drugs which had a history of abuse. Pipradrol is a 'phenidate' type molecule, being structurally related to the prescribed stimulant methylphenidate (Ritalin, Concerta and many other branded medicines). The relatively mild stimulant effects of pipradrol, at quantities used in commercial medicine at the time (Alertonic liquid and Meratran tablets were Australian examples), meant that pipradrol was scheduled under the less restrictive classes in most countries (i.e. Class C in United Kingdom and New Zealand) but was still considered of sufficient abuse potential to be made an illegal drug. It is now an obscure compound that is virtually unknown as an illicit drug of abuse, but is still used for some scientific research, often as a comparison drug for testing other stimulants against.
