= Nitrazolam =

Benzodiazepine designer drug

Legal status
- Legal status: CA: Schedule IV; DE: NpSG (Industrial and scientific use only); UK: Under Psychoactive Substances Act

Identifiers
- IUPAC name: 1-methyl-8-nitro-6-phenyl-4H-[1,2,4]triazolo[4,3-a][1,4]benzodiazepine
- CAS Number: 28910-99-8
- PubChem CID: 20317278
- ChemSpider: 15387105
- UNII: K499DBB308
- CompTox Dashboard (EPA): DTXSID401045827

Chemical and physical data
- Formula: C_{17}H_{13}N_{5}O_{2}
- Molar mass: 319.324 g·mol^{−1}
- 3D model (JSmol): Interactive image
- SMILES: Cc1nnc2CN=C(c3ccccc3)c4cc(ccc4n12)[N+]([O-])=O
- InChI: InChI=1S/C17H13N5O2/c1-11-19-20-16-10-18-17(12-5-3-2-4-6-12)14-9-13(22(23)24)7-8-15(14)21(11)16/h2-9H,10H2,1H3; Key:OYRPNABWTHDOFK-UHFFFAOYSA-N

Nitrazolam is a triazolobenzodiazepine (TBZD) , which are benzodiazepine (BZD) derivatives, that has been sold online as a designer drug.

It is closely related to clonazolam or flunitrazolam, only differing by the removal of a chlorine or fluorine group respectively at the benzene ring.

A study in mice indicated that nitrazolam can be several times more potent than diazepam as an antagonist of electroshock-induced tonic-extensor convulsions but less potent than diazepam at preventing the righting reflex.

Nitrazolam has been used as an example compound to demonstrate the microscale synthesis of reference materials utilizing polymer‐supported reagents.

== Legal status ==
=== United Kingdom ===
In the UK, nitrazolam has been classified as a Class C drug by the May 2017 amendment to The Misuse of Drugs Act 1971 along with several other designer benzodiazepine drugs.

== See also ==
- Adinazolam
- Alprazolam (licensed)
- Flubromazolam
- Nifoxipam
- Nitemazepam
- Pyrazolam
- Triazolam (licensed)
