= Flualprazolam =

Triazolobenzodiazepine drug

Legal status
- Legal status: AU: Unscheduled; BR: Class B1 (Psychoactive drugs); CA: Schedule IV; DE: NpSG (Industrial and scientific use only); NZ: Unscheduled; UK: Class C; US: Schedule I; UN: Psychotropic Schedule IV; SE: Förteckning I

Identifiers
- IUPAC name: 8-Chloro-6-(2-fluorophenyl)-1-methyl-4H-benzo[f][1,2,4]triazolo[4,3-a][1,4]diazepine
- CAS Number: 28910-91-0
- PubChem CID: 10359044
- ChemSpider: 8534493
- UNII: FWF5L8D2BE
- KEGG: C22815
- CompTox Dashboard (EPA): DTXSID801132654

Chemical and physical data
- Formula: C_{17}H_{12}ClFN_{4}
- Molar mass: 326.76 g·mol^{−1}
- 3D model (JSmol): Interactive image
- SMILES: CC1=NN=C2N1C3=C(C=C(C=C3)Cl)C(=NC2)C4=CC=CC=C4F
- InChI: InChI=1S/C17H12ClFN4/c1-10-21-22-16-9-20-17(12-4-2-3-5-14(12)19)13-8-11(18)6-7-15(13)23(10)16/h2-8H,9H2,1H3; Key:MPZVLJCMGPYWQQ-UHFFFAOYSA-N

Flualprazolam is a tranquilizer of the triazolobenzodiazepine (TBZD) class, which are benzodiazepines (BZDs) fused with a triazole ring. It was first synthesised in 1976, but was never marketed. It can be seen as the triazolo version of fludiazepam. It has subsequently been sold as a designer drug, first being definitively identified as such in Sweden in 2018. It can be described as the 2'-fluoro derivative of alprazolam or the fluoro instead of chloro analogue of triazolam, and has similar sedative and anxiolytic effects.

== Legal status ==
Flualprazolam is banned in Sweden and illegal in the UK. In December 2019, the World Health Organization recommended flualprazolam for international scheduling as a Schedule IV medication under the Convention on Psychotropic Substances.

In the United States, Oregon and Virginia have placed flualprazolam into Schedule I. On 23 December 2022, the DEA announced it had begun consideration on the matter of placing flualprazolam under temporary Schedule I status. Later on 25 July 2023, the DEA published a pre-print notice that flualprazolam would become temporarily scheduled as a Schedule I controlled substance from 26 July 2023 to 26 July 2025. On 25 July 2025, and effective the following day, the DEA extended the temporary scheduling until 26 July 2026. As of 1 April 2026, flualprazolam is permanently in Schedule I under the Controlled Substances Act.

== See also ==
- Clobromazolam
- Fluadinazolam
- Fluclotizolam
- Fludiazepam
- Flubromazolam
- Pyrazolam
- Flurazepam
- Triazolam
- Clonazolam
- Etizolam
- Phenazepam
- Nitrazolam
- Ethylflualprazolam
