= Pynazolam =

Benzodiazepine research chemical

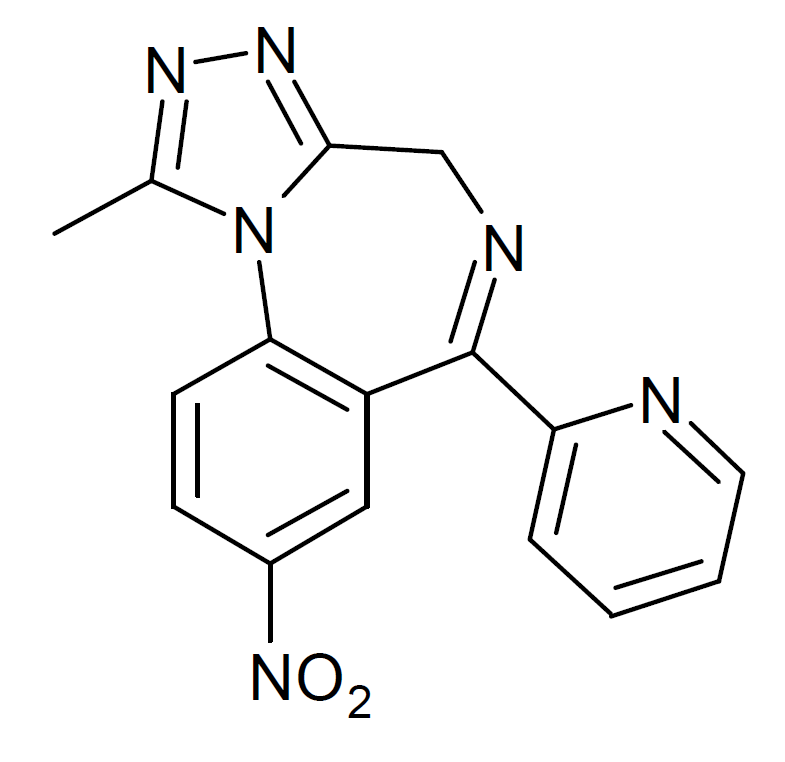

Identifiers
- IUPAC name: 1-methyl-8-nitro-6-(pyridin-2-yl)-4H-[1,2,4]triazolo[4,3-a][1,4]benzodiazepine
- CAS Number: 2034366-97-5
- PubChem CID: 20368157
- ChemSpider: 15417687

Chemical and physical data
- Formula: C_{16}H_{12}N_{6}O_{2}
- Molar mass: 320.312 g·mol^{−1}
- 3D model (JSmol): Interactive image
- SMILES: CC1=NN=C2N1C3=C(C=C(C=C3)[N+](=O)[O-])C(=NC2)C4=CC=CC=N4
- InChI: InChI=1S/C16H12N6O2/c1-10-19-20-15-9-18-16(13-4-2-3-7-17-13)12-8-11(22(23)24)5-6-14(12)21(10)15/h2-8H,9H2,1H3; Key:TULLJLNDPPOHKC-UHFFFAOYSA-N

Pynazolam is a triazolobenzodiazepine derivative which has been sold online as a designer drug. It was first described in the 1970s by a team led by Leo Sternbach, but it was never marketed.

In silico studies suggest it has relatively potent hypnotic and sedative effects. Further research is limited, and thus very little is known about the drug's pharmacological properties.

== See also ==
- Clonazolam
- Flunitrazolam
- Nitrazolam
- Pyeazolam
- Pyrazolam
- List of benzodiazepines
