= Ethylbromazolam =

Benzodiazepine research chemical

Identifiers
- IUPAC name: 8-bromo-1-ethyl-6-phenyl-4H-benzo[f][1,2,4]triazolo[4,3-a][1,4]diazepine
- CAS Number: 105470-75-5
- PubChem CID: 175667454
- ChemSpider: 129767235

Chemical and physical data
- Formula: C_{18}H_{15}BrN_{4}
- Molar mass: 367.250 g·mol^{−1}
- 3D model (JSmol): Interactive image
- SMILES: BrC1=CC=C(C2=C1)N3C(CN=C2C4=CC=CC=C4)=NN=C3CC
- InChI: InChI=InChI=1S/C18H15BrN4/c1-2-16-21-22-17-11-20-18(12-6-4-3-5-7-12)14-10-13(19)8-9-15(14)23(16)17/h3-10H,2,11H2,1H3; Key:DKTGBMWWLATMHK-UHFFFAOYSA-N

Ethylbromazolam is a benzodiazepine derivative which has been sold as a designer drug. It is structurally similar to bromazolam, only differing by the substitution of the methyl group for an ethyl group on the triazole ring. It has been found in combination with its synthetic precursor desalkylgidazepam in samples expected to contain alprazolam alone. Its global presence, analytical characterisation and GABA_{A} receptor activity has been described by researchers at Linköping University in collaboration with CanTEST, the Toronto Drug Checking Service, WEDINOS and others, finding ethylbromazolam has a similar in vitro potency to bromazolam.

== History ==
Ethylbromazolam has an extremely limited history of human usage. Very little is known about its pharmacological properties, metabolism, and potential toxicity.

It was first detected in Canada by the Toronto Drug Checking Service in November 2024, then in the United Kingdom at WEDINOS in January 2025, and has subsequently been detected in New Zealand in March 2025 and at CanTEST in April 2025.

== See also ==
- Ethylflualprazolam
