= WHO Expert Committee on Drug Dependence =

Committee appointed by the World Health Organization (WHO)

WHO Expert Committee on Drug Dependence (ECDD)
- Parent institution: World Health Organization
- Established: 1948
- Mission: Conducting the medical and scientific evaluation of drugs
- Members: 11 (Note: As of 2023, number of members were counted by the amount of individuals within the document. See reference 1.)
- Website: ECDD Website

The WHO Expert Committee on Drug Dependence (ECDD) is a committee within the World Health Organization (WHO) that consists of a chosen group of independent experts within the field of pharmacology. This committee meets once a year in order to evaluate the effects of psychotic (Note: Refers to psychoative substances) substances towards the public and the properties that cause the addictions, and considering the possible medical or therapeutic benefits and applications.

== Committee members ==
The committee is composed of different specialists (the number can vary) who are experts within the field of drugs and medicines.

== Meetings ==
Due to the large amounts of meetings in the ECDD, this list will only go as far to the 45th Committee Meeting.

46th Expert Committee on Drug Dependence Meeting was held on 16 October 2023, and reviewed 8 different drugs, such as: Benzodiazepines such as Bromazolam and Flubromazepam, Novel synthetic opioids (Note: Novel Synthetic Opoids refers to new opoids that were synthesised within laboratories or equivalent.) such as Butonitazene, Cathinones/stimulants such as 3-CMC and Dipentylone, Dissociative-type substances such as 2-fluorodeschloroketamine as well as medicines such as Nitrous Oxide (medication) and Carisoprodol.

45th Expert Committee on Drug Dependence Meeting 45th Expert Committee on Drug Dependence Meeting was held on 10 October 2022, and reviewed 9 different drugs such as: Cannabinoids such as ADB-BUTINACA, Benzodiazepines such as Adinazolam and Bromazolam, syntetic opioids such as Protonitazene, Etodesnitazene, N-pyrrolidino etonitazene) and 2-Methyl-AP-237, Stimulants such as: alpha-PiHP and 3-Methylmethcathinone (3-MMC) and medicines such as Zopiclone.

== Substances under watchlist ==
The ECDD currently have 25 drugs under their watchlist as of 2023, split into 7 different cateogories:

Amphetamine-type stimulants:

- 5-APB
- 5-MAPB
- 2-DPMP
- MDAI

Benzodiazepines:

- Adinazolam
- Bromazolam

Synthetic Cannabinoid Receptor Agonists:

- 4F-MDMB-BICA
- APINACA
- RCS-4
- JWH-250
- JWH-073

Synthetic cathinones:

- 4-Fluoromethcathinone
- Benzylone

Opioids:

- Para-methoxybutyryl fentanyl
- Parafluorofuranylfentanyl
- Kratom / mitragynine / 7-Hydroxymitragynine

Tryptamines:

- Alpha-methyltryptamine

Psychoactive Medicines:

- Gabapentin
- Ketamine
- Phenibut
- Pregabalin
- Tapentadol
- Tramadol
- Zaleplon
- Zopiclone

== See also ==
- World Health Organization
- Drugs
