= Phenazolam =

Designer benzodiazepine

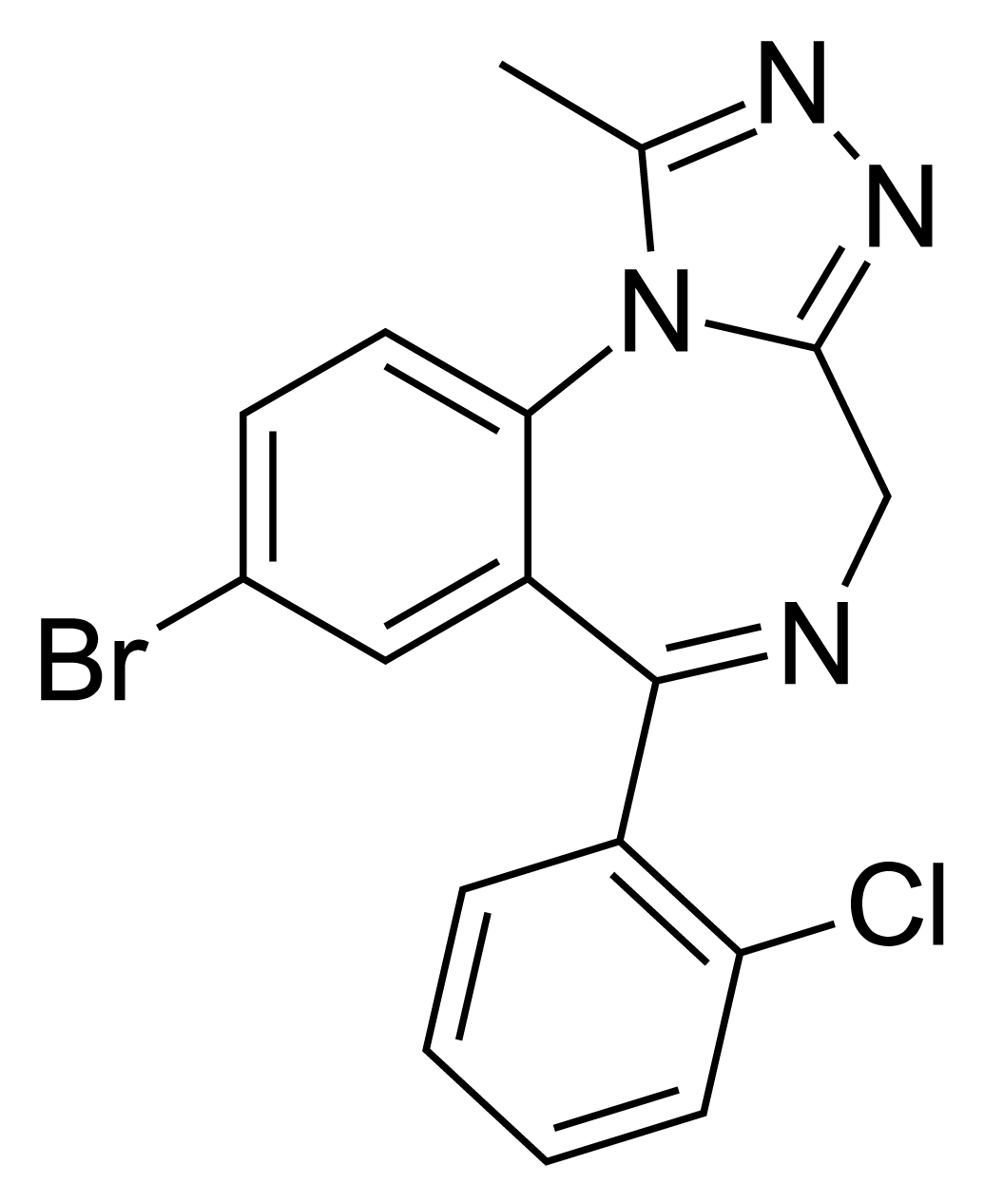

Clinical data
- Trade names: None (designer drug)

Legal status
- Legal status: CA: Schedule IV; DE: NpSG (Industrial and scientific use only); UK: Class C; US: Unscheduled; Controlled in Serbia and Italy

Pharmacokinetic data
- Bioavailability: Unknown
- Metabolism: Unknown
- Elimination half-life: 24-32 hours
- Excretion: kidneys via urine

Identifiers
- IUPAC name: 8-bromo-6-(2-chlorophenyl)-1-methyl-4H-[1,2,4]triazolo[4,3-a][1,4]benzodiazepine
- CAS Number: 87213-50-1
- PubChem CID: 1032830
- ChemSpider: 887985
- UNII: 2AVB9ZZ4ZS
- ChEMBL: ChEMBL1451229
- CompTox Dashboard (EPA): DTXSID10236191

Chemical and physical data
- Formula: C_{17}H_{12}BrClN_{4}
- Molar mass: 387.67 g·mol^{−1}
- 3D model (JSmol): Interactive image
- SMILES: CC1=NN=C2N1C3=C(C=C(C=C3)Br)C(=NC2)C4=CC=CC=C4Cl
- InChI: InChI=1S/C17H12BrClN4/c1-10-21-22-16-9-20-17(12-4-2-3-5-14(12)19)13-8-11(18)6-7-15(13)23(10)16/h2-8H,9H2,1H3; Key:BUTCFAZTKZDYCN-UHFFFAOYSA-N

Clobromazolam (also known as phenazolam, DM-II-90, and BRN 4550445) is a synthetic benzodiazepine derivative. It is structurally related to other triazolobenzodiazepines and is believed to act as a potent sedative and hypnotic through positive allosteric modulation of the GABAA receptor. The compound was first described in the early 1980s during research into novel anxiolytic and hypnotic agents, but it was never developed or approved for medical use. Clobromazolam has emerged in the 21st century as a designer drug, being sold online and detected in forensic casework. It was first identified in seized samples by a Swedish laboratory in March 2016. Due to its high potency and lack of clinical evaluation, its use has been associated with significant safety concerns, including the risk of overdose, dependence, and severe central nervous system depression.

== Legal status ==
The legal status of clobromazolam varies internationally. It was classified as a controlled substance in Serbia in May 2019 and in Italy in March 2020. In the United States, clobromazolam is not explicitly scheduled at the federal level as of now, though it may fall under analogue legislation in certain circumstances.

== See also ==
- Bromazolam
- Clonazolam
- Flubromazolam
- Phenazepam
- SH-I-048A
- Triazolam
