= Ethylflualprazolam =

Benzodiazepine designer drug

Identifiers
- IUPAC name: 8-Chloro-1-ethyl-6-(2-fluorophenyl)-4H-benzo[f][1,2,4]triazolo[4,3-a][1,4]diazepine
- ChemSpider: 133330355

Chemical and physical data
- Formula: C_{18}H_{14}ClFN_{4}
- Molar mass: 340.79 g·mol^{−1}
- 3D model (JSmol): Interactive image
- SMILES: ClC1=CC=C2C(C(C3=CC=CC=C3F)=NCC4=NN=C(CC)N42)=C1
- InChI: InChI=InChI=1S/C18H14ClFN4/c1-2-16-22-23-17-10-21-18(12-5-3-4-6-14(12)20)13-9-11(19)7-8-15(13)24(16)17/h3-9H,2,10H2,1H3; Key:SRZYAHVJONICNV-UHFFFAOYSA-N

Ethylflualprazolam is a benzodiazepine derivative which has been sold as a designer drug. It is structurally similar to flualprazolam, only differing by the addition of an ethyl group instead of a methyl group on the triazole ring. Ethylflualprazolam was first detected in samples tested in Toronto, Canada in December 2025 in expected fentanyl samples. It has since been detected by CanTEST in March 2026 in expected alprazolam 'Xanax' and 'RO39' pills.

== Effects ==
Ethylflualprazolam is a relatively new research chemical, and very little is known about its pharmacological properties.

== See also ==
- Ethylbromazolam
- Cyclopropylflualprazolam
