= Cyclopropylflualprazolam =

Identifiers
- IUPAC name: 8-chloro-6-(2-fluorophenyl)-1-(cyclopropyl)-4H-benzo[f] [1,2,4]triazolo[4,3-a] [1,4]diazepine
- PubChem CID: 129262935

Chemical and physical data
- Formula: C_{19}H_{14}ClFN_{4}
- Molar mass: 352.80 g·mol^{−1}
- 3D model (JSmol): Interactive image
- SMILES: Fc1ccccc1C1=NCc2nnc(n2c2ccc(Cl)cc12)C1CC1
- InChI: InChI=1S/C19H14ClFN4/c20-12-7-8-16-14(9-12)18(13-3-1-2-4-15(13)21)22-10-17-23-24-19(25(16)17)11-5-6-11/h1-4,7-9,11H,5-6,10H2; Key:UKNIWZJMTJHFKB-UHFFFAOYSA-N

Cyclopropylflualprazolam is a novel benzodiazepine derivative that has been sold as a designer drug, first identified in China in 2024 as an undisclosed ingredient in "sleep candies" with supposedly all-natural herbal ingredients.

== See also ==
- Ciclotizolam
- Ethylbromazolam
- Ethylflualprazolam
