= Bromazolam =

Triazolobenzodiazepine

Legal status
- Legal status: BR: Class B1 (Psychoactive drugs); CA: Schedule IV; DE: Anlage II (Authorized trade only, not prescriptible); UK: Class C; US: Schedule I

Identifiers
- IUPAC name: 8-bromo-6-phenyl-1-methyl-4H-benzo[f] [1,2,4]triazolo[4,3-a] [1,4]diazepine
- CAS Number: 71368-80-4
- PubChem CID: 12562546
- ChemSpider: 19871738
- UNII: YMC9OT97Z1
- ChEMBL: ChEMBL3246832

Chemical and physical data
- Formula: C_{17}H_{13}BrN_{4}
- Molar mass: 353.223 g·mol^{−1}
- 3D model (JSmol): Interactive image
- SMILES: Brc1cc2C(=NCc3nnc(C)n3c2cc1)c4ccccc4
- InChI: InChI=1S/C17H13BrN4/c1-11-20-21-16-10-19-17(12-5-3-2-4-6-12)14-9-13(18)7-8-15(14)22(11)16/h2-9H,10H2,1H3; Key:KCEIOBKDDQAYCM-UHFFFAOYSA-N

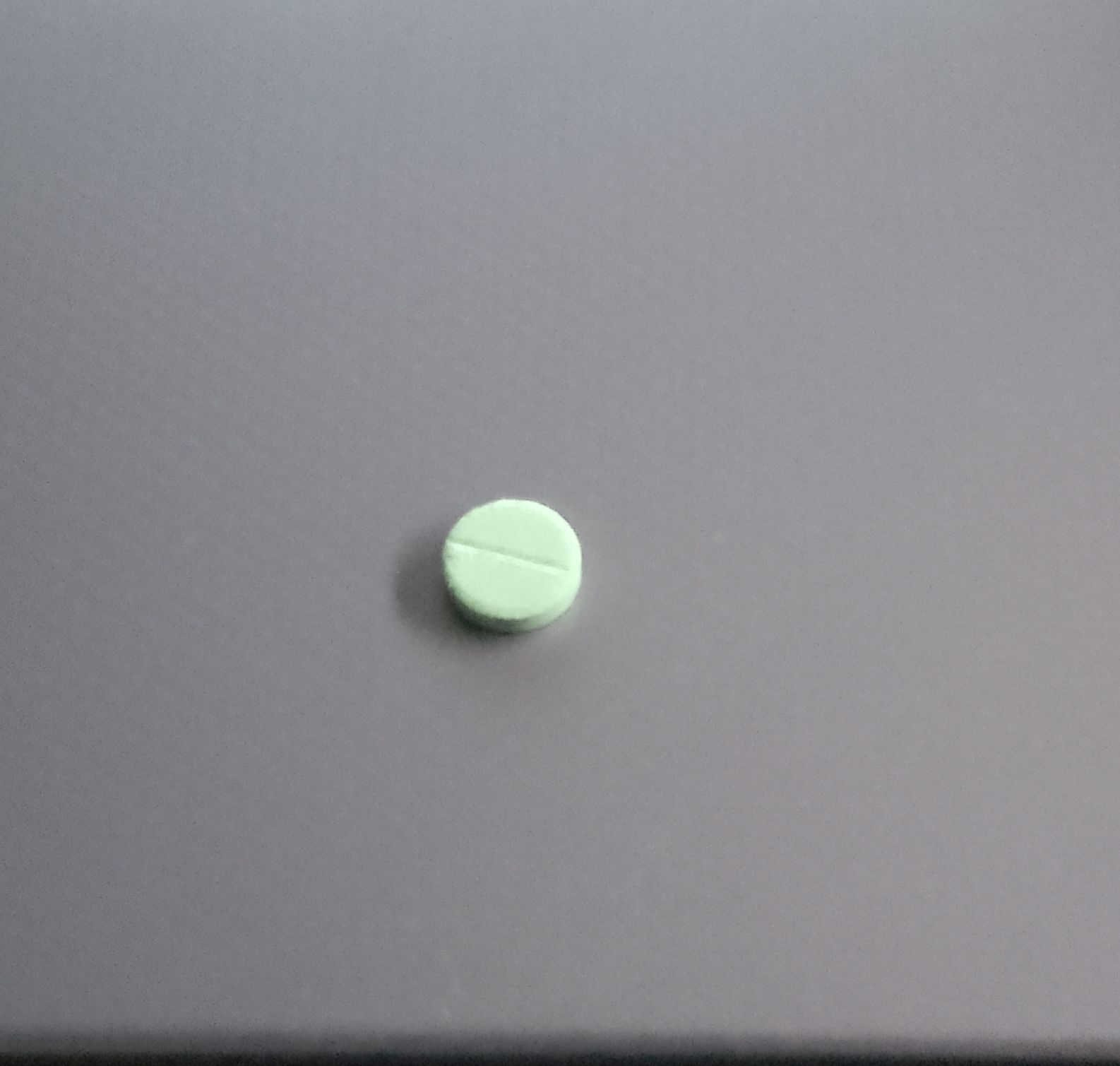
Bromazolam 3 mg pellet (tablet)

Bromazolam (XLI-268) is a triazolobenzodiazepine (TBZD) which was first synthesised in 1976, but was never marketed. It has subsequently been sold as a designer drug, first being definitively identified by the EMCDDA in Sweden in 2016. It is the bromo instead of chloro analogue of alprazolam and has similar sedative and anxiolytic effects to it and other benzodiazepines. Bromazolam is a non subtype selective agonist at the benzodiazepine site of GABA_{A} receptors, with a binding affinity of 2.81 nM at the α_{1} subtype, 0.69 nM at α_{2} and 0.62 nM at α_{5}. The "common" dosage range for users of bromazolam was reported to be 1–2 mg, suggesting its potency is similar to alprazolam.

== Adverse effects ==
Because bromazolam is relatively new, epidemiological research regarding the individual's health effects as well as the effects on the public health are quite scarce. Most of the knowledge about the effects are known from case studies and individual reports.

The typical effects of benzodiazepines used in medical science are muscle relaxation, amnesia, sedation, anxiolysis and anticonvulsive activity (used to treat epilepsy). Therefore, benzodiazepines are frequently used to treat illnesses such as anxiety, insomnia, muscle spasms or epilepsy.

Similarly to prescription benzodiazepines, bromazolam usage can lead to tolerance, addiction and dependence. Benzodiazepine-like compounds are rarely fatal when taken alone but can cause central nervous system depression when combined with other medication or drugs.

Common adverse effects of benzodiazepines are somnolence, impaired balance, ataxia, loss of coordination, impaired thinking and self-assessment capability, muscle weakness, confusion, slurred speech, blurred vision, amnesia, dizziness, drowsiness, lethargy, fatigue and palpitations. At high doses, they may induce delirium, auditory and visual hallucinations, seizures, deep sleep and coma.

To study the potential addictive nature of bromazolam a two-lever drug discrimination test was performed. Rats trained to discriminate against the benzodiazepine midazolam were used to evaluate the abuse potential of bromazolam. They found that bromazolam resulted in full dose-dependent substitution with an ED_{50} of 0.54 mg/kg. In comparison, the ED_{50} of midazolam and diazepam were 0.09 and 0.66 respectively.

== Pharmacology ==
=== Pharmacokinetics ===
==== Metabolism ====
Not many studies have been conducted on the biotransformation of bromazolam, mainly because this drug is relatively new. However, in a study of Wagmann et al. (2020), the biotransformation of bromazolam is studied in depth. The results of this study are described in the text below.

Blood plasma and urine of two individuals suspected of taking bromazolam were analysed for bromazolam and its metabolites. Bromazolam was detected in all four of the samples. One of the urine samples contained 8 bromazolam metabolites these were: phenyl-hydroxy bromazolam, 4-hydroxy bromazolam, α-hydroxy bromazolam, α-4-dihydroxy bromazolam, bromazolam N-glucuronide, phenyl-hydroxy bromazolam glucuronide, α-hydroxy bromazolam glucuronide, and 4-hydroxy bromazolam glucuronide. In the blood plasma sample of the same individual only the three mono-hydroxylated metabolites were found.

The urine of the other individual only contained two metabolites, which were also found in the other urine sample, and the blood plasma did not show any metabolite of bromazolam present in the body.

A study where pooled human liver S9 fractions (pHLS9) were incubated with bromazolam was conducted. Seven, out of the eight urine, bromazolam metabolites were found in the pHLS9 samples. Phenyl-hydroxylated glucuronide bromazolam was not found in the pHLS9 samples.

Several monooxygenases and glucuronosyltransferases have been screened, in vitro, for activity of the biotransformation of bromazolam. Out of the eight metabolites found in a urine sample seven metabolites have been linked to monooxygenases and glucuronosyltransferases activity.

===== Phase I =====
Phenyl-hydroxy bromazolam, 4-hydroxy bromazolam, α-hydroxy bromazolam, and α-4-dihydroxy bromazolam. The formation of phenyl-hydroxy bromazolam was catalysed by CYP2B6, CYP2C19, and CYP3A4. 4-hydroxy bromazolam, as well as α-hydroxy bromazolam, were formed by CYP2B6, CYP2C19, CYP3A4, and CYP3A5. Additionally, CYP2C9 was found to catalyse the formation of α-hydroxy bromazolam as well. α-4-dihydroxy bromazolam was only found in incubations with CYP3A4.

===== Phase II =====
Bromazolam N-glucuronide, phenyl-hydroxy bromazolam glucuronide, α-hydroxy bromazolam glucuronide, and 4-hydroxy bromazolam glucuronide, were detected as phase II metabolites.

Bromazolam N-glucuronidation was found to be catalysed by UGT1A4 and UGT2B10. The formation of α-hydroxy bromazolam glucuronide was catalysed by UGT2B4. And 4-hydroxy bromazolam glucuronidation was catalysed by UGT1A3, UGT1A6, UGT1A9, UGT2B7 and UGT2B15.

The enzyme responsible for the catalysis for the phenyl-hydroxy bromazolam glucuronidation formation was not identified.

=== Pharmacodynamics ===
Benzodiazepine like compounds are acting as positive allosteric modulators to the gamma-aminobutyric acid GABA_{A} receptor. GABA is the main inhibitor of neurotransmitters in the brain and modulates the activity of many neurons.

Benzodiazepines bind to the GABA_{A} receptor inducing a conformational change leading to an increased affinity to GABA.

The allosteric binding site is situated in a "pocket" created by the alpha and gamma subunits. The pharmacological effects on benzodiazepines vary based on which alpha subunit of the GABA_{A} receptor the benzodiazepine binds to.

The sedative, anterograde amnesic, anticonvulsant actions, and the addictive nature of benzodiazepines, are due to the binding to the α_{1} subunit of the (GABA)_{A} receptor. Binding to the α_{2} subunit will cause the anxiolytic effects, and binding to the α_{2}, α_{3}, and α_{5} subunits will lead to the myorelaxant effects.

According to research done by the WHO bromazolam binds to the α_{1}, α_{2}, and α_{5} subunits.

== Chemistry ==
=== Synthesis ===
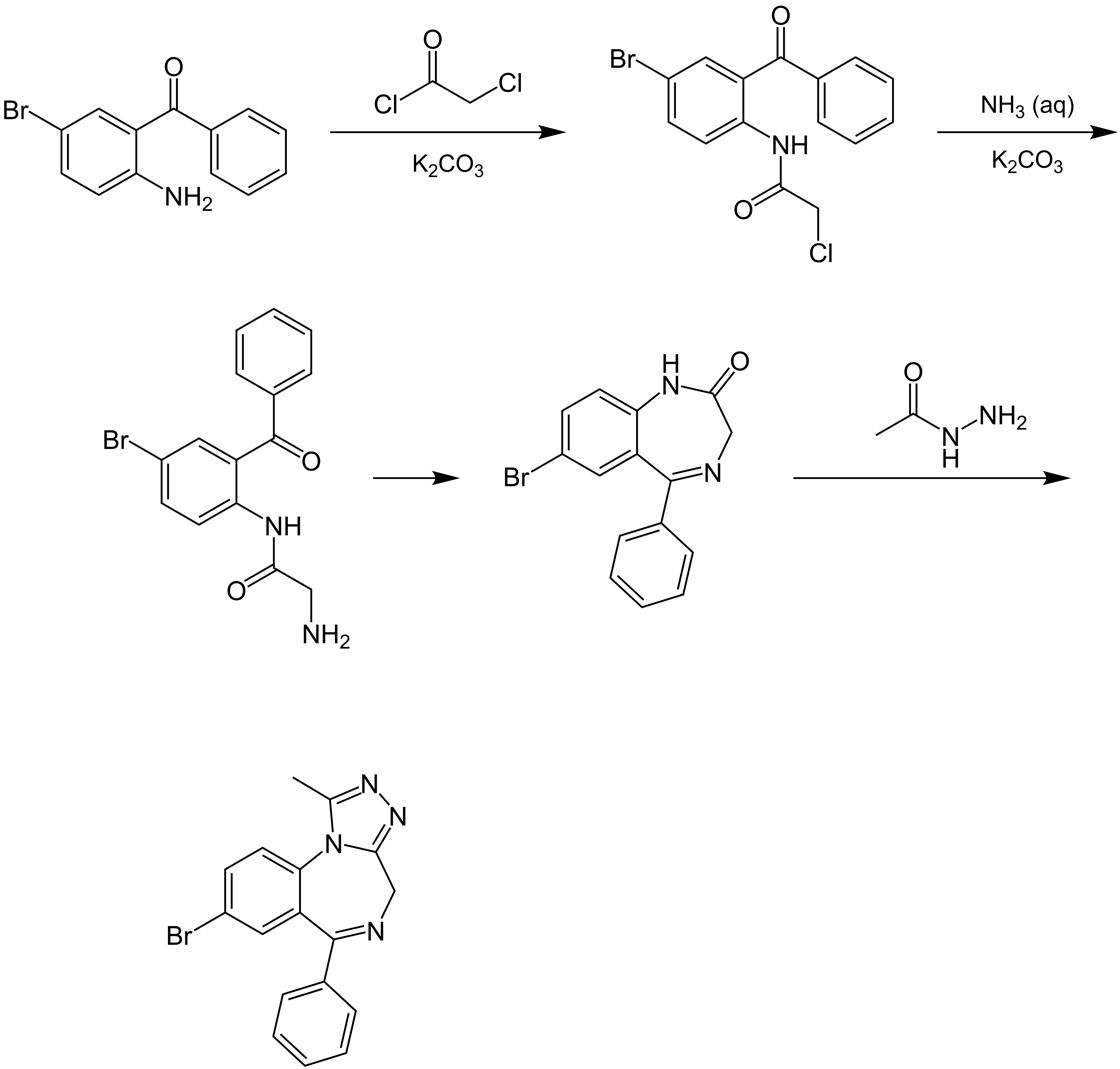
Proposed synthesis of bromazolam

In the initial step, 2-Amino-5-bromobenzophenone undergoes acylation, leveraging its amino group with a lone pair on the nitrogen atom. This lone pair facilitates a nucleophilic attack, where the nitrogen attacks the carbon of chloroacetyl chloride, inducing a negatively charged oxygen. Subsequently, the oxygen re-establishes the carbon-oxygen double bond, expelling a chloride ion, leading to the formation of bromoacetamide-2-chloro-5-benzophenone.

Following this, bromoacetamide-2-chloro-5-benzophenone engages in a nucleophilic substitution reaction with ammonium hydroxide as a nucleophile, replacing the second chloride ion with ammonia. This reaction yields 2-amino-N-(2-benzoyl-4-bromophenyl)acetamide.

Upon the formation of 2-amino-N-(2-benzoyl-4-bromophenyl)acetamide, an intramolecular reaction ensues, resulting in 7-bromo-5-phenyl-1,3-dihydro-1,4-benzodiazepin-2-one, characterized by a seven-membered ring known as diazepine.

Subsequently, through the aid of acetohydrazide, another acylation event takes place, giving rise to a 1,2,4-triazole ring and ultimately yielding bromazolam. This synthesis can also be used to obtain alprazolam by using 2-amino-5-chlorobenzophenone as the starting material.

== Society and culture ==
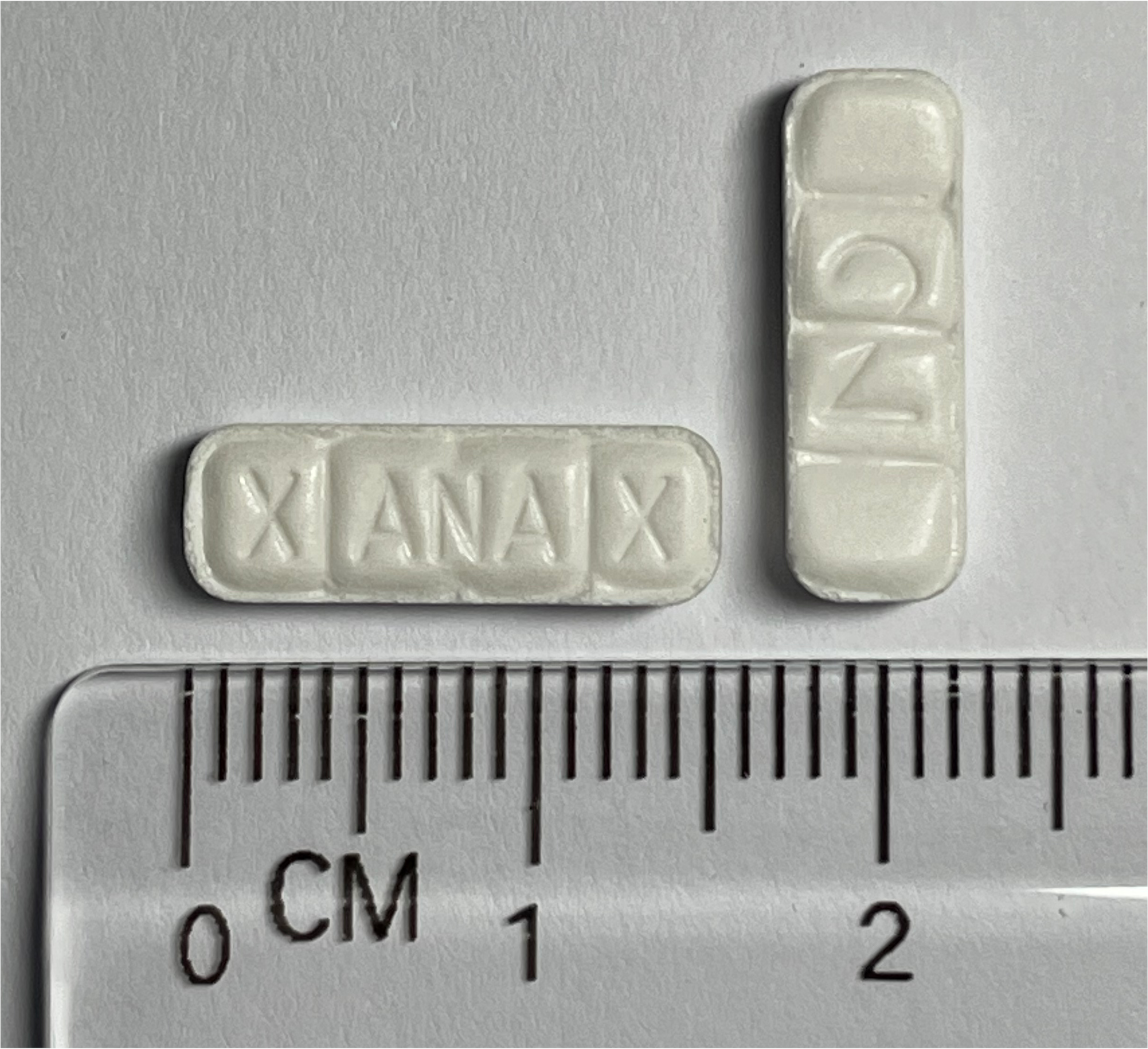
Tablets sold in the UK as "Xanax" (alprazolam), which were actually found to contain a mixture of bromazolam and caffeine

=== Legal status ===
United States

In the United States, bromazolam was placed under emergency Schedule I status on March 18, 2026, effective until March 18, 2028, with a possible temporary extension or permanent placement.

A number of states, such as Virginia, have also placed bromazolam into Schedule 1 at the state level, but this does not include the 6-(2-chlorophenyl) analog phenazolam.

Prior to its emergency scheduling, there have been several arrests in the United States for mismarketing bromazolam as alprazolam, typically in the shape of brand name Xanax tablets which constitutes a counterfeit drug charge among others.

In August 2021, at least 1 person in Illinois was arrested for "unlawful possession of a controlled substance, a Class 4 felony." for the possession of less than 15 grams (½ oz.) of bromazolam, similar to being charged for unlawful possession of alprazolam in Illinois. It is unknown if this arrest involved counterfeit Xanax shaped tablets or powder. However, bromazolam was not scheduled in Illinois at the time of the arrest.

In June 2022, the U.S. Department of Justice reported that bromazolam seizures were "surging" across the United States, driven in part by increasing detections alongside fentanyl.

Canada

In Canada, illicit opioids such as heroin or fentanyl analogues are mixed with bromazolam and sold at the street level; the product is sometimes referred to as "benzo-dope."

United Kingdom

In the United Kingdom, bromazolam is a Class C controlled substance.

== See also ==
- Clobromazolam
- Flualprazolam
- Flubromazolam
- Pyrazolam
- Triazolam
