= Clonazolam =

Triazolobenzodiazepine/Clonazepam derivative

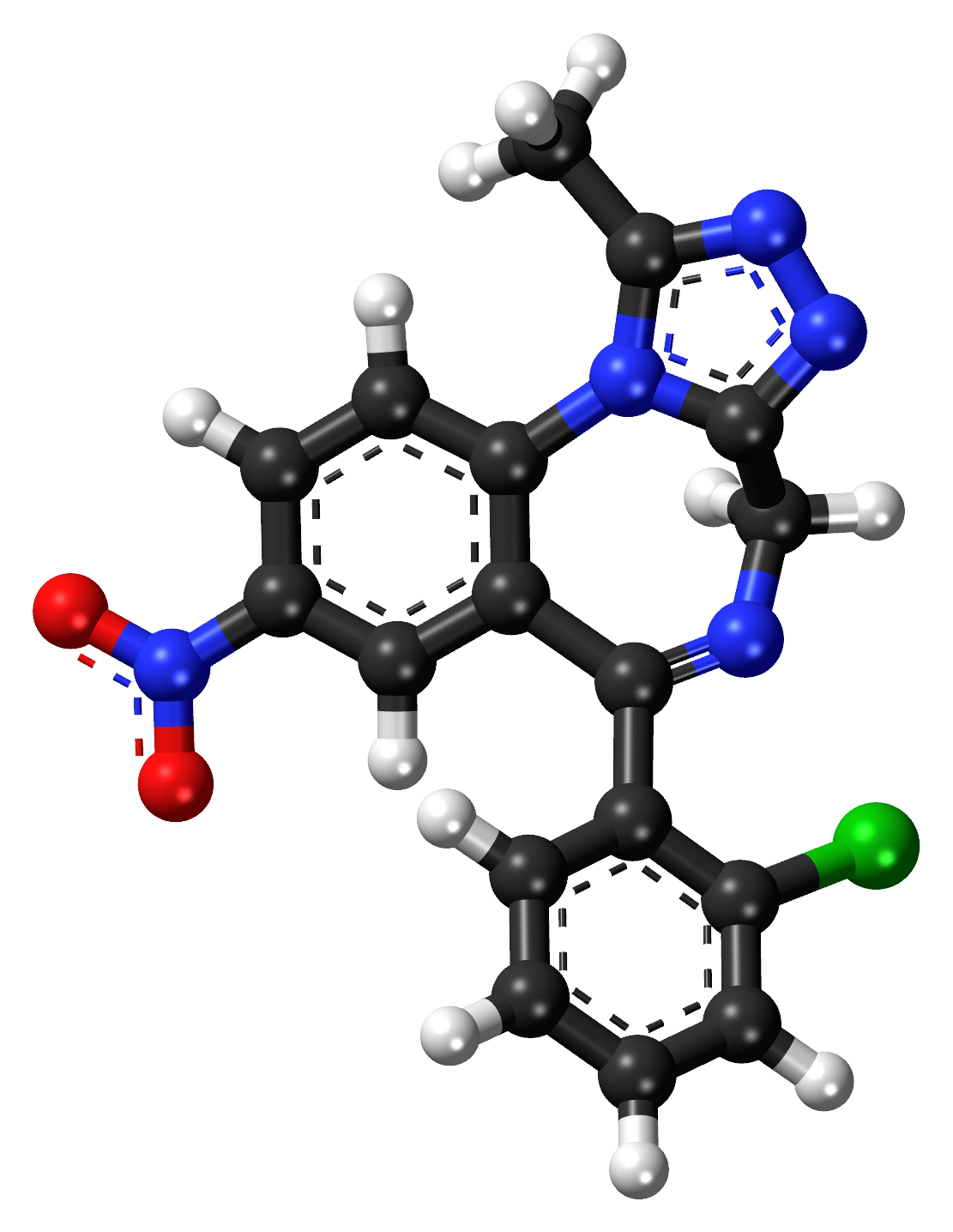

Clinical data
- Dependence liability: Very high
- Routes of administration: Oral

Legal status
- Legal status: AU: S9 (Prohibited substance); BR: Class B1 (Psychoactive drugs); CA: Unscheduled; DE: NpSG (Industrial and scientific use only); NZ: Class C (illegal); UK: Class C; US: Schedule I; UN: Schedule IV

Identifiers
- IUPAC name: 6-(2-Chlorophenyl)-1-methyl-8-nitro-4H-[1,2,4]triazolo[4,3-a][1,4]benzodiazepine
- CAS Number: 33887-02-4
- PubChem CID: 12317881
- ChemSpider: 15468596
- UNII: HJH52YYC1X
- KEGG: C22814
- CompTox Dashboard (EPA): DTXSID301014166
- ECHA InfoCard: 100.428.803

Chemical and physical data
- Formula: C_{17}H_{12}ClN_{5}O_{2}
- Molar mass: 353.77 g·mol^{−1}
- 3D model (JSmol): Interactive image
- SMILES: CC1=NN=C2N1C3=C(C=C(C=C3)[N+](=O)[O-])C(=NC2)C4=CC=CC=C4Cl
- InChI: InChI=1S/C17H12ClN5O2/c1-10-20-21-16-9-19-17(12-4-2-3-5-14(12)18)13-8-11(23(24)25)6-7-15(13)22(10)16/h2-8H,9H2,1H3; Key:XJRGLCAWBRZUFC-UHFFFAOYSA-N

Clonazolam (also known as clonitrazolam) is a drug of the triazolobenzodiazepine (TBZD) class, which are benzodiazepines (BZDs) fused with a triazole ring. Although little research has been done about its effects and metabolism, it is sold online as a designer drug.

The synthesis of clonazolam was first reported in 1971 and the drug was described as the most active compound in the series tested.

Depending on dose consumed, clonazolam may pose comparatively higher risk than other designer benzodiazepines due to its ability to produce strong sedation and amnesia at doses as small as 0.5 mg.

== Legality ==
=== United Kingdom ===
In the UK, clonazolam has been classified as a Class C drug by the May 2017 amendment to The Misuse of Drugs Act 1971 along with several other designer benzodiazepine drugs.

=== United States ===
It is a Schedule I controlled substance in the United States and is not FDA approved for human consumption. Virginia state law has declared all of the following related medications are Schedule I: clonazolam, etizolam, flualprazolam, flubromazolam, and flubromazepam. Minnesota declared clonazolam a Schedule I drug in August 2020.

On 23 December 2022, the DEA announced it had begun consideration on the matter of placing clonazolam under temporary Schedule I status.

Later on 25 July 2023, the DEA published a pre-print notice that clonazolam would become temporarily scheduled as a controlled substance from 26 July 2023 to 26 July 2025. On 25 July 2025, and effective the following day, the DEA extended the temporary scheduling until 26 July 2026.

=== Australia ===
In Australia, clonazolam is Schedule 9 under federal law.

=== Sweden ===
Sweden's public health agency suggested classifying clonazolam as a hazardous substance on 1 June 2015.

== Effects ==
Clonazolam's effects are similar to other benzodiazepines, such as anxiolysis, disinhibition, lethargy, muscle relaxation, and euphoria. While no dose of clonazolam is considered "safe" due to its lack of research and extreme potency, doses higher than 0.5 mg can cause benzodiazepine overdose in some individuals. The effects of a benzodiazepine overdose include sedation, confusion, amnesia, insufficient breathing, loss of consciousness, and death. Because dependence can occur in a short period of time, or even with a large initial dose, withdrawal symptoms (including seizures and death) may occur acutely following the period of intoxication.

== See also ==
- Adinazolam
- Alprazolam
- Clonazepam, no triazole ring
- Estazolam
- Flubromazolam
- Pyrazolam
- Triazolam
