= Estazolam =

Triazolobenzodiazepine medication

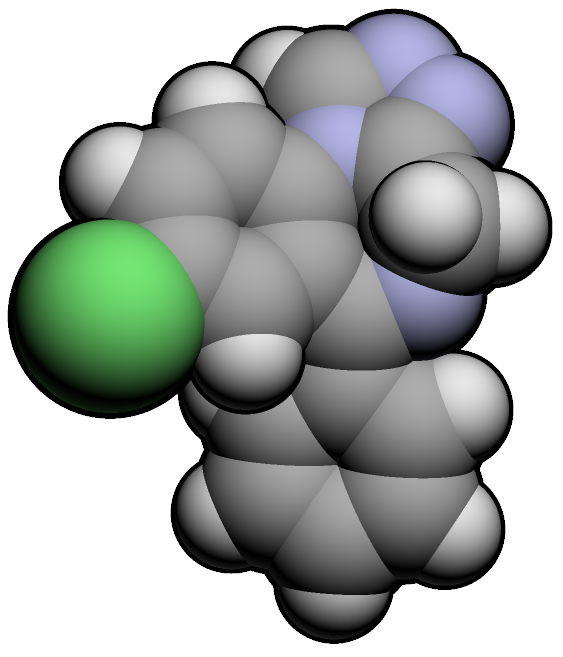

Clinical data
- Trade names: Prosom, Esilgan, Eurodin, Nuctalon, others
- Other names: Desmethylalprazolam
- AHFS/Drugs.com: Monograph
- MedlinePlus: a691003
- License data: US DailyMed: Estazolam
- Routes of administration: By mouth
- ATC code: N05CD04 (WHO)

Legal status
- Legal status: BR: Class B1 (Psychoactive drugs); CA: Schedule IV; DE: Prescription only (Anlage III for higher doses); UK: Class C; US: Schedule IV

Pharmacokinetic data
- Bioavailability: 93%
- Metabolism: Liver
- Elimination half-life: 10–24 hours
- Excretion: Kidney

Identifiers
- IUPAC name: 8-chloro-6-phenyl-4H-[1,2,4]triazolo[4,3-a][1,4]benzodiazepine
- CAS Number: 29975-16-4
- PubChem CID: 3261
- IUPHAR/BPS: 7550
- DrugBank: DB01215
- ChemSpider: 3146
- UNII: 36S3EQV54C
- KEGG: D00311
- ChEBI: CHEBI:4858
- ChEMBL: ChEMBL285674
- CompTox Dashboard (EPA): DTXSID5020572
- ECHA InfoCard: 100.045.424

Chemical and physical data
- Formula: C_{16}H_{11}ClN_{4}
- Molar mass: 294.74 g·mol^{−1}
- 3D model (JSmol): Interactive image
- SMILES: ClC1=CC2=C(C=C1)N3C=NN=C3CN=C2C4=CC=CC=C4
- InChI: InChI=1S/C16H11ClN4/c17-12-6-7-14-13(8-12)16(11-4-2-1-3-5-11)18-9-15-20-19-10-21(14)15/h1-8,10H,9H2; Key:CDCHDCWJMGXXRH-UHFFFAOYSA-N

Estazolam, sold under the brand name Prosom among others, is a tranquilizer medication of the triazolobenzodiazepine (TBZD) class, which are benzodiazepines (BZDs) fused with a triazole ring. It possesses anxiolytic, anticonvulsant, hypnotic, sedative and skeletal muscle relaxant properties. Estazolam is an intermediate-acting oral benzodiazepine. It is used for short-term treatment of insomnia.

It was patented in 1968 and came into medical use in 1975.

== Medical uses ==
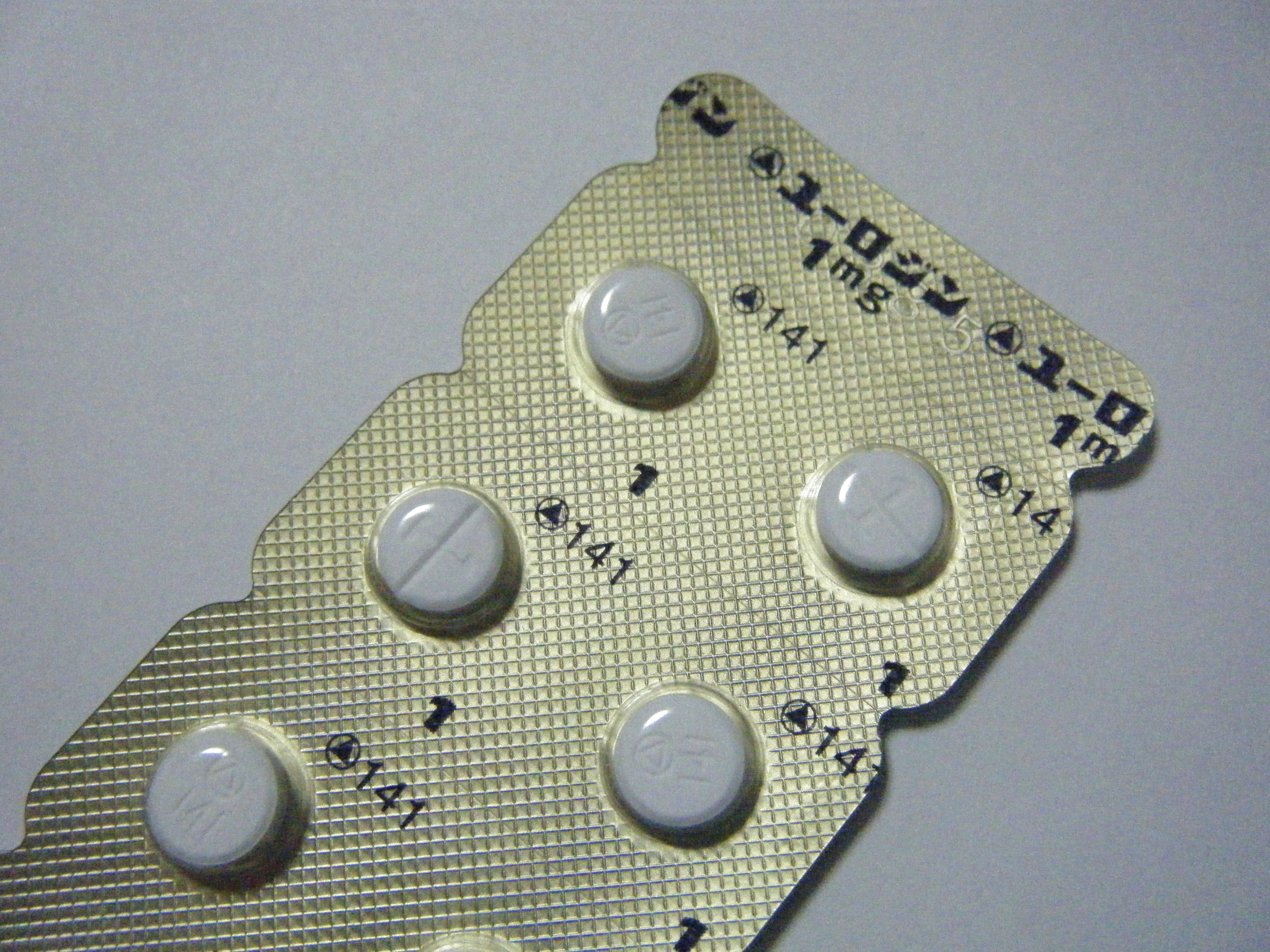
Estazolam 1mg pills, sold as Eurodin, from Japan.

Estazolam is prescribed for the short-term treatment of certain sleep disorders. It is an effective hypnotic drug showing efficacy in increasing the time spent asleep as well as reducing awakenings during the night. Combination with non-pharmacological options for sleep management results in long-term improvements in sleep quality after discontinuation of short-term estazolam therapy. Estazolam is also sometimes used as a preoperative sleep aid. It was found to be superior to triazolam in side effect profile in preoperative patients in a trial. Estazolam also has anxiolytic properties and due to its long half-life can be an effective short-term treatment for insomnia associated with anxiety.

== Side effects ==
A hang-over effect commonly occurs with next day impairments of mental and physical performance. Other side effects of estazolam include somnolence, dizziness, hypokinesia, and abnormal coordination.

In September 2020, the U.S. Food and Drug Administration (FDA) required the boxed warning be updated for all benzodiazepine medicines to describe the risks of abuse, misuse, addiction, physical dependence, and withdrawal reactions consistently across all the medicines in the class.

== Tolerance and dependence ==
The main safety concern of benzodiazepines such as estazolam is a benzodiazepine dependence and the subsequent benzodiazepine withdrawal syndrome which can occur upon discontinuation of the estazolam. A review of the literature found that long-term use of benzodiazepines such as estazolam is associated with drug tolerance, drug dependence, rebound insomnia and CNS related adverse effects. Estazolam should only be used short term and at the lowest effective dose to avoid complications related to long-term use. Non-pharmacological treatment options however, were found to have sustained improvements in sleep quality. The short-term benefits of benzodiazepines on sleep begin to reduce after a few days due to tolerance to the hypnotic effects of benzodiazepines in the elderly.

== Contraindications and special caution ==
Benzodiazepines require special precaution if used in the elderly, during pregnancy, in children, alcohol or drug-dependent individuals and individuals with comorbid psychiatric disorders.

== Pharmacology ==
Estazolam is classed as a "triazolo" benzodiazepine drug. Estazolam exerts its therapeutic effects via its benzodiazepines receptor agonist properties. Estazolam at high doses decreases histamine turnover via its action at the benzodiazepine-GABA receptor complex in mouse brains.

== Pharmacokinetics ==
Peak plasma levels are achieved within 1–6 hours. Estazolam is an intermediate acting benzodiazepine. The elimination half life of estazolam is an average of 19 hours, with a range of 8–31 hours. The major metabolite of estazolam is 4-hydroxyestazolam. Other identified metabolites include 1-oxo-estazolam, 4'-hydroxy-estazolam, and benzophenone.

== Interactions ==
Alcohol enhances the sedative hypnotic properties of estazolam. In package inserts, the manufacturer clearly warns about an interaction with ritonavir, and although clinical interactions of ritonavir with estazolam have not yet been described, the lack of clinical descriptions of the interactions does not negate the seriousness of the interaction.

== EEG effects in rabbits ==
An animal study in rabbits demonstrated that estazolam induces a drowsy pattern of spontaneous EEG including high voltage slow waves and spindle bursts increase in the cortex and amygdala, while the hippocampal theta rhythm is desynchronized. Also low voltage fast waves occur particularly in the cortical EEG. The EEG arousal response to auditory stimulation and to electric stimulation of the mesencephalic reticular formation, posterior hypothalamus and centromedian thalamus is significantly suppressed. The photic driving response elicited by a flash light in the visual cortex is significantly suppressed by estazolam.

== Abuse ==
A primate study found that estazolam has abuse potential. Two types of drug misuse can occur; recreational misuse, where the drug is taken to achieve a high or when the drug is continued long term against medical advice. Estazolam became notorious in 1998 when a large amount of an 'herbal sleeping mix' called Sleeping Buddha was recalled from the shelves after the FDA discovered that it contained estazolam. In 2007, a Canadian product called Sleepees was recalled after it was found to contain undeclared estazolam.

== See also ==
- Alprazolam
- Benzodiazepine
- Benzodiazepine dependence
- Benzodiazepine withdrawal syndrome
- Long-term effects of benzodiazepines
- Brotizolam
- Midazolam
- Triazolam
