= Fluadinazolam =

Chemical compound

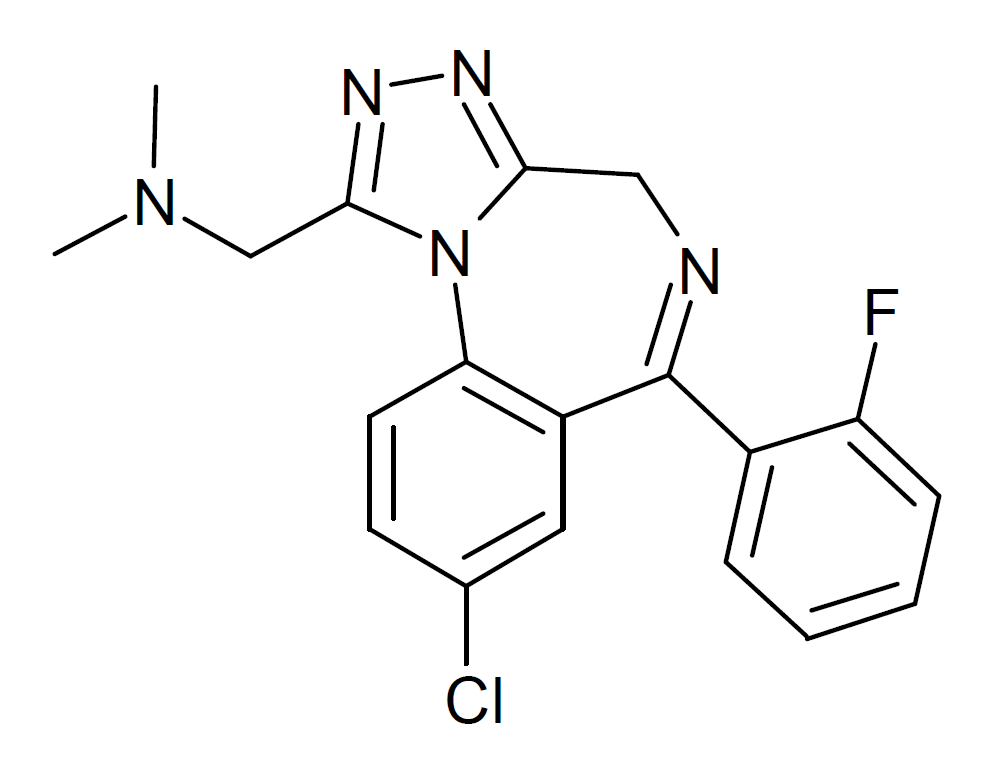

Identifiers
- IUPAC name: 8-chloro-6-(2-fluorophenyl)-1-(N,N-dimethylaminomethyl)-4H-benzo[f][1,2,4]triazolo[4,3-a][1,4]diazepine
- CAS Number: 37391-59-6
- PubChem CID: 21537253
- CompTox Dashboard (EPA): DTXSID701337059

Chemical and physical data
- Formula: C_{19}H_{17}ClFN_{5}
- Molar mass: 369.83 g·mol^{−1}
- 3D model (JSmol): Interactive image
- SMILES: CN(C)CC1=NN=C2N1C3=C(C=C(C=C3)Cl)C(=NC2)C4=CC=CC=C4F
- InChI: InChI=1S/C19H17ClFN5/c1-25(2)11-18-24-23-17-10-22-19(13-5-3-4-6-15(13)21)14-9-12(20)7-8-16(14)26(17)18/h3-9H,10-11H2,1-2H3; Key:YCELIAHHTLUQQU-UHFFFAOYSA-N

Fluadinazolam is a benzodiazepine derivative developed in 1973, with sedative and anxiolytic effects. It is a derivative of the never commercially marketed benzodiazepine adinazolam and has similarly been sold as a designer drug.

== See also ==
- Flualprazolam
- Flubromazepam
- Fluclotizolam
- Fludiazepam
- Flutemazepam
