= Triazolobenzodiazepine =

Pharmaceutical drug class

Chemical structure of alprazolam, a common triazolobenzodiazepine

Triazolobenzodiazepines (TBZD) are a class of benzodiazepine (BZD) derivative pharmaceutical drugs. Chemically, they differ from other benzodiazepines by having an additional triazole ring fused to the diazepine ring. The triazole and diazepine rings share a nitrogen atom.

Examples include:

- Adinazolam
- Alprazolam
- Bromazolam
- Clonazolam
- Estazolam
- Flualprazolam
- Flubromazolam
- Flunitrazolam
- Nitrazolam
- Pyrazolam
- Triazolam

== Synthesis ==
Synthesis of 1-methyltriazolobenzodiazepines (alprazolam type) is possible by heating 1,4-benzodiazepin-2-thiones with hydrazine and acetic acid in n-butanol under reflux.
