= Flunitrazolam =

Triazolobenzodiazepine drug

Legal status
- Legal status: BR: Class B1 (Psychoactive drugs); CA: Schedule IV; DE: NpSG (Industrial and scientific use only); UK: Under Psychoactive Substances Act

Identifiers
- IUPAC name: 1-methyl-8-nitro-6-(2-fluorophenyl)-4H-[1,2,4]triazolo[4,3-a][1,4]benzodiazepine
- CAS Number: 2243815-18-9
- PubChem CID: 137700379
- ChemSpider: 59718543
- UNII: OK0I6HTR1Y
- CompTox Dashboard (EPA): DTXSID601024059

Chemical and physical data
- Formula: C_{17}H_{12}FN_{5}O_{2}
- Molar mass: 337.314 g·mol^{−1}
- 3D model (JSmol): Interactive image
- SMILES: O=[N](=O)c4ccc2-n1c(C)nnc1CN=C(c2c4)c3ccccc3F
- InChI: InChI=1S/C17H12FN5O2/c1-10-20-21-16-9-19-17(12-4-2-3-5-14(12)18)13-8-11(23(24)25)6-7-15(13)22(10)16/h2-8H,9H2,1H3; Key:RDLAGIOILLWVTM-UHFFFAOYSA-N

Flunitrazolam (FNTZ, Flunazolam) is a triazolobenzodiazepine (TBZD), which are benzodiazepine (BZD) derivatives, that has been sold online as a designer drug, and is a potent hypnotic and sedative drug similar to related compounds such as flunitrazepam, clonazolam and flubromazolam. It was first definitively identified and reported to the EMCDDA Early Warning System, by an analytical laboratory in Germany in October 2016, and had not been described in the scientific or patent literature before this. It is the triazole analogue of Flunitrazepam (Rohypnol). The addition of the triazole ring to the scaffold increases potency significantly, this is evident as flunitrazolam is reported anecdotally to be active in the microgram level. It is active at 0.1 mg.

== See also ==
- List of benzodiazepines
