= WEDINOS =

Public health laboratory in Wales, United Kingdom

WEDINOS (an acronym for Welsh Emerging Drugs and Identification of Novel Substances) is a public health laboratory in Cardiff, Wales devoted to drug checking and epidemiological surveillance of recreational drugs and prescription drugs obtained from unsanctioned sources. It is the only fixed-site facility in the United Kingdom devoted to this task. It was established in 2013, and is funded by Public Health Wales.

Although based and funded in Wales, WEDINOS analyzes samples sent from anywhere in the United Kingdom.

WEDINOS results show high levels of mis-labeling and adulteration of contributed samples of drugs. As of 2025, WEDINOS data showed that 43% of supposed cannabis samples contained no plant-derived materials, with 38% containing noxious substances.

== See also ==
- Temporary class drug order
