= Flubromazolam =

Triazolobenzodiazepine drug

Legal status
- Legal status: BR: Class B1 (Psychoactive drugs); CA: Schedule IV; DE: Anlage II (Authorized trade only, not prescriptible); UK: Under Psychoactive Substances Act; US: Schedule I; Illegal in Sweden and Switzerland

Identifiers
- IUPAC name: 8-bromo-6-(2-fluorophenyl)-1-methyl-4H-[1,2,4]triazolo[4,3-a] [1,4]benzodiazepine
- CAS Number: 612526-40-6
- PubChem CID: 21930924
- ChemSpider: 10684757
- UNII: 1BF1HN5GWD
- KEGG: C22817
- CompTox Dashboard (EPA): DTXSID40620266
- ECHA InfoCard: 100.428.311

Chemical and physical data
- Formula: C_{17}H_{12}BrFN_{4}
- Molar mass: 371.213 g·mol^{−1}
- 3D model (JSmol): Interactive image
- SMILES: BrC1=CC3=C(C=C1)[N]2C(=NN=C2C)CN=C3C4=C(C=CC=C4)F
- InChI: InChI=1S/C17H12BrFN4/c1-10-21-22-16-9-20-17(12-4-2-3-5-14(12)19)13-8-11(18)6-7-15(13)23(10)16/h2-8H,9H2,1H3; Key:VXGSZBZQCBNUIP-UHFFFAOYSA-N

Flubromazolam (JYI-73) is a triazolobenzodiazepine (TBZD), which are benzodiazepine (BZD) derivatives. Flubromazolam is reputed to be highly potent, and concerns have been raised that clonazolam and flubromazolam in particular may pose comparatively higher risks than other designer benzodiazepines, due to their ability to produce strong sedation and amnesia at oral doses of as little as 0.5 mg. Life-threatening adverse reactions have been observed at doses of only 3 mg of flubromazolam.

== Legal status ==
=== Sweden ===
Flubromazolam has been classified as an illegal substance in Sweden after seizures by customs and police, as well as indications from the EMCDDA of wider use as a recreational drug.

=== Switzerland ===
Flubromazolam is illegal in Switzerland as of December 2015.

=== United Kingdom ===
In the UK, flubromazolam has been classified as a Class C drug by the May 2017 amendment to The Misuse of Drugs Act 1971 along with several other designer benzodiazepine drugs.

=== Australia ===
In Australia, flubromazolam is Schedule 9 under federal law.

=== United States ===
Flubromazolam is controlled in Virginia and Wisconsin. On 23 December 2022, the DEA announced it had begun consideration on the matter of placing flubromazolam under temporary Schedule I status. Later on 25 July 2023, the DEA published a pre-print notice that flubromazolam would become temporarily scheduled as a Schedule I controlled substance from 26 July 2023 to 26 July 2025. On July 25, 2025, and effective the following day, the DEA extended the temporary scheduling until July 26, 2026. Effective 1 April 2026, flubromazolam is permanently Schedule I under the Controlled Substances Act.

== See also ==
- 3-Hydroxyphenazepam
- Adinazolam
- Bromazolam
- Desmethyletizolam
- Desmethylflunitrazepam
- Diclazepam
- Etizolam
- Flualprazolam
- Flubrotizolam
- Meclonazepam
- Nifoxipam
- Phenazepam
- Pyrazolam
