= CanTEST =

Pill testing service in Canberra, Australia

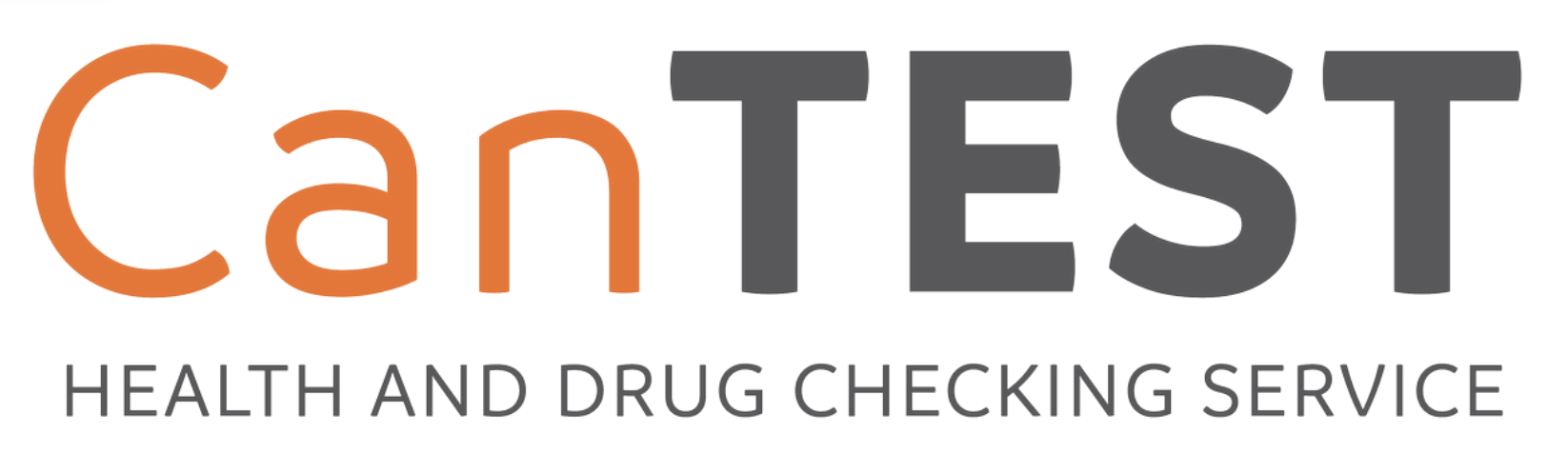

CanTEST is a harm reduction and pill testing service based in Canberra, Australia. The service is free and confidential, providing chemical analysis and harm reduction advice from registered nurses and qualified peer workers. CanTEST was established in July 2022 and was the first fixed-site pill testing service in Australia. The service was initially granted a six-month pilot but has since been renewed for continuous operation until at least June 2027. The service publishes monthly reports detailing the results of pill testing and harm reduction advice including the average purity of substances and the post-checking likelihood of use. Results from the report indicated that 70% of users had never previously accessed a healthcare worker for information or advice about drug use, with 98% of those using the service recommending it to others.

CanTEST results have since been reported to the community through social media and news articles with the impact of individual test results often reaching beyond the original client. CanTEST has identified multiple drugs which have never been detected anywhere else before, 2F-NENDCK (also known as CanKet) was detected in August 2022. Since CanTEST has begun operations, other trials have been conducted in NSW, Victoria, and Queensland. Pill testing has since been banned in Queensland by their choice not to renew the CheQpoint pill-testing facility, however operations are continuing in New South Wales and Victoria as of November 2025.
