= Adinazolam =

Triazolobenzodiazepine drug

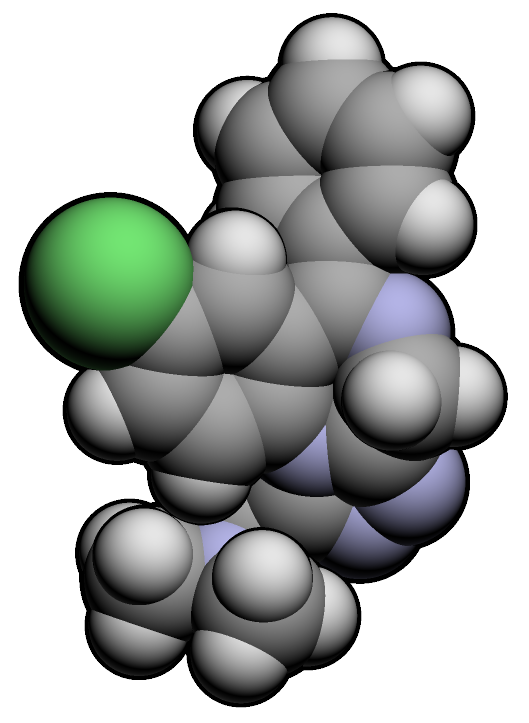

Clinical data
- Trade names: Deracyn
- Routes of administration: Oral
- ATC code: N05BA07 (WHO)

Legal status
- Legal status: AU: S4 (Prescription only); BR: Class B1 (Psychoactive drugs); CA: Schedule IV; DE: NpSG (Industrial and scientific use only); UK: Class C; US: Unscheduled (Not FDA approved); UN: Unscheduled

Pharmacokinetic data
- Metabolism: Hepatic
- Metabolites: N-desmethyladinazolam; N,N-didesmethyladinazolam; estazolam; alpha-hydroxy-alprazolam
- Elimination half-life: < 3 hours
- Excretion: Renal

Identifiers
- IUPAC name: 1-(8-Chloro-6-phenyl-4H-[1,2,4]triazolo[4,5-a][1,4]benzodiazepin-1-yl)-N,N-dimethylmethanamine
- CAS Number: 37115-32-5
- PubChem CID: 37632
- DrugBank: DB00546
- ChemSpider: 34519
- UNII: KN08449444
- KEGG: D02770
- ChEBI: CHEBI:251412
- ChEMBL: ChEMBL328250
- CompTox Dashboard (EPA): DTXSID40190611

Chemical and physical data
- Formula: C19H18ClN5
- Molar mass: 351.84 g·mol^{−1}
- 3D model (JSmol): Interactive image
- Melting point: 171–172.5 °C (339.8–342.5 °F)
- Solubility in water: LogP: 4.16 Soluble in dichloromethane and methanol Salt (mesylate) soluble in water mg/mL (20 °C)
- SMILES: Clc3cc2\C(=N/Cc1nnc(n1c2cc3)CN(C)C)c4ccccc4
- InChI: InChI=1S/C19H18ClN5/c1-24(2)12-18-23-22-17-11-21-19(13-6-4-3-5-7-13)15-10-14(20)8-9-16(15)25(17)18/h3-10H,11-12H2,1-2H3; Key:GJSLOMWRLALDCT-UHFFFAOYSA-N

Adinazolam (marketed under the brand name Deracyn) is a tranquilizer of the triazolobenzodiazepine (TBZD) class, which are benzodiazepines (BZDs) fused with a triazole ring. It possesses anxiolytic, anticonvulsant, sedative, and antidepressant properties. Adinazolam was developed by Jackson B. Hester, who was seeking to enhance the antidepressant properties of alprazolam, which he also developed. Adinazolam was never FDA approved and never made available to the public market; however, it has been sold as a designer drug.

== Use and purpose ==
Adinazolam is primarily used for its anxiolytic properties. As mentioned in the Introduction, and will be further explained in the Molecular mechanism of action, adinazolam is a derivative of a benzodiazepine, it acts on the GABA receptors in the central nervous system, promoting the inhibitory effects of GABA. This results in a calming effect, making it suitable for the treatment of anxiety disorders, panic disorders, and as antidepressants.

In the article of Amsterdam et al. research was done involving 43 outpatients meeting Research Diagnostic Criteria for major depression. They were randomized to receive either adinazolam or imipramine. Medication dosages were adjusted based on tolerability and needs, with weekly clinical ratings and evaluations using various scales.

It was found that adinazolam was as effective as imipramine in treating major depression, with similar efficacy in melancholic depression. Adinazolam did have some side effects like drowsiness/sedation, dry mouth, constipation, blurred vision, nausea/vomiting/diarrhea, nervousness, and headaches. However, they all showed fewer side effects than imipramine, except for drowsiness/sedation. The study suggests that adinazolam could be a promising alternative with potential therapeutic benefits, but further research is needed to clarify its clinical profile and safety.

=== Availability ===
Adinazolam was developed and tested as an antidepressant in the 1980s and 1990s but experienced a decline in research and testing following the initial evaluation period. There is limited information available regarding any further exploration of its pharmaceutical properties. The FDA's rejection of adinazolam in the 1990s led to its absence from mainstream medical use.

After this rejection, adinazolam reemerged around 2015, being used in the market as a designer drug. This change in status and function raises questions about its application in non-medical contexts. Designer drugs often present challenges for regulatory bodies due to their modified chemical compositions and susceptibility to misuse.

== Side effects ==
When using adinazolam, individuals may experience various side effects, both in the short- and long term. Initially, common side effects in the short term may include drowsiness, sedation, and mild cognitive impairment.

Overdose may include muscle weakness, ataxia, dysarthria and particularly in children paradoxical excitement, as well as diminished reflexes, confusion and coma may ensue in more severe cases.

A human study comparing the subjective effects and abuse potential of adinazolam (30 mg and 50 mg) with diazepam, lorazepam and a placebo showed that adinazolam causes the most "mental and physical sedation" and the greatest "mental unpleasantness".

In the long term, prolonged use of adinazolam could result in the development of tolerance, where higher doses are required to achieve the same therapeutic effects. Consequently, increasing doses may heighten the risk of adverse effects and potential complications. Extended use of adinazolam also carries the possibility of dependence, where individuals may become psychologically and physically reliant on the medication to manage anxiety symptoms. Dependence poses significant challenges, as rapid dose reduction can trigger withdrawal symptoms, ranging from rebound anxiety and insomnia to more severe manifestations like seizures. Furthermore, the prolonged use of adinazolam may contribute to cognitive impairment, impacting memory, concentration, and overall cognitive function.

== Pharmacodynamics and pharmacokinetics ==
Adinazolam is a pro-drug for the metabolite N-demethyl-adinazolam (NDMAD) as it is the main active metabolite in humans. However, adinazolam and its other metabolites di-N-demethyl-adinazolam, ⍺-hydroxy-alprazolam, and estrazolam are active compounds by themselves. They act on the central nervous system (CNS) by binding positively allosterically to (central) benzodiazepine receptors (BzR) which are a subset of the GABA_{A} receptor. Adinazolam has a high affinity toward the GABA_{A} receptor, however, its metabolites are 20–40 times more potent in inhibiting the binding of [^{3}H]flunitrazepam (used radiolabel).

The (GABA)_{A} receptor respond to the release of γ-aminobutyric acid (GABA) which is the main inhibitory neurotransmitter in the brain and plays an important role in modulating the activity of neurons. The GABA_{A} receptor is a protein complex located in the synapses; this protein is a ligand-gated ion channel (an ionotropic receptor) that conducts chloride ions across neuronal cell membranes. The complex consists of five subunits, two ⍺, two β, and one γ. GABA binds to the interface between the ⍺ and β subunits (2 binding sites) while benzodiazepines bind to the interface of the ⍺ and γ subunits, however, benzodiazepine binding is only possible in the presence of a histidine residue in the ⍺ varieties ⍺_{1}, ⍺_{2}, ⍺_{3} and ⍺_{5} which are called benzodiazepine receptors. The binding of adinazolam, or other benzodiazepines, acts as an agonist by inducing a conformational change in the benzodiazepine receptor which increases the affinity toward GABA, in turn reducing neuronal activity. This reduction in neuronal activity explains the observed clinical effects. The different pharmacological properties of benzodiazepines can be attributed to the variety of ⍺ subunits. The ⍺_{1} subunit is required for sedative, anterograde amnesic and anticonvulsant actions; the ⍺_{2} subunits for anxiolytic effects and for myorelaxant actions are mediated by GABA_{A} receptors containing ⍺_{2}, ⍺_{3} and ⍺_{5} subunits.

The firing of a neuron happens when its membrane potential, which is negative when resting, is increased, or depolarized, until a threshold, or action potential, is reached. When this potential is reached a voltage-gated sodium channel opens allowing sodium to rush into the cell. The binding of GABA to the GABA-A receptor prevents this by letting chloride ions into the cell decreasing, or polarizing, the membrane potential. The binding of adinazolam or other benzodiazepines increases the influx of chloride ions and therefore increasing the polarization of the membrane potential.

== Chemical information ==
=== Reactivity ===
Adinazolam contains multiple reactive parts in its structure. The first is the dimethylamine which is mildly basic with a pKa of 6.30 making over 5% of the compound protonated under physiological pH. The tertiary amine could also be important in protein binding with the ability to form hydrogen bridges and is also likely a target for metabolism via demethylation. The dimethylamine is also labile for oxidative decomposition resulting in the loss of one methyl group forming N-desmethyladinazolam. Loss of the entire dimethyl methanamine is also possible via oxidative decomposition forming estazolam. The second reactive group is the nitrogen on the 4-position. With a pKa of 5.09, it is only protonated at pH levels lower than physiological. After protonation the group is labile for hydration, which results in the opening of the diazepine ring. Afterwards, ethylamine is cleaved or the ring is closed again resulting in the other structures.

=== Synthesis ===
One logical way to synthesize adinazolam is by reacting benzodiazepine precursors. One route followed by Hester et al. starts from 7-chloro-2-hydrazineyl-5-phenyl-3H-benzo[e][1,4]diazepine. First N-Phthalimidoyl-β-alanine is formed in situ from β-alanine with phthalic anhydride. The solution is cooled and treated with carbonyldiimidazole. Then 7-chloro-2-hydrazineyl-5-phenyl-3H-benzo[e][1,4]diazepine is added to the solution, which is left to react at room temperature for 18 h. After the procedure ethyl acetate solvate was made to result in 2-(2-(8-chloro-6-phenyl-4H-benzo[f][1,2,4]triazolo[4,3-a][1,4]diazepin-1-yl)ethyl)isoindoline-1,3-dione. Subsequent treatment of 2-(2-(8-chloro-6-phenyl-4H-benzo[f][1,2,4]triazolo[4,3-a][1,4]diazepin-1-yl)ethyl)isoindoline-1,3-dione with a solution of 88% formic acid and 37% aq. formaldehyde (3:2 mol/mol) at 100 °C for 1 h under nitrogen resulted in the formation of 2-(2-(4-(2-benzoyl-4-chlorophenyl)-5-(dimethylamino)methyl)-4H-1,2,4-triazol-3-yl)ethyl)isoindoline-1,3-dione. The diazepine ring is cleaved during this step and the phthalate is transferred. In the last step, the diazepine ringed is formed back with the use of hydrazine hydrate at 70 °C for 1 hour and 30 min under nitrogen forming adinazolam.

Another route to synthesise adinazolam is via estazolam, as performed by Gall et al. During the synthesis bis-(dimethylamino) methane is dissolved in DMF and cooled to 0 °C. The solution is then treated with acetyl chloride in DMF forming a dimethyl(methylene) ammonium chloride salt. K_{2}CO_{3} is then added to the solution, followed by a solution of estazolam in DMF. The mixture is then heated to 60 °C for 3 hours resulting in adinazolam after a workup.

== Metabolism ==
Adinazolam was reported to have active metabolites in the August 1984 issue of The Journal of Pharmacy and Pharmacology. The main metabolite is N-desmethyladinazolam. NDMAD has an approximately 25-fold high affinity for benzodiazepine receptors as compared to its precursor, accounting for the benzodiazepine-like effects after oral administration. Multiple N-dealkylations lead to the removal of the dimethylaminomethyl side chain, leading to the difference in its potency. The other two metabolites are alpha-hydroxyalprazolam and estazolam. In the August 1986 issue of that same journal, Sethy, Francis and Day reported that proadifen inhibited the formation of N-desmethyladinazolam.

Adinazolam is after ingestion primarily metabolised by N-dealkylation by the hepatic pathway and, enteric pathway. Adinazolam may undergo enteric and hepatic conversion into its active metabolite after oral intake, because this drug is a CYP3A4 substrate, although enteric metabolism plays a significant role before hepatic metabolism. CYP3A4 is an enzyme in the intestines and liver, which has a crucial role in drug metabolism. Therefore, the study of the enteric metabolic pathway of adinazolam is also important to understand the overall pharmacology of this substance.

According to several studies the main metabolites of adinazolam, also known as the phase 1 metabolites which involve oxidative reactions catalysed by cytochrome P450 enzymes like CYP3A4, are mono-N-desmethyladinazolam (active metabolite) and (N,N-di)desmethyladinazolam. Mono-N-desmethyladinazolam is formed by the transformation of adinazolam where the methyl group attached to the nitrogen is removed by N-dealkylation and this active metabolite is further metabolized to desmethyladinazolam, where another methyl group is removed and replaced with a hydrogen atom. Deamination of desmethyladinazolam leads to the formation of an intermediate metabolite, which undergoes alpha-hydroxylation to form alpha-hydroxy-alprazolam or cleavage of side chain to form estazolam, which are minor metabolites. The metabolism of adinazolam and its metabolites.

== See also ==
- Benzodiazepine
- Alprazolam
- Fluadinazolam
- GL-II-73
