= Pyrazolam =

Benzodiazepine

Clinical data
- Routes of administration: Oral, Sublingual, rectal

Legal status
- Legal status: AU: S4; CA: Schedule IV; DE: NpSG (Industrial and scientific use only); UK: Class C; US: Unscheduled (Georgia Schedule IV)

Pharmacokinetic data
- Elimination half-life: 17 hours

Identifiers
- IUPAC name: 8-Bromo-1-methyl-6-(pyridin-2-yl)-4H-[1,2,4]triazolo[4,3-a][1,4]benzodiazepine
- CAS Number: 39243-02-2
- PubChem CID: 12562545
- ChemSpider: 15417688
- UNII: 8LH16383PK
- ChEMBL: ChEMBL3246831
- CompTox Dashboard (EPA): DTXSID101043303

Chemical and physical data
- Formula: C_{16}H_{12}BrN_{5}
- Molar mass: 354.211 g·mol^{−1}
- 3D model (JSmol): Interactive image
- SMILES: CC1=NN=C2CN=C(C3=NC=CC=C3)C3=CC(Br)=CC=C3N12
- InChI: InChI=1S/C16H12BrN5/c1-10-20-21-15-9-19-16(13-4-2-3-7-18-13)12-8-11(17)5-6-14(12)22(10)15/h2-8H,9H2,1H3; Key:BGRWSFIQQPVEML-UHFFFAOYSA-N

Pyrazolam (SH-I-04) is a benzodiazepine derivative originally developed by a team led by Leo Sternbach at Hoffman-La Roche in the 1970s. It has since been "rediscovered" and sold as a designer drug since 2012.

Pyrazolam has structural similarities to alprazolam and bromazolam. Unlike other benzodiazepines, pyrazolam does not appear to undergo metabolism, instead being excreted unchanged in the urine.

== Legal status ==
=== United Kingdom ===
In the UK, pyrazolam has been classified as a Class C drug by section 5 of the May 2017 amendment to The Misuse of Drugs Act 1971 along with several other designer benzodiazepine drugs.

=== United States ===
Unscheduled at the federal level.

Alabama made Pyrazolam a schedule I substance on March 18th, 2014.

== Synthesis ==

The condensation of bromazepam (1) with methylamine and titanium tetrachloride gives the amidine (2). Treatment with nitrous acid gives the nitrosylation product (3). Further reaction with hydrazine gives (4), which is treated with triethyl orthoacetate to complete the synthesis of pyrazolam.

== See also ==
- List of benzodiazepines
- Pyeazolam
- Pynazolam
