= Triazolam =

Triazolobenzodiazepine sleep medication

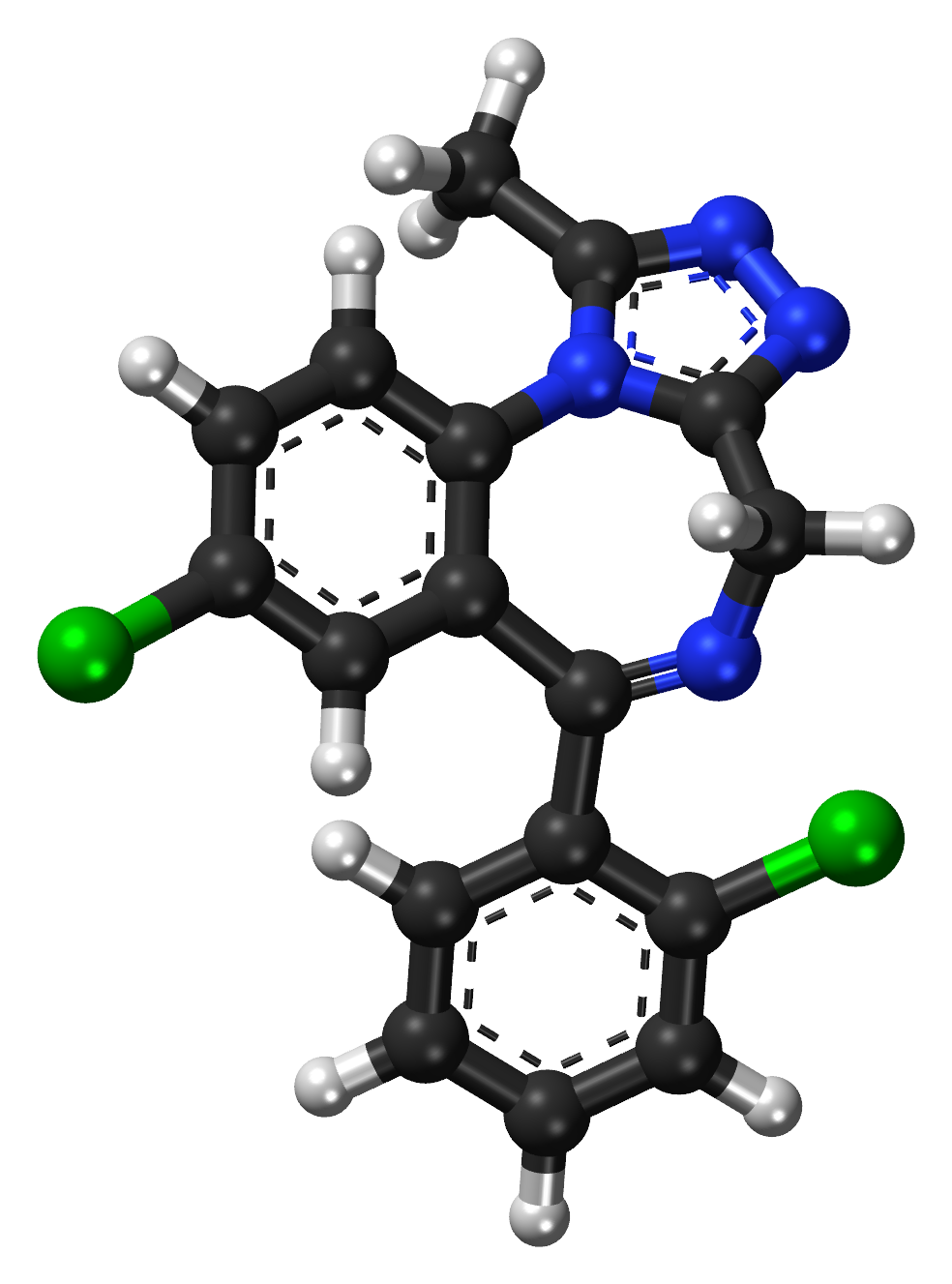

Clinical data
- Trade names: Halcion, others
- AHFS/Drugs.com: Monograph
- MedlinePlus: a684004
- License data: US DailyMed: Triazolam
- Pregnancy category: AU: C
- Routes of administration: By mouth
- ATC code: N05CD05 (WHO)

Legal status
- Legal status: AU: S4 (Prescription only); BR: Class B1 (Psychoactive drugs); CA: Schedule IV; DE: Prescription only (Anlage III for higher doses); NZ: Class C5 (discontinued); UK: Class C; US: Schedule IV; UN: N IV; SE: Förteckning IV In general: ℞ (Prescription only)

Pharmacokinetic data
- Bioavailability: 44% (oral route), 53% (sublingual)
- Metabolism: Liver
- Onset of action: 15–30 minutes
- Elimination half-life: 1.5–5.5 hours
- Excretion: Kidney

Identifiers
- IUPAC name: 8-Chloro-6-(2-chlorophenyl)-1-methyl-4H-[1,2,4]triazolo[4,3-a][1,4]benzodiazepine
- CAS Number: 28911-01-5
- PubChem CID: 5556
- IUPHAR/BPS: 7313
- DrugBank: DB00897
- ChemSpider: 5355
- UNII: 1HM943223R
- KEGG: D00387
- ChEBI: CHEBI:9674
- ChEMBL: ChEMBL646
- CompTox Dashboard (EPA): DTXSID6046763
- ECHA InfoCard: 100.044.811

Chemical and physical data
- Formula: C_{17}H_{12}Cl_{2}N_{4}
- Molar mass: 343.21 g·mol^{−1}
- 3D model (JSmol): Interactive image
- SMILES: Cc1nnc2n1-c1ccc(Cl)cc1C(c1ccccc1Cl)=NC2
- InChI: InChI=1S/C17H12Cl2N4/c1-10-21-22-16-9-20-17(12-4-2-3-5-14(12)19)13-8-11(18)6-7-15(13)23(10)16/h2-8H,9H2,1H3; Key:JOFWLTCLBGQGBO-UHFFFAOYSA-N

Triazolam, sold under the brand name Halcion among others, is a central nervous system (CNS) depressant tranquilizer of the triazolobenzodiazepine (TBZD) class, which are benzodiazepine (BZD) derivatives. It possesses pharmacological properties similar to those of other benzodiazepines, but it is generally only used as a sedative to treat severe insomnia. In addition to the hypnotic properties, triazolam's amnesic, anxiolytic, sedative, anticonvulsant, and muscle relaxant properties are pronounced as well.

Triazolam was initially patented in 1970 and went on sale in the United States in 1982. In 2017, it was the 289th most commonly prescribed medication in the United States, with more than one million prescriptions.

== Medical uses ==
Triazolam is usually used for short-term treatment of acute insomnia and circadian rhythm sleep disorders, including jet lag. It is an ideal benzodiazepine for this use because of its fast onset of action and short half-life. It puts a person to sleep for about 1.5 hours, allowing its user to avoid morning drowsiness. Triazolam is also sometimes used as an adjuvant in medical procedures requiring anesthesia or to reduce anxiety during brief events, such as MRI scans and nonsurgical dental procedures. Triazolam is ineffective in maintaining sleep due to its short half-life, with quazepam showing superiority.

Triazolam is frequently prescribed as a sleep aid for passengers travelling on short- to medium-duration flights. If this use is contemplated, the user avoiding the consumption of alcohol is especially important, as is trying a ground-based "rehearsal" of the medication to ensure that the side effects and potency of this medication are understood by the user prior to using it in a relatively more public environment (as disinhibition can be a common side effect, with potentially severe consequences). Triazolam causes anterograde amnesia, which is why so many dentists administer it to patients undergoing even minor dental procedures. This practice is known as sedation dentistry.

== Side effects ==
Adverse drug reactions associated with the use of triazolam include:

- Relatively common (>1% of patients): somnolence, dizziness, lightheadedness, coordination problems
- Less common (0.9% to 0.5% of patients): euphoria, tachycardia, fatigue, delirium, memory impairment, cramps/pain, depression, visual disturbances
- Rare (<0.5% of patients): constipation, taste alteration, diarrhea, dry mouth, dermatitis/allergy, abnormal dreams or nightmares, insomnia (paradoxical), paresthesia, tinnitus, dysesthesia, weakness, nasal/sinus congestion

Triazolam, although a short-acting benzodiazepine, may cause residual impairment into the next day, especially the next morning. A meta-analysis demonstrated that residual "hangover" effects after nighttime administration of triazolam such as sleepiness, psychomotor impairment, and diminished cognitive functions may persist into the next day, which may impair the ability of users to drive safely and increase risks of falls and hip fractures. Confusion and amnesia have been reported. Triazolam use can shift the circadian cycle.

In September 2020, the US Food and Drug Administration (FDA) required the boxed warning be updated for all benzodiazepine medicines to describe the risks of abuse, misuse, addiction, physical dependence, and withdrawal reactions consistently across all the medicines in the class.

=== Tolerance, dependence, and withdrawal ===
A review of the literature found that long-term use of benzodiazepines, including triazolam, is associated with drug tolerance, drug dependence, rebound insomnia, and CNS-related adverse effects. Benzodiazepine hypnotics should be used at their lowest possible dose and for a short period of time. Nonpharmacological treatment options were found to yield sustained improvements in sleep quality. A worsening of insomnia (rebound insomnia) compared to baseline may occur after discontinuation of triazolam, even following short-term, single-dose therapy.

Other withdrawal symptoms can range from mild unpleasant feelings to a major withdrawal syndrome, including stomach cramps, vomiting, muscle cramps, sweating, tremor, and in rare cases, convulsions.

=== Contraindications ===
Benzodiazepines require special precautions if used in the elderly, during pregnancy, in children, in alcoholics, or in other drug-dependent individuals and individuals with comorbid psychiatric disorders. Triazolam belongs to the Pregnancy Category X of the FDA. It is known to have the potential to cause birth defects.

=== Elderly ===
Triazolam, similar to other benzodiazepines and nonbenzodiazepines, causes impairments in body balance and standing steadiness. Falls and hip fractures are frequently reported, especially by elderly persons. The combination with alcohol increases these impairments. Partial, but incomplete tolerance develops to these impairments. Daytime withdrawal effects can occur.

An extensive review of the medical literature regarding the management of insomnia and the elderly found considerable evidence of the effectiveness and durability of nondrug treatments for insomnia in adults of all ages and that these interventions are underused. Compared with the benzodiazepines including triazolam, the nonbenzodiazepine sedative-hypnotics appeared to offer few, if any, significant clinical advantages in efficacy or tolerability in elderly persons. Newer agents with novel mechanisms of action and improved safety profiles, such as the melatonin agonists, hold promise for the management of chronic insomnia in elderly people. Long-term use of sedative-hypnotics for insomnia lacks an evidence base and has traditionally been discouraged for reasons that include concerns about such potential adverse drug effects as cognitive impairment, anterograde amnesia, daytime sedation, motor incoordination, and increased risk of motor vehicle accidents and falls. One study found no evidence of sustained hypnotic efficacy throughout the 9 weeks of treatment for triazolam.

In addition, the effectiveness and safety of long-term use of these agents remain to be determined. More research is needed to evaluate the long-term effects of treatment and the most appropriate management strategy for elderly persons with chronic insomnia.

== Interactions ==
Ketoconazole and itraconazole have a profound effect on the pharmacokinetics of triazolam, leading to greatly enhanced effects. Anxiety, tremor, and depression have been documented in a case report following administration of nitrazepam and triazolam. Following administration of erythromycin, repetitive hallucinations and abnormal bodily sensations developed. The patient had, however, acute pneumonia, and kidney failure. Co-administration of benzodiazepine drugs at therapeutic doses with erythromycin may cause serious psychotic symptoms, especially in those with other physical complications. Caffeine reduces the effectiveness of triazolam. Other important interactions include cimetidine, diltiazem, fluconazole, grapefruit juice, isoniazid, itraconazole, nefazodone, rifampicin, ritonavir, and troleandomycin. Triazolam should not be administered to patients on efavirenz/emtricitabine/tenofovir (Atripla).

== Overdose ==
Symptoms of an overdose include:

- Coma
- Hypoventilation (respiratory depression)
- Somnolence (drowsiness)
- Slurred speech
- Seizures

Death can occur from triazolam overdose, but is more likely to occur in combination with other depressant drugs such as opioids, alcohol, or tricyclic antidepressants.

== Pharmacology ==
Like other benzodiazepines, triazolam enhances the inhibitory effects of the neurotransmitter GABA by binding to the allosteric benzodiazepine receptor on GABA_{A} receptor complexes.

Triazolam is short-acting, is lipophilic, and is metabolized hepatically via oxidative pathways. Triazolam produces one short-acting active metabolite, alpha-hydroxytriazolam, which is suspected to be of minor clinical significance. The half-life of triazolam is only 2 hours making it a very short acting benzodiazepine drug. It has anticonvulsant effects on brain function.

== Society and culture ==
=== Recreational use ===
Triazolam, like other benzodiazepines, is susceptible to misuse and abuse. Its rapid onset of action and short half-life contribute to its abuse potential, but its relative obscurity compared to other fast-acting benzodiazepines (such as alprazolam or lorazepam) prevent its abuse from becoming particularly commonplace. Likewise, because it is not prescribed as often or as readily as alprazolam or lorazepam, there is less triazolam available to be diverted for recreational use.

=== Legal status ===
Its use at low doses has been deemed acceptable by the US FDA and in several other countries.

Triazolam is a Schedule IV drug under the Convention on Psychotropic Substances and the US Controlled Substances Act.

=== Brand names ===
The drug is marketed in English-speaking countries under the brand names Apo-Triazo, Halcion, Hypam, and Trilam. Other names include 2'-chloroxanax, chloroxanax, triclazolam, and chlorotriazolam.

== See also ==
- Temazepam
