= Alprazolam =

Benzodiazepine medication

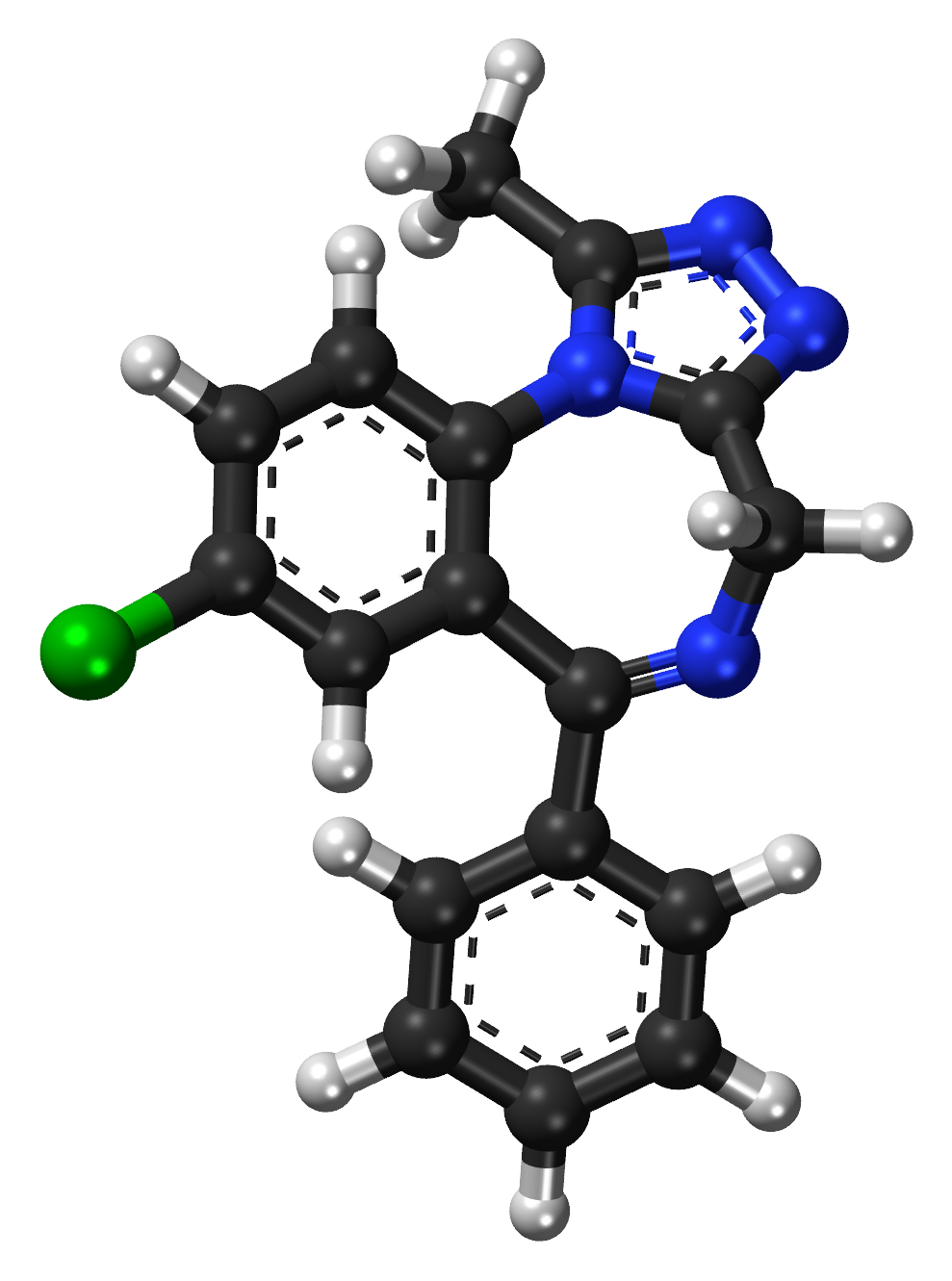

Clinical data
- Pronunciation: /ælˈpræzəlæm/ or /ælˈpreɪzəlæm/
- Trade names: Xanax, others
- AHFS/Drugs.com: Monograph
- MedlinePlus: a684001
- License data: US DailyMed: Alprazolam
- Pregnancy category: AU: C
- Dependence liability: Very high
- Addiction liability: High
- Routes of administration: By mouth
- Drug class: Benzodiazepine
- ATC code: N05BA12 (WHO)

Legal status
- Legal status: AU: S8 (Controlled drug); BR: Class B1 (Psychoactive drugs); CA: Schedule IV Targeted (CDSA IV); DE: Anlage III (Special prescription form required) (in doses higher than 1 mg); NZ: Class C5; UK: POM (Prescription only) / Class C; US: Schedule IV; UN: Psychotropic Schedule IV; EU: Rx-only; SE: Förteckning IV In general: Prescription only

Pharmacokinetic data
- Bioavailability: 80–90%
- Protein binding: 80%
- Metabolism: Liver, via cytochrome P450 3A4
- Metabolites: α-hydroxyalprazolam; 4-hydroxyalprazolam
- Onset of action: 30–60 minutes
- Elimination half-life: IR dosing: 11–13 hours; ER dosing: 11–16 hours
- Duration of action: IR dosing: 6 hours; ER dosing: 11.3 hours
- Excretion: Kidney

Identifiers
- IUPAC name: 8-Chloro-1-methyl-6-phenyl-4H-[1,2,4]triazolo[4,3-a][1,4]benzodiazepine
- CAS Number: 28981-97-7
- PubChem CID: 2118
- IUPHAR/BPS: 7111
- DrugBank: DB00404
- ChemSpider: 2034
- UNII: YU55MQ3IZY
- KEGG: D00225
- ChEBI: CHEBI:2611
- ChEMBL: ChEMBL661
- CompTox Dashboard (EPA): DTXSID4022577
- ECHA InfoCard: 100.044.849

Chemical and physical data
- Formula: C_{17}H_{13}ClN_{4}
- Molar mass: 308.77 g·mol^{−1}
- 3D model (JSmol): Interactive image
- SMILES: Cc1nnc2n1-c1ccc(Cl)cc1C(c1ccccc1)=NC2
- InChI: InChI=1S/C17H13ClN4/c1-11-20-21-16-10-19-17(12-5-3-2-4-6-12)14-9-13(18)7-8-15(14)22(11)16/h2-9H,10H2,1H3; Key:VREFGVBLTWBCJP-UHFFFAOYSA-N

Alprazolam, sold under the brand name Xanax among others, is a fast-acting, potent tranquilizer of moderate duration within the triazolobenzodiazepine group of chemicals called benzodiazepines. Alprazolam is most commonly prescribed in the management of anxiety disorders, especially panic disorder and generalized anxiety disorder (GAD). Other uses include the treatment of chemotherapy-induced nausea, together with other treatments. Alprazolam is generally taken orally.

Common side effects include sleepiness, depression, suppressed emotions, mild to severe decreases in motor skills, hiccups, dulling or declining of cognition, decreased alertness, dry mouth (mildly), decreased heart rate, impairment of judgment (usually in higher than therapeutic doses), and decreased memory formation, depending on dosage. Some of the sedation and drowsiness may improve within a few days.

Benzodiazepine withdrawal symptoms may occur if use is suddenly decreased.

Alprazolam was developed by Jackson Hester Jr. at the Upjohn Company and patented in 1971 and approved for medical use in the United States in 1981. Alprazolam is a Schedule IV controlled substance and is a common drug of abuse. It is available as a generic medication. In 2023, it was the 37th most commonly prescribed medication in the United States, with more than 15 million prescriptions.

== Medical uses ==
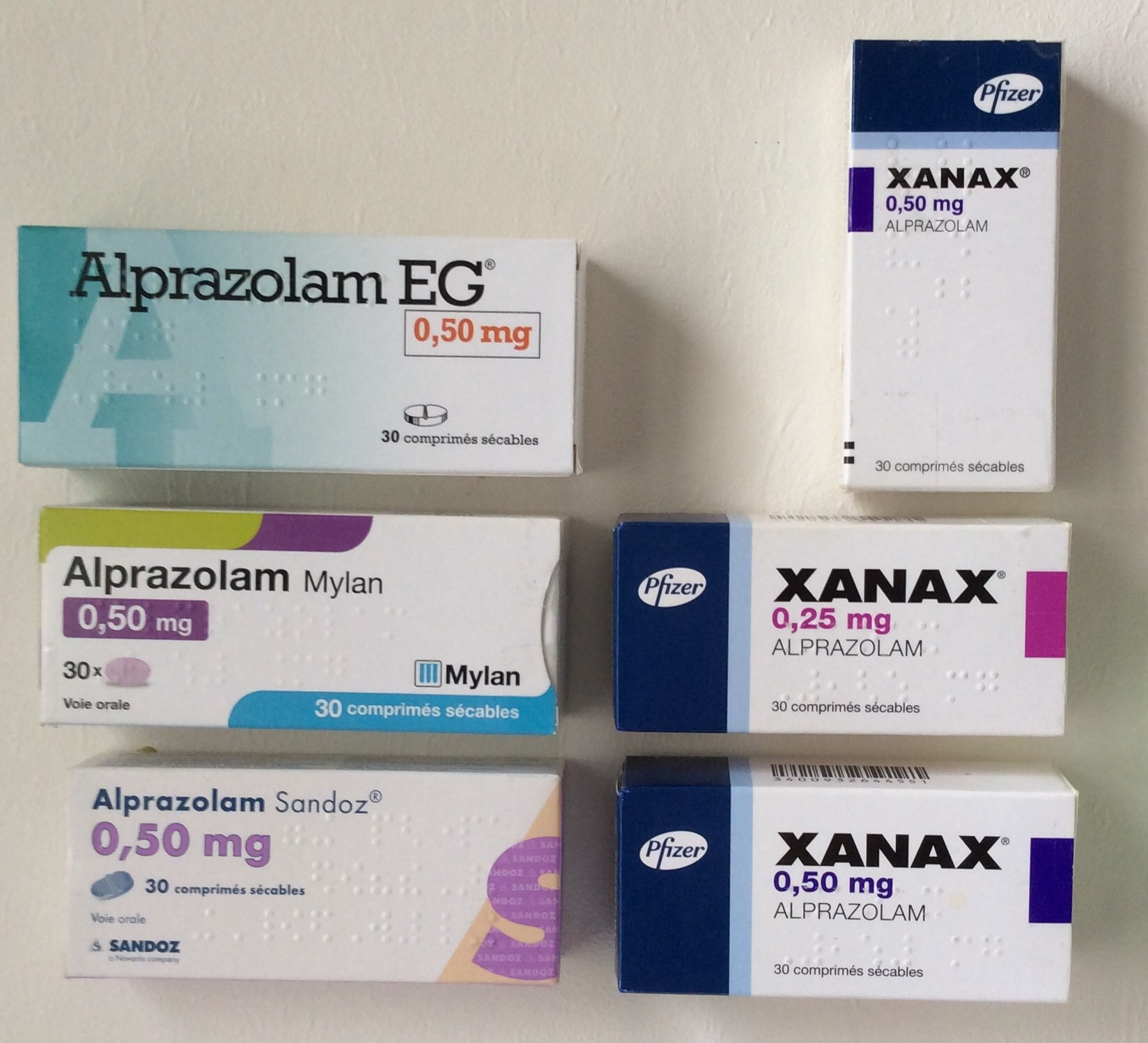
Alprazolam pills in boxes, as sold in France; both the original Pfizer brand product Xanax and various generic forms of alprazolam are depicted here.

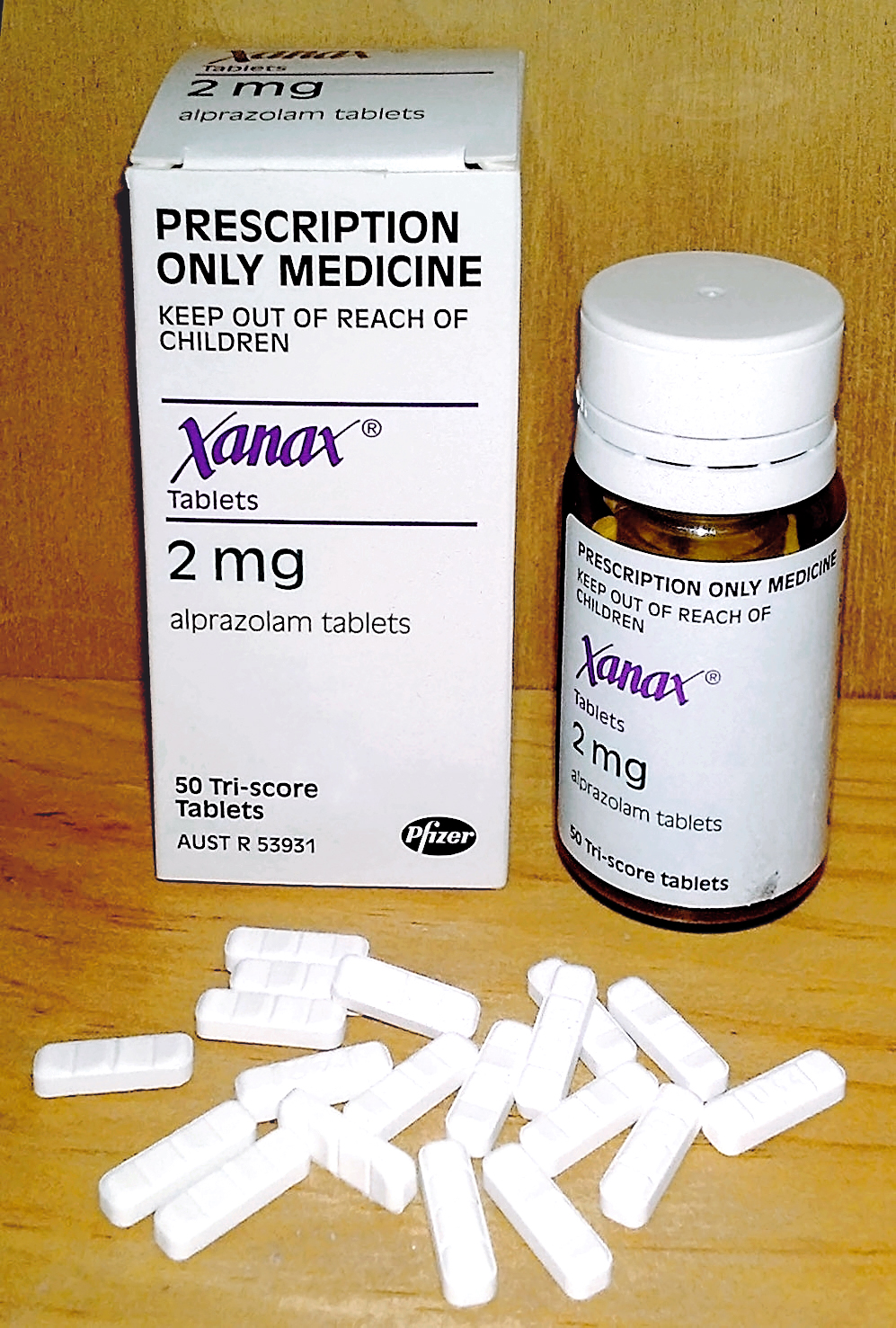
A prescription bottle of Xanax

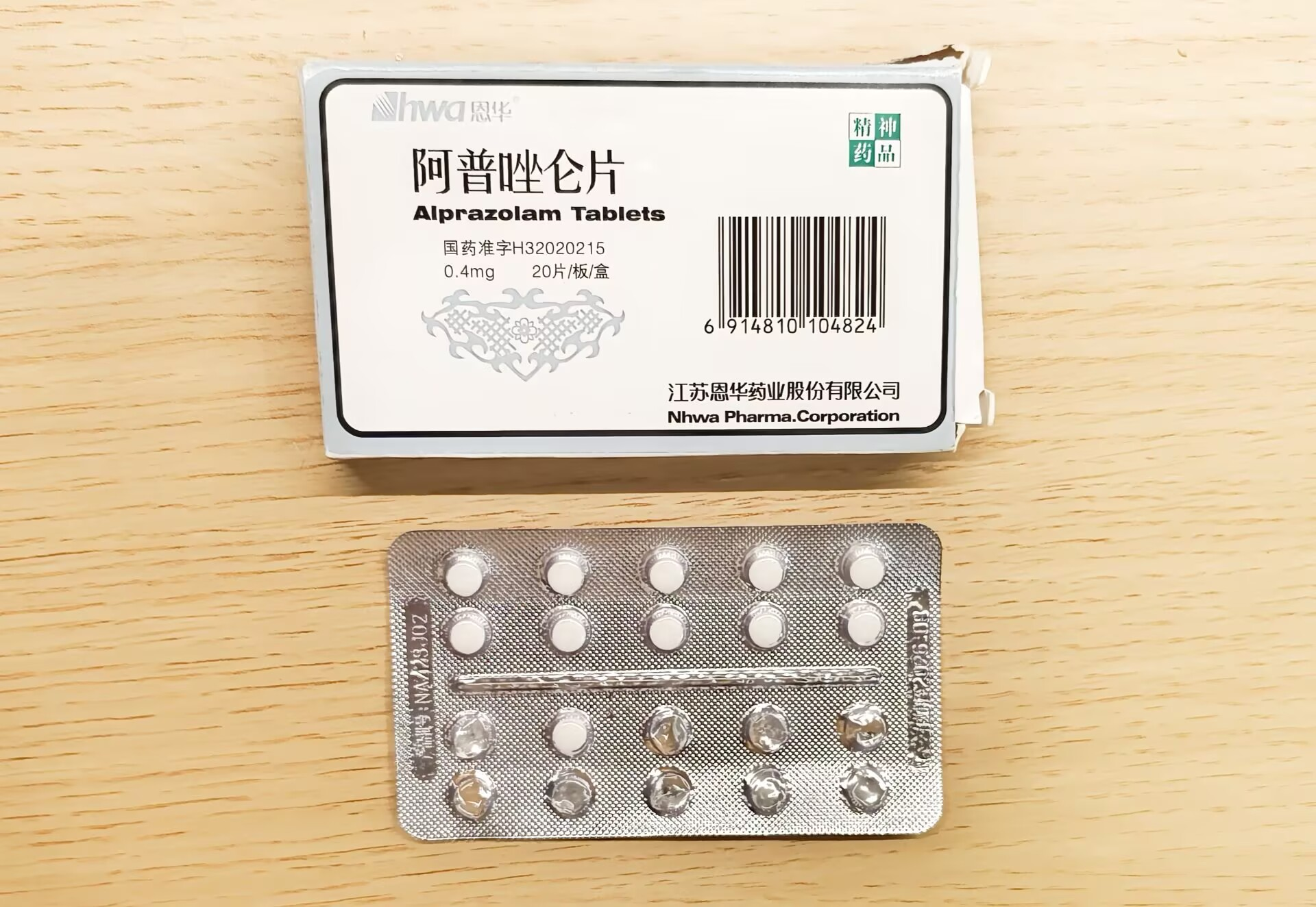
Alprazolam tablets sold in China

Alprazolam is used in the management of anxiety disorders and nausea due to chemotherapy. Alprazolam is indicated for the treatment of generalized anxiety disorder (GAD) and panic disorder with or without agoraphobia in adults.

=== Panic disorder ===
Alprazolam is effective in the relief of moderate to severe anxiety and panic attacks. In Australia, alprazolam is not recommended for the treatment of panic disorder because of concerns regarding tolerance, dependence, and abuse. Most evidence shows that the benefits of alprazolam in treating panic disorder last only four to ten weeks. However, people with panic disorder have been treated on an open basis for up to eight months without apparent loss of benefit.

Alprazolam is recommended by the World Federation of Societies of Biological Psychiatry (WFSBP) for treatment-resistant cases of panic disorder where there is no history of tolerance or dependence.

A 2023 meta-analysis of published and unpublished FDA-submitted regulatory trials of alprazolam extended-release for panic disorder found that only one of five clinical trials showed a positive efficacy outcome (20%), while the rest were negative and did not demonstrate effectiveness. In the published literature, three trials were published conveying a positive outcome (100%), but of these, only one was positive and the other two were considered to have been inappropriately spun as positive. The effect size (Hedges's g) of alprazolam extended-release for the treatment of panic disorder based on the five clinical trials was 0.33 (a small effect) and based on the published trials was 0.47 (a moderate effect), equating to an increase of 0.14 or 42%. The authors concluded that publication bias substantially inflated the effectiveness of alprazolam extended-release for panic disorder.

=== Anxiety disorders ===
Anxiety associated with depression is responsive to alprazolam. Clinical studies have shown that the effectiveness is limited to four months for anxiety disorders. However, the research into antidepressant properties of alprazolam is poor and has only assessed its short-term effects against depression. In one study, some long term, high-dosage users of alprazolam developed reversible depression.

In the US, alprazolam is indicated for the treatment of generalized anxiety disorder and panic disorder with or without agoraphobia.

In the UK, alprazolam is indicated for short-term symptomatic treatment of anxiety in adults.

=== Chemotherapy-induced nausea and vomiting ===
Alprazolam may be used in combination with other medications for chemotherapy-induced nausea and vomiting.

== Contraindications ==
Benzodiazepines require special precaution if used in children and in alcohol- or other drug-dependent individuals. Particular care should be taken in pregnant or elderly people, people with substance use disorder history, particularly alcohol dependence, and people with comorbid psychiatric disorders.

Alprazolam should be avoided or carefully monitored by medical professionals in individuals with myasthenia gravis, acute narrow-angle glaucoma, severe liver deficiencies such as cirrhosis, severe sleep apnea, pre-existing respiratory depression, marked neuromuscular respiratory, acute pulmonary insufficiency, chronic psychosis, hypersensitivity, allergy to alprazolam or other benzodiazepines, and borderline personality disorder, where it may induce suicidality and dyscontrol.

Like all central nervous system depressants, alprazolam in larger-than-normal doses can cause significant deterioration in alertness and increase drowsiness, especially in those unaccustomed to the drug's effects.

== Side effects ==
Side effects from alprazolam

Sedative drugs, including alprazolam, have been associated with an increased risk of death.

Possible side effects include:

- Anterograde amnesia
- Concentration problems
- Ataxia
- Dysarthria
- Disinhibition
- Drowsiness, dizziness, lightheadedness, fatigue, ataxia, and vertigo
- Dry mouth (infrequent)
- Hallucinations (rare)
- Jaundice (very rare)
- Seizure (less common)
- Skin rash
- Respiratory depression
- Constipation
- Suicidal ideation or suicide
- Urinary retention (infrequent)
- Muscle weakness

In September 2020, the US Food and Drug Administration (FDA) required that boxed warnings for all benzodiazepine medications be updated to describe the risks of abuse, misuse, addiction, physical dependence, and withdrawal reactions consistently across all the medicines in the class.

=== Paradoxical reactions ===
Although unusual, the following paradoxical reactions have been shown to occur:

- Aggression
- Mania, agitation, hyperactivity, and restlessness
- Rage and hostility
- Twitches and tremor

=== Pregnancy and breastfeeding ===
Benzodiazepines cross the placenta, enter the fetus, and are also excreted in breast milk.

The use of alprazolam during pregnancy is associated with congenital abnormalities, and use in the last trimester may cause fetal drug dependence and withdrawal symptoms in the post-natal period as well as neonatal flaccidity and respiratory problems. However, in long-term users of benzodiazepines, abrupt discontinuation due to concerns of teratogenesis has a high risk of causing extreme withdrawal symptoms and a severe rebound effect of the underlying mental health disorder. Spontaneous abortions may also result from abrupt withdrawal of psychotropic medications, including benzodiazepines.

=== Overdose ===
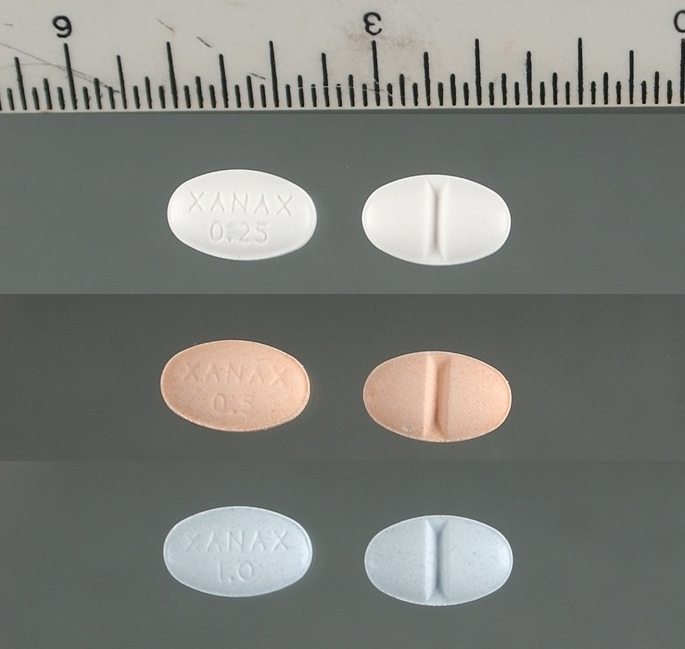
Xanax 0.25 mg (top row), 0.5 mg (middle row), and 1 mg (bottom row) tablets

The maximum recommended daily dose is 10 milligrams per day.

Overdoses of alprazolam can be mild to severe depending on the quantity ingested and if other drugs are taken in combination.

Alprazolam overdoses cause excess central nervous system (CNS) depression.

=== Dependence and withdrawal ===
The potential for misuse among those taking it for medical reasons is controversial, with some expert reviews stating that the risk is low and similar to that of other benzodiazepine drugs. Others state that there is a substantial risk of misuse and dependence in both patients and non-medical users and that the short half-life and rapid onset of action may increase the risk of misuse. Compared to the large number of prescriptions, relatively few individuals increase their dose on their own initiative or engage in drug-seeking behavior.

Alprazolam, like other benzodiazepines, binds specifically on an allosteric site on the GABAA receptor. Long-term use causes adaptive changes in the benzodiazepine receptors, making them less sensitive to stimulation and thus making the drugs less potent.

Withdrawal and rebound symptoms commonly occur and necessitate a gradual reduction in dosage to minimize withdrawal effects when discontinuing.

Not all withdrawal effects are evidence of true dependence or withdrawal. Recurrence of symptoms such as anxiety may simply indicate that the drug was having its expected anti-anxiety effect and that, in the absence of the drug, the symptom has returned to pretreatment levels. If the symptoms are more severe or frequent, the person may be experiencing a rebound effect due to the removal of the drug. Either of these can occur without the person actually being drug dependent.

Alprazolam and other benzodiazepines may also cause the development of physical dependence, tolerance, and benzodiazepine withdrawal symptoms during rapid dose reduction or cessation of therapy after long-term treatment. There is a higher chance of withdrawal reactions if the drug is administered in a higher dosage than recommended, or if a person stops taking the medication altogether without slowly allowing the body to adjust to a lower-dosage regimen.

In 1992, Romach and colleagues reported that dose escalation is not a characteristic of long-term alprazolam users and that the majority of long-term alprazolam users change their initial pattern of regular use to one of symptom control only when required.

Some common symptoms of alprazolam discontinuation include malaise, weakness, insomnia, tachycardia, lightheadedness, and dizziness.

Those taking more than 4 mg per day have an increased potential for dependence. This medication may cause withdrawal symptoms upon abrupt withdrawal or rapid tapering, which in some cases have been known to cause seizures, as well as marked delirium similar to that produced by the anticholinergic tropane alkaloids of Datura (scopolamine and atropine). The discontinuation of this medication may also cause rebound anxiety.

In a 1983 study, only 5% of patients who abruptly ceased taking long-acting benzodiazepines after less than eight months demonstrated withdrawal symptoms, but 43% who had been taking them for more than eight months did. With alprazolam, a short-acting benzodiazepine, taken for eight weeks, 65% of patients experienced significant rebound anxiety. To some degree, these older benzodiazepines are self-tapering.

The benzodiazepines diazepam and oxazepam have been found to produce fewer withdrawal reactions than alprazolam, temazepam, or lorazepam. Factors that determine the risk of psychological dependence or physical dependence and the severity of the benzodiazepine withdrawal symptoms during dose reduction of alprazolam include: dosage used, length of use, frequency of dosing, personality characteristics of the individual, previous use of cross-dependent/cross-tolerant drugs (alcohol or other sedative-hypnotic drugs), current use of cross-dependent/-tolerant drugs, use of other short-acting, high-potency benzodiazepines, and method of discontinuation.

== Interactions ==
Alprazolam is primarily metabolized via CYP3A4. Combining CYP3A4 inhibitors such as cimetidine, erythromycin, norfluoxetine, fluvoxamine, itraconazole, ketoconazole, nefazodone, propoxyphene, and ritonavir delay the hepatic clearance of alprazolam, which may result in its accumulation and increased severity of its side effects.

Imipramine and desipramine have been reported to increase an average of 31% and 20% respectively by the concomitant administration of alprazolam tablets. Combined oral contraceptive pills reduce the clearance of alprazolam, which may lead to increased plasma levels of alprazolam and accumulation.

Alcohol is one of the most common interactions; alcohol and alprazolam taken in combination have a synergistic effect on one another, which can cause severe sedation, behavioral changes, and intoxication. The more alcohol and alprazolam taken, the worse the interaction. Similarly, the use of prescribed or illicit opioids with alprazolam can cause life-threatening respiratory depression. Combination of alprazolam with the herb kava can result in the development of a semi-comatose state. Plants in the genus Hypericum, including St. John's wort, conversely can lower the plasma levels of alprazolam and reduce its therapeutic effect.

== Pharmacology ==
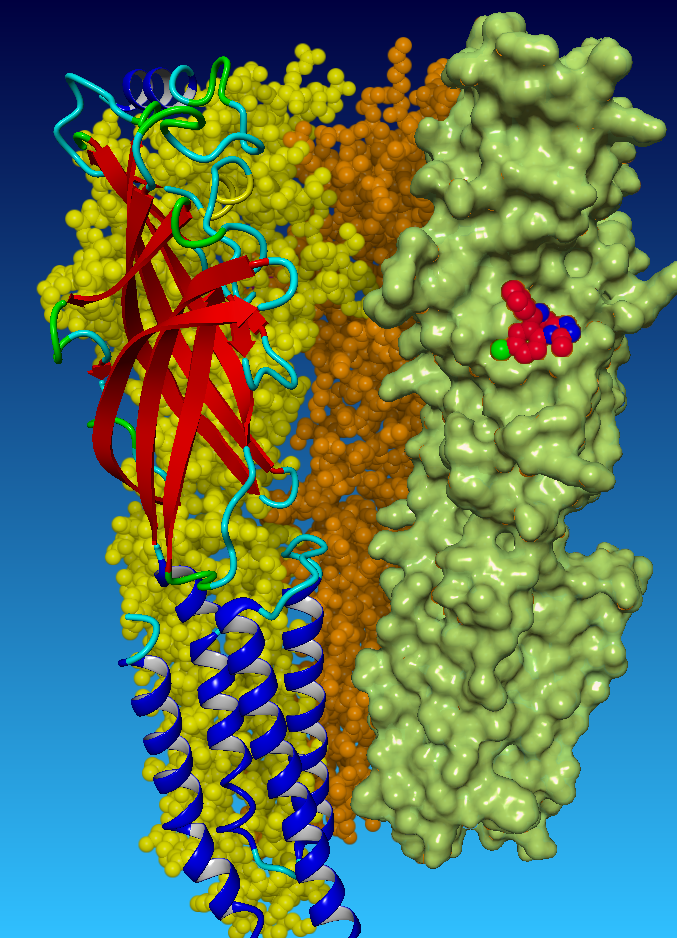
Alprazolam binds at the α1β3γ2 GABA_{A} receptor. Alprazolam with red space-filling carbon atoms. γ2 receptor subunit in mint green. The α1' subunit is hidden.

Alprazolam is a GABA_{A} receptor positive allosteric modulator. When it binds to the receptor, effects of GABA are enhanced, leading to inhibition of neurons in the brain. This results in effects including reduced anxiety, muscle relaxant, and anticonvulsant activity. The activity of alprazolam in the central nervous system is dose-dependent.

=== Mechanism of action ===
Alprazolam is classed as a high-potency triazolobenzodiazepine: a benzodiazepine with a triazole ring attached to its structure. As a benzodiazepine, alprazolam produces a variety of therapeutic and adverse effects by binding to the GABA_{A} benzodiazepine receptor site and modulating its function; GABA receptors are the most prolific inhibitory receptor within the brain. The GABA chemical and receptor system mediates the inhibitory or calming effects of alprazolam on the nervous system. The binding of alprazolam to the GABA_{A} receptor, a chloride ion channel, enhances the effects of GABA, a neurotransmitter. When GABA binds the GABA_{A} receptor the channel opens and chloride enters the cell which makes it more resistant to depolarisation. Therefore, alprazolam has a depressant effect on synaptic transmission to reduce anxiety.

The GABA_{A} receptor is made up of 5 subunits out of a possible 19, and GABA_{A} receptors made up of different combinations of subunits have different properties, different locations within the brain, and, importantly, different activities with regard to benzodiazepines. Alprazolam and other triazolobenzodiazepines such as triazolam that have a triazole ring fused to their diazepine ring appear to have antidepressant properties. This is perhaps due to the similarities shared with tricyclic antidepressants, as they have two benzene rings fused to a diazepine ring. Alprazolam causes a marked suppression of the hypothalamic–pituitary–adrenal axis. The therapeutic properties of alprazolam are similar to other benzodiazepines and include anxiolytic, anticonvulsant, muscle relaxant, hypnotic, and amnesic; however, it is used mainly as an anxiolytic.

Giving alprazolam, as compared to lorazepam, has been demonstrated to elicit a statistically significant increase in extracellular dopamine D_{1} and D_{2} concentrations in the striatum.

=== Pharmacokinetics ===
Alprazolam metabolized into 4-hydroxyalprazolam (top) and α-hydroxyalprazolam (bottom)

Alprazolam is taken orally, and is absorbed well – 80% of alprazolam binds to proteins in the serum (the majority binding to albumin). The concentration of alprazolam peaks after one to two hours.

Alprazolam is metabolized in the liver, mostly by the cytochrome enzyme CYP3A4. Two major metabolites are produced: 4-hydroxyalprazolam and α-hydroxyalprazolam, as well as an inactive benzophenone. The low concentrations and low potencies of 4-hydroxyalprazolam and α-hydroxyalprazolam indicate that they have little to no contribution to the effects of alprazolam.

The metabolites and some unmetabolized alprazolam are filtered out by the kidneys and are excreted in the urine.

== Chemistry ==
=== Physical properties ===
Alprazolam is a triazole and benzodiazepine derivative substituted with a phenyl group at position 6, with a chlorine atom at position 8, and with a methyl group at position 1. It is an analogue of triazolam, the difference between them being the absence of a chlorine atom in the ortho position of the phenyl ring. It is slightly soluble in chloroform, soluble in alcohol, slightly soluble in acetone and insoluble in water. It has a melting point of 228–229.5 °C (442.4–445.1 °F; 501.1–502.6 K).

=== Synthesis ===
For the synthesis of alprazolam the same method can be used as for triazolam, except that it starts from 2-amino-5-chlorobenzophenone. However, an alternative easier synthesis starting with 2,6-dichloro-4-phenylquinoline has been suggested, in which it reacts with hydrazine giving 6-chloro-2-hydrazino-4-phenylquinoline. Boiling the mixture with triethyl orthoacetate results in cyclization with the formation of the triazole ring. The product undergoes oxidative degradation in the presence of periodate and ruthenium dioxide in acetone solution, giving 2-[4-(3'-methyl-1,2,4-triazolo)]-5-chlorobenzophenone. Oxy-methylation with formaldehyde results in a product that is treated with phosphorus tribromide when 2-[4-(3'-methyl-5'-bromomethyl-1,2,4-triazolo)]-5-chlorobenzophenone is obtained. By substituting the bromine atom with an amino group conferred by ammonia, it forms alprazolam triazolobenzophenone, following which an intramolecular heterocyclization takes place to obtain alprazolam.

=== Detection ===
Quantification of alprazolam in blood and plasma samples may be necessary to confirm a diagnosis of intoxication in hospitalized patients, or to provide evidence in the case of crimes e.g., impaired driving arrest, or to assist in a thorough forensic investigation, e.g., in a medicolegal death investigation. Blood or plasma alprazolam concentrations are usually in a range of 10–100 μg/L in persons receiving the drug therapeutically, 100–300 μg/L in those arrested for impaired driving, and 300–2,000 μg/L in victims of acute overdosage. Most of the commercial immunoassays used for the benzodiazepine class of drugs cross-react with alprazolam, but confirmation and quantitative determination are usually done by chromatographic techniques.

== Dosage forms ==
Alprazolam regular release and orally disintegrating tablets are available as 0.25 mg, 0.5 mg, 1 mg, and 2 mg tablets. Extended-release tablets are available as 0.5 mg, 1 mg, 2 mg, and 3 mg tablets. Liquid alprazolam is available in a 1 mg/mL oral concentrate.

== Legal status ==
Alprazolam has varied legal status depending on jurisdiction:

- In the United States, alprazolam is a prescription drug and is assigned to Schedule IV of the Controlled Substances Act by the Drug Enforcement Administration (DEA).
- Under the UK drug misuse classification system, alprazolam is a Class C drug. In the UK, alprazolam is not available on the National Health Service (NHS) and can only be obtained on a private prescription.
- In Ireland, alprazolam is a Schedule 4 medicine.
- In Sweden, alprazolam is a prescription drug in List IV (Schedule 4) under the Narcotics Drugs Act (1968).
- In the Netherlands, alprazolam is a List 2 substance of the Opium Law and is available for prescription.
- In Germany, alprazolam can be prescribed normally in doses up to 1 mg. Higher doses are scheduled as Anlage III narcotic drugs and require a special prescription form.
- In Australia, alprazolam, as of February 2014, is a Schedule 8 medication.
- In the Philippines, alprazolam is legally classified as a "dangerous drug" under the Comprehensive Dangerous Drugs Act of 2002, along with other schedule drugs listed in the 1971 Convention on Psychotropic Substances. The importation of dangerous drugs including alprazolam, requires authorization from the Philippine Drug Enforcement Agency.

Internationally, alprazolam is included under the United Nations Convention on Psychotropic Substances as Schedule IV.

== Availability ==
In December 2013, in anticipation of the rescheduling of alprazolam to Schedule 8 in Australia, Pfizer Australia announced they would be discontinuing the Xanax brand in Australia as it was no longer commercially viable.

== Recreational use ==
There is a risk of misuse and dependence in both patients and non-medical users of alprazolam; alprazolam's high affinity binding, high potency, and rapid onset increase its abuse potential. The physical dependence and withdrawal syndrome of alprazolam also add to its addictive nature. In the small subgroup of individuals who escalate their doses, there is usually a history of alcohol or other substance use disorders.

Despite this, most prescribed alprazolam users do not use their medication recreationally, and the long-term use of benzodiazepines does not generally correlate with the need for dose escalation. However, based on US findings from the Treatment Episode Data Set (TEDS), an annual compilation of patient characteristics in substance abuse treatment facilities in the United States, admissions due to "primary tranquilizer" (including, but not limited to, benzodiazepine-type) drug use increased 79% from 1992 to 2002, suggesting that misuse of benzodiazepines may be on the rise.

The Centers for Disease Control and Prevention (CDC) reported an 89 percent increase in emergency room visits nationwide related to nonmedical benzodiazepine use between 2004 and 2008.

Alprazolam is one of the most commonly prescribed and misused benzodiazepines in the United States. A large-scale nationwide U.S. government study conducted by the Substance Abuse and Mental Health Services Administration concluded that, in the US, benzodiazepines are recreationally the most frequently used pharmaceuticals due to their widespread availability, accounting for 35% of all drug-related visits to hospital emergency and urgent care facilities. Men and women are equally likely to use benzodiazepines recreationally. The report found that alprazolam is the most common benzodiazepine for recreational use, followed by clonazepam, lorazepam, and diazepam. The number of emergency department visits due to benzodiazepines increased by 36% between 2004 and 2006.

Regarding the significant increases detected, it is worthwhile to consider that the number of pharmaceuticals dispensed for legitimate therapeutic uses may be increasing over time, and DAWN estimates are not adjusted to take such increases into account. Nor do DAWN estimates take into account the increases in the population or ED use between 2004 and 2006.

Those at particularly high risk for misuse and dependence are people with a history of alcoholism or drug abuse and/or dependence and people with borderline personality disorder.

The poly-drug use of powerful depressant drugs poses the highest level of health concerns due to a significant increase in the likelihood of experiencing an overdose, which may cause fatal respiratory depression.

A 1990 study found that diazepam has a higher misuse potential relative to many other benzodiazepines and that some data suggest that alprazolam and lorazepam resemble diazepam in this respect.

Anecdotally, injection of alprazolam has been reported, causing dangerous damage to blood vessels, closure of blood vessels (embolization), and decay of muscle tissue (rhabdomyolysis). Alprazolam is not very soluble in water; when crushed in water, it does not fully dissolve (40 μg/ml of H_{2}O at pH 7). There are also reports of alprazolam being snorted. Due to the low weight of a dose, alprazolam, in one case, was distributed on blotter paper in a manner similar to LSD.

Misuse of alprazolam and other benzodiazepines has been shown to cause cognitive impairment. Alprazolam has typically caused anterograde amnesia effects (inability to recall new events), but a study conducted on mice by the Department of Pharmaceutical Sciences and Drug Research at Punjabi University has also determined that alprazolam can produce retrograde amnesic effects (inability to remember events occurring before amnesia). One 2016 study found that "chronic administration of alprazolam affects memory but attentive and psychomotor performance remained unaffected".

A 2016 randomized controlled trial stated that "overall, long-term benzodiazepine users may not be in their full cognitive state upon withdrawal". Similarly, a 2017 meta-analysis concluded that "a range of neuropsychological functions are impaired as a result of long-term benzodiazepine use, and that these are likely to persist even following withdrawal".

=== Slang terms ===
Slang terms for alprazolam vary by geographic location. Some of the more common terms are modified versions of the trade name "Xanax", such as Xannies (or Xanies) and the phonetic equivalent of Zannies; references to their drug classes, such as benzos or downers; or remark upon their shape or color (most commonly a straight, perforated tablet or an oval-shaped pill): bars, ladders, Xanbars, Xans, Z-bars, handlebars, beans, footballs, schoolbuses, planks, poles, sticks, blues, totem poles, or blue footballs.

== In popular culture ==
- Take Your Pills: Xanax, a 2022 Netflix documentary, provides an overview of the drug's history and usage.
