= Delucemine =

Chemical compound

Clinical data
- ATC code: none

Identifiers
- IUPAC name: 3,3-Bis(3-fluorophenyl)-N-methylpropan-1-amine
- CAS Number: 186495-49-8
- PubChem CID: 156421
- ChemSpider: 137745
- UNII: 124LSR3H2X
- ChEMBL: ChEMBL2106165
- CompTox Dashboard (EPA): DTXSID20171908

Chemical and physical data
- Formula: C_{16}H_{17}F_{2}N
- Molar mass: 261.316 g·mol^{−1}
- 3D model (JSmol): Interactive image
- SMILES: CNCCC(C1=CC(=CC=C1)F)C2=CC(=CC=C2)F
- InChI: InChI=1S/C16H17F2N/c1-19-9-8-16(12-4-2-6-14(17)10-12)13-5-3-7-15(18)11-13/h2-7,10-11,16,19H,8-9H2,1H3; Key:MUGNLPWYHGOJEG-UHFFFAOYSA-N

Delucemine (NPS-1506) is a drug which acts as an NMDA antagonist and a serotonin reuptake inhibitor, and has neuroprotective effects. It was originally investigated for the treatment of stroke and in 2004 was studied as a potential antidepressant.

== Origin ==
The structure of delucemine is based on argiotoxin 636, a NMDA antagonist isolated from the venom of Argiope aurantia.

== See also ==
- AD-1211
- Budipine
- Diphenidine
- Ephenidine
- Fluorolintane
- Lanicemine
- Methoxphenidine
- MT-45
- Remacemide
