= Budipine =

Pharmaceutical drug

Clinical data
- AHFS/Drugs.com: International Drug Names
- ATC code: N04BX03 (WHO)

Identifiers
- IUPAC name: 1-tert-butyl-4,4-diphenylpiperidine
- CAS Number: 57982-78-2
- PubChem CID: 68778
- ChemSpider: 62021
- UNII: L9026OPI2Z
- KEGG: D07306
- ChEMBL: ChEMBL334491
- CompTox Dashboard (EPA): DTXSID20206709
- ECHA InfoCard: 100.055.494

Chemical and physical data
- Formula: C_{21}H_{27}N
- Molar mass: 293.454 g·mol^{−1}
- 3D model (JSmol): Interactive image
- SMILES: c1(ccccc1)C3(c2ccccc2)CCN(C(C)(C)C)CC3
- InChI: InChI=1S/C21H27N/c1-20(2,3)22-16-14-21(15-17-22,18-10-6-4-7-11-18)19-12-8-5-9-13-19/h4-13H,14-17H2,1-3H3; Key:QIHLUZAFSSMXHQ-UHFFFAOYSA-N

Budipine (brand name Parkinsan) is an antiparkinson agent marketed for the treatment of Parkinson's disease.

While its exact mechanism of action is not well characterized, it is believed to be an NMDA receptor antagonist, but also promoting the synthesis of dopamine.

Because it provides additional benefits relative to existing treatments, it probably does not precisely mimic the mechanism of an existing known treatment.

It is an hERG blocker and can produce long QT syndrome as a side effect.

Analogues include prodipine and medipine.

== Synthesis ==
Budipine can be prepared from the 1-tert-butyl-4-piperidone [1465-76-5] directly by treatment with benzene in the presence triflic acid. This method of synthesis enables a 99% yield of product.

Thieme Synthesis:

4-Phenyl-1-t-butyl-4-piperidinol, (1)

1-t-butyl-3-benzoyl-4-phenyl-4-piperidinol [81831-81-4] (3)

== See also ==
- AD-1211
- Delucemine
- Diphenidine
- Ephenidine
- Fluorolintane
- Lanicemine
- Methoxphenidine (MXP)
- MT-45
- Remacemide
