= 1,2-Diarylethylamine =

Class of chemical compounds

- Drug class
- 1,2-Diphenylethylamine, the parent structure of most of the 1,2-diarylethylamines

Class identifiers
- Synonyms: 1,2-Diphenylethylamines
- Use: Research chemicals; some as designer drugs
- Mode of action: Dissociative
- Mechanism of action: Antagonist
- Biological target: NMDA receptor
- Chemical class: Arylalkylamine

Legal status

1,2-Diarylethylamines are a class of psychoactive compounds defined by two aryl groups attached to adjacent carbon atoms on an ethylamine backbone. These compounds display a range of pharmacological activities, most notably as NMDA receptor antagonists, and have attracted attention as dissociative designer drugs that produce feelings of detachment from reality or oneself.

== History ==
The synthesis of diphenidine reported as far back as 1924 by Christiaen. The parent structure of the class, 1,2-diphenylethylamine was first synthesized in the 1940s and showed weak analgesic activity.

However it was not until the early 2010s that 1,2-diarylethylamines gained prominence as dissociative designer drugs. This shift occurred following legislative controls on arylcyclohexylamines (such as ketamine and phencyclidine analogues) in the United Kingdom in 2013, which prompted the introduction of diphenidine and related compounds like methoxphenidine (MXP) and ephenidine to the grey market as "legal highs" or "research chemicals".

== Chemistry ==
1,2-Diarylethylamines contain the substructure ArCH_{2}CH(Ar')NRR', where Ar, Ar' = aryl and R, R' = H or organyl.

A chiral center exists at the ethylamine carbon atom bearing the two aryl groups. The enantiomers often have a large difference in pharmacological activity. For example, (+)-(S)-diphenidine has 40 times higher affinity than (−)-(R)-form for the NMDA receptor.

According to a review by Jason Wallach and Simon Brandt (2018), most psychoactive 1,2-diarylethylamines reported in the scientific literature contain non-heteroaromatic aryl groups (i.e., both rings are carbocyclic). Some exceptions include lanicemine and an analogue N-ethyl-lanicemine, which feature a heteroaromatic pyridyl ring. Additional heteroaromatic analogues have been disclosed in the patent literature.

== Pharmacology ==
=== Pharmacodynamics ===
1,2-Diarylethylamines primarily antagonize NMDA receptors, leading to dissociative effects like those of ketamine or phencyclidine (PCP). Many also interact with dopamine/norepinephrine transporters (DAT/NET) and sigma receptors, contributing to stimulant or hallucinogenic properties.

Receptor binding affinities of 1,2-diarylethylamines at key CNS receptor sites
Compound	NMDAR (Ki, nM)	NET (Ki, nM)	DAT (Ki, nM)	SERT (Ki, nM)
Diphenidine (DPH)	29	3,104	274	13,514
(+)-(S)-DPH	18	–	–	–
(−)-(R)-DPH	4,960	–	–	–
2-MXP	103	6,900	3,858	15,000
Ephenidine	162	841	379	>10,000

1,2-Diarylethylamines exert their primary effects as uncompetitive antagonists of the N-methyl-D-aspartate receptor (NMDAR), similar to phencyclidine (PCP) and ketamine. This mechanism is believed to underlie their characteristic dissociative, hallucinogenic, and anesthetic properties. Compounds such as diphenidine, methoxphenidine (MXP), and ephenidine display high to moderate affinity for the NMDAR PCP-binding site (e.g., diphenidine Ki ≈ 18–39 nM). Additionally, some members of this class exhibit secondary interactions with monoamine transporters, including the dopamine and norepinephrine transporters (DAT and NET), as well as modest binding to sigma-1 and sigma-2 receptors, serotonin 5-HT2A receptors, alpha-adrenergic receptors, and the kappa opioid receptor. Despite potent NMDAR binding, several compounds exhibit reduced in vivo potency, potentially due to pharmacokinetic factors.

=== Pharmacokinetics ===
1,2-Diarylethylamines are generally lipophilic, allowing for extensive tissue distribution, particularly in adipose tissue. For example, diphenidine has been found at concentrations exceeding 11,000 ng/g in fat tissue during postmortem analysis. These compounds are typically active via oral and parenteral routes, with exposure ranging from 3 to 8 hours depending on the compound and dosage. Metabolism primarily occurs via hepatic cytochrome P450 enzymes, including CYP1A2, CYP2B6, CYP2C9, CYP2C19, and CYP3A4, leading to hydroxylated, dealkylated, and oxidized metabolites. Phase II conjugation processes such as glucuronidation and sulfation also occur. Metabolites are excreted in urine and have been detected in both clinically and in forensic settings.

== Research ==
A number of 1,2-diarylethylamines have been explored in pharmaceutical research. Clinical analogs such as lanicemine (AZD6765) and remacemide have shown potential in the treatment of depression, epilepsy, and neurodegenerative diseases. Diphenidine and ephenidine have been used in animal models to investigate NMDAR-mediated neurophysiological processes, including synaptic plasticity and long-term potentiation. The unique pharmacological profiles of these compounds have also made them subjects of interest in studies of schizophrenia and psychosis. Despite promising in vitro and in vivo data, no 1,2-diarylethylamines have yet achieved widespread medical approval for psychiatric or analgesic indications.

== Examples ==
- Diphenidine
- Fluorolintane (fluorinated analog of diphenidine)
- Methoxphenidine (2-MeO-diphenidine, MXP)
- Ephenidine (NEDPA, EPE)
- Lanicemine
- MT-45 (exhibits opioid activity)
- Remacemide

== Society and culture ==
Since the early 2010s, several 1,2-diarylethylamines have emerged as new psychoactive substances (NPS) on the recreational drug market. Compounds such as diphenidine and MXP were sold online as "research chemicals" or "legal highs," often in response to regulatory crackdowns on ketamine and arylcyclohexylamine derivatives. These substances have gained popularity among users seeking dissociative effects akin to PCP and ketamine but outside legal control. Online forums and user reports have documented a range of subjective experiences, from euphoria and altered perception to confusion and dissociation. However, hospitalizations and fatalities associated with their combined use with other drugs have prompted increasing regulatory scrutiny. Their sale and use have raised concerns regarding public health, leading to bans or restrictions in several countries.

== See also ==
- List of designer drugs § 1,2-Diarylethylamines
