= Indapyrophenidone =

Chemical compound

Legal status
- Legal status: DE: NpSG (Industrial and scientific use only); UK: Under Psychoactive Substances Act

Identifiers
- IUPAC name: 1-(2,3-dihydro-1H-inden-5-yl)-2-phenyl-2-(pyrrolidin-1-yl)-ethanone
- CAS Number: 2055940-97-9
- PubChem CID: 129844581
- ChemSpider: 58858896
- UNII: M2S46BF87V
- CompTox Dashboard (EPA): DTXSID601016266

Chemical and physical data
- Formula: C_{21}H_{23}NO
- Molar mass: 305.421 g·mol^{−1}
- 3D model (JSmol): Interactive image
- SMILES: O=C(C(N1CCCC1)c2ccccc2)c3ccc4CCCc4c3
- InChI: InChI=1S/C21H23NO/c23-21(19-12-11-16-9-6-10-18(16)15-19)20(22-13-4-5-14-22)17-7-2-1-3-8-17/h1-3,7-8,11-12,15,20H,4-6,9-10,13-14H2; Key:JFDZZTSFBTYYDF-UHFFFAOYSA-N

Indapyrophenidone is a synthetic drug of the cathinone class that has been sold online as a designer drug.

The substance is the indanyl-α-phenyl analogue of the stimulant drug α-PVP; however, it is also structurally related to diarylethylamines such as fluorolintane and UWA-001. Its mechanism of action is unknown.

== See also ==
- 3,4-Pr-PipVP
- 5-BPDi
- Alpha-D2PV
- βk-Ephenidine
- Diphenidine
- Ephenidine
- Lefetamine
- Methoxphenidine
- Pyrovalerone
- TH-PVP
