= NPDPA =

Chemical compound

Legal status
- Legal status: AU: S9 (Prohibited substance); DE: NpSG (Industrial and scientific use only); UK: Under Psychoactive Substances Act; Illegal in Sweden

Identifiers
- IUPAC name: N-(propan-2-yl)-1,2-diphenylethylamine
- CAS Number: 774118-46-6
- PubChem CID: 110817
- ChemSpider: 99466
- UNII: 7DZ8JAX6K7
- CompTox Dashboard (EPA): DTXSID601336208

Chemical and physical data
- Formula: C_{17}H_{21}N
- Molar mass: 239.362 g·mol^{−1}
- 3D model (JSmol): Interactive image
- SMILES: c1ccccc1CC(NC(C)C)c2ccccc2
- InChI: InChI=1S/C17H21N/c1-14(2)18-17(16-11-7-4-8-12-16)13-15-9-5-3-6-10-15/h3-12,14,17-18H,13H2,1-2H3; Key:FBRJTEBLJRHAQX-UHFFFAOYSA-N

NPDPA (also known as isopropylphenidine or isophenidine) is a dissociative anesthetic that has been sold online as a designer drug. It was first identified in Germany in 2008, and while it has never been as widely sold as related compounds such as diphenidine and ephenidine, it has continued to show up in seized drug samples occasionally, and was banned in Sweden in 2015.

== Metabolism ==
Isopropylphenidine's metabolic pathway consists of N-oxidation, N-dealkylation, mono- and bis-hydroxylation of the benzene ring, and hydroxylation of the phenyl ring only after N-dealkylation. The dihydroxy metabolites were conjugated by methylation of one hydroxy group, and hydroxy metabolites by glucuronidation or sulfation.

== Legality ==
Sweden's public health agency suggested that NPDPA be classified as a hazardous substance on 1 June 2015. Due to that suggestion it became a scheduled substance in Sweden, as of 18 August 2015. It has also been proposed for control in Germany under analogue provisions, though these have not yet come into force as of 2016.

In Australia, the Therapeutic Goods Administration decided to include NPDPA, with reference to isophenidine, as a Prohibited substance (Schedule 9) within the Standard for the Uniform Scheduling of Medicines and Poisons alongside four other phenidine analogs on 1 October 2024.

== See also ==
- AD-1211
- Fluorolintane
- Lanicemine
- Methoxphenidine (MXP)
- MT-45
- Propylphenidine
- Remacemide
- UWA-001
