= C19H27NO =

The molecular formula C_{19}H_{27}NO (molar mass: 285.42 g/mol, exact mass: 285.2093 u) may refer to:

- 5-BPDi
- Ciprefadol
- Pentazocine
- 3,4-Pr-PipVP
