= 1,2-Diphenylethylamine =

Names
- Preferred IUPAC name 1,2-Diphenylethan-1-amine

Identifiers
CAS Number	25611-78-3
3D model (JSmol)	Interactive image
ChEMBL	ChEMBL351811
ChemSpider	24666
ECHA InfoCard	100.042.828
EC Number	247-126-4
PubChem CID	26482
CompTox Dashboard (EPA)	DTXSID20871350
- InChI: InChI=1S/C14H15N/c15-14(13-9-5-2-6-10-13)11-12-7-3-1-4-8-12/h1-10,14H,11,15H2 Key: DTGGNTMERRTPLR-UHFFFAOYSA-N
- SMILES: C1=CC=C(C=C1)CC(C2=CC=CC=C2)N

Properties
Chemical formula	C_{14}H_{15}N
Molar mass	197.281 g·mol^{−1}
- Except where otherwise noted, data are given for materials in their standard state (at 25 °C [77 °F], 100 kPa). Infobox references

1,2-Diphenylethylamine is an organic compound and the parent compound of a group of 1,2-diarylethylamine containing NMDA receptor antagonists and dissociative hallucinogens that includes diphenidine, ephenidine, fluorolintane, and methoxyphenidine among others.
