= SePP =

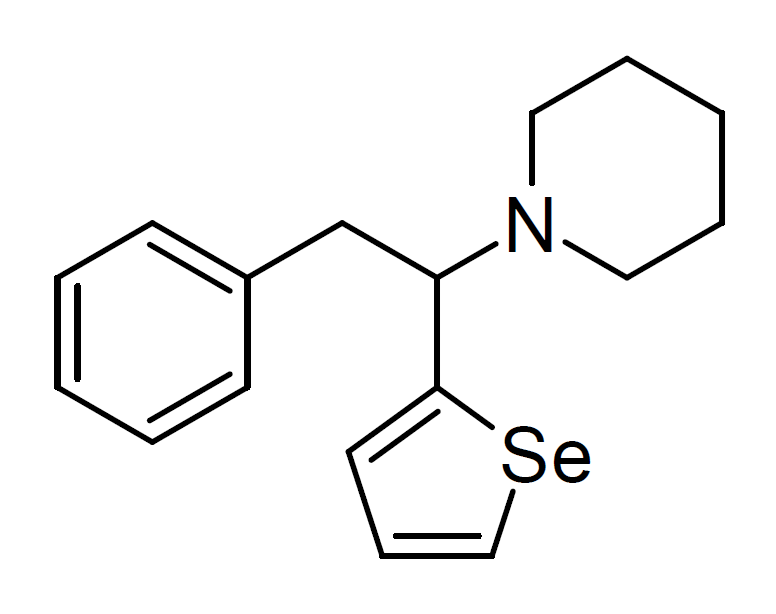

Identifiers
- IUPAC name: 1-(2-phenyl-1-selenophen-2-ylethyl)piperidine

Chemical and physical data
- Formula: C_{17}H_{21}NSe
- Molar mass: 318.333 g·mol^{−1}
- 3D model (JSmol): Interactive image
- SMILES: C1=CC=CC=C1CC(N2CCCCC2)C3[Se]C=CC=3
- InChI: InChI=InChI=1S/C17H21NSe/c1-3-8-15(9-4-1)14-16(17-10-7-13-19-17)18-11-5-2-6-12-18/h1,3-4,7-10,13,16H,2,5-6,11-12,14H2; Key:WBOODFQEMOGDKL-UHFFFAOYSA-N

SePP is a compound derived from the dissociative anesthetic diphenidine but containing an unusual selenophene ring, which shows both NMDA antagonist effects and with weaker activity as a norepinephrine–dopamine reuptake inhibitor, and has been researched as a potential treatment agent for Fragile X syndrome.

== See also ==
- Ephenidine
- Methoxphenidine
