= Propylphenidine =

Chemical compound

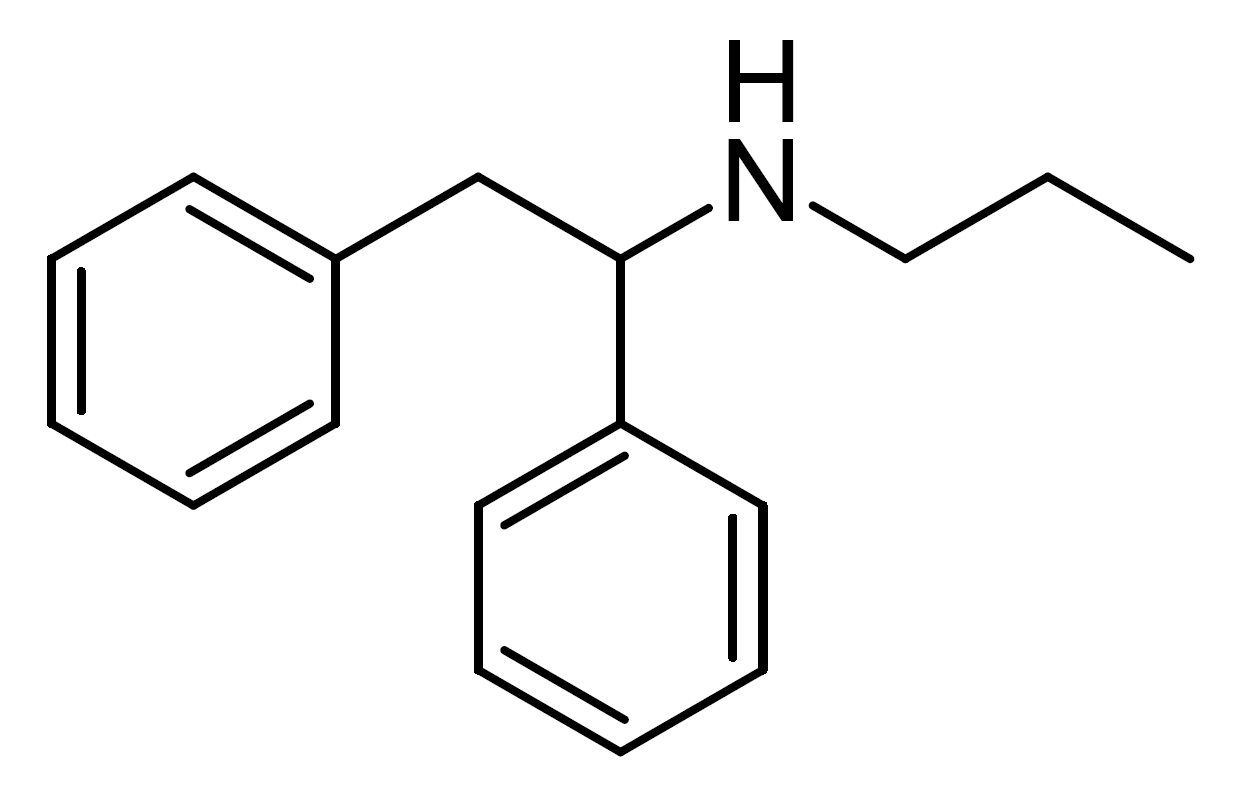

Legal status
- Legal status: AU: S9 (Prohibited substance)

Identifiers
- IUPAC name: N-(1,2-diphenylethyl)propan-1-amine
- CAS Number: 6266-42-8
- PubChem CID: 110815
- ChemSpider: 99464

Chemical and physical data
- Formula: C_{17}H_{21}N
- Molar mass: 239.362 g·mol^{−1}
- 3D model (JSmol): Interactive image
- SMILES: CCCNC(CC1=CC=CC=C1)C2=CC=CC=C2
- InChI: InChI=1S/C17H21N/c1-2-13-18-17(16-11-7-4-8-12-16)14-15-9-5-3-6-10-15/h3-12,17-18H,2,13-14H2,1H3; Key:QDJKYFSVYJISOP-UHFFFAOYSA-N

Propylphenidine is a compound which has been sold as a designer drug, first identified in Australia in 2023. It is unclear what kind of activity it has, as it is claimed to be a stimulant in a patent along with related compounds such as phenylpropylaminopentane, but other structurally similar compounds such as ephenidine and isophenidine are dissociative anesthetic drugs, so it may produce either kind of activity or perhaps a mixture of both.

== Legal Status ==
In Australia, the Therapeutic Goods Administration decided to include propylphenidine as a Prohibited substance (Schedule 9) within the Standard for the Uniform Scheduling of Medicines and Poisons alongside four other phenidine analogs on 1 October 2024.

== See also ==
- Diphenidine
- Lefetamine
- Prolintane
