= C25H28N2O2 =

The molecular formula C_{25}H_{28}N_{2}O_{2} may refer to:

- Diphenpipenol
- JNJ-20788560
