= 2-(Ethylamino)-1,2-diphenylethanone =

Chemical compound

Clinical data
- ATC code: None

Identifiers
- IUPAC name: 2-(ethylamino)-1,2-diphenylethanone
- CAS Number: 22312-16-9
- PubChem CID: 69702363
- ChemSpider: 129327880
- UNII: 8R3EAH84GZ
- CompTox Dashboard (EPA): DTXSID401337074

Chemical and physical data
- Formula: C_{16}H_{17}NO
- Molar mass: 239.318 g·mol^{−1}
- 3D model (JSmol): Interactive image
- SMILES: CCNC(C1=CC=CC=C1)C(=O)C2=CC=CC=C2
- InChI: InChI=1S/C16H17NO/c1-2-17-15(13-9-5-3-6-10-13)16(18)14-11-7-4-8-12-14/h3-12,15,17H,2H2,1H3; Key:NHNVMSYWZNJBOO-UHFFFAOYSA-N

2-(Ethylamino)-1,2-diphenylethanone (also known as α-ethylamino-deoxybenzoin, [α-(Ethylamino)benzyl]-(phenyl)-ketone and βk-Ephenidine) is a chemical compound which was first invented in 1955, researched by ICI in 1969 as an antidepressant, and subsequently claimed by AstraZeneca as an inhibitor of the enzyme 11β-Hydroxysteroid dehydrogenase type 1. No other pharmacological data has been disclosed, though its chemical structure closely resembles that of certain designer drug compounds such as ephenidine and N-ethylhexedrone.

== See also ==
- α-PCYP
- Alpha-D2PV
- Fluorolintane
- Indapyrophenidone
- Lefetamine
- UWA-001
