= C16H19N =

The molecular formula C_{16}H_{19}N (molar mass: 225.33 g/mol, exact mass: 225.1517 u) may refer to:

- Ephenidine
- Lefetamine
- β-Phenylmethamphetamine (N,α-dimethyl-β-phenyl-phenethylamine)
