= AP-238 =

Opioid designer drug

Legal status
- Legal status: UK: Under Psychoactive Substances Act; US: Unscheduled

Identifiers
- IUPAC name: 1-[(2R,6S)-2,6-dimethyl-4-[(E)-3-phenylprop-2-enyl]piperazin-1-yl]propan-1-one
- CAS Number: (racemic) 4204-01-7 (racemic) 140924-11-4 (2R,6S enantiomer)
- PubChem CID: 124389619
- ChemSpider: 4941886
- UNII: N26WML8AR7

Chemical and physical data
- Formula: C_{18}H_{26}N_{2}O
- Molar mass: 286.419 g·mol^{−1}
- 3D model (JSmol): Interactive image
- SMILES: CCC(=O)N1[C@@H](CN(C[C@@H]1C)C/C=C/C2=CC=CC=C2)C
- InChI: InChI=1S/C18H26N2O/c1-4-18(21)20-15(2)13-19(14-16(20)3)12-8-11-17-9-6-5-7-10-17/h5-11,15-16H,4,12-14H2,1-3H3/b11-8+/t15-,16+; Key:JELNWDOXWGBBLO-QJBCGIKSSA-N

AP-238 is an opioid designer drug related to drugs such as azaprocin and bucinnazine, with around the same potency as morphine. It was first discovered in Italy in the 1960s but was never marketed, subsequently appearing on the illicit market around 2020 and being detected in both Slovenia and the USA.

== See also ==
- 2F-Viminol
- Diphenpipenol
- Dipyanone
- Etodesnitazene
- MT-45
- Nortilidine
- O-AMKD
- O-DSMT
- Piperidylthiambutene
- SHR9352
