= Α-D2PV =

Chemical compound

α-D2PV
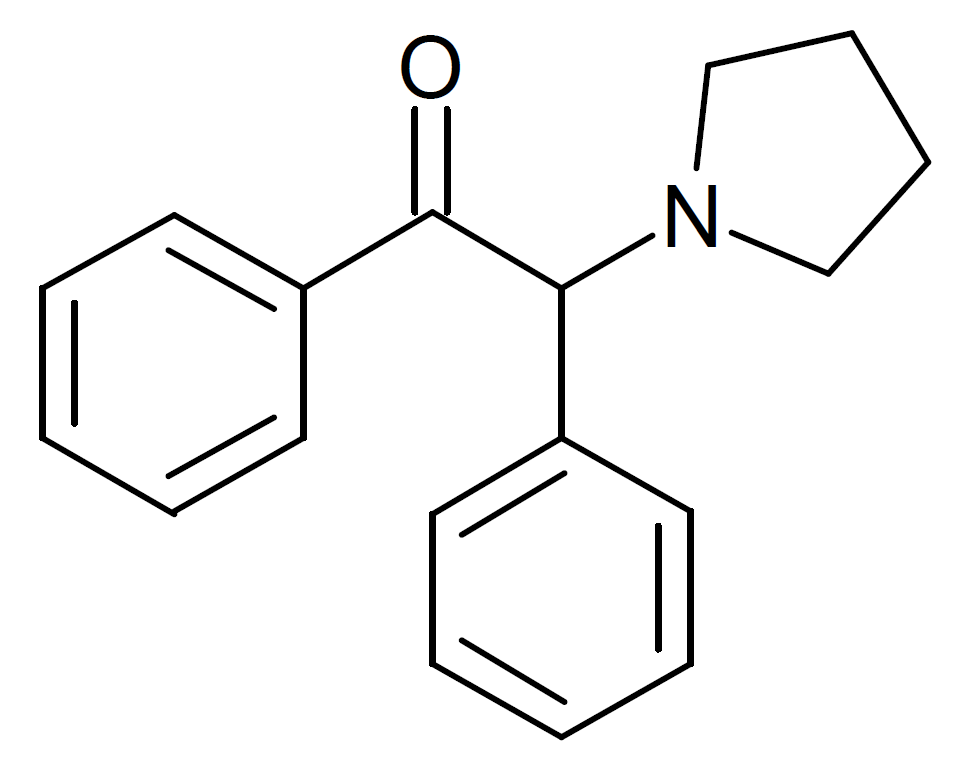

Legal status
- Legal status: DE: Anlage II (Authorized trade only, not prescriptible); UK: Class B

Identifiers
- IUPAC name: 1,2-diphenyl-2-(1-pyrrolidinyl)ethanone
- CAS Number: 27590-61-0
- PubChem CID: 33957
- ChemSpider: 31300
- UNII: 5EB3HC2KW8

Chemical and physical data
- Formula: C_{18}H_{19}N
- Molar mass: 249.357 g·mol^{−1}
- 3D model (JSmol): Interactive image
- SMILES: C1CCN(C1)C(C2=CC=CC=C2)C(=O)C3=CC=CC=C3
- InChI: InChI=1S/C18H19NO/c20-18(16-11-5-2-6-12-16)17(19-13-7-8-14-19)15-9-3-1-4-10-15/h1-6,9-12,17H,7-8,13-14H2; Key:GQCCTZGWWWUYLS-UHFFFAOYSA-N

α-D2PV (DPPE) is a substituted cathinone derivative which has been sold as a designer drug. It was invented in the 1950s, and first identified by forensic laboratories as a designer drug in 2020, though anecdotal reports suggest it may have emerged earlier than this. It is similar in structure to the potent designer stimulant drug alpha-PVP but with the propyl side chain replaced by a phenyl ring, and while it is less potent than alpha-PVP itself, Alpha-D2PV is still a reasonably potent stimulant and has been known to cause poisoning when misrepresented as less potent drugs such as MDMA. While it is also similar in structure to the dissociative drug diphenidine, Alpha-D2PV appears to produce only stimulant effects.

In terms of the synthesis, it is made in a one-step Voight reaction between benzoin and pyrrolidine.

== See also ==
- α-PCYP
- βk-Ephenidine
- IPPV
- Fluorolintane
- Lefetamine
- Zylofuramine
