= C17H21N =

The molecular formula C_{17}H_{21}N (molar mass: 239.36 g/mol, exact mass: 239.1674 u) may refer to:

- Benzphetamine
- Demelverine
- NPDPA, also known as isopropylphenidine or isophenidine
- 4-PhPr-PEA
