= C18H26N2O =

The molecular formula C_{18}H_{26}N_{2}O (molar mass: 286.419 g/mol) may refer to:

- AP-238
- Bay R 1531
