= 2F-Viminol =

Chemical compound

Legal status
- Legal status: BR: Class F1 (Prohibited narcotics); UK: Under Psychoactive Substances Act; Illegal in Sweden and Latvia

Identifiers
- IUPAC name: 2-[di(butan-2-yl)amino]-1-[1-[(2-fluorophenyl)methyl]pyrrol-2-yl]ethanol
- CAS Number: 63880-43-3
- PubChem CID: 57419227
- ChemSpider: 84400601
- UNII: K5W46P6ZPE
- CompTox Dashboard (EPA): DTXSID201336844

Chemical and physical data
- Formula: C_{21}H_{31}FN_{2}O
- Molar mass: 346.490 g·mol^{−1}
- 3D model (JSmol): Interactive image
- SMILES: FC1=C(CN2C=CC=C2C(O)CN(C(CC)C)C(C)CC)C=CC=C1
- InChI: InChI=1S/C21H31FN2O/c1-5-16(3)24(17(4)6-2)15-21(25)20-12-9-13-23(20)14-18-10-7-8-11-19(18)22/h7-13,16-17,21,25H,5-6,14-15H2,1-4H3; Key:FXQMNNHPOYWWKI-UHFFFAOYSA-N

2F-Viminol is a pyrrole derived opioid analgesic drug, which was originally developed by a team at the drug company Zambon in the 1960s. It is around twice as potent as the parent compound viminol, though unlike viminol, 2F-viminol has never passed clinical trials or been approved for medical use. 2F-Viminol has been sold as a designer drug, first being identified in Sweden in 2019. It is one of a number of structurally atypical opioid agonists to have appeared on the designer drug grey-market since broad controls over fentanyl analogues were introduced in China in 2015. It was made illegal in Sweden in August 2019 and in Latvia in November 2019.

== See also ==
- AP-237
- Brorphine
- Isotonitazene
- Z4349
