= 1-(3-Chlorophenyl)-4-(2-phenylethyl)piperazine =

Chemical compound

3C-PEP

Clinical data
- Other names: 1-(3-Chlorophenyl)-4-(2-phenylethyl)piperazine

Identifiers
- IUPAC name: 1-(3-Chlorophenyl)-4-(2-phenylethyl)piperazine
- CAS Number: 147429-37-6
- PubChem CID: 2845469
- ChemSpider: 2121938
- UNII: 3LEH2E7AEU
- CompTox Dashboard (EPA): DTXSID501032720

Chemical and physical data
- Formula: C_{18}H_{21}ClN_{2}
- Molar mass: 300.83 g·mol^{−1}
- 3D model (JSmol): Interactive image
- SMILES: ClC1=CC=CC(=C1)N2CCN(CC2)CCC3=CC=CC=C3
- InChI: InChI=1S/C18H21ClN2/c19-17-7-4-8-18(15-17)21-13-11-20(12-14-21)10-9-16-5-2-1-3-6-16/h1-8,15H,9-14H2; Key:NKMGWZZAFWDLFG-UHFFFAOYSA-N

3C-PEP, also known as 1-(3-chlorophenyl)-4-(2-phenylethyl)piperazine, is a designer drug of the piperazine class of chemical substances. 3C-PEP is related to meta-cholorophenylpiperazine (mCPP) and phenethylamine which can be thought of as mCPP having a phenylethyl group attached to the nitrogen atom at its 4-position. It was first described in 1994 in a patent disclosing a series of piperazine compounds as sigma receptor ligands. Later, it was discovered to be a highly potent dopamine reuptake inhibitor.

== Pharmacology ==
3C-PEP is one of the most potent dopamine transporter (DAT) ligands reported to date. It is highly selective for the dopamine transporter (dissociation constant K_{i} = 0.04 nM) with relatively low affinity for the closely related norepinephrine transporter (NET, K_{i} = 1107 nM ) and the serotonin transporter (SERT, K_{i} = 802 nM). In addition, the compound has lower (or no) affinity for the PCP/NMDA receptor (K_{i} > 10000 nM), D2-like receptors (K_{i} = 327 nM), serotonin 5-HT2 receptors (K_{i} = 53 nM), and opioid receptors (K_{i} > 10000 nM).

With a DAT dissociation constant K_{i} of 0.04 nM, 3C-PEP is one of the most potent dopamine transporter ligands described to date in the literature. In comparison, cocaine which is a prototypical DAT ligand and reuptake inhibitor has a dissociation constant K_{i} of 435 nm thus making 3C-PEP about 10,000 times more potent than cocaine as a dopamine transporter inhibitor in vitro.

== Legal status ==
=== United States ===
3C-PEP is not scheduled at the federal level in the United States,

=== Canada ===
3C-PEP is not scheduled under the Controlled Drugs and Substances Act.

== See also ==
- Substituted piperazine
- Etoperidone, nefazodone, and trazodone (structurally related drugs which may also produce mCPP as a metabolite)
- CM156
- Diphenpipenol
- MT-45
