= N-Ethyl-lanicemine =

Experimental lanicemine based drug

- Structural diagram of N-ethyl-lanicemine

Names
- IUPAC name N-ethyl-1-phenyl-2-pyridin-2-ylethanamine
- Other names Ethyl[1-phenyl-2-(pyridin-2-yl)ethyl]amine

Identifiers
3D model (JSmol)	Interactive image
ChemSpider	38343049
PubChem CID	60818702
- InChI: InChI=1S/C15H18N2/c1-2-16-15(13-8-4-3-5-9-13)12-14-10-6-7-11-17-14/h3-11,15-16H,2,12H2,1H3 Key: SPBDLAUONJHXNB-UHFFFAOYSA-N
- SMILES: CCNC(CC1=CC=CC=N1)C2=CC=CC=C2

Properties
Chemical formula	C_{15}H_{18}N_{2}
Molar mass	226.323 g·mol^{−1}

Related compounds
Related compounds	lanicemine
- Except where otherwise noted, data are given for materials in their standard state (at 25 °C [77 °F], 100 kPa). Infobox references

N-Ethyl-lanicemine (or ethyl[1-phenyl-2-(pyridin-2-yl)ethyl]amine) is an analogue of lanicemine and a designer drug that has been sold online due to being a high trapping NMDAR antagonist and having possible PCP-like effects in humans. It is in the 1,2-diarylethylanime class of dissociatives.
