= CM156 =

Piperazine based chemical compound

Identifiers
- IUPAC name: 3-[4-(4-cyclohexylpiperazin-1-yl)butyl]-1,3-benzothiazole-2-thione
- CAS Number: 1016670-25-9
- PubChem CID: 17756659
- ChemSpider: 23325411
- ChEMBL: ChEMBL272603
- CompTox Dashboard (EPA): DTXSID301336011

Chemical and physical data
- Formula: C_{21}H_{31}N_{3}S_{2}
- Molar mass: 389.62 g·mol^{−1}
- 3D model (JSmol): Interactive image
- SMILES: c1ccc2c(c1)n(c(=S)s2)CCCCN3CCN(CC3)C4CCCCC4
- InChI: InChI=1S/C21H31N3S2/c25-21-24(19-10-4-5-11-20(19)26-21)13-7-6-12-22-14-16-23(17-15-22)18-8-2-1-3-9-18/h4-5,10-11,18H,1-3,6-9,12-17H2; Key:FJGOTAJCEJCFEV-UHFFFAOYSA-N

CM156 is a piperazine based chemical compound with nanomolar affinity for both sigma receptor subtypes that has been shown to counteract the deleterious effects of administered cocaine.

== See also ==
- 3C-PEP
- MT-45
