= Z4349 =

Chemical compound

Identifiers
- IUPAC name: (5S)-5-[(1S)-2-[bis[(2R)-butan-2-yl]amino]-1-hydroxyethyl]-1-(2-chlorobenzyl)pyrrolidin-2-one
- CAS Number: 127093-63-4
- PubChem CID: 10317679
- ChemSpider: 8493143
- UNII: TZU6N9X9YS

Chemical and physical data
- Formula: C_{21}H_{33}ClN_{2}O_{2}
- Molar mass: 380.96 g·mol^{−1}
- 3D model (JSmol): Interactive image
- SMILES: CC[C@@H](C)N(C[C@@H]([C@@H]1CCC(=O)N1CC2=CC=CC=C2Cl)O)[C@H](C)CC
- InChI: InChI=1S/C21H33ClN2O2/c1-5-15(3)23(16(4)6-2)14-20(25)19-11-12-21(26)24(19)13-17-9-7-8-10-18(17)22/h7-10,15-16,19-20,25H,5-6,11-14H2,1-4H3/t15-,16-,19+,20+/m1/s1; Key:YNGZJSALRCLELM-YKCBXCCJSA-N

Z4349 is an opioid analgesic drug developed in the 1990s by the pharmaceutical company Zambon. It is a derivative of an older drug viminol, which has been modified to improve potency and metabolic stability. In tests on mice it was found to be several hundred times the potency of morphine.

== Synthesis ==
Z4349 synthesis

Esterification of L-glutamic acid [56-86-0] (1) with ethanol gives Glutamic acid diethyl ester [16450-41-2] (2). Lactam formation occurs on heating to give L-Pyroglutamic acid ethyl ester [7149-65-7] (3). The reduction of the ester with sodium borohydride gives L-Pyroglutaminol [17342-08-4] (4). Treatment with methyl chloride gave (S)-(5-Oxopyrrolidin-2-yl)methyl methanesulfonate [93288-20-1] (5). Displacement of the leaving group with cyanide led to (S)-5-Oxo-2-pyrrolidineacetonitrile [72479-06-2] (6). Catalytic reduction over Rosenmund catalyst in the presence of dimethylamine led to (5S)-5-[2-(dimethylamino)ethyl]pyrrolidin-2-one, PC13306712 (7). Oxidation in the presence of hydrogen peroxide formed the N-oxide (8). Elimination of the amino group in the presence of weak base led to (S)-5-Vinylpyrrolidin-2-one [93288-23-4] (9). Alkylation of the amino group with 2-Chlorobenzyl chloride [611-19-8] (10) in the presence of sodium hydride base led to (5S)-1-[(2-chlorophenyl)methyl]-5-ethenylpyrrolidin-2-one, PC56976994 (11). Treatment of the vinyl group with peroxy acid gave the oxirane. (5S)-1-[(2-chlorophenyl)methyl]-5-(oxiran-2-yl)pyrrolidin-2-one, PC88496451 (12). Treatment with (2R)-N-[(2R)-butan-2-yl]butan-2-amine, PC6347588 (13) completed the synthesis of Z4349 (14).

== See also ==
- 2F-Viminol
- Desnitroetonitazene
