= C14H15N =

The molecular formula C_{14}H_{15}N may refer to:

- Dibenzylamine
- 1,2-Diphenylethylamine
