= Viminol =

Opioid analgesic medicine

Clinical data
- Trade names: Dividol
- Other names: Dividol, viminolo, diviminol
- AHFS/Drugs.com: International Drug Names
- Routes of administration: Oral
- ATC code: N02BG05 (WHO)

Legal status
- Legal status: BR: Class A1 (Narcotic drugs)

Identifiers
- IUPAC name: 1-[1-[(2-Chlorophenyl)methyl]pyrrol-2-yl]-2-[di(butan-2-yl)amino]ethanol
- CAS Number: 21363-18-8
- PubChem CID: 65697
- ChemSpider: 59125
- UNII: TPV54G6XBG
- KEGG: D07295
- ChEMBL: ChEMBL2104940
- CompTox Dashboard (EPA): DTXSID00864987
- ECHA InfoCard: 100.040.301

Chemical and physical data
- Formula: C_{21}H_{31}ClN_{2}O
- Molar mass: 362.94 g·mol^{−1}
- 3D model (JSmol): Interactive image
- SMILES: CCC(C)N(C(C)CC)CC(O)C1=CC=CN1CC2=CC=CC=C2Cl
- InChI: InChI=1S/C21H31ClN2O/c1-5-16(3)24(17(4)6-2)15-21(25)20-12-9-13-23(20)14-18-10-7-8-11-19(18)22/h7-13,16-17,21,25H,5-6,14-15H2,1-4H3; Key:ZILPIBYANAFGMS-UHFFFAOYSA-N

Viminol (marketed under the brandname Dividol) is an opioid analgesic developed by a team at the drug company Zambon in the 1960s. Viminol is based on the α-pyrryl-2-aminoethanol structure, unlike any other class of opioids.

Viminol has both antitussive (cough suppressing) and analgesic (pain reducing) effects. Viminol has additional effects similar to other opioids including sedation and euphoria. It has six different stereoisomers which have varying properties. Four are inactive, but the 1S-(R,R)-disecbutyl isomer is a μ-opioid full agonist around 5.5 times more potent than morphine and the 1S-(S,S)-disecbutyl isomer is an antagonist. Since viminol is supplied as a racemic mixture of isomers, the overall effect is a mixed agonist–antagonist profile similar to that of opioids such as pentazocine, although with somewhat fewer side effects.

== Side effects ==
Side effects are similar to other opioids, and can include:

- Itching
- Nausea
- Sedation
- Respiratory depression - can be potentially life-threatening

However, since viminol is supplied as a racemic mixture of agonist and antagonist isomers, the abuse potential and respiratory depression tends to be less than that of μ-opioid full agonist drugs.

Drug dependence may occur.

== Related compounds ==
Later work showed that replacing the chlorine atom with a fluorine atom (2F-Viminol) or with a trifluoromethyl group produced a compound with twice the potency and half the acute toxicity. A later team at Zambon found that one isomer of a pyrrolidone analog is 318 times as potent as morphine in its analgesic activity in animal studies. A number of related compounds were also found to be active, allowing a QSAR model to be constructed.

Trifluoromethyl analog

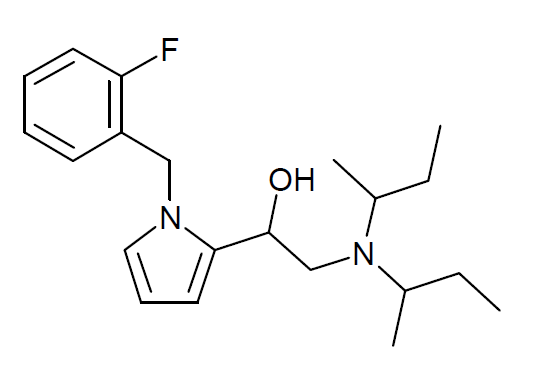
Fluoro analog "2F-Viminol"

Pyrrolidone analog, Z4349
