= Prodipine =

Experimental antiparkinsonian drug

Clinical data
- Other names: BY-101; 1-Isopropyl-4,4-diphenylpiperidine
- Routes of administration: Oral, intravenous injection
- Drug class: Antiparkinsonian agents

Identifiers
- IUPAC name: 4,4-diphenyl-1-propan-2-ylpiperidine
- CAS Number: 31314-38-2
- PubChem CID: 65775
- ChemSpider: 59195
- UNII: 51567MYG7V
- ChEMBL: ChEMBL277382
- CompTox Dashboard (EPA): DTXSID20185247

Chemical and physical data
- Formula: C_{20}H_{25}N
- Molar mass: 279.427 g·mol^{−1}
- 3D model (JSmol): Interactive image
- SMILES: CC(C)N1CCC(CC1)(C2=CC=CC=C2)C3=CC=CC=C3
- InChI: InChI=1S/C20H25N/c1-17(2)21-15-13-20(14-16-21,18-9-5-3-6-10-18)19-11-7-4-8-12-19/h3-12,17H,13-16H2,1-2H3; Key:CFOOTBBXHJHHMT-UHFFFAOYSA-N

Prodipine (INN; developmental code name BY-101) is an experimental antiparkinsonian agent of the 4,4-diphenylpiperidine series related to budipine which was never marketed. It was the predecessor of budipine and was similarly found to be effective in the treatment of Parkinson's disease. However, prodipine produced side effects including gastrointestinal adverse effects, nausea and vomiting, and hypotension. Due to the nausea and vomiting with the oral form, it could only be tolerated with intravenous administration. As a result, budipine, which had fewer side effects, was developed instead.

== Pharmacology ==
The mechanism of action of these drugs is unknown. However, budipine is known to stimulate the catecholaminergic system and to increase motor activity and vigilance in animals. It also increases brain dopamine, norepinephrine, and serotonin levels in animals treated with the monoamine depleting agent reserpine. It does not affect monoamine oxidase nor does it appear to interact with dopamine D_{2} receptors. Both budipine and prodipine have been described as "central stimulants" in addition to antiparkinsonian agents. Prodipine is said to have more tendency to induce hyperactivity than budipine.

== Analogues ==
Besides prodipine and budipine, another close analogue, medipine, was also developed.
