= TH-PVP =

Chemical compound

Clinical data
- Other names: αP-VTHNa2; Tetralin-α-PVP; α-Propyl-β-ketotetralinylethylpyrrolidine
- Drug class: Monoamine reuptake inhibitor
- ATC code: None

Legal status
- Legal status: BR: Class F2 (Prohibited psychotropics); CA: Schedule I; DE: NpSG (Industrial and scientific use only); UK: Under Psychoactive Substances Act

Identifiers
- IUPAC name: 2-(pyrrolidin-1-yl)-1-(5,6,7,8-tetrahydronaphthalen-2-yl)pentan-1-one
- CAS Number: 2304915-07-7
- PubChem CID: 132989549
- ChemSpider: 82954253
- UNII: S5MU9GV87C

Chemical and physical data
- Formula: C_{19}H_{27}NO
- Molar mass: 285.431 g·mol^{−1}
- 3D model (JSmol): Interactive image
- SMILES: CCCC(C(=O)C1=CC2=C(CCCC2)C=C1)N3CCCC3
- InChI: InChI=1S/C19H27NO/c1-2-7-18(20-12-5-6-13-20)19(21)17-11-10-15-8-3-4-9-16(15)14-17/h10-11,14,18H,2-9,12-13H2,1H3; Key:MMIKQWIZKBYLKZ-UHFFFAOYSA-N

TH-PVP is a substituted cathinone derivative which has been sold as a designer drug. It was first identified by a forensic laboratory in Hungary in 2015, but has subsequently been found in numerous other countries around the world including Spain, Belgium, Poland, Turkey, and Brazil.

Pharmacological studies in vitro showed it to inhibit reuptake of the monoamine neurotransmitters, with about 10-fold selectivity for serotonin over norepinephrine and dopamine, whereas the drug did not induce monoamine release. A subsequent study found that it showed similar potency for serotonin and dopamine but was markedly selective for reuptake inhibition of these neurotransmitters over norepinephrine. Despite its activity as a monoamine reuptake inhibitor, TH-PVP failed to produce stimulant effects in animals.

== See also ==
- Substituted methylenedioxyphenethylamine § Related compounds
- 3,4-Pr-PipVP
- 3-Me-PVP
- 4-Et-PVP
- 5-BPDi
- 6-APT
- EDMA
- Indapyrophenidone
- Naphyrone
- O-2390
