= Para-Nitroazaprocin =

para-Nitroazaprocin
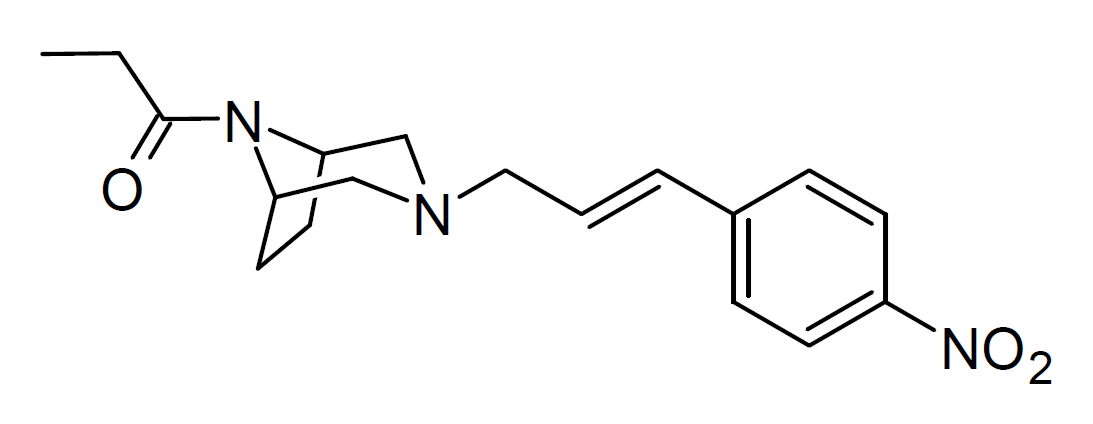

Legal status
- Legal status: UK: Class A

Identifiers
- IUPAC name: 1-[3-[(E)-3-(4-nitrophenyl)prop-2-enyl]-3,8-diazabicyclo[3.2.1]octan-8-yl]propan-1-one
- CAS Number: 59038-10-7
- PubChem CID: 9797552
- ChemSpider: 7973318

Chemical and physical data
- Formula: C_{18}H_{23}N_{3}O_{3}
- Molar mass: 329.400 g·mol^{−1}
- 3D model (JSmol): Interactive image
- SMILES: CCC(=O)N1C2CCC1CN(C2)C/C=C/C3=CC=C(C=C3)[N+](=O)[O-]
- InChI: InChI=1S/C18H23N3O3/c1-2-18(22)20-16-9-10-17(20)13-19(12-16)11-3-4-14-5-7-15(8-6-14)21(23)24/h3-8,16-17H,2,9-13H2,1H3/b4-3+; Key:WRILSPHRDWMEMQ-ONEGZZNKSA-N

para-Nitroazaprocin is an opioid designer drug which is the 4'-nitro derivative of azaprocin. It has around 25x the potency of morphine, and was made a Class A drug in the UK in May 2024.
