= Sunifiram =

Chemical compound

Clinical data
- Other names: DM-235

Legal status
- Legal status: US: Unapproved "New Drug" (as defined by 21 U.S. Code § 321(p)(1)). Use in dietary supplements, food, or medicine is unlawful; otherwise uncontrolled.

Identifiers
- IUPAC name: 1-Benzoyl-4-propanoylpiperazine
- CAS Number: 314728-85-3
- PubChem CID: 4223812
- ChemSpider: 3432996
- UNII: 66924E735K
- ChEMBL: ChEMBL309176
- CompTox Dashboard (EPA): DTXSID10400996

Chemical and physical data
- Formula: C_{14}H_{18}N_{2}O_{2}
- Molar mass: 246.310 g·mol^{−1}
- 3D model (JSmol): Interactive image
- SMILES: CCC(=O)N1CCN(CC1)C(=O)c2ccccc2
- InChI: InChI=1S/C14H18N2O2/c1-2-13(17)15-8-10-16(11-9-15)14(18)12-6-4-3-5-7-12/h3-7H,2,8-11H2,1H3; Key:DGOWDUFJCINDGI-UHFFFAOYSA-N

Sunifiram (developmental code name DM-235) is an experimental drug which has antiamnesic effects in animal studies and with significantly higher potency than piracetam. Sunifiram is a molecular simplification of unifiram (DM-232). Another analogue is sapunifiram (MN-19). As of 2016, sunifiram had not been subjected to toxicology testing, nor to any human clinical trials, and is not approved for use anywhere in the world.

== Pharmacology ==
The mechanism of action of sunifiram is unknown. Sunifiram, as well as unifiram, were assayed at a wide panel of sites, including the most important receptors, ion channels, and transporters, but showed no affinity for any of the sites. They specifically did not bind to the glutamate, GABA, serotonin, dopamine, adrenergic, histamine, acetylcholine, or opioid receptors at concentrations of up to 1 μM. In addition, the drugs were tested on recombinant AMPA receptors and showed no potentiation of the receptors, indicating that they do not act as AMPA receptor positive allosteric modulators. However, they were able to prevent the amnesia induced by the AMPA receptor antagonist NBQX in the passive avoidance test, suggesting that indirect/downstream AMPA receptor activation may be involved in their memory-enhancing effects. It is reported that sunifiram stimulates CaMKII and PKCα pathways, and that this action depends on the activation of glycine site of NMDA receptors.

Sunifiram, as well as other nootropics such as piracetam, levetiracetam, and aniracetam are able to antagonize inhibition of glucose transport by barbiturates (e.g., pentobarbital), diazepam, and certain other drugs in human erythrocytes in vitro (K_{i} = 26.0 uM for sunifiram), and this action has been found to correlate with their potency in reversing scopolamine-induced memory deficits in mice. However, this action has been regarded as very unlikely to represent the main mechanism of action of sunifiram.

== See also ==
- Bucinnazine
- NSI-189
