= Bucinnazine =

Opioid analgesic drug

Clinical data
- Other names: AP-237
- Drug class: Opioid

Legal status
- Legal status: UK: Under Psychoactive Substances Act; US: Schedule I

Identifiers
- IUPAC name: 1-[4-[(E)-3-Phenylprop-2-enyl]piperazin-1-yl]butan-1-one
- CAS Number: 17719-89-0 17730-82-4 (HCl)
- PubChem CID: 6005081
- ChemSpider: 4777510
- UNII: J735KL8O54

Chemical and physical data
- Formula: C_{17}H_{24}N_{2}O
- Molar mass: 272.392 g·mol^{−1}
- 3D model (JSmol): Interactive image
- SMILES: CCCC(=O)N1CCN(CC1)C/C=C/C2=CC=CC=C2
- InChI: InChI=1S/C17H24N2O/c1-2-7-17(20)19-14-12-18(13-15-19)11-6-10-16-8-4-3-5-9-16/h3-6,8-10H,2,7,11-15H2,1H3/b10-6+; Key:ZQBMUHABRSEAIK-UXBLZVDNSA-N

Bucinnazine (AP-237, 1-butyryl-4-cinnamylpiperazine) is an opioid analgesic drug that was widely used in China to treat pain in cancer patients as of 1986. It is one of the most potent compounds among a series of piperazine-amides first synthesized and reported in Japan in the 1970s. Bucinnazine has analgesic potency comparable to that of morphine, but with a relatively higher therapeutic index.

The drug was initially claimed to be a non-narcotic analgesic. However, subsequent studies have shown bucinnazine and similar acyl piperazines to be potent and selective agonists of μ-opioid receptor (MOR) with relatively low affinity for the δ-opioid receptor and the κ-opioid receptor. In accordance with these studies, results from the intravenous self-administration experiments in rats showed that bucinnazine has a marked reinforcing effect with tolerance and dependence quickly developing. In addition, the opioid receptor antagonist naloxone reverses the effect of bucinnazine and precipitates withdrawal symptoms in bucinnazine treated rats further indicating a mechanism of analgesia mediated via selective agonist activity at μ-opioid receptors.

== Derivatives ==
2-Methyl-AP-237 has been sold on the grey market as a designer opioid, first identified by a police forensic laboratory in Slovenia in March 2019. In 2023, the United States Department of Justice took criminal action against two individuals for selling 2-Methyl-AP-237 under the false pretenses that such product was intended for 'research purposes' only. One of the pair was sentenced to five years in federal prison.

The WHO and the Ministry of Social Affairs, Health, Care and Consumer Protection have published reports on 2-Methyl-AP-237. According to their analysis, it is a little bit less potent than fentanyl and can be reversed using naltrexone. There haven't been any studies on its systemic toxicity but there have been overdose deaths linked to it, most in combination with other drugs. It is primarily consumed orally or through snorting. While the methyl substitution creates a stereocenter, the drug is sold as the racemate.

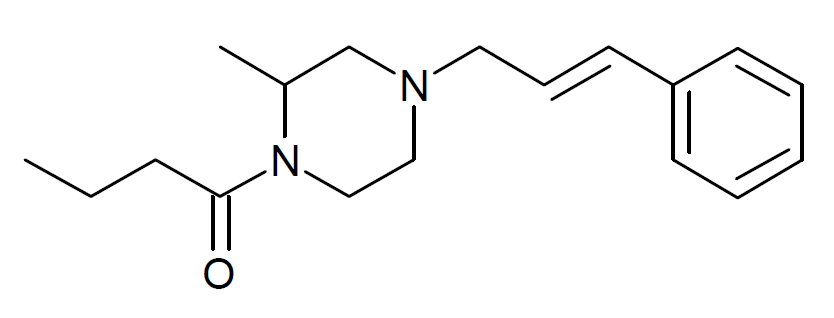
2-Methyl-AP-237; CAS# 98608-59-4; PubChem 6447698

== See also ==
- AP-238
- Azaprocin
- Diphenpipenol
- MT-45
- Sunifiram
