= Diphenpipenol =

Chemical compound

Clinical data
- ATC code: None

Identifiers
- IUPAC name: 3-[2-[4-(2-methoxyphenyl)piperazin-1-yl]-2-phenylethyl]phenol
- CAS Number: 83374-54-3
- PubChem CID: 13236269
- ChemSpider: 15325002
- UNII: ZK4VB64WSR
- ChEMBL: ChEMBL1189795
- CompTox Dashboard (EPA): DTXSID901336845

Chemical and physical data
- Formula: C_{25}H_{28}N_{2}O_{2}
- Molar mass: 388.511 g·mol^{−1}
- 3D model (JSmol): Interactive image
- SMILES: COc4ccccc4N1CCN(CC1)C(Cc2cccc(O)c2)c3ccccc3
- InChI: InChI=1S/C25H28N2O2/c1-29-25-13-6-5-12-23(25)26-14-16-27(17-15-26)24(21-9-3-2-4-10-21)19-20-8-7-11-22(28)18-20/h2-13,18,24,28H,14-17,19H2,1H3; Key:ILCZMFSACNEMGK-UHFFFAOYSA-N

Diphenpipenol is an opioid analgesic drug invented in the 1970s by Dainippon Pharmaceutical Co. It is chemically a 1-substituted-4-(1,2-diphenylethyl)piperazine derivative related to compounds such as MT-45 and AD-1211, but diphenpipenol is the most potent compound in the series, with the more active (S) enantiomer being around 105 times the potency of morphine in animal studies. This makes it a similar strength to fentanyl and its analogues, and consequently diphenpipenol can be expected to pose a significant risk of producing life-threatening respiratory depression, as well as other typical opioid side effects such as sedation, itching, nausea and vomiting.

Diphenpipenol has been offered for sale online as a designer drug, though analysis of a sample of supposed diphenpipenol found it to instead contain a structural isomer with much weaker opioid activity, and it is unclear if genuine diphenpipenol has actually been sold.

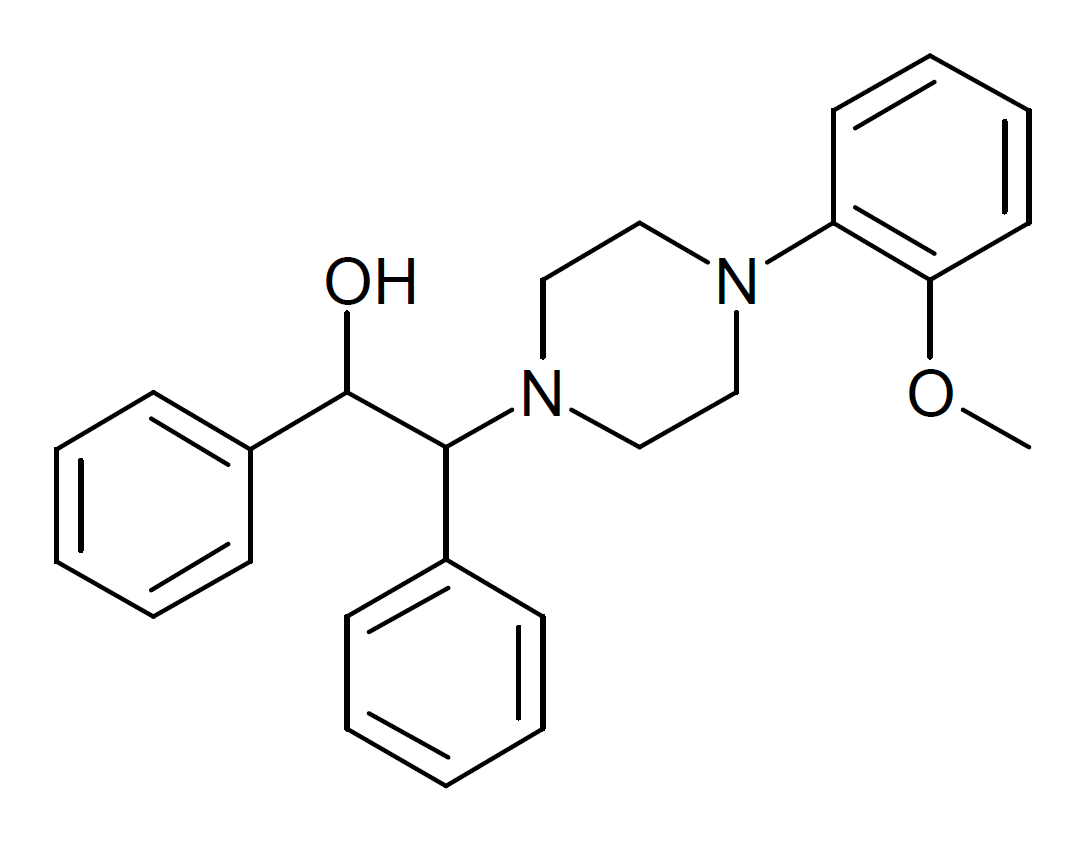
Alternate isomer sold as diphenpipenol

== See also ==
- 3C-PEP
- Azaprocin
- Bucinnazine
- Diphenidine
- Lefetamine
