= Unifiram =

Chemical compound

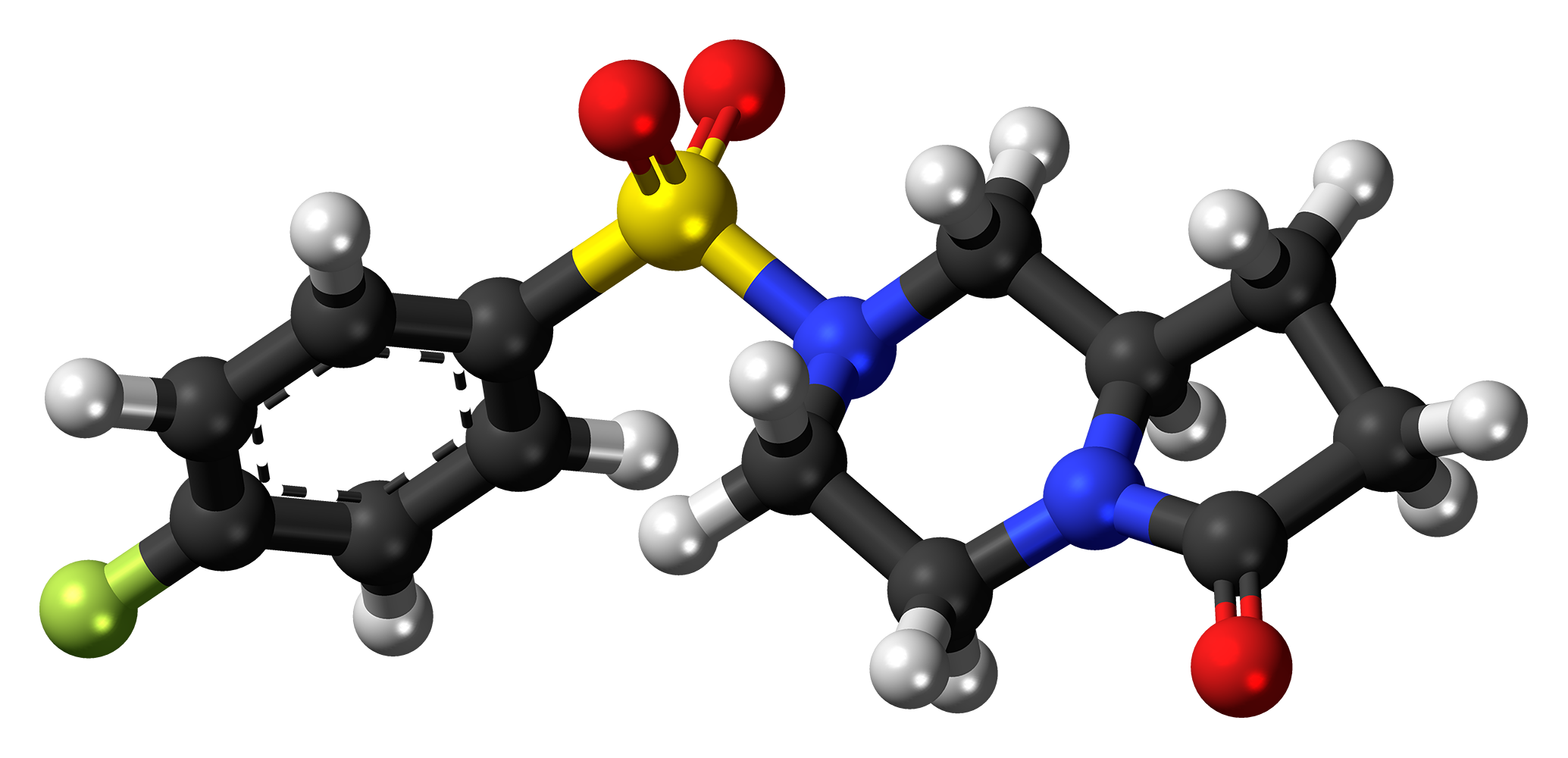

Clinical data
- Other names: DM-232

Legal status
- Legal status: In general: unscheduled

Identifiers
- IUPAC name: 2-[(4-Fluorophenyl)sulfonyl]hexahydropyrrolo[1,2-a]pyrazin-6(2H)-one
- CAS Number: 272786-64-8
- PubChem CID: 9861054
- ChemSpider: 8036753
- UNII: N4024LN29G
- ChEMBL: ChEMBL140717
- CompTox Dashboard (EPA): DTXSID00432024

Chemical and physical data
- Formula: C_{13}H_{15}FN_{2}O_{3}S
- Molar mass: 298.33 g·mol^{−1}
- 3D model (JSmol): Interactive image
- SMILES: C2CN1C(=O)CCC1CN2S(=O)(=O)c(cc3)ccc3F
- InChI: InChI=1S/C13H15FN2O3S/c14-10-1-4-12(5-2-10)20(18,19)15-7-8-16-11(9-15)3-6-13(16)17/h1-2,4-5,11H,3,6-9H2; Key:SNRTZFZAFBIBJP-UHFFFAOYSA-N

Unifiram (developmental code name DM-232) is an experimental drug. that has antiamnesic and other effects in animal studies with far greater potency than piracetam. A number of related compounds are known, such as sunifiram (DM-235) and sapunifiram (MN-19). Unifiram has two enantiomers, with the dextro form being the more active isomer. It has been shown to reduce the duration of hypnosis induced by pentobarbital, without impairing motor coordination. As of 2015, no formal human studies with unifiram have been conducted. Unifiram is not patented and, despite the lack of human and long-term toxicity studies, it is commonly sold online.

== Pharmacology ==
Unifiram, as well as sunifiram, were assayed at a wide panel of sites, including the most important receptors, ion channels, and transporters, but showed no affinity for any of the sites. They specifically did not bind to the glutamate, GABA, serotonin, dopamine, adrenergic, histamine, acetylcholine, or opioid receptors at concentrations of up to 1 μM. In addition, the drugs were tested on recombinant AMPA receptors and showed no potentiation of the receptors, indicating that they do not act as AMPA receptor positive allosteric modulators. However, they were able to prevent the amnesia induced by the AMPA receptor antagonist NBQX in the passive avoidance test, suggesting that indirect/downstream AMPA receptor activation may be involved in their memory-enhancing effects.

== Chemistry ==
(R)-(+)-unifiram (dextrounifiram).
