= 3,4-Pr-PipVP =

Chemical compound

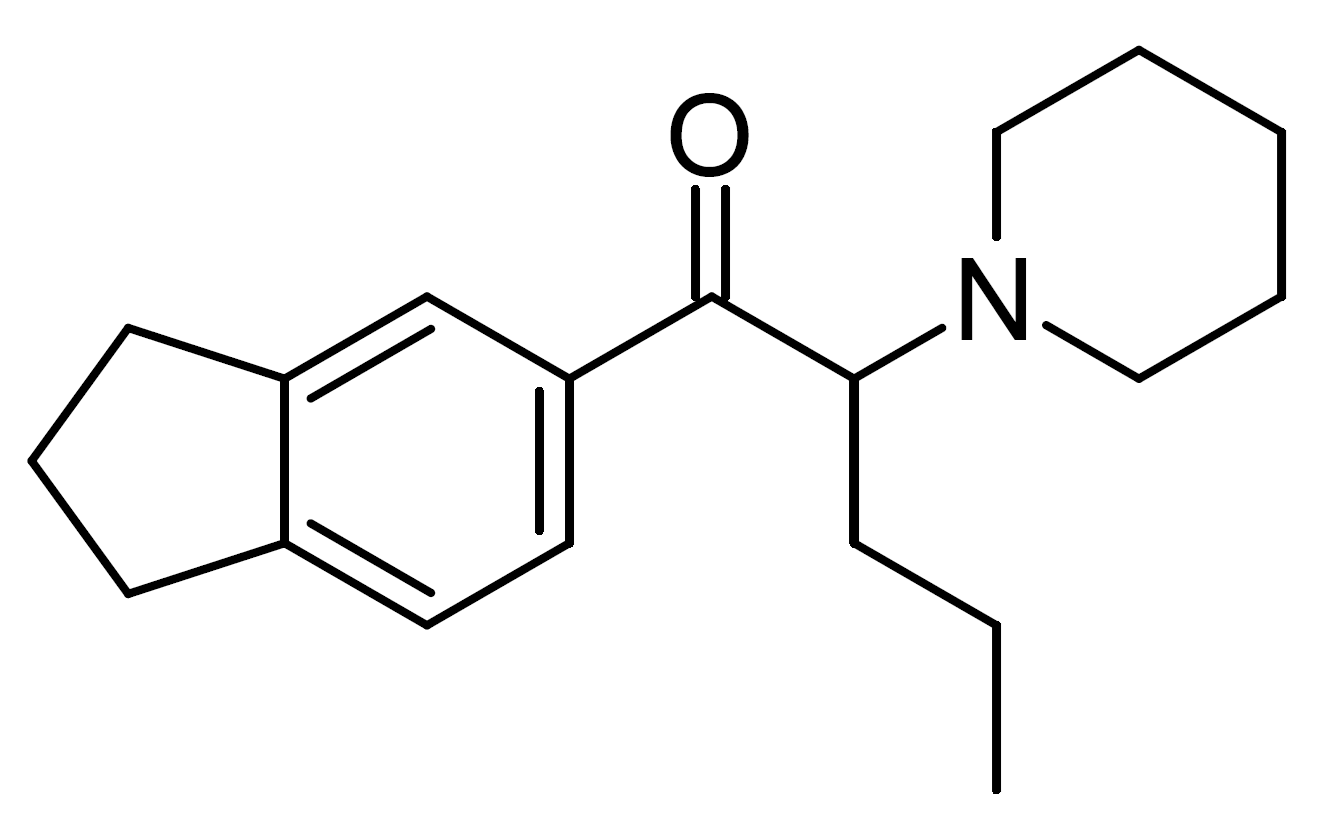

Legal status
- Legal status: DE: Anlage II (Authorized trade only, not prescriptible); UK: Class B

Identifiers
- IUPAC name: 1-(2,3-dihydro-1H-inden-5-yl)-2-piperidin-1-ylpentan-1-one
- PubChem CID: 168310517

Chemical and physical data
- Formula: C_{19}H_{27}NO
- Molar mass: 285.431 g·mol^{−1}
- 3D model (JSmol): Interactive image
- SMILES: CCCC(C(=O)C1=CC2=C(CCC2)C=C1)N3CCCCC3
- InChI: InChI=1S/C19H27NO/c1-2-7-18(20-12-4-3-5-13-20)19(21)17-11-10-15-8-6-9-16(15)14-17/h10-11,14,18H,2-9,12-13H2,1H3; Key:XCBQKBNQNYAXPN-UHFFFAOYSA-N

3,4-Pr-PipVP is a substituted cathinone derivative with stimulant effects which has been sold as a designer drug.

== 3,4-EtPV ==
3,4-EtPV
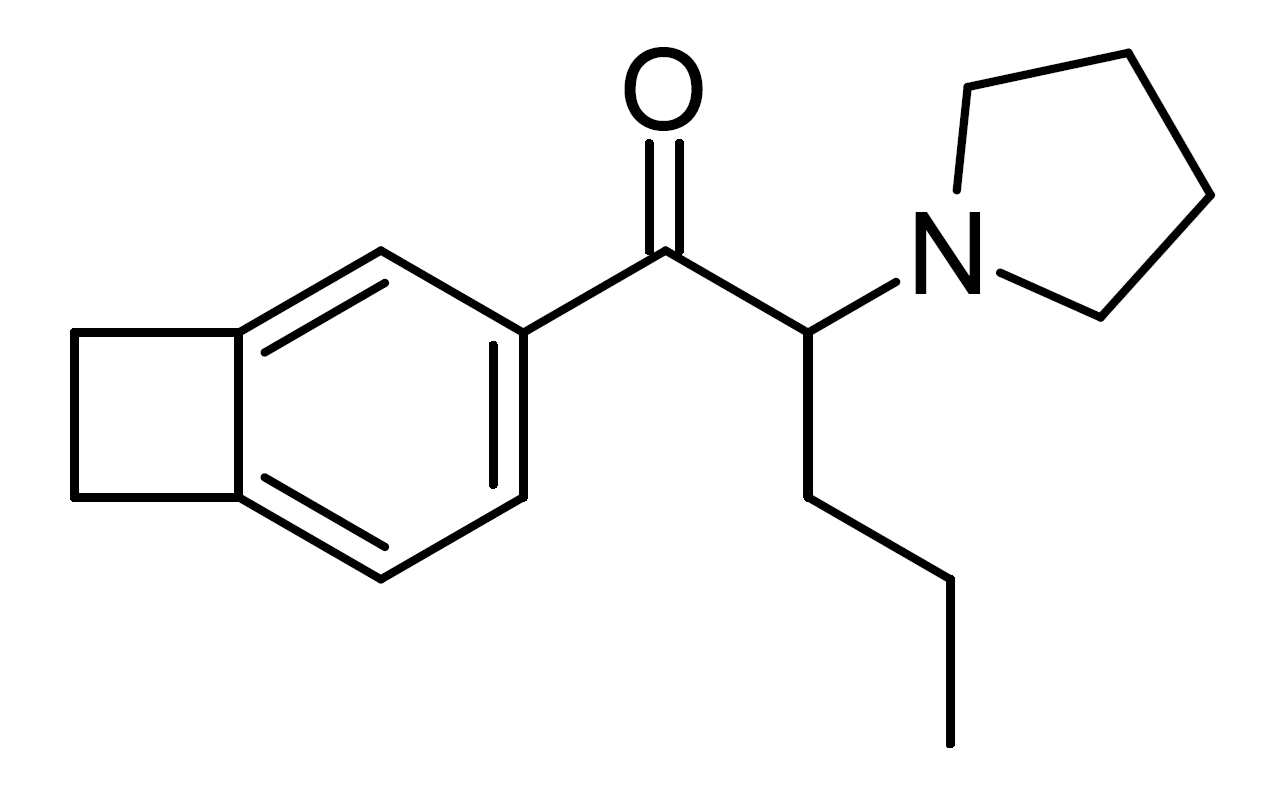

Legal status
- Legal status: DE: legal

Identifiers
- IUPAC name: 1-(bicyclo[4.2.0]octa-1,3,5-trien-3-yl)-2-(pyrrolidin-1-yl)pentan-1-one
- PubChem CID: 172871868

Chemical and physical data
- Formula: C_{17}H_{23}NO
- Molar mass: 257.377 g·mol^{−1}
- 3D model (JSmol): Interactive image
- SMILES: O=C(C(CCC)N1CCCC1)c1ccc2CCc2c1
- InChI: InChI=InChI=1S/C17H23NO/c1-2-5-16(18-10-3-4-11-18)17(19)15-9-7-13-6-8-14(13)12-15/h7,9,12,16H,2-6,8,10-11H2,1H3; Key:GJPHTMBPBAUZGR-UHFFFAOYSA-N

3,4-Pr-PipVP was marketed online since 2021 as 3,4-EtPV, which is not covered by the controlled drug analogue laws in some jurisdictions such as Germany and Holland. However, while genuine 3,4-EtPV can be made and is now available from analytical suppliers as a reference standard, the benzocyclobutene ring system is relatively unstable and the synthesis is challenging, and all samples of supposed 3,4-EtPV that were tested proved to be 3,4-Pr-PipVP, until July 2024 when a genuine sample of 3,4-EtPV was finally identified in Germany.

== See also ==
- 4-Et-PVP
- 5-BPDi
- TCB-2
- TH-PVP
- Indapyrophenidone
