= Bruylants reaction =

In organic chemistry, the Bruylants reaction (sometimes misspelled Bruylant) is a substitution reaction in which a Grignard reagent replaces a nitrile on a carbon that also has an amino group (c.f. cyanohydrin). It is useful for synthesizing phencyclidine and related dissociative anesthetics.

Unlike a traditional Grignard reaction where the nucleophile attacks the nitrile carbon, here the nitrile itself is lost as a leaving group. The reaction is named for Pierre Bruylants (1855–1950), who first reported it in 1924.

The reaction mechanism appears to involve ejection of the nitrile to form an iminium that is then attacked by the Grignard rather than a direct displacement such as an S_{N}2 reaction. This accounts for the importance of the alpha amino group and the absence of stereoselectivity on chiral reaction sites.

== Modifications ==
1,2,3-Triazole and related heterocycles have been used as safer alternatives to the nitrile, as they avoid the typical use of cyanide to form the nitrile.

Organolithium reagents can be used instead of the magnesium-halide Grignard reagents, though they are more prone than Grignards to attack the nitrile itself.
