= Ciprefadol =

Opioid analgesic drug

Clinical data
- ATC code: none

Identifiers
- IUPAC name: 3-[(4aR,8aR)-2-(cyclopropylmethyl)-1,3,4,5,6,7,8,8a-octahydroisoquinolin-4a-yl]phenol
- CAS Number: 59889-36-0
- PubChem CID: 333483
- ChemSpider: 295505
- UNII: L6RFK0CJ8K
- ChEMBL: ChEMBL2111073
- CompTox Dashboard (EPA): DTXSID00208605

Chemical and physical data
- Formula: C_{19}H_{27}NO
- Molar mass: 285.431 g·mol^{−1}
- 3D model (JSmol): Interactive image
- SMILES: C1CC[C@]2(CCN(C[C@@H]2C1)CC3CC3)C4=CC(=CC=C4)O
- InChI: InChI=1S/C19H27NO/c21-18-6-3-5-16(12-18)19-9-2-1-4-17(19)14-20(11-10-19)13-15-7-8-15/h3,5-6,12,15,17,21H,1-2,4,7-11,13-14H2/t17-,19-/m0/s1; Key:KFIQKMINEHFZSM-HKUYNNGSSA-N

Ciprefadol is an opioid analgesic that is an isoquinoline derivative most closely related to cyclazocine and picenadol, with a number of other related compounds known. Ciprefadol is a mixed agonist–antagonist at μ-opioid receptors and can partly block the effects of morphine at low doses, though at higher doses it acts more like a full agonist. It is also a potent κ-opioid agonist, unlike the corresponding N-methyl and N-phenethyl derivatives which are reasonably μ-selective agonists.
