= JNJ-20788560 =

Opioid selective for the delta receptor

Names
- IUPAC name 9-[(1S,5R)-8-Azabicyclo[3.2.1]octan-3-ylidene]-N,N-diethylxanthene-3-carboxamide

Identifiers
CAS Number	825649-28-3
3D model (JSmol)	Interactive image
ChemSpider	28189733
PubChem CID	72710739
UNII	99HYH9K6MZ
- InChI: InChI=1S/C25H28N2O2/c1-3-27(4-2)25(28)16-9-12-21-23(15-16)29-22-8-6-5-7-20(22)24(21)17-13-18-10-11-19(14-17)26-18/h5-9,12,15,18-19,26H,3-4,10-11,13-14H2,1-2H3/t18-,19+ Key: MISSUZBVOCUXTG-KDURUIRLSA-N
- SMILES: CCN(CC)C(=O)C1=CC2=C(C=C1)C(=C3CC4CCC(C3)N4)C5=CC=CC=C5O2

Properties
Chemical formula	C_{25}H_{28}N_{2}O_{2}
Molar mass	388.511 g·mol^{−1}
- Except where otherwise noted, data are given for materials in their standard state (at 25 °C [77 °F], 100 kPa). Infobox references

JNJ-20788560 is a potent opioid drug selective for the delta opioid receptor.

== Mechanism of action ==
It works by activating opioid receptors, but it is selective for the δ-opioid receptor. This selectivity allows this drug to have less side effects than opioids such as morphine.

Tests have revealed that JNJ-20788560 does not produce hypoventilation, tolerance, or physical dependence.
