= Zylofuramine =

Chemical compound

Clinical data
- ATC code: none

Identifiers
- IUPAC name: (1R)-N-Ethyl-2-phenyl-1-[(2R)-tetrahydrofuran-2-yl]ethanamine
- CAS Number: 3563-92-6
- PubChem CID: 71129
- ChemSpider: 64277
- UNII: 8N66VC535R
- CompTox Dashboard (EPA): DTXSID20912313

Chemical and physical data
- Formula: C_{14}H_{21}NO
- Molar mass: 219.328 g·mol^{−1}
- 3D model (JSmol): Interactive image
- SMILES: O2[C@@H]([C@H](NCC)Cc1ccccc1)CCC2
- InChI: InChI=1S/C14H21NO/c1-2-15-13(14-9-6-10-16-14)11-12-7-4-3-5-8-12/h3-5,7-8,13-15H,2,6,9-11H2,1H3/t13-,14-/m1/s1; Key:DOFCLOLKFGSRTG-ZIAGYGMSSA-N

Zylofuramine is a stimulant drug. It was developed in 1961, and was intended for use as an appetite suppressant and for the treatment of senile dementia in the elderly, but there is little information about it and it does not appear to have ever been marketed.

Its chemical structure has a similarity to other N-ethyl substituted stimulant drugs such as ethylamphetamine and N-ethylhexedrone.

== Synthesis ==

The Grignard reaction of benzylmagnesium bromide (1) and the imine of furfural and ethylamine, N-ethylfuran-2-methaneimine (2), gives the amine derivative (3). Hydrogenation using a Raney nickel catalyst yields zylofuramine.
