= 5-BPDi =

Chemical compound

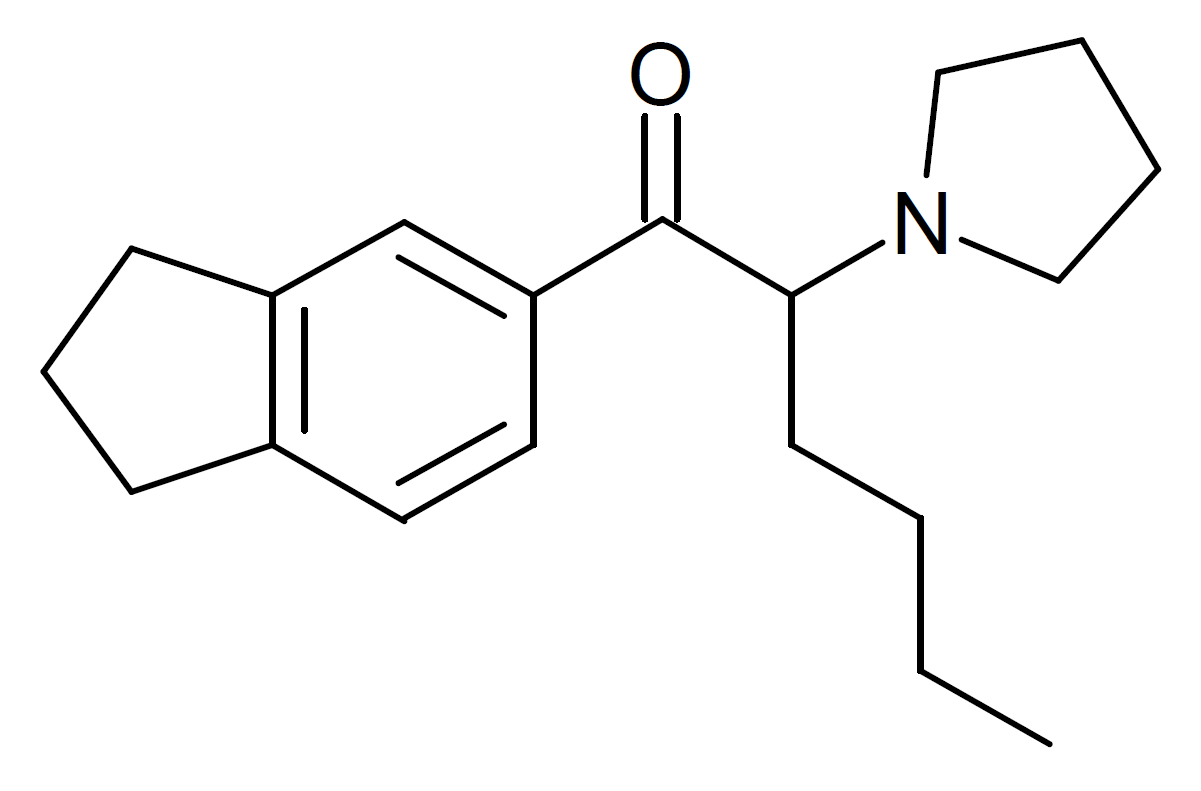

Legal status
- Legal status: DE: Anlage II (Authorized trade only, not prescriptible); UK: Class B

Identifiers
- IUPAC name: 1-(2,3-dihydro-1H-inden-5-yl)-2-pyrrolidin-1-ylhexan-1-one
- CAS Number: 2748304-63-2
- PubChem CID: 132989236
- ChemSpider: 129433295
- UNII: AJE4Z9D96B

Chemical and physical data
- Formula: C_{19}H_{27}NO
- Molar mass: 285.431 g·mol^{−1}
- 3D model (JSmol): Interactive image
- SMILES: CCCCC(C(=O)C1=CC2=C(CCC2)C=C1)N3CCCC3
- InChI: InChI=1S/C19H27NO/c1-2-3-9-18(20-12-4-5-13-20)19(21)17-11-10-15-7-6-8-16(15)14-17/h10-11,14,18H,2-9,12-13H2,1H3; Key:WETQQOQCDBNIKE-UHFFFAOYSA-N

5-BPDi (Indanyl-α-PHP) is a substituted cathinone derivative with stimulant effects which has been sold as a designer drug, first reported in 2015.

== See also ==
- 3,4-Pr-PipVP
- TH-PVP
- Indapyrophenidone
- MDPHP
- Naphyrone
