= Azaprocin =

Opioid analgesic drug

Clinical data
- ATC code: none

Identifiers
- IUPAC name: 1-(3-((E)-3-Phenylprop-2-enyl)-3,8-diazabicyclo[3.2.1]octan-8-yl)propan-1-one
- CAS Number: 140844-23-1
- PubChem CID: 6433185
- ChemSpider: 16736583
- UNII: D20F1K1BYP
- ChEMBL: ChEMBL2105901
- CompTox Dashboard (EPA): DTXSID20161480

Chemical and physical data
- Formula: C_{18}H_{24}N_{2}O
- Molar mass: 284.403 g·mol^{−1}
- 3D model (JSmol): Interactive image
- Melting point: 170 to 175 °C (338 to 347 °F)
- SMILES: CCC(N1[C@@H]2CC[C@H]1CN(C2)C/C=C/C3=CC=CC=C3)=O
- InChI: InChI=1S/C18H24N2O/c1-2-18(21)20-16-10-11-17(20)14-19(13-16)12-6-9-15-7-4-3-5-8-15/h3-9,16-17H,2,10-14H2,1H3/b9-6+/t16-,17+; Key:RKNSPEOBXHFNTD-DQCUJPBYSA-N

Azaprocin is a drug which is an opioid analgesic with approximately ten times the potency of morphine, and a fast onset and short duration of action. It was discovered in 1963, but has never been marketed.

Para-nitroazaprocin, the derivative substituted on the phenyl ring with a p-nitro group, is more potent than the parent compound, around 25× the potency of morphine. The ring-opened 2,6-dimethylpiperazine analogues are also active, and a large family of opioid analgesic compounds derived from this parent structure have been developed over the last 40 years. One analogue, AP-237, has been used in China to treat the pain caused by cancer.
