= Remacemide =

Chemical compound

Clinical data
- Trade names: Ecovia
- Other names: (±)-2-amino-N-[1,2-di(phenyl)propan-2-yl]acetamide PR 934-423
- Routes of administration: By mouth
- ATC code: none

Identifiers
- IUPAC name: N-(1-methyl-1,2-diphenylethyl)glycinamide
- CAS Number: 128298-28-2
- PubChem CID: 60511
- ChemSpider: 54551
- UNII: EH6763C1IC
- CompTox Dashboard (EPA): DTXSID601030460 DTXSID6048250, DTXSID601030460

Chemical and physical data
- Formula: C_{17}H_{20}N_{2}O
- Molar mass: 268.360 g·mol^{−1}
- 3D model (JSmol): Interactive image
- SMILES: CC(CC1=CC=CC=C1)(C2=CC=CC=C2)NC(=O)CN
- InChI: InChI=1S/C17H20N2O/c1-17(19-16(20)13-18,15-10-6-3-7-11-15)12-14-8-4-2-5-9-14/h2-11H,12-13,18H2,1H3,(H,19,20); Key:YSGASDXSLKIKOD-UHFFFAOYSA-N

Remacemide is a drug which acts as a low-affinity NMDA antagonist with sodium channel blocking properties. It has been studied for the treatment of acute ischemic stroke, epilepsy, Huntington's disease, and Parkinson's disease.

Because remacemide has only a modest effect on seizure frequency and causes dizziness, it is no longer believed that remacemide will be an effective treatment for epilepsy. Although no such statement has been made about remacemide's potential for treating stroke, Huntington's, or Parkinson's, remacemide is no longer being developed for these conditions.

Remacemide is also known as remacemide hydrochloride, (±)-2-amino-N-(1-methyl-1,2-diphenylethyl)-acetamide hydrochloride, or FPL 12924AA.

== Adverse effects ==
- dizziness
- nausea

=== Lack of adverse effects ===
Unlike many other treatments for epilepsy, remacemide does not appear to impair cognitive performance or driving performance in humans, although the evidence for effects on cognitive performance in animals has been mixed. Remacemide is not a sedative.

== Toxicity ==
The median toxic dose of remacemide for neural impairment tests in mice is 5.6 mg/kg. Its estimated median lethal dose is about 927.3 mg/kg in mice. It has a favorable therapeutic index of 28.1 in mice.

== Drug interactions ==
=== Levodopa ===
Remacemide delays the absorption of levodopa (300 mg of remacemide one hour before levodopa treatment delays mean time to peak levodopa plasma concentration by 20%) but not its total absorption (area-under-the-curve for levodopa plasma concentration was unchanged).

=== Sodium valproate ===
Remacemide does not interact with sodium valproate, a treatment for epilepsy.

=== Carbamazepine ===
Ramacemide does interact with carbamazepine. Remacemide inhibits the metabolism of carbamazepine, while carbamazepine induces the metabolism of remacemide and FPL 12495.

=== Alcohol ===
Combined consumption with alcohol can increase reaction time and lower alertness, while also hindering memory formation, which are typical side effects of alcohol.

== Remacemide salts ==
Remacemide is most commonly synthesized as the salt remacemide hydrochloride. However, there has been some investigation into other remacemide salts and their crystals, as different remacemide salts might taste more pleasant or have a solubility more suitable for a pediatric suspension formulation.

== Mechanism of action ==
Remacemide binds weakly and noncompetitively to the ionic channel site of the NMDA receptor complex. Remacemide binds both allosterically and in the channel. However, because remacemide binds so weakly to NMDAR, much of remacemide's in vivo effect against excitotoxicity is thought to be caused by its metabolic transformation to the more potent desglycine derivative FPL 12495. That is, remacemide may actually act as a prodrug to deliver the active metabolite FPL 12495 to the central nervous system.

=== Epilepsy ===
In a well validated and described genetic model of absence epilepsy, rats of the WAG/Rij strain, remacemide and its metabolite FPL 12495 were found to have a common for glutamate antagonist usual effect on the number of spike/wave dischargesEEG, the drugs decrease spike/wave discharges dose dependently. However, in contrast to most other glutamate antagonists, FPL 12495 increased the duration of the spike-wave discharges.

== Pharmacokinetics ==
=== Blood–brain barrier ===
The brain uptake index (BUI), a measure of a drug's ability to pass the blood–brain barrier that involves the injection of radiolabeled test and reference substances into the common carotid artery of anesthetized animals, for remacemide is 51 ± 0.9 SD.

== Enantiomers ==
The (-)stereoisomer of remacemide is of equal potency to the racemic mixture in preventing maximal electroshock seizures when administered orally to rats, while the (+)stereoisomer is less potent.

== Metabolites ==
=== FPL 12495 ===
Much of remacemide's effect in vivo is thought to be caused by the desglycine derivative FPL 12495 (±). FPL 12495 (±) binds specifically and non-competitively to NMDAR. Its effect on maximal electroconvulsive shock is more potent than remacemide. The S isomer (FPL 12859) is the more potent isomer.

FPL 12495 is sometimes referred to as ARL 12495AA.

=== Other metabolites ===
==== FPL 15053 ====
FPL 15053 is the N-hydroxy-desglycinate of remacemide, and exhibits modest binding to NMDAR and modest effects on convulsions and mortality in test mice and rats.

==== FPL 14331 and FPL 14465 ====
FPL 14331 and FPL 14465 are the p-hydroxy-desglycinates of remacemide, and they exhibit some efficacy against maximal electroconvulsive shock after i.p. and i.v. dosing.

==== FPL 15455 ====
FPL 15455 is an oxoacetate metabolite of remacemide, but has no demonstrated biological activity.

==== FPL 14991 and FPL 14981 ====
FPL 14991 and FPL 14981 are both β-Miydroxy-desglycinates of remacemide, and they display modest efficacy against maximal electroconvulsive shock in mice. However FPL 14981 and not FPL 14991 prevents NMDLA-induced convulsions and mortality in mice.

==== FPL 13592 and FPL 15112 ====
The hydroxy-methyl derivative of remacemide (FPL 13592) and its desglycinate (FPL 15112) prevents electric shock-induced convulsions only after i.v. administration; only the desglycine derivative binds to NMDAR.

==== FPL 14467 ====
FPL 14467 (p-dihydroxy-desglycine) is inactive in vivo and weak in binding NMDAR.

== Pharmacodynamics ==
The values for 50% displacement of [^{3}H]MK801 were 68 μM for remacemide and 0.48 μM for FPL 12495AA.

== History ==
=== Current status ===
Remacemide is an experimental drug most recently being developed by the British multinational pharmaceutical company AstraZeneca. However, there has been little news of its progress since 2000. A few sources indicate that its development has been discontinued.

=== Changing hands ===
Remacemide was one of the last drugs under development by the now-defunct English pharmaceutical company Fisons. In 1995, it was acquired along with most of Fisons' research and development operations by the Swedish pharmaceutical company Astra, which in 1999 merged with the British company Zeneca to form AstraZeneca. In 2000, AstraZeneca considered possibly licensing out remacemide to some other pharmaceutical company, but there has been little news about remacemide since then. Remacemide's development may have been discontinued in July 2001.

==== Discovery and development under Fisons ====
In 1990, researchers at Fisons found that remacemide acted as an anticonvulsant in mice and rats . Because of remacemide's potential as a neuroprotective agent through preventing glutamate toxicity, it was soon also under investigation as a treatment for Huntington's disease and Parkinson's disease.

==== Astra ====
By 1995, when Astra acquired remacemide, it was already in Phase IIb clinical development as an anti-epileptic drug and Phase I clinical development as a treatment for Huntington's .

==== AstraZeneca ====
By 1998, when Astra announced its merger with Zeneca, remacemide had progressed to Phase III trials for epilepsy and Phase II trials for Parkinson's disease, and Astra was also investigating its potential for treating neuropathic pain

In 1999, after the merger, AstraZeneca reported that they were investigating remacemide for its neuroprotective effects, and that they planned regulatory submissions for Huntington's disease in 2001 and for Parkinson's disease and epilepsy in 2003.

Remacemide, under the trade name Ecovia, was designated an orphan drug for the treatment of Huntington's disease by the FDA in March 2000.

Remacemide was last mentioned in AstraZeneca's reports on its R&D pipeline in 2000, when it was in Phase III clinical trials for remacemide in the treatment of Huntington's disease and Phase II for treatment of Parkinson's disease. At that time, the submission of a New Drug Application to the FDA and a marketing authorisation application to the CHMP was projected for Huntington's in 2001 and for Parkinson's after 2003, but there has been no news of such submission. In this report, it was also noted that remacemide was "under strategic review and a potential candidate for licensing activity" (see this external article about drug licensing.)

==== Current news ====
There are no clinical trials of remacemide in progress, according to the Huntington Study Group, and the Parkinson Study Group.

== Availability ==
Remacemide is an experimental drug not available to the public and not currently undergoing clinical trials.

== See also ==
- AD-1211
- Diphenidine
- Ephenidine
- Lanicemine
- Lefetamine
- Methoxphenidine (MXP)
- MT-45
