= AD-1211 =

Opioid analgesic drug

Clinical data
- Other names: AD-1211
- ATC code: none

Identifiers
- IUPAC name: 1-(3-Methyl-2-butenyl)-4-[(1R)-1-phenyl-2-(3-hydroxyphenyl)ethyl]piperazine
- CAS Number: 83374-58-7 61311-01-1 (R)-enantiomer
- PubChem CID: 173526
- ChemSpider: 26286944
- UNII: 7YT87DVF55
- CompTox Dashboard (EPA): DTXSID00997906

Chemical and physical data
- Formula: C_{23}H_{30}N_{2}O
- Molar mass: 350.506 g·mol^{−1}
- 3D model (JSmol): Interactive image
- SMILES: c1c(O)cccc1CC(c3ccccc3)N(CC2)CCN2C\C=C(\C)/C
- InChI: InChI=1S/C23H30N2O/c1-19(2)11-12-24-13-15-25(16-14-24)23(21-8-4-3-5-9-21)18-20-7-6-10-22(26)17-20/h3-11,17,23,26H,12-16,18H2,1-2H3/t23-/m1/s1; Key:WLHCNEPBQJOHKW-HSZRJFAPSA-N

AD-1211 is an opioid analgesic drug invented in the 1970s by Dainippon Pharmaceutical Co. It is chemically a 1-substituted-4-prenyl-piperazine derivative, which is structurally unrelated to most other opioid drugs. The (S)-enantiomers in this series are more active as opioid agonists, but the less active (R)-enantiomer of this compound, AD-1211, is a mixed agonist–antagonist at opioid receptors with a similar pharmacological profile to pentazocine, and has atypical opioid effects with little development of tolerance or dependence seen after extended administration in animal studies.

== See also ==
- Diphenidine
- Diphenpipenol
- Ephenidine
- Fluorolintane
- Lanicemine
- Lefetamine
- Methoxphenidine (MXP)
- MT-45
- Remacemide
- AH-7921
