= Lefetamine =

Chemical compound

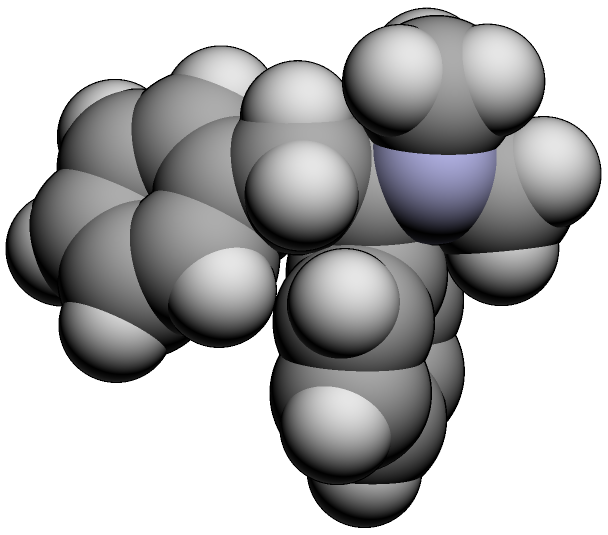

Clinical data
- Routes of administration: Oral
- ATC code: none

Legal status
- Legal status: AU: S4 (Prescription only); BR: Class B1 (Psychoactive drugs); CA: Schedule III; DE: Anlage I (Authorized scientific use only); UK: Class B; US: Schedule IV

Identifiers
- IUPAC name: (1R)-N,N-dimethyl-1,2-diphenylethanamine
- CAS Number: 7262-75-1
- PubChem CID: 443970
- ChemSpider: 392017
- UNII: 4J9726V5Y9
- CompTox Dashboard (EPA): DTXSID7046833

Chemical and physical data
- Formula: C_{16}H_{19}N
- Molar mass: 225.335 g·mol^{−1}
- 3D model (JSmol): Interactive image
- SMILES: CN([C@@H](C1=CC=CC=C1)CC2=CC=CC=C2)C
- InChI: InChI=1S/C16H19N/c1-17(2)16(15-11-7-4-8-12-15)13-14-9-5-3-6-10-14/h3-12,16H,13H2,1-2H3/t16-/m1/s1; Key:YEJZJVJJPVZXGX-MRXNPFEDSA-N

Lefetamine (Santenol) is a drug which is a stimulant and also an analgesic with effects comparable to codeine.

== Discovery ==
The parent structure of lefetamine, 1,2-diphenylethylamine was first synthesized in the 1940s and showed weak analgesic activity.

Lefetamine itself was first investigated in Japan in the 1950s. The L-isomer showed weak analgesic action comparable to codeine and antitussive action far weaker than codeine. The d-isomer showed no such activity but caused seizures in rats.

== Society and culture ==
It was abused in Japan during the 1950s. In a small study in 1989 it showed some effect against opioid withdrawal symptoms without causing withdrawal symptoms itself. It was concluded that it may be an opioid partial agonist.

It has been abused in Europe; in 1989 a small study of 15 abusers and some volunteers found that it had some partial similarity to opioids, that it produced withdrawal symptoms, and had dependence and abuse potential to a certain degree.

In a small study in 1994, it was compared to clonidine and buprenorphine in the detoxification of methadone patients and found to be inferior to both of them.

Regulation may vary; it does not appear as either a narcotic or non-narcotic under the US Controlled Substances Act 1970

The Canadian Controlled Drugs and Substances Act was amended in 2016 to include the substance as a Schedule III substance. Possession without legal authority can result in maximum 3 years imprisonment. Further, Health Canada amended the Food and Drug Regulations in May, 2016 to classify Lefetamine as a controlled drug.

== Research ==
Some related pyrrylphenylethanones had analgesic activity comparable to morphine. Some pyrrole analogues were reported to have analgesic effects comparable to lefetamine and being devoid of neurotoxic properties.

== See also ==
- Alpha-D2PV
- AD-1211
- Diphenidine
- Diphenpipenol
- Ephenidine
- Fluorolintane
- Lanicemine
- Methoxphenidine (MXP)
- MT-45
