= Zambon =

Italian pharmaceutical company

Zambon Company SpA
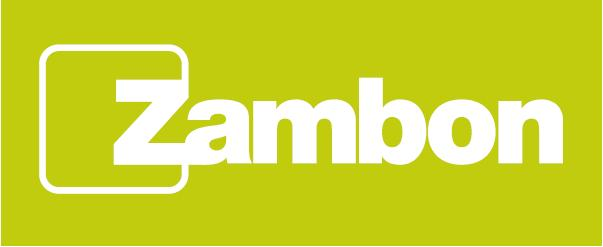
- Company type: Limited Company
- Industry: Pharmaceutical
- Founded: 1906 in Vicenza
- Founder: Gaetano Zambon and Silvio Farina
- Headquarters: Bresso, Italy
- Key people: Elena Zambon
- Revenue: € 801 million (2014)
- Number of employees: (2628 (2013))
- Website: www.zambongroup.com

Zambon is an Italian company that has been operating in the pharmaceutical and fine chemical industry since 1906. The company is currently run by Elena Zambon who is the granddaughter of the founder.

Headquartered in Bresso, in the Province of Milan, the company has business operations in three continents: Europe, South America and Asia. The company employs approximately 2,600 people in 15 countries and its integrated organisation consists of Zambon Company SpA, the industrial holding company for the group which comprises Zach System (fine chemicals), Zambon SpA (pharmaceuticals) and Z-Cube (Research Venture).

== History ==
=== Origins ===
Gaetano Zambon, founder of the group, was born in Malo in the Province of Vicenza on 31 December 1878. His father Giovanni owned a corn business.

Gaetano Zambon studied pharmacy at the University of Padua and graduated in 1902. Seeing the potential and growth of the pharmaceutical sector, he decided to sell products directly to pharmacies. Partnering with Silvio Farina, the two bought out the Rossi medical products warehouse on Corso Fogazzaro in Vicenza in August 1906 and officially founded the Magazzino Medicinali Zambon (Zambon Medical Products Warehouse) on 11 November 1906.

=== Establishment ===
The Warehouse distributed basic pharmaceutical products such as bismuth, iodine and bicarbonate, and also other commodities such as liquorice, spices and talcum powder. In 1908, the two partners established Gaetano Zambon & Co whose shares were divided equally between Gaetano, Silvio Farina and Teodorico Viero. In 1911, the business expanded over the entire region, forcing them to move to new offices.

=== The First World War ===
The outbreak of the First World War slowed business but did not halt it altogether. Gaetano Zambon provided services for the Military Medical Corps and during this period, partners Teodorico Viero, Silvio Farina and Arrigo Giacomelli expanded the company to include Giovanni Ferrari who also had a background in pharmaceuticals and sales.

=== The post-war period and establishment of ZeF ===
G. Zambon & Co. had a small plant that produced products for chemists such as Elixir di China (Elixir of Quinine), Ferrochina (iron and quinine citrate bitters), Rheum (rhubarb) and an insecticide called ITE. In 1920, Gaetano Zambon and his partners established their product lines, founding the first laboratory for speciality products and Galenic formulations, under the brand name ZeF (Zambon and Farina), for distribution to pharmacies and hospitals. In 1930, they bought an old fertiliser plant which was to become the company’s new pharmaceutical production facility. The first Synthetic Product Department was established in 1933, completing the pharmaceutical production process from raw material to finished product.

=== Zambon & Co. And the Second World War ===
In 1937, Gaetano Zambon and Silvio Farina were appointed Knights of the Order of the Crown of Italy and in 1938, after the departure of Teodorico from the company, they formed Zambon & C. Società Anonima per Azioni (Zambon & Co. Join Stock Company), and increasing the number of employees from 100 to 300 within a decade. During the Second World War, the factory suffered heavy bombing on 14 May 1944 and much of it was destroyed. The new Zambon plant was opened in September 1946, with the Minister of Foreign Trade, Pietro Campilli in attendance. Pharmaceuticals produced by Zambon were also sold abroad.

After the Second World War, the first generation of Zambon partners decided to hand over the reins to the younger generation. After parting ways with the Farina branch in 1951 and the Ferraris in 1957, Alberto Zambon took over the management of the company. Gaetano Zambon died in 1959 at the age of 81 years, and the company changed its name once more to Zambon SpA.

Alberto Zambon established good relationships in the United States and with a few large multinationals existing at that time, especially in the field of research, so that the company could develop its own pharmaceuticals rather than licensing them.

=== Internationalisation ===
The company expanded abroad, setting up both production facilities and commercial operations. They opened the first production plant in Brazil in 1956 under the name Zambon Laboratorios Farmaceuticos SA, which was changed to Ltda in 1993.

Zambon SA was established in Barcelona, Spain, in 1960 to serve the Iberian Peninsula (an independent Portuguese headquarters was opened in Lisbon, in 1992). The main brand of Zambon on the Spanish market is Ultra Levura, a probiotic treatment.

In 1961, Alberto Zambon moved the main headquarters and research laboratories to Bresso, Milan, while the production facility remained in Vicenza.

In 1963, Inpharzam was founded in Lamone, Switzerland, which served as a holding group for all the international businesses. This branch later moved to Cadempino, where a specialist pharmaceutical production plant was established. Davizam SA, Siphar and the Inpharzam Trading Company SA were also established in Lugano.

Founded in the same year, Zambon France focused on sales and exports to Africa and Australia.

Fluimicil went on the market in 1965. During this period, the company started to build relationships in Japan through a collaboration with EISAI, which produced injectable chloramphenicol in Japan.

A new chemical ingredients plant was built in Almisano di Lonigo in 1970.

In 1975, Zambon Colombia SA was established with headquarters in Bogota.

In 1980, Inpharzam International established relationships with various companies, including Carlo Erba.

In 1983, Zambon bought out Emilio Ghirardi’s company Simes and production was moved to a new plant in Vicenza in 1984. That same year, Zambon B.V. was founded with headquarters in Amsterdam and Zambon Nederland BV was established.

A year later, Alberto Zambon was appointed a Knight of the Order of Merit for Labour, exactly 50 years after his father’s nomination.

1989 saw the founding of both Zambon UK and Zambon Corporation for the American market.

In 1996, the Shantou Shanning Zambon Chemicals Ltd (Equity Joint Venture) was founded and its plant was opened a year later.

In Europe, Inpharzam SA was established in Belgium in 1995.

In 2000, a second Chinese plant was opened in Hainan, dividing chemical and pharmaceutical production between Shantou and Hainan. In 2002 Zambon India was established and Zambon Indonesia two years later.

The group invested in the respiratory field, especially in the treatment of severe diseases such as chronic obstructive pulmonary disease and rare illnesses, and in June 2013, Zambon acquired Profile Pharma in the United Kingdom, which specialised in cystic fibrosis. At the same time, Zambon entered the central nervous system therapy area with the molecule safinamide.

== Branches ==
- Italy
- Switzerland
- France
- Belgium
- England
- Germany
- Netherlands
- Spain
- Portugal
- Russia
- Brazil
- Colombia
- China
- India (in collaboration with ModiMundi Pharma Pvt Ltd)
- Indonesia
