= Fluorolintane =

Chemical compound

Legal status
- Legal status: DE: NpSG (Industrial and scientific use only); UK: Under Psychoactive Substances Act

Identifiers
- IUPAC name: 1-(1-(2-Fluorophenyl)-2-phenylethyl)pyrrolidine
- CAS Number: 2149042-90-8
- PubChem CID: 137332216
- ChemSpider: 58838621
- UNII: S8L5P832B3
- CompTox Dashboard (EPA): DTXSID101032423

Chemical and physical data
- Formula: C_{18}H_{20}FN
- Molar mass: 269.363 g·mol^{−1}
- 3D model (JSmol): Interactive image
- SMILES: FC1=C(C=CC=C1)C(CC2=CC=CC=C2)N3CCCC3
- InChI: InChI=1S/C18H20FN/c19-17-11-5-4-10-16(17)18(20-12-6-7-13-20)14-15-8-2-1-3-9-15/h1-5,8-11,18H,6-7,12-14H2; Key:ZAGWVXYVNFPCLW-UHFFFAOYSA-N

Fluorolintane (also known as 2-FPPP and 2-F-DPPy) is a dissociative anesthetic drug that has been sold online as a designer drug.

Fluorolintane and related diarylethylamines are antagonists of the NMDA receptor and have been studied in vitro as potential treatments for neurotoxic injury, depression and as sympathomimetic.

== See also ==
- AD-1211
- Alpha-D2PV
- Diphenidine
- Ephenidine
- Lanicemine
- Methoxphenidine (MXP)
- MT-45
- Prolintane
- Remacemide
