= MT-45 =

Chemical compound

Clinical data
- Other names: MT-45, IC-6
- Routes of administration: oral administration rectal administration
- ATC code: None

Legal status
- Legal status: BR: Class F1 (Prohibited narcotics); DE: Anlage II (Authorized trade only, not prescriptible); UK: Class A; US: Schedule I

Identifiers
- IUPAC name: 1-Cyclohexyl-4-(1,2-diphenylethyl)piperazine
- CAS Number: 52694-55-0 52694-52-7 (S) enantiomer
- PubChem CID: 431865
- ChemSpider: 381935
- UNII: Q2640DPW33
- KEGG: C22728
- CompTox Dashboard (EPA): DTXSID60961800

Chemical and physical data
- Formula: C_{24}H_{32}N_{2}
- Molar mass: 348.534 g·mol^{−1}
- 3D model (JSmol): Interactive image
- SMILES: c3ccccc3CC(c2ccccc2)N(CC1)CCN1C4CCCCC4
- InChI: InChI=1S/C24H32N2/c1-4-10-21(11-5-1)20-24(22-12-6-2-7-13-22)26-18-16-25(17-19-26)23-14-8-3-9-15-23/h1-2,4-7,10-13,23-24H,3,8-9,14-20H2; Key:IGBRRSIHEGCUEN-UHFFFAOYSA-N

MT-45 (IC-6) is an opioid analgesic drug invented in the 1970s by Dainippon Pharmaceutical Co. It is chemically a 1-substituted-4-(1,2-diphenylethyl) piperazine derivative, which is structurally unrelated to most other opioid drugs. Racemic MT-45 has around 80% the potency of morphine, with almost all opioid activity residing in the (S) enantiomer (the opposite stereochemistry from the related drug lefetamine). It has been used as a lead compound from which a large family of potent opioid drugs have been developed, including full agonists, partial agonists, and antagonists at the three main opioid receptor subtypes. Fluorinated derivatives of MT-45 such as 2F-MT-45 are significantly more potent as μ-opioid receptor agonists, and one of its main metabolites 1,2-diphenylethylpiperazine also blocks NMDA receptors.

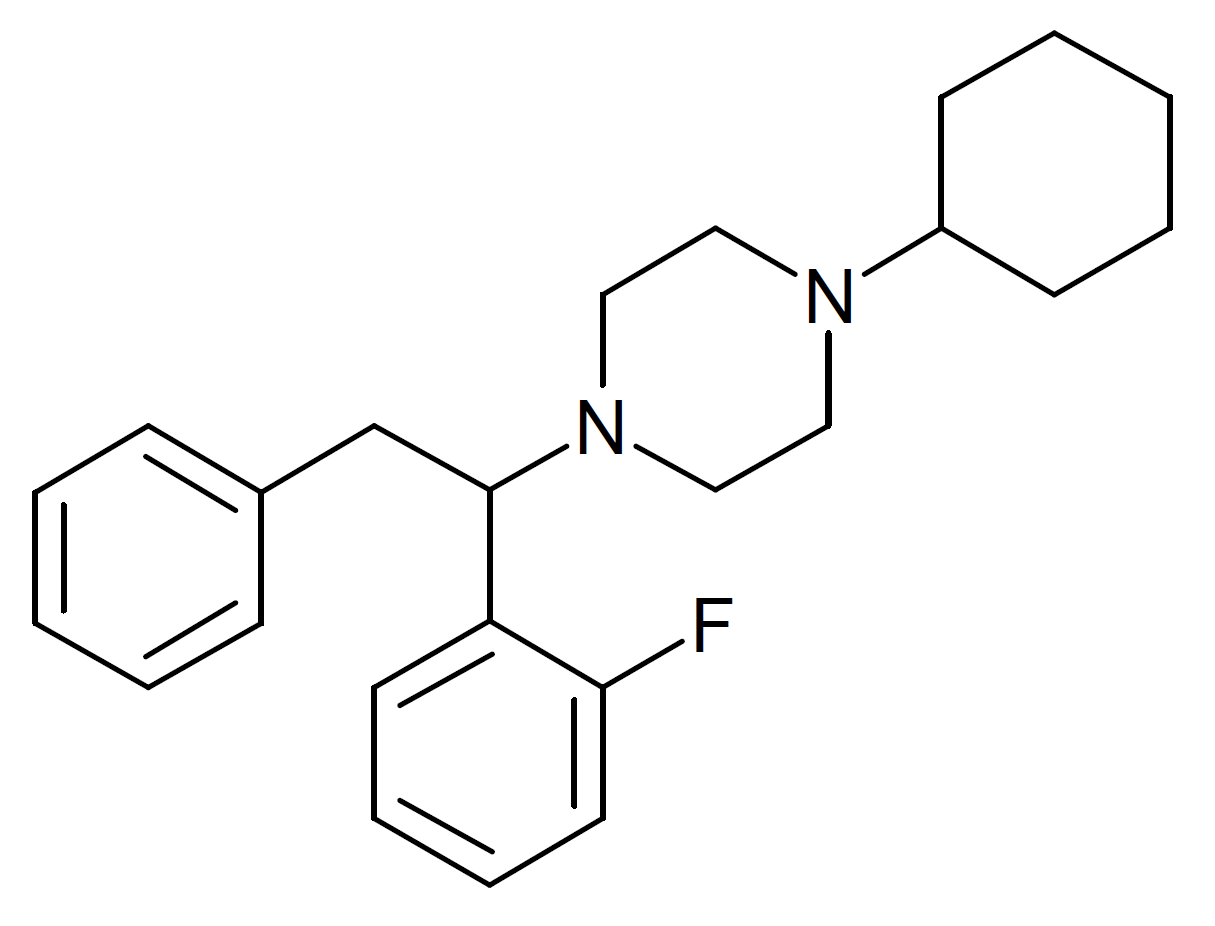
2F-MT-45.

== Side effects ==
Recreational use of MT-45 has been associated with unconsciousness and overdose, as well as a range of unusual side effects not typically seen with other opioid agonists, including hearing loss, hair depigmentation, alopecia, cataracts, and skin and nail reactions such as dermatitis and Mees lines. The cause for this is unclear, although a structural similarity to a withdrawn drug triparanol which caused similar side effects has been noted.

== Legality ==
MT-45 became a class A drug in the UK on 11 March 2015.

MT-45 is banned in the Czech Republic.

The Canadian Controlled Drugs and Substances Act was amended in 2016 to include the substance as a Schedule I substance. Possession without legal authority can result in maximum 7 years imprisonment. Further, Health Canada amended the Food and Drug Regulations in May 2016 to classify MT-45 as a restricted drug. Only those with a law enforcement agency, person with an exemption permit or institutions with Minister's authorization may possess the drug in Canada.

In the United States, the DEA placed MT-45 in Schedule 1 of the Controlled Substance Act. This took effect on January 12, 2018.

== See also ==
- AH-7921
- AD-1211
- AP-238
- Diphenidine
- Diphenpipenol
- Ephenidine
- Fluorolintane
- IC-26
- Lanicemine
- Lefetamine
- Methoxphenidine (MXP)
- Metonitazene
- Remacemide
