= Ephenidine =

Dissociative anesthetic designer drug

Legal status
- Legal status: AU: S9 (Prohibited substance); CA: Schedule I; DE: NpSG (Industrial and scientific use only); UK: Under Psychoactive Substances Act; Illegal in Sweden

Identifiers
- IUPAC name: N-Ethyl-1,2-diphenylethylamine
- CAS Number: 60951-19-1; HCl: 6272-97-5
- PubChem CID: 110821; HCl: 110820
- ChemSpider: 99470; HCl: 99469
- UNII: NG69VG2948
- CompTox Dashboard (EPA): DTXSID601032416

Chemical and physical data
- Formula: C_{16}H_{19}N
- Molar mass: 225.335 g·mol^{−1}
- 3D model (JSmol): Interactive image; HCl: Interactive image
- SMILES: CCNC(CC1=CC=CC=C1)C2=CC=CC=C2; HCl: CCNC(CC1=CC=CC=C1)C2=CC=CC=C2.Cl
- InChI: InChI=1S/C16H19N/c1-2-17-16(15-11-7-4-8-12-15)13-14-9-5-3-6-10-14/h3-12,16-17H,2,13H2,1H3; Key:IGFZMQXEKIZPDR-UHFFFAOYSA-N; HCl: InChI=1S/C16H19N.ClH/c1-2-17-16(15-11-7-4-8-12-15)13-14-9-5-3-6-10-14;/h3-12,16-17H,2,13H2,1H3;1H; Key:WOSDTAOMYCNNJE-UHFFFAOYSA-N

Ephenidine (also known as NEDPA and EPE) is a dissociative anesthetic that has been sold online as a designer drug. It is illegal in some countries as a structural isomer of the banned opioid drug lefetamine, but has been sold in countries where it is not banned.

== Pharmacology ==
=== Pharmacodynamics ===
Ephenidine and related diarylethylamines have been studied in vitro as treatments for neurotoxic injuries, and are antagonists of the NMDA receptor (K_{i} = 66.4 nM for ephenidine). Ephenidine also possesses weaker affinity for dopamine and norepinephrine transporters (379 nM and 841 nM, respectively) as well as σ_{1}R (629 nM) and σ_{2}R (722 nM) binding sites.

=== Metabolism ===
Ephenidine's metabolic pathway consists of N-oxidation, N-dealkylation, mono- and bis-hydroxylation of the benzyl ring, and hydroxylation of the phenyl ring only after N-dealkylation. The dihydroxy metabolites were conjugated by methylation of one hydroxy group, and hydroxy metabolites by glucuronidation or sulfation.

== Chemistry ==
Ephenidine reacts with reagent testing kits to give a semi-unique array of colors which can be used to aid its identification.

Final colors produced by reagent tests
Reagent	Reaction color
Marquis	Orange > Brown
Mandelin	Green
Liebermann	Deep red > Brown (fast)
Froehde	Light Yellow

== Society and culture ==
Sweden's public health agency suggested that ephenidine be classified as a hazardous substance on 1 June, 2015. Due to that suggestion, ephenidine became a scheduled substance, in Sweden, as of 18 August, 2015.

In 2016, Canada added MT-45 and "its salts, derivatives, isomers and analogues" to the Schedule I controlled substance list, and explicitly included ephenidine. Possession without legal authority can result in maximum 7 years imprisonment.

== See also ==
- AD-1211
- βk-Ephenidine
- Diphenidine
- Fluorolintane
- Lanicemine
- Methoxphenidine (MXP)
- MT-45
- NPDPA
- Propylphenidine
- Remacemide
- SePP
- UWA-001
