= Lanicemine =

Chemical compound

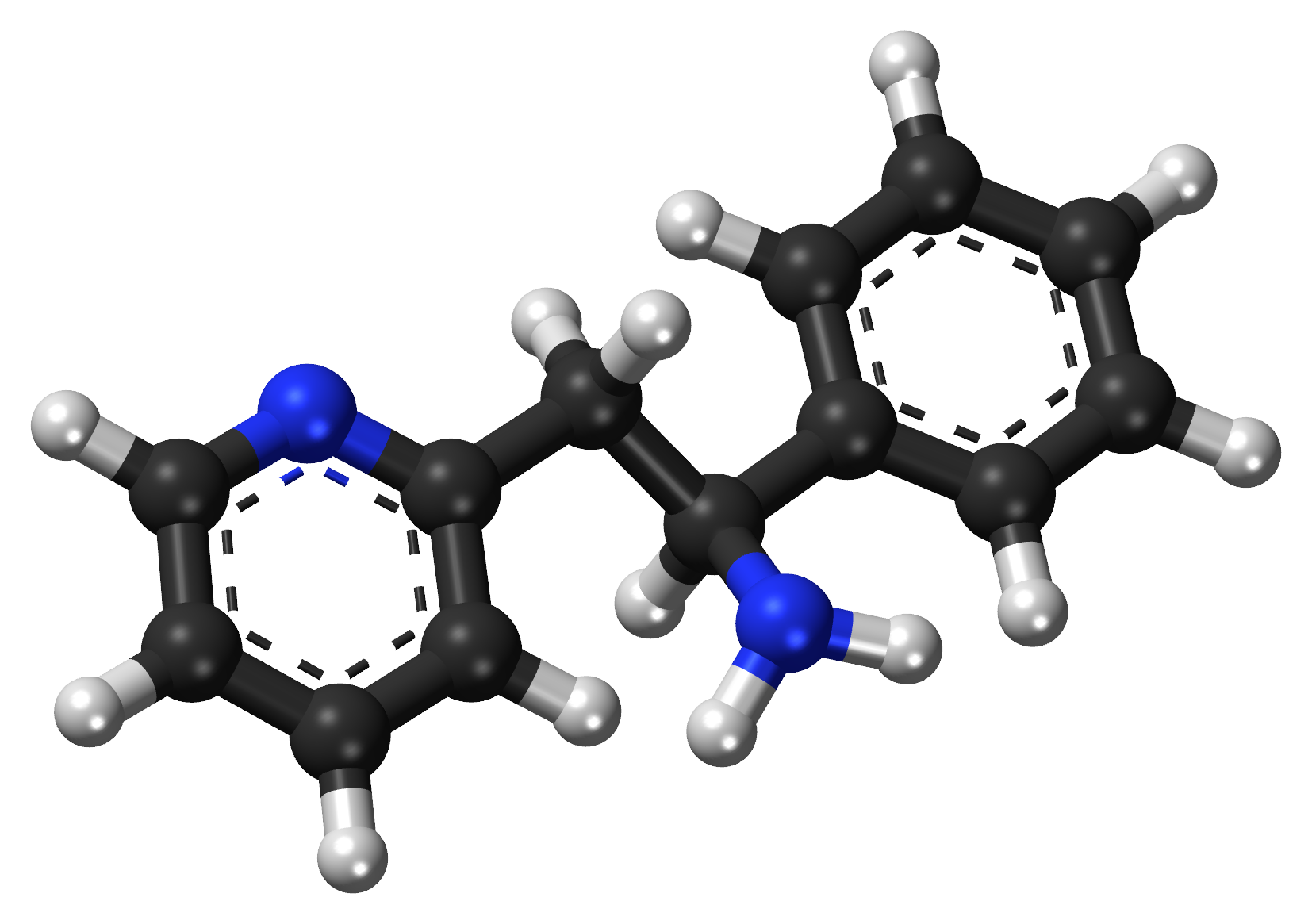

Clinical data
- ATC code: none

Legal status
- Legal status: Development terminated

Identifiers
- IUPAC name: (1S)-1-Phenyl-2-pyridin-2-ylethanamine
- CAS Number: 153322-05-5
- PubChem CID: 9794203
- IUPHAR/BPS: 7681
- ChemSpider: 7969970
- UNII: 9TMU325RK3
- CompTox Dashboard (EPA): DTXSID30870011

Chemical and physical data
- Formula: C_{13}H_{14}N_{2}
- Molar mass: 198.269 g·mol^{−1}
- 3D model (JSmol): Interactive image
- SMILES: N[C@H](C1=CC=CC=C1)CC2=NC=CC=C2
- InChI: InChI=1S/C13H14N2/c14-13(11-6-2-1-3-7-11)10-12-8-4-5-9-15-12/h1-9,13H,10,14H2/t13-/m0/s1; Key:FWUQWDCOOWEXRY-ZDUSSCGKSA-N

Lanicemine (AZD6765) is a low-trapping NMDA receptor antagonist that was under development by AstraZeneca for the management of severe and treatment-resistant depression. Lanicemine differs from ketamine in that it is a low-trapping NMDA receptor antagonist, showing similar rapid-acting antidepressant effects to ketamine in clinical trials but with little or no psychotomimetic side effects. However, lanicemine did not meet study endpoints, and its development was terminated by AstraZeneca in 2013.

== See also ==
- 4-Chlorokynurenine
- AD-1211
- Apimostinel
- CERC-301
- Diphenidine
- Ephenidine
- Esketamine
- Lefetamine
- Memantine
- Methoxphenidine
- MT-45
- Rapastinel
