= Diphenidine =

Dissociative anesthetic designer drug

Legal status
- Legal status: AU: S9 (Prohibited substance); BR: Class F2 (Prohibited psychotropics); CA: Schedule I; DE: Anlage II (Authorized trade only, not prescriptible); UK: Under Psychoactive Substances Act; UN: Psychotropic Schedule II

Identifiers
- IUPAC name: (±)-1-(1,2-Diphenylethyl)piperidine
- CAS Number: 36794-52-2
- PubChem CID: 206666
- ChemSpider: 179031
- UNII: H8Q4VPL82Y
- KEGG: C22733
- ChEBI: CHEBI:104234
- ChEMBL: ChEMBL4303426
- CompTox Dashboard (EPA): DTXSID50724547

Chemical and physical data
- Formula: C_{19}H_{23}N
- Molar mass: 265.400 g·mol^{−1}
- 3D model (JSmol): Interactive image
- Melting point: 210 °C (410 °F)
- SMILES: c1ccc(cc1)CC(c2ccccc2)N3CCCCC3
- InChI: InChI=1S/C19H23N/c1-4-10-17(11-5-1)16-19(18-12-6-2-7-13-18)20-14-8-3-9-15-20/h1-2,4-7,10-13,19H,3,8-9,14-16H2; Key:JQWJJJYHVHNXJH-UHFFFAOYSA-N

Diphenidine (1,2-DEP, DPD, DND) is a dissociative anesthetic that has been sold as a designer drug. Diphenidine was first synthesized in 1924 using a Bruylants reaction similar to the one later employed in the discovery of phencyclidine in 1956. Following the 2013 UK ban on arylcyclohexylamines, diphenidine and the related compound methoxphenidine emerged on the grey market. Anecdotal reports indicate that high doses of diphenidine can produce "bizarre somatosensory phenomena and transient anterograde amnesia."

== Pharmacology ==
Electrophysiological studies show that diphenidine reduces the amplitude of NMDA-mediated fEPSPs to a similar extent as ketamine, although its antagonistic effect has a slower onset. The drug's two enantiomers exhibit markedly different NMDA receptor affinities, with the (S)-enantiomer being approximately 40 times more potent than the (R)-enantiomer. Since diphenidine's emergence in 2013, vendors have claimed it acts on the dopamine transporter, but supporting data only became available in 2016. While diphenidine shows the highest affinity for the NMDA receptor, it also binds with submicromolar affinity to the σ_{1} receptor, σ_{2} receptor, and dopamine transporter.

== Research ==
Diphenidine and other diarylethylamines have been studied in vitro for their potential in treating neurotoxic injury. These compounds act as antagonists at the NMDA receptor. In dogs, diphenidine demonstrates greater antitussive potency than codeine phosphate.

== Illicit use ==
Since 2014, diphenidine has been detected in combination with other research chemicals, particularly synthetic cannabinoids and stimulants, in Japanese herbal incense blends. The first reported seizure involved a Japanese product labeled as "fragrance powder," which contained both diphenidine and benzylpiperazine A herbal incense product called "Aladdin Spacial [sic] Edition," sold in Shizuoka Prefecture, was found to contain 289 mg/g of diphenidine and 55.5 mg/g of 5F-AB-PINACA. Another product, Herbal Incense. The Super Lemon, containing AB-CHMINACA, 5F-AMB, and diphenidine, was linked to a fatal poisoning. More recently, diphenidine was implicated in a fatal case involving the simultaneous use of three substituted cathinones, three benzodiazepines, and alcohol, consumed through "bath salt" and "liquid aroma" products in Japan.

In Canada, MT-45 and its analogues—including DPD—were added to Schedule I controlled substances in 2016. Possession without proper authorization may result in a maximum penalty of seven years' imprisonment. That same year, Health Canada amended the Food and Drug Regulations to explicitly classify DPD as a restricted drug. Possession is limited to law enforcement agencies, individuals with exemption permits, or institutions with ministerial authorization.

== See also ==
- AD-1211
- Ephenidine
- NPDPA
- Fluorolintane
- Lanicemine
- Lefetamine
- Methoxphenidine (MXP)
- MT-45
- Remacemide
