= Methoxphenidine =

Chemical compound

Clinical data
- Routes of administration: Oral, Rectal

Legal status
- Legal status: AU: S9 (Prohibited substance); BR: Class F2 (Prohibited psychotropics); CA: Schedule I; DE: NpSG (Industrial and scientific use only); UK: Under Psychoactive Substances Act; Illegal in China and Sweden

Identifiers
- IUPAC name: (±)-1-[1-(2-methoxyphenyl)-2-phenylethyl]piperidine
- CAS Number: 127529-46-8
- PubChem CID: 67833251
- ChemSpider: 52085156
- UNII: H2W7A6GZGX
- CompTox Dashboard (EPA): DTXSID601045730

Chemical and physical data
- Formula: C_{20}H_{25}NO
- Molar mass: 295.426 g·mol^{−1}
- 3D model (JSmol): Interactive image
- SMILES: COC1=C(C=CC=C1)C(CC2=CC=CC=C2)N3CCCCC3
- InChI: InChI=1S/C20H25NO/c1-22-20-13-7-6-12-18(20)19(21-14-8-3-9-15-21)16-17-10-4-2-5-11-17/h2,4-7,10-13,19H,3,8-9,14-16H2,1H3; Key:QXXCUXIRBHSITD-UHFFFAOYSA-N

Methoxphenidine (methoxydiphenidine, 2-MeO-Diphenidine, MXP) is a dissociative of the diarylethylamine class that has been sold online as a designer drug. Methoxphenidine was first reported in a 1989 patent where it was tested as a treatment for neurotoxic injury. Shortly after the 2013 UK ban on arylcyclohexylamines methoxphenidine and the related compound diphenidine became available on the gray market, where it has been encountered as a powder and in tablet form. Though diphenidine possesses higher affinity for the NMDA receptor, anecdotal reports suggest methoxphenidine has greater oral potency. Of the three isomeric anisyl-substituents methoxphenidine has affinity for the NMDA receptor that is higher than 4-MeO-diphenidine but lower than 3-MeO-diphenidine, a structure–activity relationship shared by the arylcyclohexylamines.

== Side effects ==
Acute methoxphenidine intoxication has been reported to produce confusion, hypertension, and tachycardia that was responsive to treatment with intravenous lorazepam, methoxphenidine has also been associated with three published fatalities and one case of impaired driving.

Psychotic episodes have also been reported, including a murder in June 2014. In 2016 a man under the influence of methoxphenidine and other various NMDAR antagonists was presented to the emergency room by police after kidnapping a priest and requesting to speak to the Pope, because God prompted him to take the vows.

== Legal status ==
As of October 2015 MXP is a controlled substance in China.

MXP is also banned in Sweden.

In Canada, MT-45 and its analogues were made Schedule I controlled substances, which includes DPD in its structural group. Possession without legal authority can result in maximum seven years imprisonment. Further, Health Canada amended the Food and Drug Regulations in May, 2016 to classify explicitly DPD as a restricted drug. Only those with a law enforcement agency, person with an exemption permit or institutions with Minister's authorization may possess the drug.

In Australia, the Therapeutic Goods Administration decided to include methoxphenidine as a Prohibited substance (Schedule 9) within the Standard for the Uniform Scheduling of Medicines and Poisons alongside four other phenidine analogs on 1 October 2024.

== See also ==
- AD-1211
- Diphenidine
- Ephenidine
- Fluorolintane
- Lanicemine
- Lefetamine
- NMDA receptor antagonist
- Phencyclidine
