= Pre-workout =

Class of bodybuilding supplement

Pre-workout is a generic term for a range of bodybuilding supplement products used by athletes and weightlifters to enhance athletic performance. Supplements are taken to increase endurance, energy, and focus during a workout. Pre-workout supplements contain a variety of ingredients such as caffeine and creatine, differing by capsule or powder products. The first pre-workout product entered the market in 1982, and since then the category has grown in use. Some pre-workout products contain ingredients linked to adverse effects. Although these products are not regulated, the Food and Drug Administration (FDA) warns consumers to be cautious when consuming them.

== History ==
In 1982, Dan Duchaine formulated the first pre-workout, called Ultimate Orange, in Venice, California. Ultimate Orange was commonly used among bodybuilders.

Between the late 1990s and early 2000s, consumers alleged that an active ingredient in Ultimate Orange, called Ephedra, caused high blood pressure, strokes, seizures, cardiac arrhythmia, and heart attacks.

The risk of using Ephedra gave rise to creatine. Creatine is a supplement that was used by a lot of athletes in the 1992 Olympics where it gained most of its popularity from.

Creatine was considered a form of pre-workout in the late 1990s until the early 2000s where it was then later used with a mixture of other supplements. Creatine was negatively received when it was first introduced to the public until the last decade where it is now one of the most used supplements.

In the early 2000s, supplement companies created more potent forms of pre-workout that caused the blood flow in muscles to increase temporarily, giving lifters a better "pump." These more potent supplements are called Arginine AKG, Arginine Malate, and Citrulline.

In 2005, chemist Patrick Arnold formulated a pre-workout which contained a new ingredient called DMAA (dimethylamylamine). The product Jack3d gained notoriety for its potency, but its high concentrations of DMAA were suspected of causing shortness of breath, chest pain, and an elevated risk of heart attacks. Jack3d was banned in 2012 by the FDA.

== Ingredients ==
Pre-workout supplements are available in different forms, including tablets, capsules, liquids, powders, and bars. A number of common ingredients are used. There is considerable overlap between the ingredients used in pre-workout blends and other supplements intended for weight loss, improving mood, life extension, or as purported nootropics or aphrodisiacs, although certain ingredients tend to be found only in products intended to assist in bodybuilding or athletic training. Some ingredients such as caffeine, creatine and β-alanine are found in nearly all pre-workout blends, but each branded product is a "proprietary blend" with an average of 18 different ingredients, the exact composition and proportions of which can vary widely between different products.

- Ephedrine (usually as Ephedra extract) was a common ingredient in many pre-workout supplements in the 1990s and early 2000s, sometimes in combination with caffeine and aspirin (the so-called ECA stack), however, following many reports of serious side effects and some deaths, it was banned for use in supplements by the FDA in 2004 throughout the USA, and many other countries have enacted similar bans.
- Caffeine is now one of the most common ingredients, found in one study to be in 86% of the bestselling pre-workout supplements. Caffeine works with the central nervous system to increase the blood flow. Caffeine is a popular ingredient in pre-workout because it increases alertness, mental concentration, and energy. Related compounds such as theophylline or theobromine (sometimes as "cocoa extract") may also be used.
- Methylhexanamine, also known as DMAA, is another stimulant which was widely used for some time as an alternative or supplement to caffeine. DMAA can increase alertness in the body and help burn body fat. The FDA has warned that DMAA "is known to narrow the blood vessels and arteries, which can elevate blood pressure and may lead to cardiovascular events ranging from shortness of breath and tightening in the chest to heart attack". DMAA is also considered a prohibited stimulant by the United States Anti-Doping Agency. Following the widespread banning of DMAA, it has in some cases been replaced by similar compounds such as DMBA, octodrine, tuaminoheptane or DEPEA, which are associated with similar side effects.
- Carbohydrates are usually present, often in a mix of simple sugars like glucose and more complex oligosaccharides such as maltodextrin which are supposed to provide more sustained energy. Carbohydrates cause an increase in serotonin levels. These are used both to provide a sweet taste and fuel for exercise, though evidence for whether they actually enhance exercise performance is mixed.
- Protein supplements, usually in a palatable powdered form such as whey protein or rice protein, are also commonly used both for flavour and as a fuel for muscle growth and recovery.
- Electrolytes providing sodium, potassium and magnesium (and often others such as zinc, calcium, iron etc in smaller amounts) are often included to replace those lost due to sweating during heavy exercise, generally as a mixture of different salts, sometimes including exotic forms such as zinc monomethionine aspartate or calcium fructoborate which are supposed to be better absorbed or have other special properties. Electrolytes help the body perform homeostasis and prevent dehydration.
- Nitrate salts are commonly included (often as "beetroot extract") for their supposed benefits for endurance exercise. Sometimes this is achieved by using nitrate salts of other ingredients (e.g. arginine nitrate, creatine nitrate).
- Creatine, a natural chemical created in the kidneys and liver, is used supposedly to improve physical performance. It also promotes an increase in muscle growth.
- β-Alanine is a common ingredient found in 87% of leading pre-workout formulas. Beta-alanine decreases fatigue during high-intensity exercise by increasing the muscle carnosine concentration.
- Branched-chain amino acids, leucine, isoleucine and valine are commonly used for their muscle fueling properties and relief of post-workout soreness, often alongside other amino acids such as glutamine which are thought to have synergistic effects. Results from research have been mixed, and the dose contained in commercial pre-workout products is often less than an optimum effective dose.
- β-Hydroxy-β-methylbutyrate may sometimes be used as an ingredient in some products, though is prohibitively expensive for most commercial pre-workout blends.
- Arginine (sometimes as complexes like arginine alpha-ketoglutarate), is also commonly used as a nitric oxide precursor and supposed booster of growth hormone and IGF-1 release, though studies have shown limited benefits, and generally at higher doses than are present in typical pre-workout products.
- Ornithine or L-ornithine L-aspartate are sometimes used as an alternative or in addition to arginine, and have generally similar properties.
- Citrulline (sometimes as "watermelon extract") is used as an alternative or supplement to arginine, and is claimed to reduce post-exercise soreness.
- Agmatine is also often used as an alternative or supplement to arginine.
- Taurine is also a common ingredient in pre-workout, and can be used as a supplement taken alone. It is similar to creatine purportedly to aid muscle hypertrophy that increases strength, endurance, reduced muscle damage, and helps with a faster recovery.
- Tyrosine or its precursor N-acetyl-L-tyrosine are commonly used to purportedly boost levels of dopamine and noradrenaline. Some brands may contain L-dopa (generally as Mucuna pruriens extract), but this is classified as a prescription medicine in many countries.
- Theanine is often used as an ingredient (sometimes as "green tea extract", though this may alternatively be used to refer to EGCG, which may also be present), to supposedly improve mental and physical performance, and reduce anxiety.
- Piperine (often as "black pepper extract") is often included possibly to improve absorption of other ingredients, and for its supposed ability to improve muscle recovery.
- B vitamins are another common ingredient, most commonly vitamin B_{3} and vitamin B_{12} in various forms, but also often thiamine (sometimes as sulbutiamine), pantothenic acid (vitamin B_{5}) and folic acid.
- Carnitine or its precursor acetylcarnitine are sometimes added to the mix for their supposed ability to enhance exercise performance and aid recovery, though evidence for these benefits is weak.
- Betaine (trimethylglycine) is often used as an ingredient, despite limited evidence for effectiveness in increasing athletic performance.
- Phenethylamines such as β-phenethylamine, β-methylphenethylamine, deterenol, halostachine, N-methyltyramine, hordenine, or synephrine (sometimes as "bitter orange extract") may be included as thermogenics to aid in weight loss.
- Higenamine (norcoclaurine) is also often added for its supposed weight loss and mild stimulant properties.
- Resveratrol and related polyphenols (usually as "grape seed extract") are often included.
- Yohimbine has also been used as an ingredient (often as Pausinystalia johimbe extract), as a supposed testosterone booster and fat-loss agent, but it has been associated with dangerous side effects, and is also a prescription medicine in many countries.
- Phenylpiracetam is also sometimes used as an ingredient for its nootropic and stimulant effects.
- Capsaicin is sometimes used as an ingredient in gelcap pre-workout formulations, both as a supoosed weight loss aid and for improvement of endurance.
- Plant extracts, such as Ginkgo biloba, Panax ginseng, Rhodiola rosea and Huperzine A (from Huperzia serrata), are sometimes included for their supposed ability to improve endurance and mental clarity, despite limited evidence for efficacy.
- Ecdysteroids, such as ecdysterone and turkesterone, and other plant derived steroid like compounds such as 5α-Hydroxylaxogenin are sometimes used as ingredients, despite inconclusive results as to their supposed anabolic effects.
- Prohormones such as DHEA, CDMA, 1-androstenediol and 7α-methyl-19-norandrostenedione were widely used in pre-workout formulations prior to 2014 when they were formally banned. These compounds are not anabolic agents in their own right, but are metabolised into anabolic steroids of a type which at the time were not restricted. Despite most known prohormones having now been banned, novel compounds of this type or older compounds which are simply not listed as ingredients, are still sometimes found in over-the-counter pre-workout products, and are a frequent cause of inadvertent drug testing failures by athletes in competition.
- Selective androgen receptor modulators (SARMs) such as enobosarm and ligandrol are also sometimes found as ingredients in pre-workout supplement blends, and again when present are often not accurately declared on the ingredients listing.

== Retail supplements ==
Pre-workout supplements are sold in a variety of retailers. The top-selling brands of pre-workout supplements in 2019 included Pre JYM Pre Workout by JYM Supplemental Science, ENGN Shred Pre Workout by EVLUTION Nutrition, and C4 Original Pre Workout by Cellucor. These brands were the top three in the overall bestseller category on leading bodybuilding informational website bodybuilding.com and Sports Illustrated. Some variations on common pre-workout products include sugar-free, creatine-free and stimulant-free options. The market size for pre-workout products was a $2.7 billion industry in 2008. In 2022 the market size for pre-workout had grown to $14.2 billion.

Lack of regulation can mean that the ingredients used to prepare the product may not be of high quality and purity. This can mean the dose stated on the ingredients does not match the actual composition of the blend. Plant extracts in particular are often adulterated or of varying quality, but may be assumed by manufacturers to be pure and consistent. Also, protein powders used to prepare the blend may sometimes be contaminated with melamine, a plastic precursor which is sometimes added to produce false positive results for nitrogen content. Up to 50% of pre-workout blends analysed in one study were found to be contaminated with melamine.

== Purported benefits ==
=== Impact on muscles ===
An increase in muscle endurance is primarily attributed to the large amounts of caffeine in pre-workout supplements. The ingested caffeine acts as an adenosine receptor antagonist, which serves to reduce overall pain experienced by the consumer and allowing them to work for longer periods of time. Pre-workout also increases the amount of carbohydrates in the body which are used to increase energy in the body.

Pre-workout has shown to decrease the time it takes for muscles to recover from intense exercise, allowing athletes to reduce time between training sessions. The improvement in muscle recovery is associated with the branched chain amino acids (BCAAs) found in pre-workout, particularly, glutamine.

=== Other benefits ===
Pre-workout has shown to make athletes feel more energetic during exercise, but the higher energy levels are based on subjective judgement and there is little quantitative proof of an increase in energy. Caffeine's role in enhancing the improvement in perceived energy is observed through the large amounts of caffeine typically found in pre-workout supplements. Caffeine also increases calcium release which allows for stronger muscle contractions during high intensity workouts.

Studies also show that the caffeine in pre-workout improves focus and alertness in athletes as observed through a decrease in reaction-time in different settings.

== Adverse effects ==
Various adverse effects may occur according to the pre-workout product and dose of supplement consumed. Some potential side effects of taking pre-workout could include nausea and skin irritation. One ingredient that causes this to happen is beta-alanine. Beta-alanine is commonly included in pre-workouts. It is known to temporarily create an itching sensation on skin. This sensation is harmless. It typically occurs shortly after consumption and is dose dependent. Other adverse effects have been shown to arise when the product contains ingredients such as synephrine and caffeine. Synephrine is often used as a weight loss supplement and commonly found in pre-workout. Synephrine has been found to cause heart problems and other cardiovascular issues. Caffeine is also a common ingredient found in pre-workout which may cause an increase in blood pressure. Another issue that may arise is a higher risk in cardiac and liver related diseases due to the high concentration of caffeine in these types of products.

== Food and Drug Administration ==
The FDA has minimal control when regulating dietary supplements like pre-workout. Product manufacturers are responsible to verify that dietary supplements are safe for consumption. Financial limitations prevent the FDA from testing dietary supplements before they enter the marketplace. Once a supplement is available for sale, the FDA is responsible to document and monitor manufacturer reports of adverse effects. Manufacturers are obligated to report documented adverse effects to the FDA.

The FDA recommends speaking with a healthcare professional before using dietary supplements. Ingredients in pre-workout can have negative side effects or contraindications with other medications. Taking dietary supplements may have life-threatening consequences if taken with pre-existing health conditions. Federal laws state that a supplement does not have to be declared safe by FDA standards when labeled. Most supplement businesses hire third-party companies to identify the contents of their supplement to ensure it enhances athletic performance. This also aids in assuring that a product's labeled ingredients are free from illegal substances.

== See also ==
- Doping in sport
- Patent medicine
