= C14H17NO3 =

The molecular formula C_{14}H_{17}NO_{3} (molar mass : 247.28 g/mol) may refer to:

- CX-546
- N-Ethoxycarbonyl-2-ethoxy-1,2-dihydroquinoline
- Fagaramide
- 3',4'-Methylenedioxy-α-pyrrolidinopropiophenone
