= Methylhexanamine =

Chemical compound

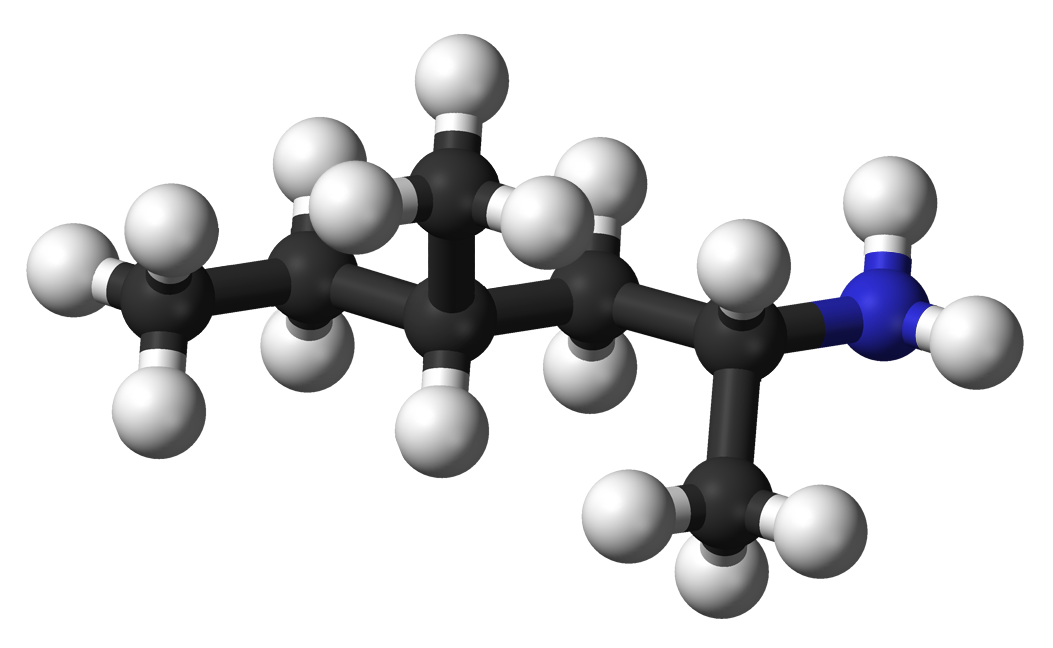

Clinical data
- Other names: Methylhexaneamine, methylhexamine, geranamine, geranium extract, geranium oil, 2-amino-4-methylhexane, dimethylamylamine, DMAA, 1,3-dimethylamylamine, 1,3-DMAA, 1,3-dimethylpentylamine, 4-methyl-2-hexanamine, 4-methyl-2-hexylamine
- Routes of administration: Nasal spray, oral
- ATC code: None

Legal status
- Legal status: AU: S10 (Dangerous substance); BR: Class F2 (Prohibited psychotropics); US: Unapproved drug; use in dietary supplements, food, or medicine is unlawful. (Note: The N.D.A (New Drug Application) for methylhexanamine was withdrawn in 1983. Consequently, any product containing methylhexanamine cannot be marketed in the United States until a new application is approved.)

Pharmacokinetic data
- Elimination half-life: ~8.5 hours

Identifiers
- IUPAC name: 4-Methylhexan-2-amine
- CAS Number: 105-41-9
- PubChem CID: 7753
- ChemSpider: 7467
- UNII: X49C572YQO
- CompTox Dashboard (EPA): DTXSID60861715
- ECHA InfoCard: 100.002.997

Chemical and physical data
- Formula: C_{7}H_{17}N
- Molar mass: 115.220 g·mol^{−1}
- 3D model (JSmol): Interactive image
- SMILES: CCC(C)CC(C)N
- InChI: InChI=1S/C7H17N/c1-4-6(2)5-7(3)8/h6-7H,4-5,8H2,1-3H3; Key:YAHRDLICUYEDAU-UHFFFAOYSA-N

Methylhexanamine (also known as methylhexamine, 1,3-dimethylamylamine, 1,3-DMAA, dimethylamylamine, and DMAA; trade names Forthane and Geranamine) is an indirect sympathomimetic drug invented and developed by Eli Lilly and Company and marketed as an inhaled nasal decongestant from 1948 until it was voluntarily withdrawn from the market in the 1980s.

Since 2006 methylhexanamine has been sold extensively under many names as a stimulant or energy-boosting dietary supplement under the claim that it is similar to certain compounds found in geraniums, but its safety has been questioned as a number of adverse events and at least five deaths have been associated with methylhexanamine-containing supplements. It is banned by many sports authorities and governmental agencies. Although dietary supplements containing DMAA are currently banned by the FDA, the stimulant may still be found as an undeclared ingredient in sports and weight loss supplements in the US.

== History ==
In April 1944, Eli Lilly and Company introduced methylhexanamine under the brand name Forthane as an inhaled nasal decongestant; Lilly voluntarily withdrew methylhexanamine from the market in 1983. The compound is an aliphatic amine; the pharmaceutical industry had a strong interest in compounds in this class as nasal decongestants in the early 20th century, which led to methylhexanamine and four other similar compounds being brought to market for that use: tuaminoheptane, octin (isometheptene), oenethyl (2-methylaminoheptane), and propylhexedrine; octin and oenethyl were eventually approved for use in keeping blood pressure sufficiently high for patients under anesthesia.

== Marketing as dietary supplement ==
Patrick Arnold reintroduced methylhexanamine in 2006 as a dietary supplement, after the final ban of ephedrine in the United States in 2005. Arnold introduced it under the trademarked name Geranamine, a name held by his company, Proviant Technologies. A large number of supplements focusing on fat loss and workout energy (thermogenic or general-purpose stimulants) used the ingredient in concert with other substances such as caffeine, a combination similar to the combination of ephedrine and caffeine.

Methylhexanamine-containing supplements sometimes list "geranium oil" or "geranium extract" as a source of methylhexanamine. However, geranium oils do not contain methylhexanamine, and the methylhexanamine in these supplements is added in the form of synthetic material. A variety of studies have explored the possibility that DMAA is found in some types of geraniums, but at present, high quality evidence of DMAA's presence in plants is lacking.

Methylhexanamine is synthesized by reacting 4-methylhexan-2-one with hydroxylamine, which converts the 4-methylhexan-2-one to 4-methylhexan-2-one oxime, which is reduced via catalytic hydrogenation; the resulting methylhexanamine can be purified by distillation.

== Pharmacology ==
Methylhexanamine is an indirect sympathomimetic drug that constricts blood vessels and thus has effects on the heart, lungs, and reproductive organs. It also causes bronchodilation, inhibits peristalsis in the intestines, and has diuretic effects.

Most studies have been done on pharmacological effects when the drug is inhaled; the understanding of what methylhexanamine does when taken orally are mostly based on extrapolating from the activities of similar compounds. A 2013 review concluded that: "Pharmacological effects after oral intake can be expected on the lungs (bronchodilation) and the nasal mucosa following a single oral dose of about 4–15 mg. Pharmacological effects on the heart can be expected following a single oral dose of about 50–75 mg. Pharmacological effects on the blood pressure can be expected after a single oral dose of about 100 mg. Because of the long half-life, there is a risk that repeated doses within 24–36 hours could lead to steadily stronger pharmacological effects (build-up)."

In 2019 and 2023, methylhexanamine was found to show activity consistent with being a norepinephrine and dopamine releasing agent (NDRA).

=== Detection in body fluids ===
Methylhexanamine may be quantified in blood, plasma, or urine by gas or liquid chromatography-mass spectrometry to confirm a diagnosis of poisoning in hospitalized patients or to provide evidence in a medicolegal death investigation. Blood or plasma methylhexanamine concentrations are expected to be in a range of 10–100 μg/L in persons using the drug recreationally, >100 μg/L in intoxicated patients, and >300 μg/L in victims of acute overdosage.

== Safety ==
The LD_{50} for methylhexanamine is 39 mg/kg in mice and 72.5 mg/kg in rats, when administered intravenously.

The FDA has stated that methylhexanamine "is known to narrow the blood vessels and arteries, which can elevate blood pressure and may lead to cardiovascular events ranging from shortness of breath and tightening in the chest to heart attack". Numerous adverse events and at least five deaths have been reported in association with methylhexanamine-containing dietary supplements. There have also been reports of secondary open-angle glaucoma related to methylhexanamine supplementation.

A 2012 review by a panel convened by the U.S. Department of Defense to study whether the military should ban methylhexanamine supplements from stores on its bases concluded that: "The existing evidence does not conclusively establish that DMAA-containing substances are causally-associated with adverse medical events. However, a consistent theme among the studies is that DMAA use potentially affects cardiovascular function, just as other sympathomimetic stimulants. Without further rigorous study designs developed to evaluate the safety of DMAA, especially in patients with concomitant use of other substances, co-morbid conditions and high frequency use, the magnitude of the association of DMAA with adverse medical events is uncertain. Widespread use of DMAA-containing products by tens of thousands of Service members – often in combination with other substances – increases the likelihood of observing serious adverse events, even if the overall risk of a DMAA-related event is low, resulting in consequential impact to some Service members and other beneficiaries. DMAA should be further studied to evaluate its safety. Data from the case control study suggest that the frequency and amount of DMAA use and risk of specific [acquired medical events], particularly heat injuries and rhabdomyolysis, need to be examined in greater detail. ... The Safety Review Panel recommended ... to continue the prohibition of sales of DMAA-containing products in Exchanges and concessions. The Panel judged that the evidence supports sufficient risk, even if very low, of another death or catastrophic illness of a Service member who has used DMAA-containing products, without any offsetting benefit of these products."

=== Deaths and injuries ===
In 2010, a 21-year-old man in New Zealand presented with a cerebral hemorrhage after ingesting 556 mg of methylhexanamine, caffeine, and alcohol. Health authorities in Hawaii linked cases of liver failure and one death to OxyElite Pro, a weight loss and bodybuilding dietary supplement.

The death of Claire Squires, a runner who collapsed near the finish-line of the April 2012 London Marathon, has been linked to methylhexanamine. The coroner stated that methylhexanamine was "probably an important factor" during the inquest. Despite, according to a friend, having been diagnosed with an irregular heartbeat and advised not to consume methylhexanamine, it is believed that she consumed the substance through drinking an energy drink, which was subsequently reformulated to exclude methylhexanamine.

== Chemistry ==
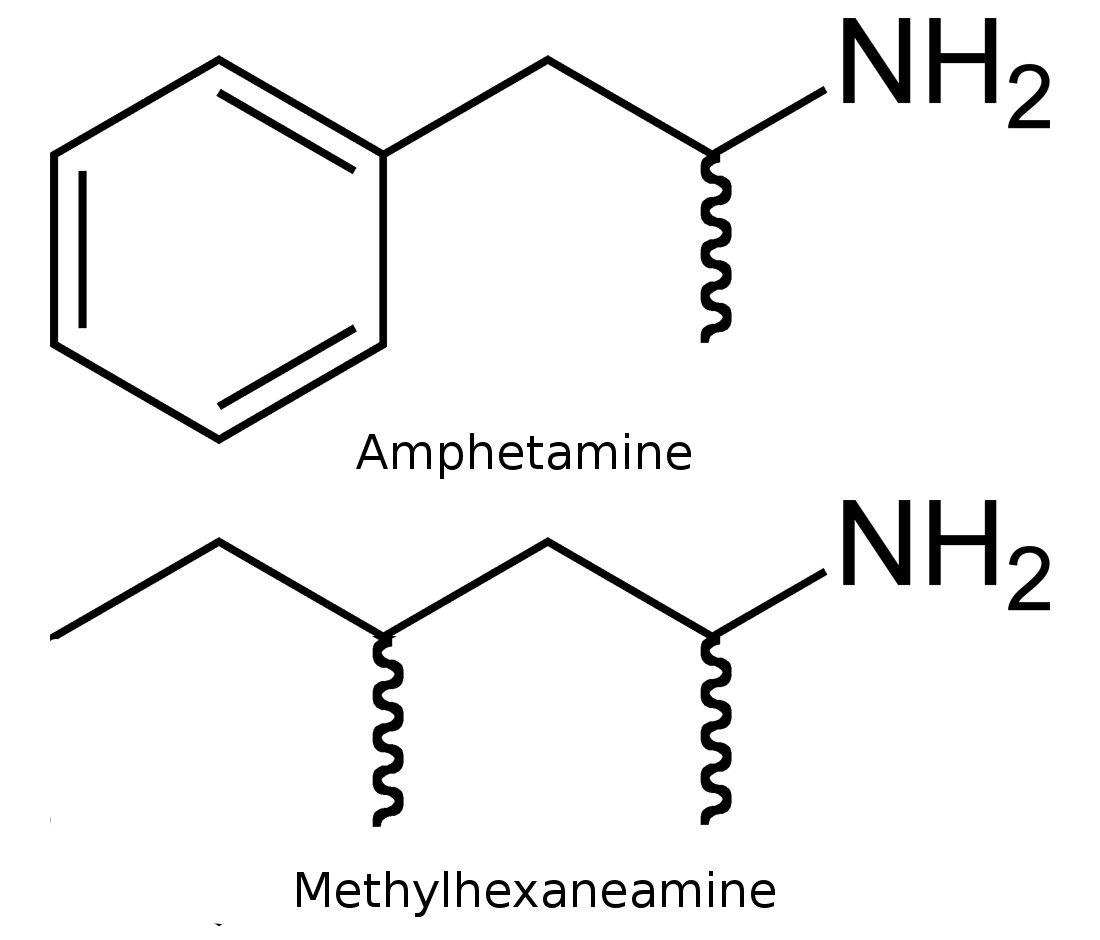
Chemical structures of amphetamine and methylhexanamine compared

Methylhexanamine, also known as 1,3-dimethylamylamine (1,3-DMAA), is an alkylamine.

It is closely structurally related to other alkylamines, including 1,3-dimethylbutylamine (1,3-DMBA), 1,4-dimethylamylamine (1,4-DMAA), heptaminol (2-methyl-6-amino-2-heptanol), iproheptine (N-isopropyl-1,5-dimethylhexylamine), isometheptene (2-methyl-6-methylamino-2-heptene), octodrine (2-amino-6-methylheptane or 1,5-dimethylhexylamine), and tuaminoheptane (tuamine; 2-aminoheptane or 1-methylhexylamine).

Methylhexanamine and other related alkylamines are similar in chemical structure to phenethylamines and amphetamines, but lack a closed ring.

The predicted log P (XLogP3) of methylhexanamine is 1.9.

== Regulation ==
A number of sporting authorities and countries have banned or heavily restricted the use of methylhexanamine as a dietary supplement, due to serious concerns about its safety. These countries include Australia, Brazil, Canada, Finland, New Zealand, Sweden, Switzerland, the United Kingdom, and the United States.

=== Sports authorities ===
Many professional and amateur sports bodies, such as the World Anti Doping Agency, have banned methylhexanamine as a performance-enhancing substance and suspended athletes that have used it.

- March 2012, a minor league baseball player, Cody Stanley, was suspended 50 games for testing positive after using a dietary supplement.
- In July 2012, Welsh boxer Enzo Maccarinelli was banned for six months after testing positive for methylhexanamine.
- VFL player Matthew Clark was suspended for two years after the banned substance was detected in his system after a game in 2011.
- August 2012, then minor league baseball player Marcus Stroman was suspended 50 games for testing positive for methylhexanamine.
- On 8 August 2013, US Weightlifter Brian Wilhelm accepted a nine-month suspension after testing positive for the drug in a urine sample from December 2012 at the American Open.
- MotoGP rider Anthony West was suspended for one month by the FIM International Disciplinary Court (CDI) on 29 October 2012 after testing positive for the drug on 20 May 2012 at the French Grand Prix. This was increased retroactively to an 18-month suspension, starting from 20 May 2012, on 28 November 2013 after an appeal by the World Anti-Doping Agency (WADA).
- In December 2013, boxer Brandon Rios, after losing a unanimous decision to Manny Pacquiao, was suspended by the China Professional Boxing Association after testing positive for the drug.
- During the 2014 Winter Olympics in Sochi, three athletes tested positive for the drug: Italian bobsleigh brakeman and former decathlete William Frullani, German biathlete Evi Sachenbacher-Stehle and Latvian ice hockey forward Vitalijs Pavlovs.
- During the 2015 Asian Cup, Iraqi player Alaa Abdul-Zahra was subject to an investigation relating to illegal usage of the drug.
- In January 2016, Algerian footballer Kheiredine Merzougi was banned for two years by the Confederation of African Football after testing positive for the drug. However, in March 2016, the international body FIFA confirmed they were giving an extended four-year ban to apply worldwide through January 2020.
- In November 2016, heavyweight boxer Bermane Stiverne was fined US$75,000 after testing positive for methylhexanamine by the World Boxing Council. The WBC, however, still allowed this fight to happen.
- In 2017, the International Olympic Committee disqualified Jamaica's 2008 gold-winning 4 ×100 men's relay in Beijing due to Nesta Carter's positive testing for methylhexanamine. This cost Usain Bolt a medal.
- AMA Supercross Championship rider Broc Tickle was provisionally suspended by the FIM International Disciplinary Court (CDI) on 13 April 2018 after testing positive for the drug following a drug test after the supercross round held in San Diego on 10 February 2018.
- On May 22, 2018, Filipino basketball player Kiefer Ravena was handed 18 months suspension by FIBA to compete in international competition. He was found testing positive for methylhexanamine and 1,3-dimethlybutylamine by WADA. Urine samples were taken after the Philippines vs Japan game at Manila during the 2019 FIBA Basketball World Cup Qualification. Ravena explained that he consumes a pre-workout drink called C4, which can be bought from retailers around Metro Manila. He ran out of supplies shortly before a training camp in Australia and took Blackstone Labs DUST, a supplement which is mixed with water and is supposedly similar to C4.
- On August 26, 2019, NASCAR crew chief Matt Borland was indefinitely suspended under the sanctioning body's substance abuse policy after testing positive for DMAA. In a statement, Borland said that the positive test was most likely caused by a diet coffee he had felt comfortable drinking "after doing my due diligence." Team owner Bob Germain Jr. also said that he did not believe Borland “had reason to know that the coffee contained a banned substance. However, we also understand and respect NASCAR’s decisions to strictly uphold their policies for each and every owner, driver and crew member in the garage." The suspension was lifted on September 24 after completing NASCAR's mandatory "Road to Recovery Program".

=== Governmental agencies ===
In 2010, the US military issued a recall of all methylhexanamine-containing products from all military exchange stores worldwide.

In July 2011, Health Canada decided methylhexanamine was not a dietary substance, but was a drug requiring further approval. Consequently, Health Canada banned all sales of methylhexanamine.

In June 2012, the National Food Agency of Sweden issued a general warning regarding use of methylhexanamine products, resulting in a sales ban in parts of the country.

In July 2012, the National Health Surveillance Agency of Brazil issued a warning to the general public on the hazards of products that contain methylhexanamine. It also updated the list of prohibited substances to insert methylhexanamine, which translates into the banishment of products containing such ingredient from the Brazilian market.

In 2012, Australia banned methylhexanamine. In New South Wales, methylhexanamine was classed as a "highly dangerous substance" on the poisons list.

In August 2012, the UK Medicines and Healthcare products Regulatory Agency (MHRA) has ruled that the popular DMAA containing sports supplement Jack3D is an unlicensed medicinal product and that it and all other methylhexanamine containing products need to be removed from the UK market amid concerns of potential risks to public safety.

In 2012 the New Zealand Ministry of Health banned the sale of methylhexanamine products, due in part to its growing recreational use as party pills.

In April 2013, the US Food and Drug Administration determined that methylhexanamine was potentially dangerous and did not qualify as a legal dietary supplement; it warned supplement makers that it was illegal to market methylhexanamine and warned consumers of potentially serious health risks associated with methylhexanamine-containing products. The FDA has issued warning letters to manufacturers and distributors who continued to market products containing methylhexanamine. In 2019, the FDA won its appeal against DMAA manufacturer Hi-Tech Pharmaceuticals in the 11th Circuit, which ruled that DMAA does not meet the definition of a dietary supplement under the Dietary Supplement Health and Education Act of 1994, and may not be marketed as such.

== See also ==
- 1,3-Dimethylbutylamine
- Benzedrine
- Cyclopentamine
- Deterenol
- Heptaminol
- Iproheptine
- Isometheptene
- Isopentylamine
- Levomethamphetamine
- Octodrine
- Propylhexedrine
- Pseudoephedrine
- Tuaminoheptane
