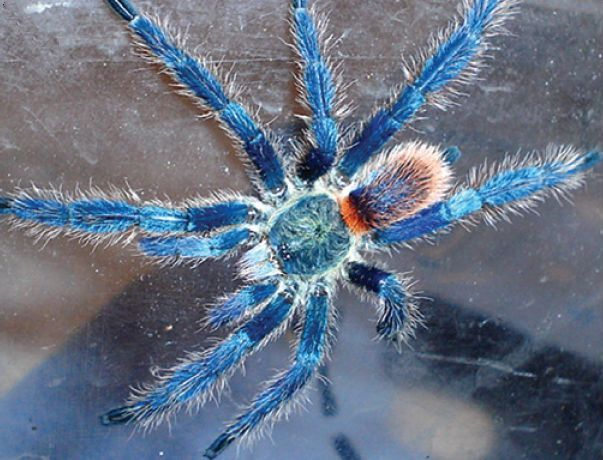
- Male
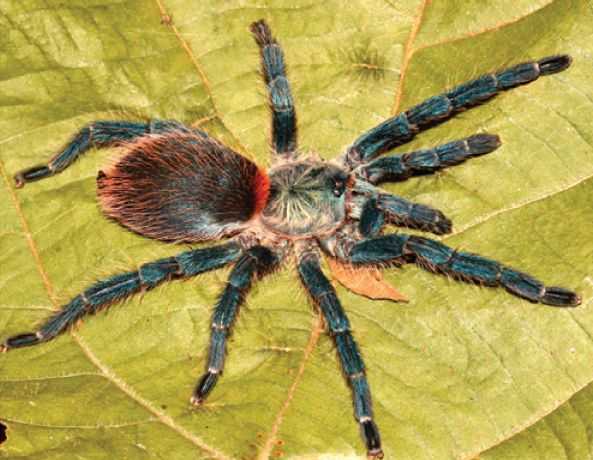
- Female

Scientific classification
- Kingdom: Animalia
- Phylum: Arthropoda
- Subphylum: Chelicerata
- Class: Arachnida
- Order: Araneae
- Infraorder: Mygalomorphae
- Family: Theraphosidae
- Genus: Dolichothele
- Species: D. diamantinensis

Binomial name
- Dolichothele diamantinensis Bertani, Santos & Righi, 2009

= Dolichothele diamantinensis =

Species of tarantula

Dolichothele diamantinensis also known as the Brazilian blue dwarf beauty tarantula, is a tarantula which was first described in 2009 by Rogério Bertani, Thiago dos Santos and Alexandre Righi. As its common name aptly states it is found in Brazil and is a terrestrial tarantula. It was first originally described as Oligoxystre diamantinensis.

== Description ==
Females live 12 to 15 years, while males only live to 3. Their carapace is a blueish-greenish color, with a blue opisthosoma with long reddish hairs. The legs are a bright blue, white hairs covering these legs. Making it look similar to Chromatopelma cyaneopubescens, otherwise known as the Greenbottle Blue Tarantula.

== Behavior ==
They are quite heavy webbers, making intricate tunnels. They are very skittish, rarely striking a threat pose, though they may do so under persistent provocation. They are great display species, as they will usually be outside their tunnels, and although a new world species, they cannot throw urticating hairs. They only live in the forest
