= Deterenol =

Chemical compound

Clinical data
- Trade names: Betafrine
- Other names: Isopropylnorsynephrine, Isopropyloctopamine

Identifiers
- IUPAC name: 4-[1-hydroxy-2-(propan-2-ylamino)ethyl]phenol
- CAS Number: 7376-66-1
- PubChem CID: 23843
- ChemSpider: 22290
- UNII: BR971OUC9M
- KEGG: D03700
- ChEMBL: ChEMBL109378
- CompTox Dashboard (EPA): DTXSID90956502

Chemical and physical data
- Formula: C_{11}H_{17}NO_{2}
- Molar mass: 195.262 g·mol^{−1}
- 3D model (JSmol): Interactive image
- SMILES: CC(C)NCC(C1=CC=C(C=C1)O)O
- InChI: InChI=1S/C11H17NO2/c1-8(2)12-7-11(14)9-3-5-10(13)6-4-9/h3-6,8,11-14H,7H2,1-2H3; Key:MPCPSVWSWKWJLO-UHFFFAOYSA-N

Deterenol (also known as Isopropylnorsynephrine and Isopropyloctopamine; trade name Betaphrine) is a stimulant drug which acts as a beta agonist. It has been found as an ingredient of dietary supplement products, but is banned in most countries due to risk of cardiac arrest.

== See also ==
- Halostachine
- Isoprenaline
- Isopropylamphetamine
- Methylhexanamine
- Octopamine
- Phenpromethamine
- Synephrine
- Pre-workout
