= 5α-Hydroxylaxogenin =

Chemical compound

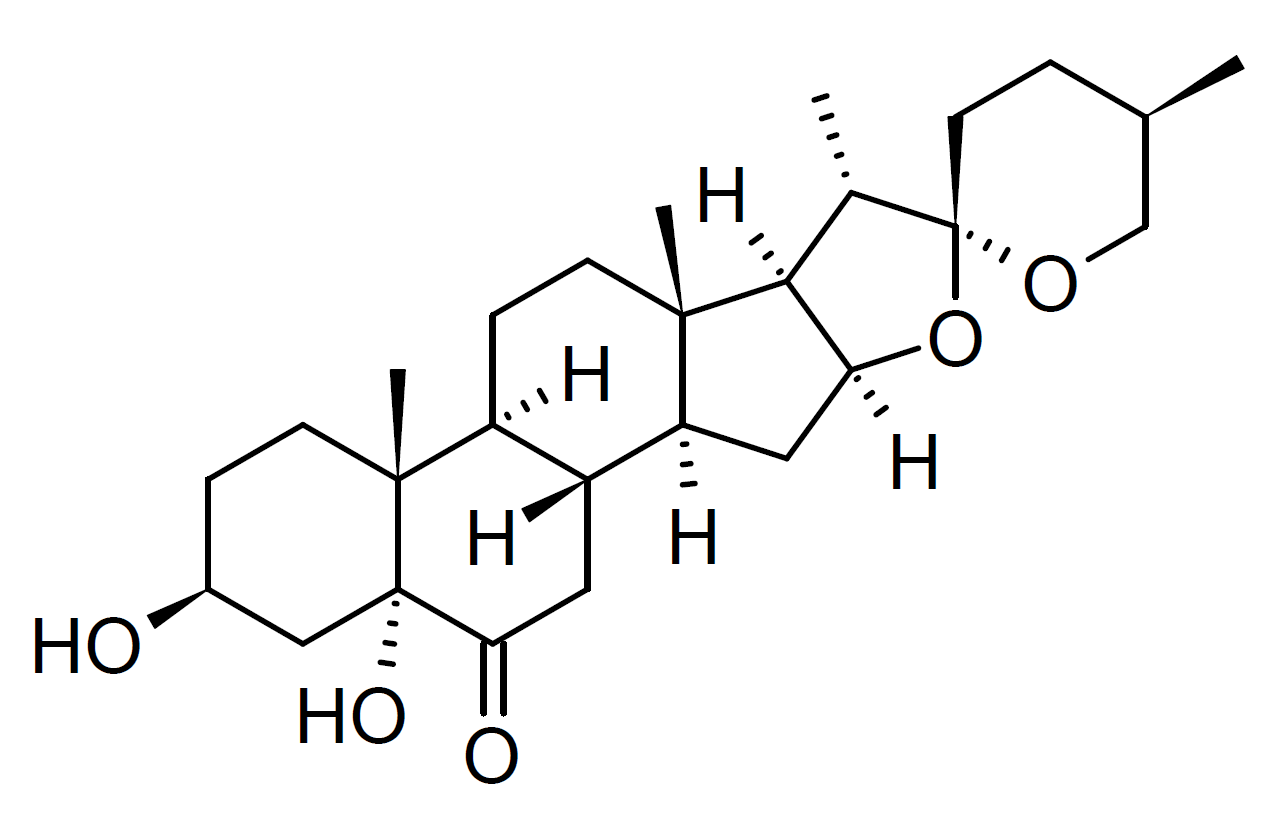

Identifiers
- IUPAC name: (1S,2S,4S,5'R,6R,7S,8R,9S,12S,13R,16S,18R)-16,18-dihydroxy-5',7,9,13-tetramethylspiro[5-oxapentacyclo[10.8.0.0^{2,9}.0^{4,8}.0^{13,18}]icosane-6,2'-oxane]-19-one
- CAS Number: 56786-63-1
- PubChem CID: 69906537
- ChemSpider: 35228242
- UNII: 844KE20WT5

Chemical and physical data
- Formula: C_{27}H_{42}O_{5}
- Molar mass: 446.628 g·mol^{−1}
- 3D model (JSmol): Interactive image
- SMILES: C[C@@H]1CC[C@@]2([C@H]([C@H]3[C@@H](O2)C[C@@H]4[C@@]3(CC[C@H]5[C@H]4CC(=O)[C@@]6([C@@]5(CC[C@@H](C6)O)C)O)C)C)OC1
- InChI: InChI=1S/C27H42O5/c1-15-5-10-27(31-14-15)16(2)23-21(32-27)12-20-18-11-22(29)26(30)13-17(28)6-9-25(26,4)19(18)7-8-24(20,23)3/h15-21,23,28,30H,5-14H2,1-4H3/t15-,16+,17+,18-,19+,20+,21+,23+,24+,25-,26+,27-/m1/s1; Key:HCRGPOQBVFMZFY-PPCFKNSFSA-N

5α-Hydroxylaxogenin is a chemical compound which is a semi-synthetic derivative of laxogenin. It is not found in the Chinese medicinal plant Smilax sieboldii, instead, identification of several synthetic impurities by Dr. Chittiboyina's group suggested that it is synthesized from diosgenin. It acts as a partial agonist at androgen receptors and has been sold as a bodybuilding supplement and pre-workout product.

== See also ==
- Ecdysterone
- Turkesterone
