= Embrik Strand =

Norwegian entomologist and arachnologist

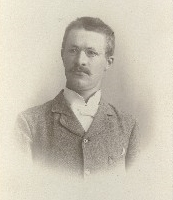
Norwegian botanist, entomologist, arachnologist, professor, conservator, and lepidopterist (1876–1947)

Embrik Strand (2 June 1876 – 3 November 1947) was an entomologist and arachnologist who classified many insect and spider species, including the greenbottle blue tarantula.

== Life and career ==
Strand was born in Ål, Norway. He studied at the University of Kristiania (now University of Oslo). Around 1900 he focused on collecting insect specimens from Norway. These are now deposited at the university's museum, where he worked as a curator from 1901 to 1903.

After studying at the University of Oslo, Strand traveled in Norway from 1898 to 1903 collecting a great number of insects. For part of this time (1901–1903) he was a conservator in the museum of zoology of the university. He then left for Germany where he continued his studies of zoology at the University of Marburg (1903). He then worked with State Museum of Natural History Stuttgart (1905) and, later, that of Tübingen and then with Senckenberg Museum in Frankfurt. From 1907, he worked with Natural History Museum, Berlin. In 1923, he accepted the post of professor of zoology at the University of Riga where he directed the institute of zoology and hydrobiology.

Strand was the author of many publications, mainly on insects and spiders and was the descriptor of several hundred new species. From 1910 to 1929, he edited the review Archiv für Naturgeschichte and was the founder, in 1928, of Folia zoologica and hydrobiologica. Pierre Bonnet indicates, in his Bibliographia araneorum (pages 150–153), that a record number of new taxa were dedicated to Strand. Strand himself was the editor of a book in three volumes listing these, to celebrate his jubilee. There are indeed several hundreds of species which bear his name in all the possible forms: strandi, atrandella, embriki, embrikiellus, embrik-strandella, etc. In the same way, Bonnet reproached Strand for renaming already described species where he considered the names incorrect: Strand draws up a list of these, in 1926, where he renames nearly 1,700 taxa of spiders.

He was a prolific author, the list of his publications which he published in 1918 (after only twenty years of activity) is 1,200 titles. Strand was a contributor to Adalbert Seitz's Macrolepidoptera of the World (Bombycidae). He died in Riga, aged 71.

Strand's collection of insects and spiders from Norway is in the Zoological Museum of the University of Oslo. His types are in the German Entomological Institute and the Museum für Naturkunde.

== See also ==
- Category:Taxa named by Embrik Strand

== Sources ==
- Natvig, L. R. (1943). [Strand, E.] Norsk ent. Tidsskr. 7(1/2) 58–61, Portr. + Schr.verz.
- Pfaff, G. & Wrede, O. H. (1934). [Strand, E.] Festschrift, 50jähriges Bestehen I.E.V. 11, Portrait.
- Bonnet, P. (1945). Bibliographia araneorum the brothers Doularoude (Toulouse): 62.
