= Isopentylamine =

Names
- IUPAC name 3-methylbutan-1-amine
- Other names: Isoamylamine; Isovaleramine; Leucamine; 3-Methylbutylamine

Identifiers
CAS Number	107-85-7
3D model (JSmol)	Interactive image
ChEBI	CHEBI:43689
ChEMBL	ChEMBL42003
ChemSpider	7606
ECHA InfoCard	100.003.206
EC Number	203-526-0
IUPHAR/BPS	5506
KEGG	C02640
PubChem CID	7894
UNII	LPO0L33SHY
CompTox Dashboard (EPA)	DTXSID7059355
- InChI: InChI=1S/C5H13N/c1-5(2)3-4-6/h5H,3-4,6H2,1-2H3 Key: BMFVGAAISNGQNM-UHFFFAOYSA-N
- SMILES: CC(C)CCN

Properties
Chemical formula	C_{5}H_{13}N
Molar mass	87.166 g·mol^{−1}
Appearance	colorless
Density	0.747-0.753 g/cm^{3}
Melting point	−60 °C (−76 °F; 213 K)
Boiling point	95–97 °C (203–207 °F; 368–370 K)
Solubility in water	soluble
Solubility	soluble in ethanol, propylene glycol, glycerin, oils
Refractive index (n_{D})	1.405-1.411

Hazards
- GHS labelling
Pictograms	(GHS02: Flammable) (GHS05: Corrosive) (GHS07: Exclamation mark)
Signal word	Danger
Hazard statements	H225, H302, H314, H315, H319, H335
Precautionary statements	P210, P233, P240, P241, P242, P243, P260, P264, P264+P265, P270, P271, P280, P301+P317, P301+P330+P331, P302+P352, P302+P361+P354, P303+P361+P353, P304+P340, P305+P351+P338, P305+P354+P338, P316, P317, P319, P321, P330, P332+P317, P337+P317, P362+P364, P363, P370+P378, P403+P233, P403+P235, P405, P501
- Except where otherwise noted, data are given for materials in their standard state (at 25 °C [77 °F], 100 kPa). Infobox references

Isopentylamine, also known as isoamylamine, isovaleramine, or leucamine, is a naturally occurring aliphatic amine and alkylamine compound. It has been reported to produce sympathomimetic effects in preclinical research similarly to other alkylamines. The compound is a substrate for and is metabolized by the enzyme monoamine oxidase (MAO) similarly to phenethylamine. It is produced by certain bacteria and plants, for instance via decarboxylation of the amino acid leucine. Isopentylamine functions as an insecticide in plants. Gut bacteria-derived isopentylamine is enriched in older mice and humans and has been found to promote age-related cognitive dysfunction via microglial cell death in mice.

== See also ==
- 1,3-Dimethylbutylamine (1,3-DMBA)
- Methylhexanamine (1,3-dimethylamylamine; 1,3-DMAA)
- Imidazole propionate
