= Matt Borland =

American NASCAR crew chief (born 1991)

Personal information
- Born: Matthew T. Borland; September 2, 1971 (age 54) Big Rapids, Michigan, U.S.
- Occupation: Crew Chief
- Years active: 2000–present

Sport
- Country: United States
- Sport: Motor racing
- League: NASCAR

Matthew T. Borland (born September 2, 1971) is an American NASCAR crew chief. He last worked at Germain Racing as the crew chief for the No. 13 Chevrolet, driven by Ty Dillon in the NASCAR Cup Series. Starting his career as a crew chief for Ryan Newman in 2000, he has worked with teams such as Team Penske, Stewart–Haas Racing, and Richard Childress Racing.

== Early life ==
Born on September 2, 1971, in Big Rapids, Michigan, Borland later attended GMI Engineering & Management Institute (now Kettering University) and graduated with a degree in mechanical engineering before pursuing a career in Motorsports.

== Career ==
During the 2000 season, after an impressive season with Ryan Newman in the ARCA Bondo/Mar-Hyde Series, Borland and Newman made their NASCAR Cup Series debuts driving for the No. 02 Penske–Kranefuss Racing Ford at Phoenix, starting in tenth and finishing 41st after having engine issues.

In 2001, Newman and Borland teamed up again for 7 races, again for the No. 02 team. In May, at Charlotte, Newman would qualify pole for the Coca-Cola 600, giving both Newman and Borland their first poles in cup competition.

For the 2002 season, Borland became the crew chief of the No. 12 Penske Racing South Ford, driven by Ryan Newman during his rookie season. The pair would prove throughout the season that they could work well together, racking up a win at New Hampshire, six poles, 22 top-tens, 17 top-Âfives by the end of the season, finishing sixth place in the overall standings and winning the NASCAR Rookie of the Year in the process.

The pair returned to the No. 12 team for the 2003 season, with Dodges instead of Fords. The season didn't start very well, as Newman got involved in a wreck early on in the 2003 Daytona 500, finishing 43rd. However, the team would bounce back in March, winning the race at Texas, along with two poles at Atlanta and Bristol. The team would have a bad string of races in April, finishing outside of the top-35 four races in a row. Again the team bounced back getting the pole at Charlotte and also winning both the pole and the race a week later at Dover. Over the course of the season, the team would get six more wins and seven more poles. However, inconsistency plagued the team during the season, and despite having the most poles and wins through the season, they finished 6th overall in the standings.

The 2004 season brought the pair back together again, this time for only two wins, and nine poles, finishing seventh in the standings.

In 2005, the team's stats decreased again, this time only winning once at New Hampshire, and getting eight poles to their name. This would a lead to a sixth in the point standings.

2006 would be the last season for Borland at Penske Racing South. This season, for the first time in his full-time career, Newman would go win-less. The team would also only get two poles, two top-fives, and five top-tens throughout the season. At Phoenix, Borland also would miss his first race of his career since going full-time with Newman in 2002.

For 2007, Borland would join Michael Waltrip Racing for ten races, taking over the crew chief position for the No. 44 team, driven by Dale Jarrett. The team would struggle, only finishing in the top 25 one time.

Throughout the 2008 season, Borland would be the crew chief for three different drivers. Starting at Pocono, Borland joined Haas CNC Racing, becoming crew chief for the No. 66 team, driven by Scott Riggs. However, midway through the stint with Riggs, Max Papis was brought in to race the No. 66 car at Sonoma where he finished 35th. After two more races with Riggs, Borland left the team and joined No Fear Racing for one race at Daytona, joining the No. 60 car, driven by Boris Said. The pair would eventually finish 35th after getting caught up in a wreck.

In 2012, Borland would return to NASCAR, rejoining Haas CNC Racing, now known as Stewart–Haas Racing, for three races. This would reunite Borland with Ryan Newman as Borland was put in charge of the No. 39 team, which was being driven by Newman. The pair would finish off the season with a third place at Homestead, and Newman would finish the season 14th in the standings.

For 2013, Borland replaced Tony Gibson as Ryan Newman's crew chief as Gibson moved over to the No. 10 team. The team would dominate and win at Indianapolis, Newman's hometrack, clinching themselves into the chase. Over the course of the season, the team would get one win, two poles, six top-fives, and 18 top-tens leaving Newman with an 11th place finish in the point standings. This would be the last season at Stewart–Haas Racing for Newman, as he would go to Richard Childress Racing the following to replace Jeff Burton. However, for Borland at the time, there was no room for him.

During the 2016 season, Borland was brought to Richard Childress Racing, becoming the crew chief for a race for both Ty Dillon and Paul Menard.

The following season, Borland would join the No. 27 team, driven by Paul Menard, full-time. The team would only get three top-tens and 2 top-fives, leading to a 23rd place finish in the point standings.

In 2018, Borland was moved to Germain Racing, which fielded the No. 13 car, that was going to be driven by Ty Dillon. Over the course of Dillon's rookie season, the team would only get one top-ten during the July race at Daytona, where they finished sixth.

Borland returned to Germain Racing in 2019. During the season, the team racked up two stage wins. On August 26, 2019, he was indefinitely suspended for violating NASCAR's Substance Abuse Policy. Borland was tested positive for the banned substance DMAA; he and Germain Racing owner Bob Germain Jr. said a derivative of DMAA was an ingredient in the diet coffee he was drinking for six months prior to the suspension. Germain Racing confirmed that Justin Alexander, who serves as crew chief for the part time No. 21 Xfinity Series car for RCR (who Germain has an alliance with), would serve as interim crew chief beginning at Darlington and until Borland’s suspension was lifted. On September 24, NASCAR reinstated Borland after he completed the Road to Recovery Program.

2020 would be Borland's last year at Germain Racing, as the team would close at the end of the season.
