= Phenylethanolamine =

Trace amine

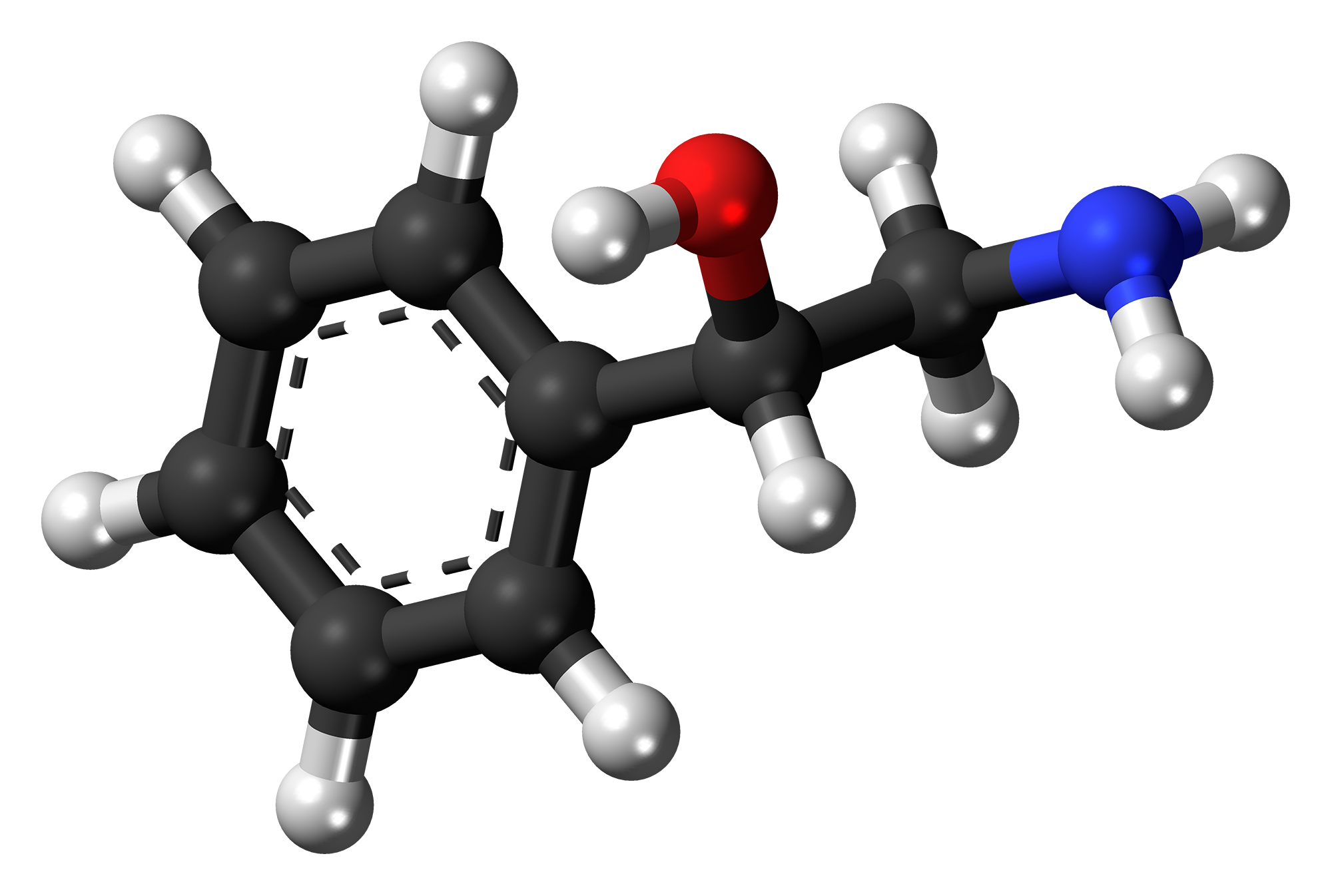

Names
- IUPAC name 2-Amino-1-phenylethanol

Identifiers
CAS Number	7568-93-6
3D model (JSmol)	Interactive image
ChEBI	CHEBI:16343
ChEMBL	ChEMBL19216
ChemSpider	975
ECHA InfoCard	100.028.609
KEGG	C02735
PubChem CID	1000
UNII	2P4Y56479O
CompTox Dashboard (EPA)	DTXSID10864094
- InChI: InChI=1S/C8H11NO/c9-6-8(10)7-4-2-1-3-5-7/h1-5,8,10H,6,9H2 Key: ULSIYEODSMZIPX-UHFFFAOYSA-N; InChI=1/C8H11NO/c9-6-8(10)7-4-2-1-3-5-7/h1-5,8,10H,6,9H2 Key: ULSIYEODSMZIPX-UHFFFAOYAE
- SMILES: OC(c1ccccc1)CN

Properties
Chemical formula	C_{8}H_{11}NO
Molar mass	137.18 g/mol
Appearance	pale yellow solid
Melting point	56 to 57 °C (133 to 135 °F; 329 to 330 K)
Boiling point	157 to 160 °C (315 to 320 °F; 430 to 433 K) at 17 mmHg
Solubility in water	soluble
- Except where otherwise noted, data are given for materials in their standard state (at 25 °C [77 °F], 100 kPa). verify (what is ?) Infobox references

Phenylethanolamine (sometimes abbreviated PEOH), or β-hydroxyphenethylamine, is a trace amine with a structure similar to those of other trace phenethylamines as well as the catecholamine neurotransmitters dopamine, norepinephrine, and epinephrine. As an organic compound, phenylethanolamine is a β-hydroxylated phenethylamine that is also structurally related to a number of synthetic drugs in the substituted phenethylamine class. In common with these compounds, phenylethanolamine has strong cardiovascular activity and, under the name Apophedrin, has been used as a drug to produce topical vasoconstriction.

In appearance, phenylethanolamine is a white solid.

Phenylethanolamine is perhaps best known in the field of bioscience as part of the enzyme name "phenylethanolamine N-methyl transferase", referring to an enzyme which is responsible for the conversion of norepinephrine into epinephrine, as well as other related transformations.

== Occurrence ==
Phenylethanolamine has been found to occur naturally in several animal species, including humans.

== Chemistry ==
=== Synthesis ===
An early synthesis of phenylethanolamine was by the reduction of 2-nitro-1-phenyl-ethanol. Other early syntheses are summarized in a paper by Hartung and Munch.

A more recent synthesis, providing a better yield, is by the reduction of benzoyl cyanide using LiAlH_{4}.

=== Properties ===
Chemically, phenyethanolamine is an aromatic compound, an amine, and an alcohol. The amino-group makes this compound a weak base, capable of reacting with acids to form salts.

Two common salts of phenylethanolamine are the hydrochloride, C_{8}H_{11}NO.HCl, m.p. 212 °C, and the sulfate, (C_{8}H_{11}NO)_{2}.H_{2}SO_{4}, m.p. 239–240 °C.

The pK_{a} of phenylethanolamine hydrochloride, at 25 °C and at a concentration of 10mM, has been recorded as 8.90.

The presence of the hydroxy-group on the benzylic carbon of the phenylethanolamine molecule creates a chiral center, so the compound exists in the form of two enantiomers, d- and l-phenylethanolamine, or as the racemic mixture, d,l-phenylethanolamine. The dextrorotatory isomer corresponds to the S-configuration, and the levorotatory isomer to the R-configuration The data given at right is for the racemate.

The synthesis of (S)-(+)-phenylethanolamine, from (+)-mandelic acid, via (+)-mandelamide, has been described. The physical constants reported in this paper are as follows: m.p. 55–57 °C; [α] = + 47.9° (c 2.4, in ethanol).

== Pharmacology ==
Early, classical pharmacological studies of phenylethanolamine were carried out by Tainter, who observed its effects after administering it to rabbits, cats and dogs. The drug produced a rapid rise in blood pressure when administered intravenously, but had little or no effect when given by any other route: doses as high as 200 mg given subcutaneously to rabbits did not alter blood pressure, nor were there any effects when the drug was intubated into the stomach.

In man, a total oral dose of 1 g also produced no effects.

Doses of 1–5 mg/kg, intravenously, caused no definite changes in respiration in cats or rabbits, and additional experiments showed that phenylethanolamine had no broncho-dilatory properties in animals. There was a similar lack of effect when the drug was given subcutaneously to man.

In vivo and in vitro experiments involving cat and rabbit intestinal smooth muscle showed that the drug produced relaxation and inhibition.

A detailed examination of the mydriatic effect of phenylethanolamine led Tainter to conclude that this drug acted by direct stimulation of the radial dilator muscle in the eye.

Shannon and co-workers confirmed and extended some of Tainter's studies. After administering phenylethanolamine to dogs intravenously, these investigators observed that 10–30 mg/kg of the drug increased pupil diameter, and decreased body temperature; a dose of 10 or 17.5 mg/kg decreased heart rate, but a 30 mg/kg dose caused it to increase. Other effects that were noted included profuse salivation and piloerection. Phenylethanolamine also produced behavioral effects such as stereotyped head movement, rapid eye movement, and repetitive tongue extrusion. These and other observations were suggested to be consistent with an action on α- and β-adrenergic receptors.

Research by Carpéné and co-workers showed that phenylethanolamine did not significantly stimulate lipolysis in cultured adipocytes ("fat cells") from guinea pig or human. Moderate stimulation (intrinsic activities about half that of the reference standard, isoprenaline) was observed in adipocytes from rat or hamster. This lipolysis was inhibited completely by bupranolol (considered to be a non-selective β-blocker), CGP 20712A (considered to be a selective β_{1}-antagonist), and ICI 118,551 (considered to be a selective β_{2}-antagonist), but not by SR 59230A (considered to be a selective β_{3}-antagonist).

Using a β_{2} adrenergic receptor preparation derived from transfected HEK 293 cells, Liappakis and co-workers found that in wild-type receptors, racemic phenylethanolamine had ~ 1/400 x the affinity of epinephrine, and ~ 1/7 x the affinity of norepinephrine in competition experiments with ^{3}[H]-CGP-12177.

The two enantiomers of phenylethanolamine were studied for their interaction with the human trace amine associated receptor (TAAR1) by a research group at Eli Lilly. From experiments with human TAAR1 expressed in rGα_{s}AV12-664 cells, Wainscott and co-workers observed that R-(−)-phenylethanolamine (referred to as "R-(−)-β-hydroxy-β-phenylethylamine") had an ED_{50} of ~1800 nM, with an E_{max} of ~ 110%, whereas S-(+)-phenylethanolamine (referred to as "S-(+)-β-hydroxy-β-phenylethylamine") had an ED_{50} of ~1720 nM, with an E_{max} of ~ 105%. In comparison, β-phenethylamine itself had an ED_{50} of ~106 nM, with an E_{max} of ~ 100%. In other words, phenylethanolamine is a TAAR1 agonist and trace amine.

== Pharmacokinetics ==
The pharmacokinetics of phenylethanolamine, after intravenous administration to dogs, were studied by Shannon and co-workers, who found that the drug followed the "two-compartment model", with T_{1/2}(α) ≃ 6.8 mins and T_{1/2}(β) ≃ 34.2 mins; the "plasma half-life" of phenylethanolamine was therefore about 30 minutes.

== Biochemistry ==
Phenylethanolamine was found to be an excellent substrate for the enzyme phenylethanolamine N-methyl transferase (PNMT), first isolated from monkey adrenal glands by Julius Axelrod, which transformed it into N-methylphenylethanolamine.

Subsequent studies by Rafferty and co-workers showed that substrate specificity of PNMT from bovine adrenal glands for the different enantiomers of phenylethanolamine was in the order R-(−)-PEOH > R,S-(racemic)-PEOH > S-(+)-PEOH.

== Toxicology ==
The minimum lethal dose (m.l.d.) upon subcutaneous administration to guinea pigs was ~ 1000 mg/kg; the m.l.d. upon intravenous administration to rabbits was 25–30 mg/kg.; in rats, the m.l.d. after intravenous administration was 140 mg/kg.

== See also ==
- Substituted phenethylamine
- Halostachine
- List of controlled D-methamphetamine precursors
