= Approved Drug Products with Therapeutic Equivalence Evaluations =

American pharmaceutical guidance book

Approved Drug Products with Therapeutic Equivalence Evaluations, commonly known as the Orange Book, is a publication produced by the United States Food and Drug Administration (FDA), as required by the Drug Price and Competition Act (Hatch-Waxman Act).

The Hatch-Waxman Act was created to '"strike a balance between two competing policy interests:

1. inducing pioneering research and development of new drugs and
2. enabling competitors to bring low-cost, generic copies of those drugs to market'".

The Orange Book identifies drug products approved on the basis of safety and effectiveness by the Food and Drug Administration (FDA) under the Federal Food, Drug, and Cosmetic Act. The publication does not include drugs on the market approved only on the basis of safety (covered by the ongoing Drug Efficacy Study Implementation [DESI] review [e.g., Donnatal Tablets and Librax Capsules] or pre-1938 drugs [e.g., Phenobarbital Tablets]). The main criterion for the inclusion of any product is that the product is the subject of an application with an effective approval that has not been withdrawn for safety or efficacy reasons. Inclusion of products on the List is independent of any current regulatory action through administrative or judicial means against a drug product.

In addition, the Orange Book contains therapeutic equivalence evaluations (2 character rating codes) for approved multisource prescription drug products (generic drugs). These evaluations have been prepared to serve as public information and advice to state health agencies, prescribers, and pharmacists to promote public education in the area of drug product selection and to foster containment of health care costs. Therapeutic equivalence evaluations in this publication are not official FDA actions affecting the legal status of products under the Act.

Finally, the Orange Book lists patents that are purported to protect each drug. Patent listings and use codes are provided by the drug application owner, and the FDA is obliged to list them. In order for a generic drug manufacturer to win approval of a drug under the Hatch-Waxman Act, the generic manufacturer must certify that they will not launch their generic until after the expiration of the Orange Book-listed patent, or that the patent is invalid, unenforceable, or that the generic product will not infringe the listed patent.

The Orange Book does not list biological products such as vaccines. These are listed in later-enacted Lists of Licensed Biological Products with Reference Product Exclusivity and Biosimilarity or Interchangeability Evaluations, commonly known as the Purple Book.

The DrugPatentWatch website offers a "Free DrugPatentWatch Orange Book PDF Library" from which the public can download digital copies of every FDA Orange Book, from the 1st Edition in 1980 to the most recent (as of 2020).
