= Thermogenics =

Stimulants which produce heat

Thermogenic means tending to produce heat, and the term is commonly applied to drugs which increase heat through metabolic stimulation, or to microorganisms which create heat within organic waste. Approximately all enzymatic reaction in the human body is thermogenic, which gives rise to the basal metabolic rate.

In bodybuilding, athletes wishing to reduce body fat percentage use thermogenics in order to attempt to increase their basal metabolic rate, thereby increasing overall energy expenditure. Caffeine and ephedrine are commonly used for this purpose in the ECA stack. 2,4-Dinitrophenol (DNP) is a very strong thermogenic drug used for fat loss which produces a dose-dependent increase in body temperature, to the point where it can induce death by hyperthermia. It works as a mitochondrial oxidative phosphorylation uncoupler, disrupting the mitochondrial electron transport chain. This stops the mitochondria from producing adenosine triphosphate, causing energy to be released as heat.
