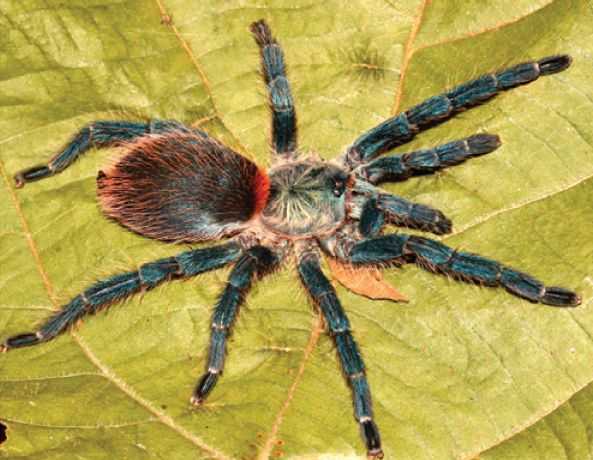
- Female Dolichothele diamantinensis

Scientific classification
- Kingdom: Animalia
- Phylum: Arthropoda
- Subphylum: Chelicerata
- Class: Arachnida
- Order: Araneae
- Infraorder: Mygalomorphae
- Family: Theraphosidae
- Genus: Dolichothele; Mello-Leitão, 1923

Type species
- Dolichothele exilis Mello-Leitão, 1923

Species
- 10, see text

Synonyms
- Cenobiopelma Mello-Leitão & Arlé, 1934; Goniodontium Mello-Leitão, 1923; Oligoxystre Vellard, 1924; Pseudoligoxystre Vol, 2001

= Dolichothele =

Genus of spiders

Dolichothele is a genus of spiders in the family Theraphosidae found in Brazil and Bolivia. It was first described in 1923 by Mello-Leitão.

== Diagnosis ==
It owns a labium, which has less than 10 cuspules, also owning undivided tarsal scopula on legs 1 through 3, leg 4 being undivided with a band of hairs. The tarsal claws of males also lack teeth, and the spermathecae owning multiple lobules.

== Species ==
As of July 2022, the World Spider Catalog accepted the following 10 species:

- Dolichothele auratum (Vellard, 1924) – Brazil
- Dolichothele bolivianum (Vol, 2001) – Bolivia, Brazil
- Dolichothele camargorum Revollo, Silva & Bertani, 2017 - Bolivia, Brazil
- Dolichothele diamantinensis (Bertani, Santos & Righi, 2009) – Brazil
- Dolichothele dominguense (Guadanucci, 2007) – Brazil
- Dolichothele exilis Mello-Leitão, 1923 – Brazil
- Dolichothele mineirum (Guadanucci, 2011) – Brazil
- Dolichothele mottai Revollo, Silva & Bertani, 2017 - Brazil
- Dolichothele rufoniger (Guadanucci, 2007) – Brazil
- Dolichothele tucuruiense (Guadanucci, 2007) – Brazil

=== In synonymy ===
- Dolichothele caatinga (Guadanucci, 2007) = Dolichothele exilis
- Dolichothele muticum (Mello-Leitão, 1923) = Dolichothele exilis
- Dolichothele nigrioculatum (Bücherl, Timotheo & Lucas, 1971) = Dolichothele exilis

=== Nomen dubium ===
- Dolichothele mimeticum (Mello-Leitão & Arlé, 1934) - Brazil
