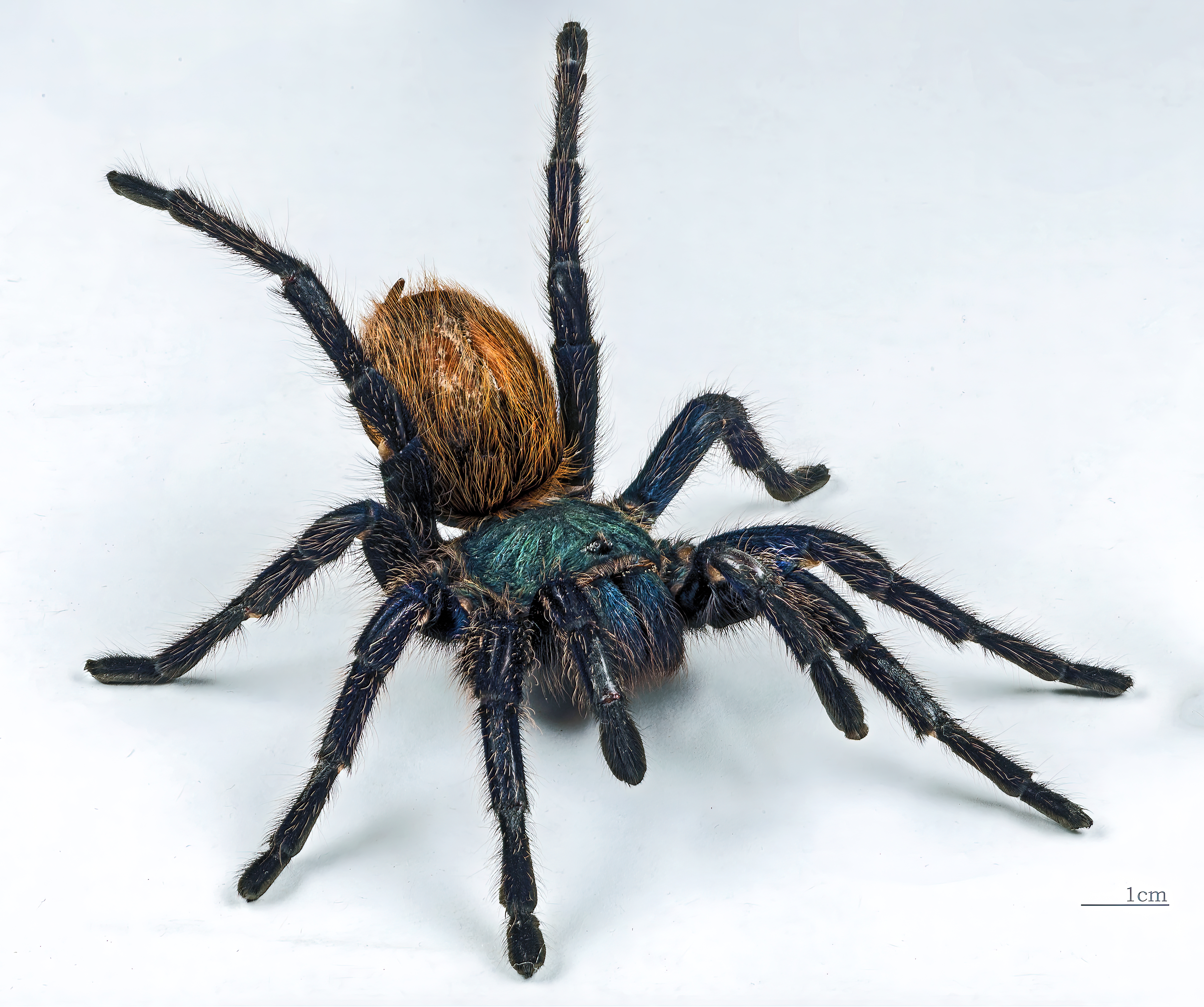
- Adult female
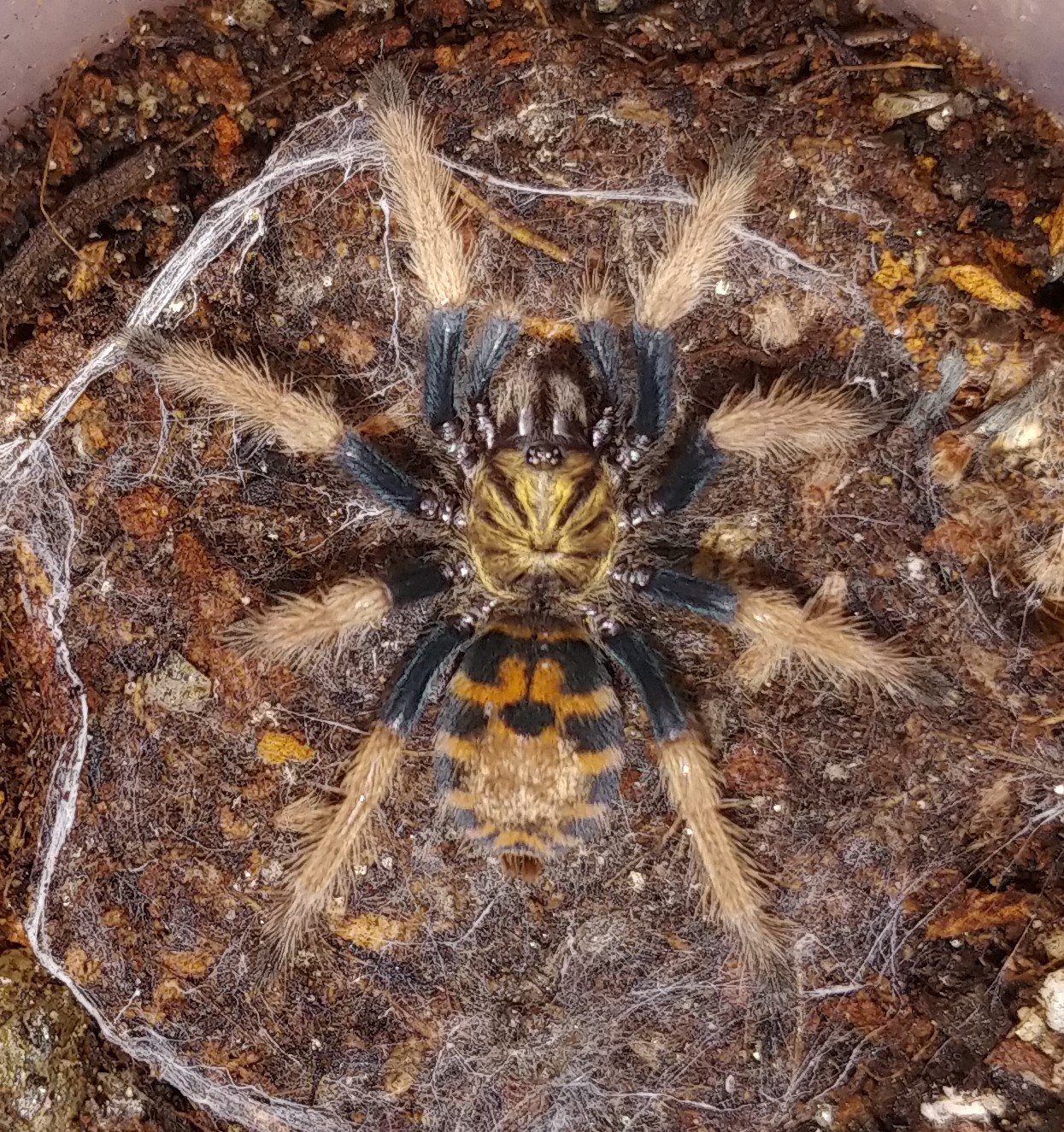
- Juvenile

Scientific classification
- Kingdom: Animalia
- Phylum: Arthropoda
- Subphylum: Chelicerata
- Class: Arachnida
- Order: Araneae
- Infraorder: Mygalomorphae
- Family: Theraphosidae
- Genus: Chromatopelma; Schmidt, 1995
- Species: C. cyaneopubescens

Binomial name
- Chromatopelma cyaneopubescens (Strand, 1907)

= Greenbottle blue tarantula =

Genus of spiders

Chromatopelma is a monotypic genus of South American tarantulas containing the single species, Chromatopelma cyaneopubescens. Commonly known as Paraguaná's blue tarantula or greenbottle blue tarantulas due to their metallic blue legs and blue-green carapace, they are very active and fast-growing tarantulas that are particularly attractive to hobbyists. They are native to the Paraguaná Peninsula.

They live in webbed burrows under bushes and tree roots in desert areas of northern Venezuela. The entrance is often extended with webbing, sometimes resembling a funnel shape. These webs may protect the entrance from the harsh desert climate and act as a trap for insects. Their diet can consist of many things. These include crickets, cockroaches and also worms.

In 2013, Venezuelan scientists announced that greenbottle blue tarantulas were threatened by overgrazing that is destroying their habitat. Fumigation of cultivated land has also caused the migration of the species towards the Montecano Biological Reserve and the Cerro Santa Ana Natural Monument. In 2015 it was listed as an endangered species of Venezuela.

== Taxonomy ==
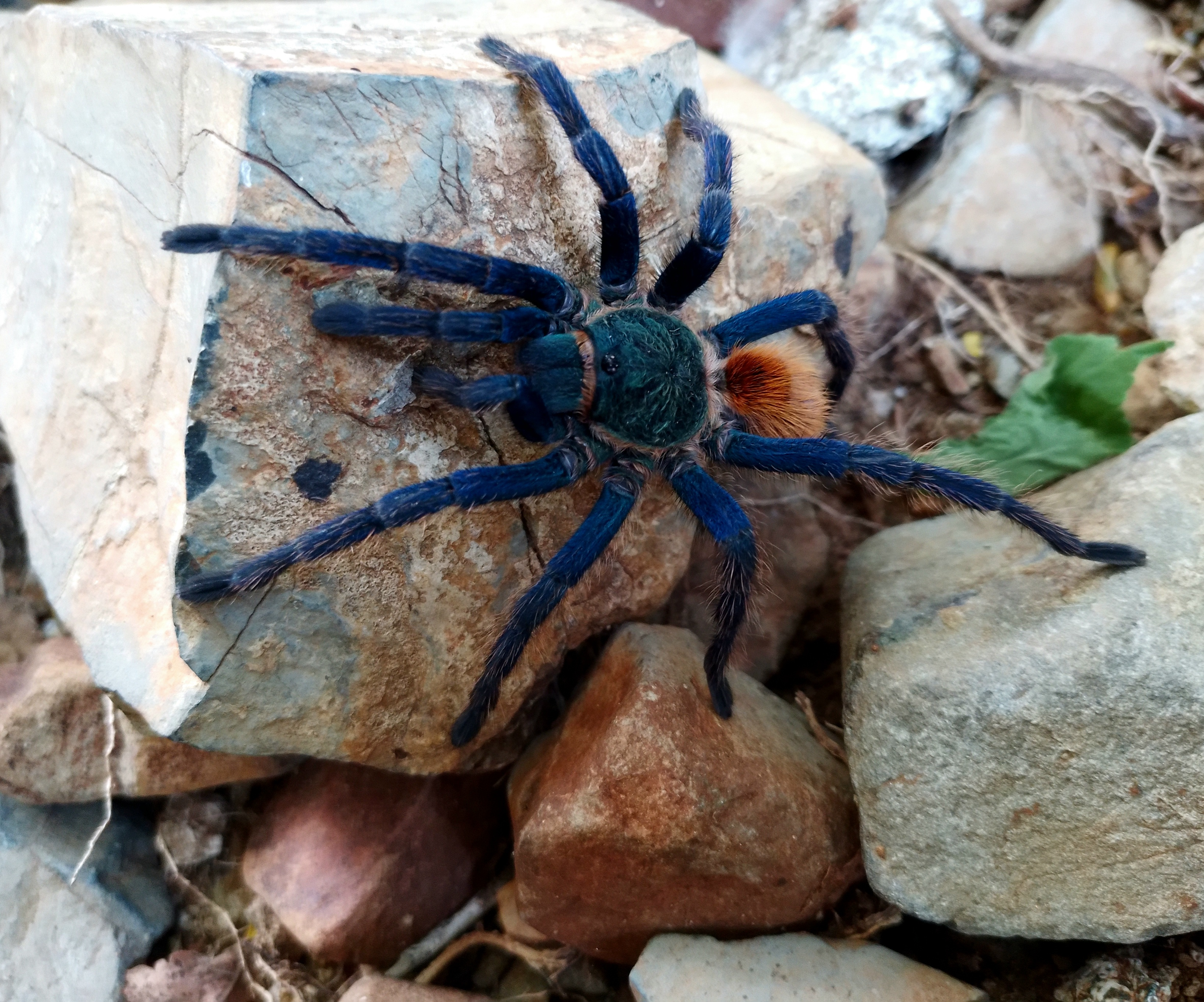
At Cerro Santa Ana, Paraguaná Peninsula, Venezuela

The species was first described by Embrik Strand in 1907 under the name Eurypelma cyaneopubescens, and was moved to the newly created genus Delopelma by Alexander Petrunkevitch in 1939. Delopelma and Eurypelma are now considered to be a synonyms of Aphonopelma and Avicularia, respectively.

In 1997, Gunter Schmidt considered the species sufficiently distinct to warrant the new genus Chromatopelma, a name referring to its striking blue color. He differentiated Chromatopelma from Aphonopelma based on the scopulae of the tarsus on the third leg, bristles that divide the metatarsus from the tarsus on the fourth leg, the very large posterior median eyes, and the single fused spermatheca of females.
