= Halostachine =

Alkaloid

Names
- IUPAC name 2-(Methylamino)-1-phenylethanol
- Other names N-Methylphenylethanolamine; 1-Hydroxy-1-phenyl-2-methylaminoethane; α-(Methylaminomethyl)benzyl alcohol; 2-Methylamino-1-phenylethanol

Identifiers
CAS Number	495-42-1
3D model (JSmol)	Interactive image
ChEBI	CHEBI:16913
ChEMBL	ChEMBL1241267
ChemSpider	5323580
EC Number	229-525-5
KEGG	C03711
PubChem CID	913 (racemate)
UNII	AIH8FLV35K
CompTox Dashboard (EPA)	DTXSID00879576
- InChI: InChI=1S/C9H13NO/c1-10-7-9(11)8-5-3-2-4-6-8/h2-6,9-11H,7H2,1H3/t9-/m0/s1 Key: ZCTYHONEGJTYQV-VIFPVBQESA-N
- SMILES: O[C@@H](CNC)C1=CC=CC=C1

Properties
Chemical formula	C_{9}H_{13}NO
Molar mass	151.209 g·mol^{−1}
Appearance	Colorless solid
Melting point	43 to 45 °C (109 to 113 °F; 316 to 318 K) (R- or S- enantiomer); 75–76 °C (racemate)

Hazards
- GHS labelling
Pictograms	(GHS07: Exclamation mark)
Signal word	Warning
Hazard statements	H302, H332
Precautionary statements	P261, P264, P270, P271, P301+P312, P304+P312, P304+P340, P312, P330, P501
- Except where otherwise noted, data are given for materials in their standard state (at 25 °C [77 °F], 100 kPa). Infobox references

Halostachine (also known as N-methylphenylethanolamine) is a natural product, an alkaloid first isolated from the Asian shrub Halostachys caspica (synonym Halostachys belangeriana), and structurally a β-hydroxy-phenethylamine (a phenylethanolamine) related to its better-known "parent" biogenic amine, phenylethanolamine, to the adrenergic drug synephrine, and to the alkaloid ephedrine. The pharmacological properties of halostachine have some similarity to those of these structurally-related compounds, and Halostachys caspica extracts have been included as a constituent of certain OTC dietary supplements, but halostachine has never been developed as a prescription drug. Although it is found in nature as a single stereoisomer, halostachine is more commonly available as a synthetic product in the form of its racemate (see below). In appearance it is a colorless solid.

== Occurrence ==
Naturally-occurring halostachine was first discovered by Syrneva in the halophytic plant Halostachys caspica (now classed as Halostachys belangeriana) (family Amaranthaceae). The erroneous structure originally proposed for this compound was subsequently corrected by Menshikov and Rubinstein.

Halostachine has also been isolated from perennial ryegrass, Lolium perenne and from tall fescue, Festuca arundinacea.

The presence of N-methylphenylethanolamine in rat brain was implied by the experiments described by Saavedra and Axelrod.

== Chemistry ==
=== Synthesis ===
Several syntheses of racemic N-methylphenylethanolamine have been published over the years. A synthesis using "classical" methodology was reported by Durden and co-workers, starting from acetophenone. The methyl group of acetophenone was brominated with bromine to give α-bromoacetophenone, which was then reacted with N-methylbenzylamine to give an amino-ketone. The amino-ketone was reduced with lithium aluminium hydride to the corresponding amino-alcohol, and the N-benzyl group finally removed by hydrogenolysis using palladium on carbon under an atmosphere of hydrogen gas at 31 psi.

Another synthesis, due to Nordlander and co-workers, began with the Friedel-Crafts acylation of benzene by N-(trifluoroacetyl)glycyl chloride in the presence of aluminum chloride. The resulting N-(trifluoroacetyl)-α-aminoacetophenone was then N-methylated with methyl iodide and potassium carbonate, and the product finally converted to racemic N-methylphenylethanolamine by means of sodium borohydride in ethanol.

An efficient, stereospecific synthesis of halostachine was reported by Zandbergen and co-workers: (R)-(+)-α-hydroxybenzeneacetonitrile was first O-protected using 2-methoxypropene. The product was then treated with DIBAL, and the unisolated imine then treated sequentially with ammonium bromide and methylamine to effect "transimination". The resulting N-methylimine was converted to (R)-(−)-α-[(methylamino)methyl]benzenemethanol (i.e. (R)-(−)-halostachine) with sodium borohydride.

=== Properties ===
Chemically, N-methylphenyethanolamine is an aromatic compound, an amine, and an alcohol. The amino-group makes this compound a weak base, capable of reacting with acids to form salts.

One common salt of N-methylphenylethanolamine is the (racemic) hydrochloride, C_{9}H_{13}NO.HCl, m.p. 103-104 °C.

The pK_{a} of N-methylphenylethanolamine hydrochloride, at 25 °C and at a concentration of 10 mM, is 9.29.

The presence of the hydroxy-group on the benzylic C of the N-methylphenylethanolamine molecule creates a chiral center, so the compound exists in the form of two enantiomers, d- and l-N-methylphenylethanolamine, or as the racemic mixture, d,l- N-methylphenylethanolamine. The dextrorotatory isomer corresponds to the S-configuration, and the levorotatory isomer to the R-configuration.

The N-methylphenylethanolamine isolated from Halostachys caspica, and given the alkaloid name "halostachine", was found to be the levorotatory enantiomer.

Halostachine has a melting point of 43-45 °C and [α]_{D} = - 47.03°; the hydrochloride salt of this enantiomer has m.p. 113-114 °C, and [α]_{D} = - 52.21°. The resolution of racemic N-methylphenylethanolamine, by means of its tartrate salts, yielded enantiomers with specific rotations of [α]_{D} = - 52.46° and + 52.78°.

== Pharmacology ==
The first pharmacological investigation of synthetic, racemic N-methylphenylethanolamine (referred to as "methylphenylethanolamine" by these authors) was carried out by Barger and Dale, who found it to be a pressor, with a potency similar to that of phenylethanolamine and β-phenylethylamine in a cat preparation. Subsequently, this compound (still in the form of its racemate) was studied more thoroughly by Chen and co-workers, who confirmed its pressor activity, but observed that it was about one-half as potent as phenylethanolamine after i.v. administration in a cat preparation: a total dose of 5 × 10^{−6} M (or ~ 1 mg of the HCl salt) caused a maximum rise in blood pressure of 26 mm Hg. Additional experiments by these investigators showed that racemic N-methylphenylethanolamine also caused mydriasis in the rabbit eye (instillation of a drop of 0.05 M/L solution producing about 5 × as much dilation as the same dose of phenylethanolamine), inhibition of isolated rabbit intestine strips, and contraction of isolated guinea pig uterus. The drug was also astringent on nasal mucosa.

In man, an oral dose of 50 mg produced no effects on blood pressure, but this is only according to a single study from 1929.

Later studies by Lands and Grant on the effects of racemic N-methylphenylethanolamine (identified by the Sterling-Winthrop company codes "WIN 5529" or "WIN 5529-2") on blood pressure in intact dogs showed similar results to those obtained by Chen et al.: 0.41 mg/kg of the drug, given i.v., caused a rise in blood pressure of 38 mm Hg lasting 3–10 minutes. This effect was described as being ~ 1/200 × that produced by the same dose of epinephrine (or ~ 1/250 × when compared on a molar basis).

In sheep, halostachine produced only a slight mydriasis at a dose of 30 mg/kg, i.v., and "excitation" at 100 mg/kg; in guinea pigs, doses of 30 mg/kg, i.p., produced restlessness lasting about 1/2 hour, but 100 mg/kg, i.p., caused excitement, mydriasis, salivation, piloerection, muscular tremors, and increased heart and respiratory rates, with a return to normal after 1/2–2 hours.

Intravenous administration of the drug to dogs, in doses of ~ 6 – 18 mg/kg, was found to produce significant mydriasis (a 100% increase in pupil diameter resulting from a dose of 17.5 mg/kg), the effect being somewhat greater (~ 1.3 x) than that produced by the same doses of phenylethanolamine. N-Methylphenylethanolamine also caused a decrease in heart rate which was inversely related to the dose (i.e. progressively larger doses caused less bradycardia), and which was quantitatively less than that produced by the same doses of phenylethanolamine. The drug produced a fall in body temperature which was also inversely correlated with the dose, and which was smaller than that produced by the same doses of phenylethanolamine. Additional symptoms that were observed included profuse salivation and piloerection, although, in contrast to phenylethanolamine, N-methylphenylethanolamine did not produce any stereotyped or rapid eye movements. These results led the authors to suggest that N-methylphenylethanolamine was acting on both α and β adrenergic receptors.

Using a β_{2} adrenergic receptor preparation derived from transfected HEK 293 cells, Liappakis and co-workers found that in wild-type receptors, racemic N-methylphenylethanolamine (referred to by these authors as "halostachine") had ~ 1/120 × the affinity of epinephrine in competition experiments with ^{3}[H]-CGP-12177, and was therefore about 3 × more potent than phenylethanolamine itself. Measurements of cAMP accumulation in intact transfected HEK 293 cells, after treatment with EEDQ to inactivate 98-99% of the receptors, indicated that "halostachine" was ~ 19% as effective as epinephrine in maximally-stimulating the cAMP accumulation in the wild-type receptors. "Halostachine" was thus interpreted as having partial agonist properties at β_{2} receptors.

== Pharmacodynamics ==
The pharmacokinetics of N-methylphenylethanolamine, after i.v. administration to dogs, were studied by Shannon and co-workers, who found that the drug followed the "two-compartment model", with T_{1/2}(α) ≃ 9.7 minutes and T_{1/2}(β) ≃ 56.4 minutes; the "plasma half-life" of N-methylphenylethanolamine was therefore about 1 hour.

== Biochemistry ==
In animal tissue, N-methylphenylethanolamine is formed by the action of the enzyme phenylethanolamine N-methyl transferase (PNMT), first isolated from monkey adrenal glands by Julius Axelrod, on phenylethanolamine.

The actions of monoamine oxidases MAO-A and MAO-B from rat brain mitochondria on N-methylphenylethanolamine were characterized by Osamu and co-workers, who found that at a concentration of 10 μM, this compound (stereochemical identity unspecified) was a specific substrate for MAO-B, but at 100 μM and 1000 μM it became a substrate for both MAO-A and MAO-B. The kinetic constants reported by these researchers were: K_{m} = 27.7 μM; V_{max} = 3.67 nM/mg protein/30 mins (high affinity), and K_{m} = 143 μM; V_{max} = 7.87 nM/mg protein/30 mins (low affinity).

== Toxicity ==
The LD_{50} of N-methylphenylethanolamine in mouse is reported as 44 mg/kg, i.v., and ~ 140 mg/kg, i.p. (racemic; HCl salt).; in an earlier paper from the same year, Lands notes an approximate LD_{50} of 490 mg/kg (mouse, i.p.) for what is ostensibly the same drug, but coded as "WIN 5529", rather than "WIN 5529-2".

The minimum lethal dose of the racemate in rabbits, i.v., is given as 100 mg/kg.

Studies carried out to determine whether halostachine might be responsible for causing "ryegrass staggers" in Australia involved the administration of doses up to 100 mg/kg, i.v., in sheep, and 100 mg/kg, i.p., in guinea pigs, without any indication of lethality. Although apparently adrenergic effects were evident in the guinea pigs (see "Pharmacology", above), the investigators concluded that halostachine was unlikely to be the cause of the "staggers" syndrome.

== See also ==
- Phenylethanolamine
