= Fagaramide =

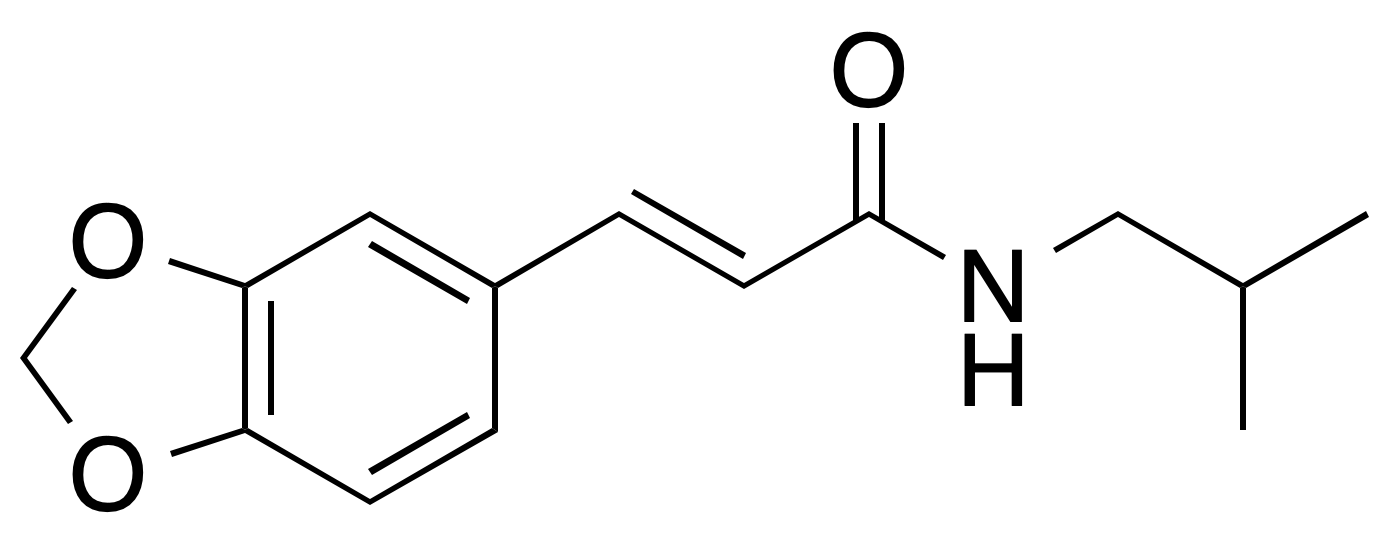

Names
- Preferred IUPAC name (2E)-3-(2H-1,3-Benzodioxol-5-yl)-N-(2-methylpropyl)prop-2-enamide
- Other names: trans-Fagaramide; N-Isobutyl-3,4-methylenedioxy-trans-cinnamamide

Identifiers
CAS Number	495-86-3 trans isomer; 60045-88-7 unspecified stereochemistry
3D model (JSmol)	Interactive image
ChEBI	CHEBI:4966
ChEMBL	ChEMBL252709
ChemSpider	4445085
KEGG	C10455
PubChem CID	5281772
UNII	C2UHL92KKP
CompTox Dashboard (EPA)	DTXSID001318385
- InChI: InChI=1S/C14H17NO3/c1-10(2)8-15-14(16)6-4-11-3-5-12-13(7-11)18-9-17-12/h3-7,10H,8-9H2,1-2H3,(H,15,16)/b6-4+ Key: WKWYNAMJWDRHBP-GQCTYLIASA-N
- SMILES: CC(C)CNC(=O)/C=C/C1=CC2=C(C=C1)OCO2

Properties
Chemical formula	C_{14}H_{17}NO_{3}
Molar mass	247.294 g·mol^{−1}
- Except where otherwise noted, data are given for materials in their standard state (at 25 °C [77 °F], 100 kPa). Infobox references

Fagaramide is a naturally occurring compound found in various species of Zanthoxylum plants. It, and analogs based on its skeleton, have been investigated for various biological effects. The relatively simple structure and ease of synthesis have allowed production of libraries of related compounds.
