= Calcium fructoborate =

Identifiers
CAS Number	250141-42-5
3D model (JSmol)	Interactive image
ChemSpider	8137902
PubChem CID	85076954
UNII	7EW2EZ38LS
- InChI: InChI=1S/2C12H20BO12.Ca/c2*14-1-5-7(18)9-11(3-16,20-5)24-13(22-9)23-10-8(19)6(2-15)21-12(10,4-17)25-13;/h2*5-10,14-19H,1-4H2;/q2*-1;+2 Key: HRSMKOBEJUELDV-UHFFFAOYSA-N
- SMILES: [Ca++].OC[C@H]1O[C@@]2(CO)O[B-]3(O[C@H]2[C@@H]1O)O[C@H]1[C@H](O)[C@@H](CO)O[C@@]1(CO)O3.OC[C@H]1O[C@@]2(CO)O[B-]3(O[C@H]2[C@@H]1O)O[C@H]1[C@H](O)[C@@H](CO)O[C@@]1(CO)O3

Properties
Chemical formula	C_{24}H_{40}B_{2}CaO_{24}
Molar mass	774.26 g·mol^{−1}
- Except where otherwise noted, data are given for materials in their standard state (at 25 °C [77 °F], 100 kPa). Infobox references

Calcium fructoborate is a salt of an organoboron compound containing boron (and fructose and calcium). Its structural formula is Ca[(C_{6}H_{10}O_{6})_{2}B]_{2}.

It is naturally found in some plants, and is also manufactured and promoted as a dietary supplement.
