= Bupranolol =

Medication

Clinical data
- AHFS/Drugs.com: International Drug Names
- Routes of administration: Oral, topical (eye drops)
- ATC code: C07AA19 (WHO)

Pharmacokinetic data
- Bioavailability: < 10%
- Protein binding: 76%
- Metabolism: First pass elimination > 90%
- Elimination half-life: 2-4 hours (plasma)
- Excretion: > 88% renal (as carboxybupranolol)

Identifiers
- IUPAC name: (RS)-1-(tert-butylamino)-3-(2-chloro-5-methylphenoxy)propan-2-ol
- CAS Number: 14556-46-8
- PubChem CID: 2475
- IUPHAR/BPS: 550
- DrugBank: DB08808
- ChemSpider: 2381
- UNII: 858YGI5PIT
- KEGG: D07590
- ChEMBL: ChEMBL305380
- CompTox Dashboard (EPA): DTXSID7022704

Chemical and physical data
- Formula: C_{14}H_{22}ClNO_{2}
- Molar mass: 271.79 g·mol^{−1}
- 3D model (JSmol): Interactive image
- SMILES: CC1=CC(=C(C=C1)Cl)OCC(CNC(C)(C)C)O
- InChI: InChI=1S/C14H22ClNO2/c1-10-5-6-12(15)13(7-10)18-9-11(17)8-16-14(2,3)4/h5-7,11,16-17H,8-9H2,1-4H3; Key:HQIRNZOQPUAHHV-UHFFFAOYSA-N

Bupranolol is a non-selective beta blocker without intrinsic sympathomimetic activity (ISA), but with strong membrane stabilizing activity. Its potency is similar to propranolol.

== Uses and dosage ==
Like other beta blockers, oral bupranolol can be used to treat hypertension and tachycardia. The initial dose is 50 mg two times a day. It can be increased to 100 mg four times a day. Bupranolol eye drops (0.05%-0.5%) are used against glaucoma.

== Pharmacology ==
Bupranolol is quickly and completely absorbed from the gut. Over 90% undergo first-pass metabolism. Bupranolol has a plasma half life of about two to four hours, with levels never reaching 1 μg/L in therapeutic doses. The main metabolite is carboxybupranolol, 4-chloro-3-[3-(1,1-dimethylethylamino)-2-hydroxy-propyloxy]benzoic acid – that is, the methyl group at the benzene ring is oxidized to a carboxyl group – of which 88% are eliminated renally within 24 hours.

== Adverse effects, contraindications, interactions ==
Adverse effects, contraindications and interactions are similar to other beta blockers.
