= N-Ethoxycarbonyl-2-ethoxy-1,2-dihydroquinoline =

Names
- Preferred IUPAC name Ethyl 2-ethoxyquinoline-1(2H)-carboxylate
- Other names Ethyl 1,2-dihydro-2-ethoxyquinoline-1-carboxylate

Identifiers
CAS Number	16357-59-8
3D model (JSmol)	Interactive image
Abbreviations	EEDQ
ChEMBL	ChEMBL1527785
ChemSpider	25898
ECHA InfoCard	100.036.728
EC Number	240-418-2
PubChem CID	27833
UNII	60O971AN19
CompTox Dashboard (EPA)	DTXSID50871969
- InChI: InChI=1S/C14H17NO3/c1-3-17-13-10-9-11-7-5-6-8-12(11)15(13)14(16)18-4-2/h5-10,13H,3-4H2,1-2H3 Key: GKQLYSROISKDLL-UHFFFAOYSA-N
- SMILES: CCOC1C=CC2=CC=CC=C2N1C(=O)OCC

Properties
Chemical formula	C_{14}H_{17}NO_{3}
Molar mass	247.29 g/mol
Melting point	62 to 67 °C (144 to 153 °F; 335 to 340 K)
- Except where otherwise noted, data are given for materials in their standard state (at 25 °C [77 °F], 100 kPa). verify (what is ?) Infobox references

N-Ethoxycarbonyl-2-ethoxy-1,2-dihydroquinoline (EEDQ) is a dopamine-receptor antagonist.

EEDQ is also a highly specific reagent for carboxyl groups. It enables the coupling of acylamino acids with amino acid esters in high yield and without racemization.

It is also an irreversible dopamine transporter (DAT) blocker in vitro, though it is ineffective in vivo.
