= ECA stack =

Drug combination used in weight loss and as a stimulant

The ECA stack is a drug combination used in weight loss and as a stimulant. ECA is an initialism for ephedrine, caffeine, and aspirin, with variants of it including the EC stack, which removes the aspirin for those who can not tolerate it. Dietary supplements based on or including elements of ECA were popular through the 1990s and early 2000s, but the marketing of ephedra- or ephedrine-containing stimulant combinations for weight loss and bodybuilding is now restricted or illegal in the United States and the Netherlands due to reports of heart attack, stroke, and death associated with these supplements.

== Use as a supplement ==
While it was available as a supplement, ECA was marketed with claims that it would aid weight loss, improve athletic performance and increase energy. Placebo-controlled studies have consistently found ephedrine in combination with caffeine to be effective in promoting moderate fat loss in the already-obese. A meta-analysis combining results from all available studies estimated average weight loss of 1 kg/month more than placebo. There is insufficient evidence to support use of ephedra for athletic performance.

Natural supplements that contain ephedra (aka Ma Huang) as an ephedrine substitute have been linked to cases of heart attack, stroke, and death in healthy young adults even when taken at the labeled dosage. A 2003 meta-analysis of all available studies and case reports concluded that: "ephedrine- and ephedra-containing dietary supplements [...] have harms in terms of a 2- to 3-fold increase in psychiatric symptoms, autonomic symptoms, upper gastrointestinal symptoms, and heart palpitations. More serious adverse effects from ephedra use cannot be excluded at a rate less than 1.0 per thousand, and case reports raise the possibility that a causal relationship with serious adverse events may exist."

=== Dosage ===
Clinical trials indicate that the most effective dose is approximately 20mg of ephedrine and 200mg of caffeine, while the most effective dose of aspirin has not been well-studied. However, this dosage has not been recommended by regulatory agencies such as the FDA and do not take into consideration mitigation of adverse side effects.

== Mechanism of action ==
The effects of the ECA stack on weight loss are primarily due to the ephedrine component. Ephedrine acts as an indirect α and β adrenergic agonist by stimulating the release of norepinephrine. Increased circulating norepinephrine in the body then acts on brown adipose tissue and skeletal muscle by increasing cyclic adenosine monophosphate (cAMP) levels. This causes a thermogenic effect, raising bodily heat production and increasing energy consumption in conjunction with the rest of the stack.

However, the body's negative feedback systems quickly activate to normalize metabolism. This takes the form of elevated phosphodiesterase enzyme activity within the cells, as well as prostaglandin release in the synaptic junctions; both of these degrade cAMP and mitigate the thermogenic effects. Adenosine release in the brain additionally speeds the breakdown of cAMP. Caffeine inhibits the production of phosphodiesterase inside the cell and therefore slows the degradation of cAMP. It also binds with and competitively inhibits adenosine receptors in the brain, triggering the release of epinephrine and increasing cAMP levels further. Aspirin inhibits prostaglandin production outside of the cells, which, in conjunction with caffeine, greatly prolongs the thermogenic effects and increased metabolism by sustaining elevated cAMP levels.

Additionally, Ephedrine acts as an anorectic, or appetite-suppressing drug. However, the anorectic effect becomes less pronounced over time, as the body becomes tolerant of ephedrine to some degree. An estimated 75% of the efficacy of the ECA stack can be attributed to decreased appetite, while the remaining 25% is due to the thermogenic effects of the stack.

The stimulating effects of caffeine and ephedrine are an additional contributing factor to weight loss. The stack's effect on the central nervous system results in increased aerobic exercise performance, measured as time until exhaustion relative to respiratory metrics.

== Legal status ==
Due to deaths linked to ephedra-containing dietary supplements and the potential use of ephedrine as a precursor in illegal methamphetamine manufacture, many countries have taken steps to regulate these products.

=== Status in the United States ===
In the United States, it is illegal to market products containing ephedrine or ephedra alkaloids as a dietary supplement. In 2004, ephedra, a botanical source of ephedrine alkaloids, was banned by the U.S. Food and Drug Administration due to serious safety concerns, injuries, and deaths linked to ephedra-containing supplements. However, ephedrine itself has never been illegal in the United States and is currently available over-the-counter. Reporting requirements and quantity limitations vary by state.

A Congressional report said that when an ephedra supplement company, Metabolife, in the USA was forced to release adverse event reports, cardiac and psychological reports were recorded in healthy young people at normal dosages.

=== Status in Canada ===
In January 2002, Health Canada issued a voluntary recall of all ephedrine products containing more than 8 mg per dose, all combinations of ephedrine with other stimulants such as caffeine, and all ephedrine products marketed for weight-loss or bodybuilding indications, citing a serious risk to health.

As of June 28, 2024 all provinces and territories require single-ingredient ephedrine and pseudoephedrine products in retail settings to be sold behind the counter in pharmacies, and by pharmacists (or, in some cases, also by individuals working under the supervision of a pharmacist, such as pharmacy technicians), to prevent their misuse and diversion for unlawful purposes.

=== Status in Denmark ===
An EC formulation called Letigen which combined 20 mg of synthetic ephedrine and 200 mg of caffeine (recommended dose: 1-3 pills per day depending on user tolerance) was approved for sale by prescription in Denmark in 1990. During the peak of its use (in 1999) roughly 2% of the Danish population was using it. That product's marketing was discontinued in 2002 upon the same sort of adverse reports seen in other countries.
