= Biogenic amine =

Biogenic substance with one or more amine groups

A biogenic amine is a biogenic substance with one or more amine groups. They are basic nitrogenous compounds formed mainly by decarboxylation of amino acids or by amination and transamination of aldehydes and ketones. Biogenic amines are organic bases with low molecular weight and are synthesized by microbial, vegetable and animal metabolisms. In food and beverages they are formed by the enzymes of raw material or are generated by microbial decarboxylation of amino acids.

== List of notable biogenic amines ==
=== Monoamines ===
Some prominent examples of biogenic monoamines include:

Monoamine neurotransmitters

- Imidazoleamines
  - Histamine – a substance derived from the amino acid histidine that acts as a neurotransmitter mediating arousal and attention, as well as a pro-inflammatory signal released from mast cells in response to allergic reactions or tissue damage. Histamine is also an important stimulant of HCl secretion by the stomach through histamine H_{2} receptors.
- Indolamines
  - Serotonin – a central nervous system neurotransmitter derived from the amino acid tryptophan involved in regulating mood, sleep, appetite, and sexuality.
- The three catecholamine neurotransmitters:
  - Norepinephrine (noradrenaline) – a neurotransmitter involved in sleep and wakefulness, attention, and feeding behavior, as well as a stress hormone released by the adrenal glands that regulates the sympathetic nervous system.
  - Epinephrine (adrenaline) – an adrenal stress hormone, as well as a neurotransmitter present at lower levels in the brain.
  - Dopamine – a neurotransmitter involved in motivation, reward, addiction, behavioral reinforcement, and coordination of bodily movement.

Trace amines (endogenous amines that activate the human TAAR1 receptor)

- Phenethylamines (related to catecholamines):
  - Phenethylamine (PEA)
  - N-Methylphenethylamine (endogenous amphetamine isomer)
  - Phenylethanolamine
  - m-Tyramine
  - p-Tyramine
  - 3-Methoxytyramine
  - N-Methyltyramine
  - m-Octopamine
  - p-Octopamine
  - Synephrine
- Thyronamine compounds:
  - 3-Iodothyronamine
- Tryptamine

Tryptamines

- N-Methyltryptamine (NMT)
- N,N-Dimethyltryptamine (DMT)

Other biogenic monoamines

- Trimethylamine
- Trimethylamine N-oxide
- Indoleamines
  - Melatonin
  - 6-Hydroxymelatonin
  - N-Acetylserotonin

=== Polyamines ===
Examples of notable biogenic polyamines include:

- Agmatine
- Cadaverine
- Putrescine
- Spermine
- Spermidine

== Physiological importance ==
There is a distinction between endogenous and exogenous biogenic amines. Endogenous amines are produced in many different tissues (for example: adrenaline in adrenal medulla or histamine in mast cells and liver). Serotonin, an endogenous amine, is a neurotransmitter derived from the amino acid tryptophan. Serotonin is involved in regulating mood, sleep, appetite, and sexuality. The amines are transmitted locally or via the blood system. The exogenous amines are directly absorbed from food in the intestine. Alcohol can increase the absorption rate. Monoamine oxidase (MAO) breaks down biogenic amines and prevents excessive resorption. MAO inhibitors (MAOIs) are also used as medications for the treatment of depression to prevent MAO from breaking down amines important for positive mood.

== Importance in food ==
Biogenic amines can be found in all foods containing proteins or free amino acids and are found in a wide range of food products including fish products, meat products, dairy products, wine, beer, vegetables, fruits, nuts and chocolate. In non-fermented foods the presence of biogenic amines is mostly undesired and can be used as indication for microbial spoilage. In fermented foods, one can expect the presence of many kinds of microorganisms, some of them being capable of producing biogenic amines. Some lactic acid bacteria isolated from commercial bottled yoghurt have been shown to produce biogenic amines. They play an important role as source of nitrogen and precursor for the synthesis of hormones, alkaloids, nucleic acids, proteins, amines and food aroma components. However, food containing high amounts of biogenic amines may have toxicological effects.

=== Determination of biogenic amines in wines ===
Biogenic amines are naturally present in grapes or can occur during the vinification and aging processes, essentially due to the microorganism's activity. When present in wines in high amount, biogenic amines may cause not only organoleptic defects but also adverse effects in sensitive human individuals, namely due to the toxicity of histamine, tyramine and putrescine. Even though there are no legal limits for the concentration of biogenic amines in wines, some European countries only recommend maximum limits for histamine. In this sense, biogenic amines in wines have been widely studied. The determination of amines in wines is commonly achieved by liquid chromatography, using derivatization reagents in order to promote its separation and detection. In alternative, other promising methodologies have been developed using capillary electrophoresis or biosensors, revealing lower costs and faster results, without needing a derivatization step. It is still a challenge to develop faster and inexpensive techniques or methodologies to apply in the wine industry.

== See also ==
- Monoamine neurotransmitter
- Trace amine
