= Monoamine receptor =

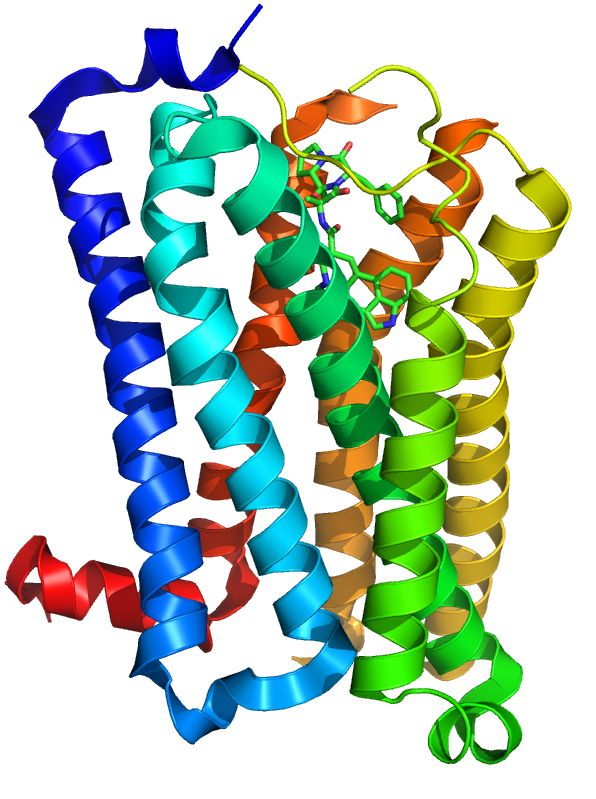
The serotonin 5-HT_{1B} receptor as an example of a monoamine receptor. Its crystallographic structure in ribbon representation.

A monoamine receptor is a receptor for the monoamine neurotransmitters and/or trace amines, endogenous small-molecule signaling molecules with a monoamine structure. The monoamine receptors are almost all G protein-coupled receptors, with the serotonin 5-HT_{3} receptor being a notable exception as a ligand-gated ion channel. Monoamine receptors are the biological targets of many drugs; such drugs may be referred to as "monoaminergic".

== List of receptors ==
Monoamine receptors include the following classes:

- Adrenergic receptors – bound by epinephrine (adrenaline) and norepinephrine (noradrenaline)
- Dopamine receptors – bound by dopamine
- Histamine receptors – bound by histamine
- Melatonin receptors – bound by melatonin
- Serotonin receptors – bound by serotonin (5-HT)
- Trace amine-associated receptors – bound by trace amines, thyronamines, monoamine neurotransmitters (TAAR1 only), and trimethylamine (TAAR5 only)
