= Taar (disambiguation) =

Taar or TAAR may refer to:

- Taar (instrument) or tar, a Persian long-necked, waisted stringed instrument shared by many cultures and countries in central Asia and near the Caucasus region
- Trace amine-associated receptor, a class of mammalian neurochemical receptors that are activated by trace amines
- The All-American Rejects, a musical band.
