= Monoamine neurotransmitter =

Monoamine that acts as a neurotransmitter or neuromodulator

Dopamine

Norepinephrine

Serotonin

Monoamine neurotransmitters are neurotransmitters and neuromodulators that contain one amino group connected to an aromatic ring by a two-carbon chain (such as -CH_{2}-CH_{2}-). Examples are dopamine, norepinephrine and serotonin.

All monoamines are derived from aromatic amino acids like phenylalanine, tyrosine, and tryptophan by the action of aromatic amino acid decarboxylase enzymes. They are deactivated in the body by the enzymes known as monoamine oxidases which clip off the amine group.

Monoaminergic systems, i.e., the networks of neurons that use monoamine neurotransmitters, are involved in the regulation of processes such as emotion, arousal, and certain types of memory. It has also been found that monoamine neurotransmitters play an important role in the secretion and production of neurotrophin-3 by astrocytes, a chemical which maintains neuron integrity and provides neurons with trophic support.

Drugs used to increase or reduce the effect of monoamine neurotransmitters are used to treat patients with psychiatric and neurological disorders, including depression, anxiety, schizophrenia and Parkinson's disease.

== Examples ==
Biosynthetic pathways for catecholamines and trace amines in the human brain
Phenethylaminergic trace amines and the catecholamines are derivatives of L-phenylalanine.

Classical monoamines

- Imidazoleamines:
  - Histamine
- Catecholamines:
  - Adrenaline (Ad; Epinephrine, Epi)
  - Dopamine (DA)
  - Noradrenaline (NAd; Norepinephrine, NE)
- Indolamines:
  - Serotonin (5-HT)
  - Melatonin (MT)

Trace amines

- Phenethylamines (related to catecholamines):
  - Phenethylamine (PEA)
  - N-Methylphenethylamine (endogenous amphetamine isomer)
  - Phenylethanolamine
  - m-Tyramine
  - p-Tyramine
  - 3-Methoxytyramine
  - N-Methyltyramine
  - m-Octopamine
  - p-Octopamine
  - Synephrine
- Tryptamine

Specific transporter proteins called monoamine transporters that transport monoamines in or out of a cell exist. These are the dopamine transporter (DAT), serotonin transporter (SERT), and the norepinephrine transporter (NET) in the outer cell membrane and the vesicular monoamine transporter (VMAT1 and VMAT2) in the membrane of intracellular vesicles.

After release into the synaptic cleft, monoamine neurotransmitter action is ended by reuptake into the presynaptic terminal. There, they can be repackaged into synaptic vesicles or degraded by the enzyme monoamine oxidase (MAO), which is a target of monoamine oxidase inhibitors, a class of antidepressants.

== Evolution ==
A phylogenetic tree showing how a number of monoamine receptors are related to each other.

Monoamine neurotransmitter systems occur in virtually all vertebrates, where the evolvability of these systems has served to promote the adaptability of vertebrate species to different environments.

A recent computational investigation of genetic origins shows that the earliest development of monoamines occurred 650 million years ago and that the appearance of these chemicals, necessary for active or participatory awareness and engagement with the environment, coincides with the emergence of bilaterian or "mirror" body in the midst of (or perhaps in some sense catalytic of?) the Cambrian Explosion.

== See also ==
- Monoamine reuptake inhibitor
- Monoamine receptor
- Monoamine oxidase
- Monoamine transporter
- Monoamine Hypothesis
- Biogenic amine
- Trace amine
- Monoamine nuclei
- Biology of depression
