= DMEA =

DMEA may refer to:

- Dimethylethanolamine
- N,N-Dimethylethylamine
- 2,5-Dimethoxy-4-ethylamphetamine (also known as DOET)
