= TA5 =

TA5 may refer to:

- The Apprentice (U.S. season 5)
- TAAR8, GPCR receptor
