= Metaterol =

Chemical compound

Clinical data
- Other names: Isofenefrine; Isopropylnoradrianol; 3,β-Dihydroxy-N-isopropylphenethylamine
- ATC code: None

Identifiers
- IUPAC name: 3-[1-hydroxy-2-(propan-2-ylamino)ethyl]phenol
- CAS Number: 3571-71-9
- PubChem CID: 19136
- ChemSpider: 18056
- UNII: KBU4V9QUHY
- CompTox Dashboard (EPA): DTXSID10863209
- ECHA InfoCard: 100.020.617

Chemical and physical data
- Formula: C_{11}H_{17}NO_{2}
- Molar mass: 195.262 g·mol^{−1}
- 3D model (JSmol): Interactive image
- SMILES: OC(c1cc(O)ccc1)CNC(C)C

Metaterol (INN), also known as isofenefrine, isopropylnoradrianol, and 3,β-dihydroxy-N-isopropylphenethylamine, is a sympathomimetic and bronchodilator of the phenethylamine family that was never marketed. It is structurally related to norfenefrine, phenylephrine, and etilefrine.
