= Etilefrine =

Chemical compound

Clinical data
- Trade names: Effortil, many others
- Other names: Etilephrine; Ethylnorphenylephrine; Ethylphenephrine; Ethyladrianol; Etiladrianol; Aethyladrianol; M-I-36; 3,β-Dihydroxy-N-ethylphenethylamine; 3,β-Dihydroxy-N-ethyl-β-phenylethylamine
- AHFS/Drugs.com: International Drug Names
- Routes of administration: Oral, injection
- Drug class: Adrenergic receptor agonist; Sympathomimetic
- ATC code: C01CA01 (WHO)

Pharmacokinetic data
- Bioavailability: Oral: 50%
- Protein binding: 23% (8.5% to albumin)
- Metabolism: Conjugation (glucuronidation)
- Metabolites: • Conjugates • Hydroxymandelic acid (3%)
- Elimination half-life: 2.5 hours
- Excretion: Urine (80%; 7–28% unchanged, 44–73% as conjugates)

Identifiers
- IUPAC name: (RS)-3-[2-(ethylamino)-1-hydroxyethyl]phenol
- CAS Number: 709-55-7
- PubChem CID: 3306
- DrugBank: DB08985
- ChemSpider: 3190
- UNII: ZB6F8MY53V
- KEGG: D07931
- ChEMBL: ChEMBL86882
- CompTox Dashboard (EPA): DTXSID1023029
- ECHA InfoCard: 100.010.829

Chemical and physical data
- Formula: C_{10}H_{15}NO_{2}
- Molar mass: 181.235 g·mol^{−1}
- 3D model (JSmol): Interactive image
- Chirality: Racemic mixture
- SMILES: CCNCC(O)c1cc(O)ccc1
- InChI: InChI=1S/C10H15NO2/c1-2-11-7-10(13)8-4-3-5-9(12)6-8/h3-6,10-13H,2,7H2,1H3; Key:SQVIAVUSQAWMKL-UHFFFAOYSA-N

Etilefrine, sold under the brand name Effortil among others, is a sympathomimetic medication used as an antihypotensive agent to treat orthostatic hypotension. It is usually used by mouth, but is also available as an injectable.

Side effects of etilefrine include nausea, tremors, and palpitations, among others. Etilefrine is an agonist of the α- and β-adrenergic receptors. It is a substituted phenethylamine and is related to epinephrine, phenylephrine, and norfenefrine.

Etilefrine was first described and introduced for medical use by 1949.

== Medical uses ==
Etilefrine is used to treat orthostatic hypotension and as a nasal decongestant. It has also been used off-label to treat priapism.

== Side effects ==
Side effects of etilefrine include nausea, tremors, and palpitations, among others.

== Pharmacology ==
=== Pharmacodynamics ===
Etilefrine is an agonist of the α_{1}-adrenergic receptor. It is a vasoconstrictor and antihypotensive agent. It has also been described as a β_{1}-adrenergic receptor agonist with some agonistic actions at the α- and β_{2}-adrenergic receptors.

Intravenous infusion of this compound increases cardiac output, stroke volume, venous return, and blood pressure in humans and animals, suggesting stimulation of both α- and β-adrenergic receptors. However, in vitro studies indicate that etilefrine has a much higher affinity for β_{1} (cardiac) than for β_{2} adrenoreceptors.

Intravenous etilefrine increases the pulse rate, cardiac output, stroke volume, central venous pressure, and mean arterial pressure of healthy individuals. Peripheral vascular resistance falls during the infusion of 1 to 8 mg etilefrine but begins to rise at higher dosage. Marked falls in pulse rate, cardiac output, stroke volume, and peripheral blood flow, accompanied by rises in mean arterial pressure, occur when etilefrine is infused after administration of intravenous propranolol 2.5 mg. These findings indicate that etilefrine has both β_{1}- and α_{1}-adrenergic receptor actions in humans.

=== Pharmacokinetics ===
==== Absorption ====
Etilefrine is rapidly absorbed with oral administration. The oral bioavailability of etilefrine is approximately 50%. Peak concentrations of etilefrine occur after 30 minutes.

==== Distribution ====
The plasma protein binding of etilefrine is 23%. About 8.5% is bound to albumin.

Etilefrine is a peripherally selective drug.

==== Metabolism ====
Etilefrine is metabolized by conjugation, for instance glucuronidation, in the liver and gastrointestinal tract. There appears to be significant first-pass metabolism. About 3% is metabolized into hydroxymandelic acid.

==== Elimination ====
The elimination of etilefrine is dependent on route of administration. Regardless of route, about 80% is excreted in urine within 24 hours. With oral administration, 7% is eliminated unchanged in urine and 73% as conjugates. Conversely, with intravenous administration, 28% is eliminated unchanged in urine and 44% as conjugates.

== Chemistry ==
Etilefrine, also known as 3,β-dihydroxy-N-ethylphenethylamine, is a substituted phenethylamine derivative. It is an analogue of epinephrine (3,4,β-trihydroxy-N-methylphenethylamine), of phenylephrine ((R)-β,3-dihydroxy-N-methylphenethylamine), of metaterol (3,β-dihydroxy-N-isopropylphenethylamine), and of norfenefrine (3,β-dihydroxyphenethylamine), as well as of metaraminol ((1R,2S)-3,β-dihydroxy-α-methylphenethylamine).

Etilefrine pivalate (K-30052) is the 3-pivalyl ester of etilefrine. In contrast to etilefrine, etilefrine pivalate was never marketed.

== History ==
Etilefrine was first described and introduced for medical use by 1949.

== Society and culture ==
=== Names ===
Etilefrine is the generic name of the drug and its INN and BAN, while étiléfrine is its DCF and etilefrina is its DCIT. In the case of the hydrochloride salt, its generic name is etilefrine hydrochloride and this is its BANM and JAN. Synonyms of etilefrine include ethylnorphenylephrine, ethylphenephrine, etiladrianol, aethyladrianol, and M-I-36. Brand names of the drug include Effortil, Circupon, Apocretin, Palsamin, Kertasin, Pressoton, Effoless, and Sanlephrin.
