= TAAR3 =

Human pseudogene

TAAR3P

Identifiers
- Aliases: TAAR3P, GPR57, GPR58, TAAR2, TAAR3, trace amine associated receptor 3 (gene/pseudogene), trace amine associated receptor 3, pseudogene
- External IDs: GeneCards: TAAR3P

Gene location (Human)
Chr.	Chromosome 6 (human)
Band	6q23.2	Start	132,608,225 bp
Band	6q23.2	End	132,609,302 bp
Orthologs
Databases	NCBI: entry; OMA: entry
Species	Human	Mouse
Entrez	9288	n/a
Ensembl	ENSG00000179073	n/a
UniProt	n a	n/a
RefSeq (mRNA)	NM_014627	n/a
RefSeq (protein)	n/a	n/a
Location (UCSC)	Chr 6: 132.61 – 132.61 Mb	n/a
PubMed search		n/a
- Wikidata
View/Edit Human

Putative trace amine-associated receptor 3 (TAAR3) is a human pseudogene with the gene symbol TAAR3P. In other species such as mice, TAAR3 is a functional protein-coding gene that encodes a trace amine-associated receptor protein.

Isobutylamine is a known ligand of TAAR3 in mice associated with sexual behaviour in male mice.

Isopentylamine was identified as a ligand for murine TAAR3 eliciting aversive behavior.

== See also ==
- Trace amine-associated receptor
