= Ludwig Brieger =

German physician, pathologist, and chemist (1849–1919)

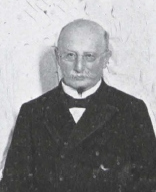
- Born: July 26, 1849; Kłodzko
- Died: October 18, 1919 (aged 70); Berlin, Germany
- Education: University of Strasbourg (D.M.)
- Occupations: medicine, pathology and chemistry

Ludwig Brieger (1849–1919, Glatze (now Klodzko, Poland)) was a German physician, pathologist, and chemist.

== Biography ==
Ludwig Brieger was born into a Jewish family in Glatz, then part of Prussian Silesia. After graduating from the gymnasium in Glatz, he studied at the University of Breslau and University of Stratsburg, where he graduated with the D.M. degree in 1875.

From 1879 to 1886 he worked at the Charité Clinic and became a professor in 1882.

From 1891 to 1900 he was head of the department of the Institute for Infectious Diseases, where he collaborated with Robert Koch.

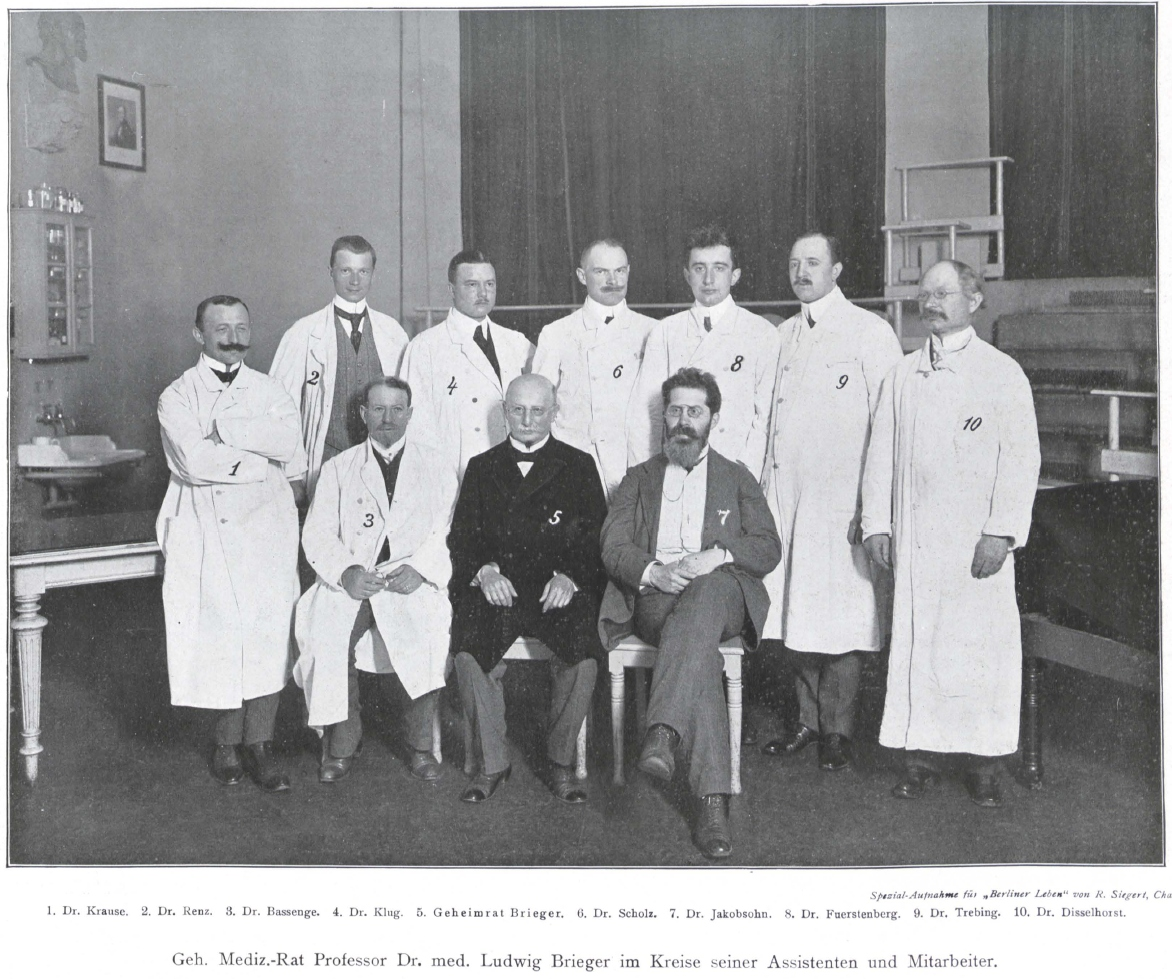
Ludwig Brieger among his assistants and collaborators, 1909.

From 1900 he worked as a professor of general internal medicine.

He investigated metabolic and infectious diseases and explored the basic nature of bacterial toxins. In the early 1880s he conducted research on cadaveric poisons. In 1885 he was the first to isolate 1,5-diaminopentane (cadaverine). In 1890 he introduced the term toxin in his study of the toxins of Salmonella Typhimurium (the causative agent of typhoid fever).

Ludwig Brieger is considered the discoverer of toxalbumin.

In the colonial zone, Brieger became known for his research on arrow poisons, snake poisons and plant poisons.
