= Monoamine nuclei =

Monoamine nuclei are clusters of cells that primarily use monoamine neurotransmitters to communicate. The raphe nuclei, ventral tegmental area, and locus coeruleus have been included in texts about monoamine nuclei. These nuclei receive a variety of inputs including from other monoamines, as well as from glutaminergic, GABAergic, and substance p related pathways. The catecholaminergic pathways mainly project upwards into the cortical and limbic regions, power sparse descending axons have been observed in animals models. Both ascending and descending serotonergic pathways project from the raphe nuclei. Raphe nuclei in the obscurus, pallid us, and magnus descend into the brainstem and spinal cord, while the raphe ponds, raphe dorsals, and nucleus centralism superior projected up into the medial forebrain bundle before branching off. Monoamine nuclei have been studied in relation to major depressive disorder, with some abnormalities observed, however MAO-B levels appear to be normal during depression in these regions.

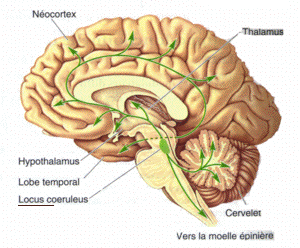
Locus-coeruleus

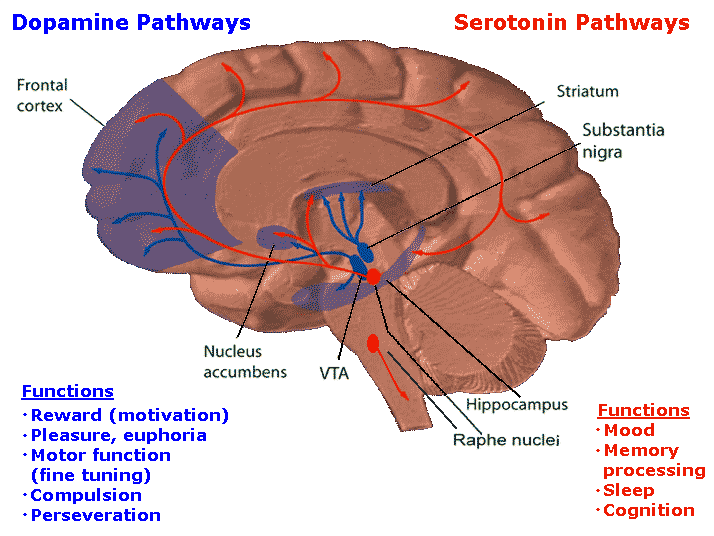
dopaminergic and serotonergic ascending pathways
