= 3,3',5-Triiodothyronamine =

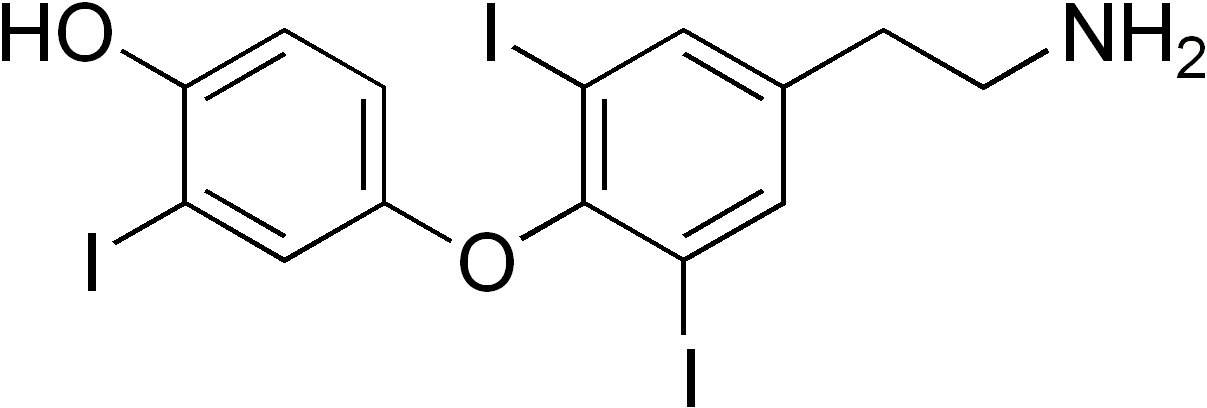

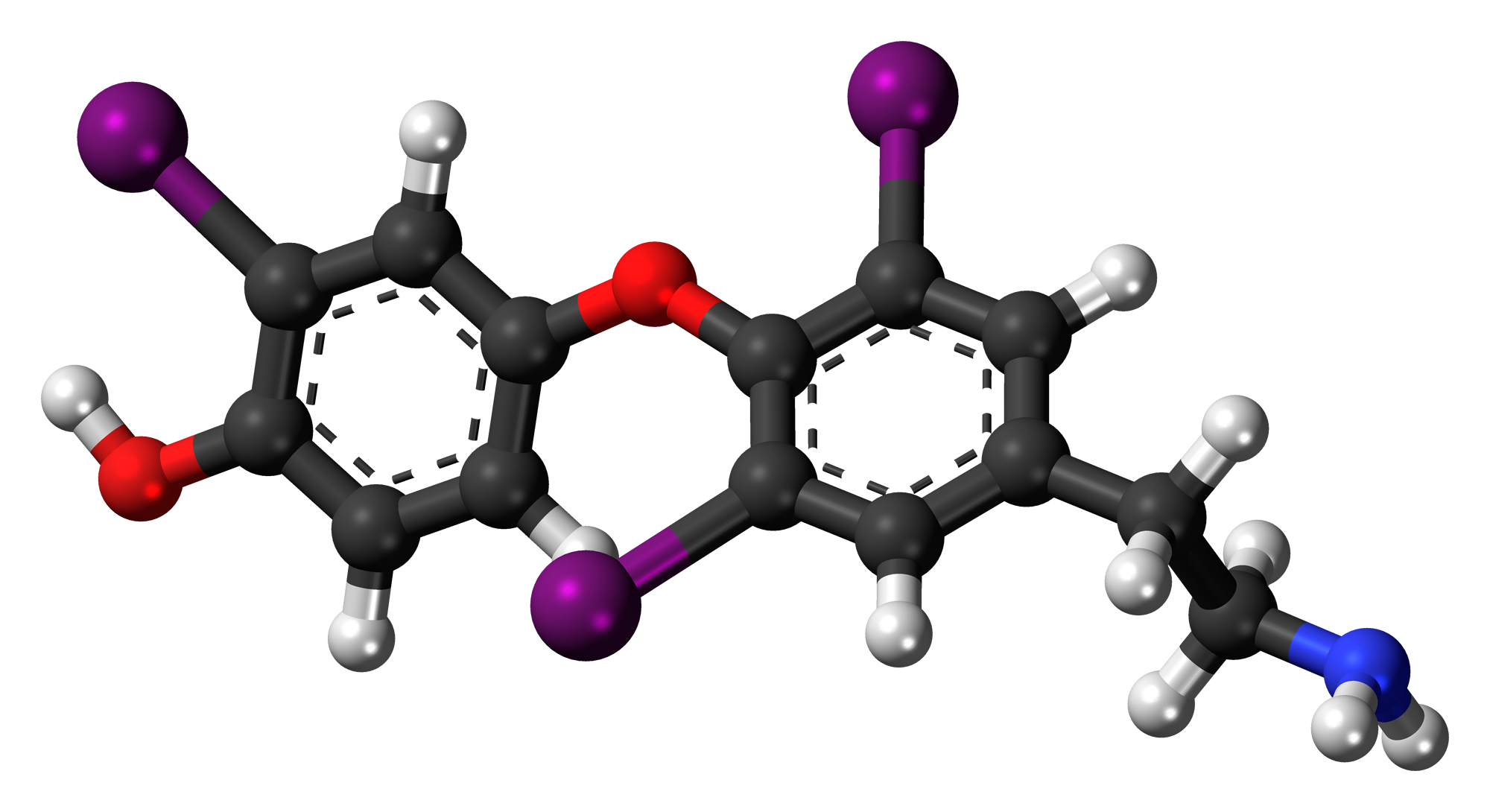

Names
- Preferred IUPAC name 4-[4-(2-Aminoethyl)-2,6-diiodophenoxy]-2-iodophenol
- Other names Triam

Identifiers
CAS Number	4731-88-8
3D model (JSmol)	Interactive image; Interactive image
ChEMBL	ChEMBL201885
ChemSpider	144879
PubChem CID	165262
UNII	JFU2LL83MX
CompTox Dashboard (EPA)	DTXSID40197100
- InChI: InChI=1S/C14H12I3NO2/c15-10-7-9(1-2-13(10)19)20-14-11(16)5-8(3-4-18)6-12(14)17/h1-2,5-7,19H,3-4,18H2 Key: KIXGKGGCXPSNDX-UHFFFAOYSA-N; InChI=1/C14H12I3NO2/c15-10-7-9(1-2-13(10)19)20-14-11(16)5-8(3-4-18)6-12(14)17/h1-2,5-7,19H,3-4,18H2 Key: KIXGKGGCXPSNDX-UHFFFAOYAV
- SMILES: C1=CC(=C(C=C1OC2=C(C=C(C=C2I)CCN)I)I)O; Ic2cc(Oc1c(I)cc(cc1I)CCN)ccc2O

Properties
Chemical formula	C_{14}H_{12}I_{3}NO_{2}
Molar mass	606.96 g/mol
- Except where otherwise noted, data are given for materials in their standard state (at 25 °C [77 °F], 100 kPa). verify (what is ?) Infobox references

3,3',5-Triiodothyronamine is a thyronamine.
