= Cadaverine =

Foul-smelling diamine compound

- Skeletal formula of cadaverine Skeletal formula

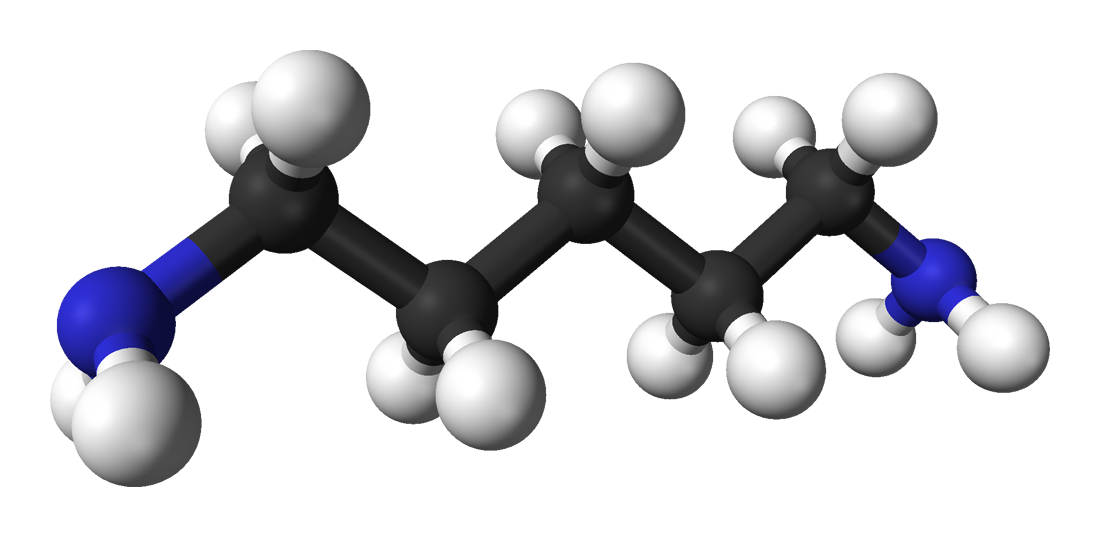
- Ball and stick model of cadaverine Ball-and-stick model

Names
- Preferred IUPAC name Pentane-1,5-diamine
- Other names 1,5-Diaminopentane, pentamethylenediamine

Identifiers
CAS Number	462-94-2
3D model (JSmol)	Interactive image
Beilstein Reference	1697256
ChEBI	CHEBI:18127
ChEMBL	ChEMBL119296
ChemSpider	13866593
DrugBank	DB03854
ECHA InfoCard	100.006.664
EC Number	207-329-0
Gmelin Reference	2310
KEGG	C01672
MeSH	Cadaverine
PubChem CID	273
RTECS number	SA0200000
UNII	L90BEN6OLL
UN number	2735
CompTox Dashboard (EPA)	DTXSID5075448
- InChI: InChI=1S/C5H14N2/c6-4-2-1-3-5-7/h1-7H2 Key: VHRGRCVQAFMJIZ-UHFFFAOYSA-N
- SMILES: NCCCCCN

Properties
Chemical formula	C_{5}H_{14}N_{2}
Molar mass	102.181 g·mol^{−1}
Appearance	Colourless liquid
Odor	very unpleasant; putrid
Density	873,0 g/l
Melting point	11.83 °C (53.29 °F; 284.98 K)
Boiling point	179.1 °C; 354.3 °F; 452.2 K
Solubility in water	Soluble
Solubility in other solvents	conventional organic solvents
log P	−0.123
Acidity (pK_{a})	10.25, 9.13
Refractive index (n_{D})	1.458

Hazards
- GHS labelling
Pictograms	(GHS05: Corrosive)
Signal word	Danger
Hazard statements	H314
Precautionary statements	P280, P305+P351+P338, P310
NFPA 704 (fire diamond)	3 2 0
Flash point	62 °C (144 °F; 335 K)
- Lethal dose or concentration (LD, LC)
LD_{50} (median dose)	2000 mg/kg (oral, rat)

Related compounds
Related alkanamines	n-Butylamine; Putrescine; Pentylamine; Hexamethylenediamine
- Except where otherwise noted, data are given for materials in their standard state (at 25 °C [77 °F], 100 kPa). verify (what is ?) Infobox references

Cadaverine is an organic compound with the formula (CH_{2})_{5}(NH_{2})_{2}. Classified as a diamine, it is a colorless liquid with an unpleasant odor. It is present in small quantities in living organisms but is often associated with the putrefaction of animal tissue. Together with putrescine, it is largely responsible for the foul odor of putrefying flesh, but also contributes to other unpleasant odors.

== Production ==
In biological systems, cadaverine is produced by decarboxylation of lysine, a process catalyzed by lysine decarboxylase. Synethetic methods include hydrogenation of glutaronitrile and amination of 1,5-dichloropentane.

== History ==
Putrescine and cadaverine were first described in 1885 by the Berlin physician Ludwig Brieger (1849–1919). It was named from the English adjective cadaverous.

== Receptors ==
In zebrafish, the trace amine-associated receptor 13c (or TAAR13c) has been identified as a high-affinity receptor for cadaverine. In humans, molecular modelling and docking experiments have shown that cadaverine fits into the binding pocket of the human TAAR6 and TAAR8.

== Clinical significance ==
Seminal plasma contains cadaverine. Elevated levels of cadaverine have been found in the urine of some patients with defects in lysine metabolism. The odor commonly associated with bacterial vaginosis has been linked to cadaverine and putrescine.

== Derivatives ==
- Pentolinium and pentamethonium.

== Toxicity ==
Acute oral toxicity of cadaverine is 2,000 mg/kg body weight; its no-observed-adverse-effect level is 2,000 ppm (180 mg/kg body weight/day).

== See also ==
- Skatole
