= Octopamine =

Trace amine

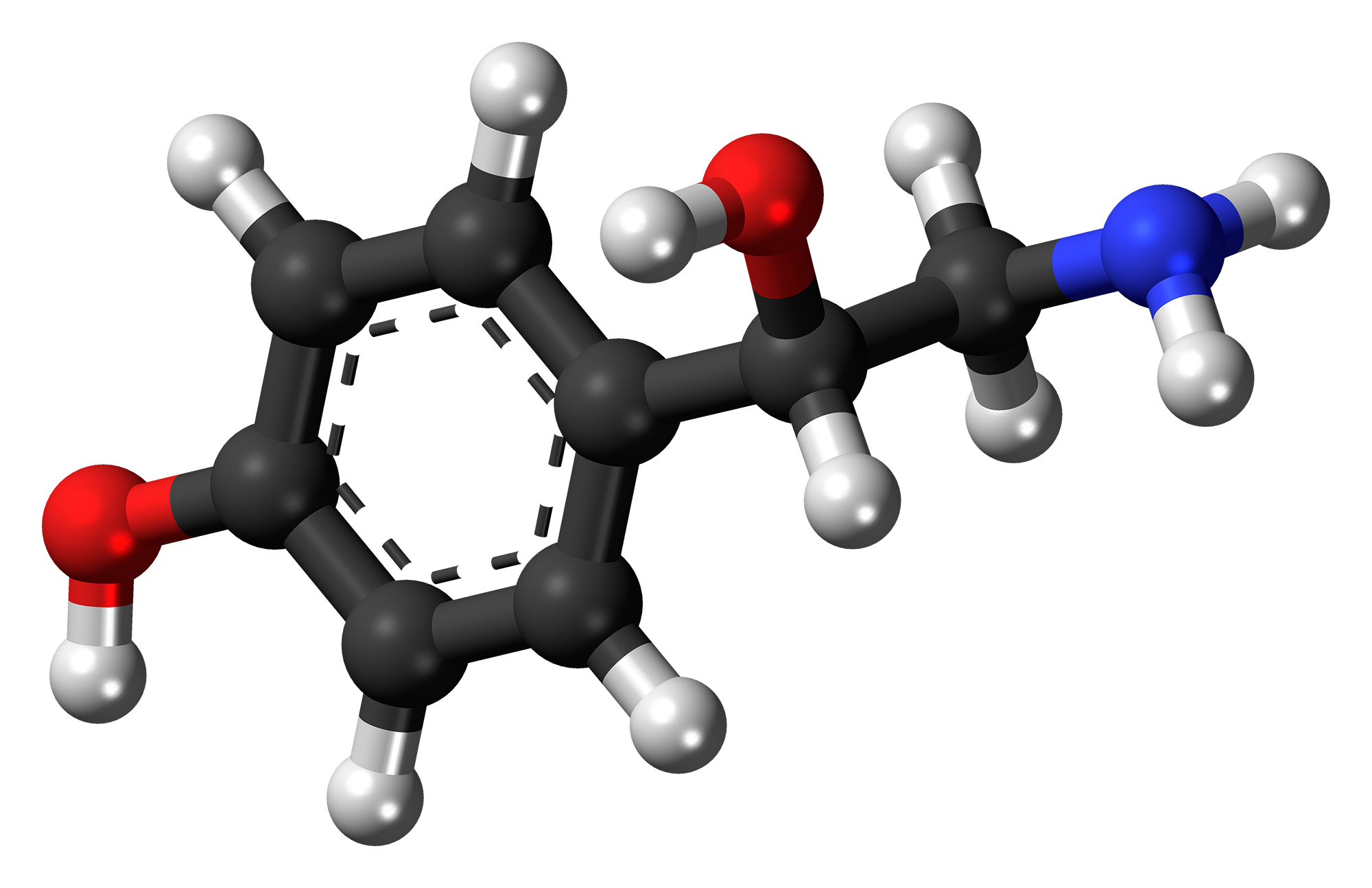

Clinical data
- Trade names: Epirenor, Norden, Norfen
- Other names: OCT, Norsympathol, Norsynephrine, para-Octopamine, beta-Hydroxytyramine, 4,β-dihydroxyphenethylamine, para-hydroxy-phenyl-ethanolamine, α-(Aminomethyl)-4 hydroxybenzenemethanol, 1-(p-Hydroxyphenyl)-2-aminoethanol
- Routes of administration: Oral
- ATC code: C01CA18 (WHO)

Physiological data
- Source tissues: Invertebrate nervous systems; trace amine in vertebrates
- Target tissues: System-wide in invertebrates
- Receptors: TAAR1 (mammals); OctαR, OctβR, TyrR (invertebrates), Oct-TyrR
- Agonists: Formamidines (amitraz (AMZ) and chlordimeform (CDM))
- Antagonists: Epinastine
- Precursor: Tyramine
- Biosynthesis: Tyramine β-hydroxylase; dopamine β-hydroxylase
- Metabolism: p-Hydroxymandelic acid; N-acetyltransferases; phenylethanolamine N-methyltransferase

Legal status
- Legal status: US: Prohibited from use in food or supplements.; Rx / Uncontrolled / Banned by World Anti-Doping Agency

Pharmacokinetic data
- Bioavailability: 99.42%
- Metabolism: p-Hydroxymandelic acid; N-acetyltransferases; phenylethanolamine N-methyltransferase
- Elimination half-life: 15 minutes in insects. Between 76 and 175 minutes in humans
- Excretion: Up to 93% of ingested octopamine is eliminated via the urinary route within 24 hours

Identifiers
- IUPAC name: (RS)-4-(2-amino-1-hydroxy-ethyl)phenol
- CAS Number: 104-14-3
- PubChem CID: 4581
- IUPHAR/BPS: 2149
- ChemSpider: 4420
- UNII: 14O50WS8JD
- KEGG: C04227
- ChEBI: CHEBI:17134
- ChEMBL: ChEMBL53929
- CompTox Dashboard (EPA): DTXSID7043873
- ECHA InfoCard: 100.002.890

Chemical and physical data
- Formula: C_{8}H_{11}NO_{2}
- Molar mass: 153.181 g·mol^{−1}
- 3D model (JSmol): Interactive image
- SMILES: OC(c1ccc(O)cc1)CN
- InChI: InChI=1S/C8H11NO2/c9-5-8(11)6-1-3-7(10)4-2-6/h1-4,8,10-11H,5,9H2; Key:QHGUCRYDKWKLMG-UHFFFAOYSA-N

Octopamine (OA), also known as para-octopamine and norsynephrine among synonyms, is an organic chemical closely related to norepinephrine, and synthesized biologically by a homologous pathway. Octopamine is often considered the major "fight-or-flight" neurohormone of invertebrates. Its name is derived from the fact that it was first identified in the salivary glands of the octopus.

In many types of invertebrates, octopamine is an important neurotransmitter and hormone. In protostomes—arthropods, molluscs, and several types of worms—it substitutes for norepinephrine and performs functions apparently similar to those of norepinephrine in mammals, functions that have been described as mobilizing the body and nervous system for action. In mammals, octopamine is found only in trace amounts (i.e., it is a trace amine), and no biological function has been solidly established for it. It is also found naturally in numerous plants, including bitter orange.

Octopamine has been sold under trade names such as Epirenor, Norden, and Norfen for use as a sympathomimetic drug, available by prescription.

== Functions ==
=== Cellular effects ===
Octopamine exerts its effects by binding to and activating receptors located on the surface of cells. These receptors have mainly been studied in insects, where they can be divided into distinct types:

1. OctαR (alpha-adrenergic-like), are structurally and functionally similar to noradrenergic alpha-1 receptors in mammals. There are multiple subtypes of the OctαR receptor. For example, the kissing bug (Rhodnius prolixus) has Octα_{1}-R, Octα_{2}R.
2. OctβR (beta-adrenergic-like), are structurally and functionally similar to noradrenergic beta receptors in mammals. There are multiple subtypes of the OctβR receptor. For example, the fruit fly (Drosophila melanogaster) has DmOctβ1R, DmOctβ2R, and DmOctβ3R.
3. OAMB. The diversity of this receptor is relatively unknown. The fruit fly (Drosophila melanogaster) has two distinct isoforms which are functionally distinct: Oamb^{K3} and Oamb^{AS}.
4. TyrR (mixed octopamine/tyramine receptors), which are structurally and functionally similar to noradrenergic alpha-2 receptors in mammals. Receptors in the TyrR class, however, are generally more strongly activated by tyramine than by octopamine.

Phylogenetic studies claim that in ancient bilaterians such as Platynereis dumerilii there is a co-existence of norepinephrine, tyramine and octopamine receptor signaling. However, due to partial overlapping in their signalling functionality tyramine and octopamine receptors have been lost in vertebrates.

In vertebrates no octopamine-specific receptors have been identified. Octopamine binds weakly to receptors for norepinephrine and epinephrine, but it is not clear whether this has any functional significance. It binds more strongly to trace amine-associated receptors (TAARs), especially TAAR1.

=== Invertebrates ===
Octopamine was first discovered by Italian scientist Vittorio Erspamer in 1948 in the salivary glands of the octopus and has since been found to act as a neurotransmitter, neurohormone and neuromodulator in invertebrates. Although Erspamer discovered its natural occurrence and named it, octopamine had actually existed for many years as a pharmaceutical product. It is widely used in energy-demanding behaviors by all insects, crustaceans (crabs, lobsters, crayfish), and spiders. Such behaviors include modulating muscle tension, flying, ovulation and egg-laying, and jumping.

==== In non-insect invertebrates ====
In lobsters, octopamine seems to direct and coordinate neurohormones to some extent in the central nervous system, and it was observed that injecting octopamine into a lobster and crayfish resulted in limb and abdomen extension.

In the nematode, octopamine is found in high concentrations in adults, decreasing egg-laying and pharyngeal pumping behaviors with an antagonistic effect to serotonin.

Octopaminergic nerves in the mollusc may be present in the heart, with high concentrations in the nervous system.

==== In non-Drosophila insects ====
In insects, octopamine is released by a select number of neurons, but acts broadly throughout the central brain, on all sense organs, and on several non-neuronal tissues. In the thoracic ganglia, octopamine is primarily released by DUM (dorsal unpaired median) and VUM (ventral unpaired median) neurons, which release octopamine onto neural, muscular, and peripheral targets. These neurons are important for mediating energy-demanding motor behaviors, such as escape-induced jumping and flight. For example, the locust DUMeti neuron releases octopamine onto the extensor tibia muscle to increase muscle tension and increase relaxation rate. These actions promote efficient leg muscle contraction for jumping. During flight, DUM neurons are also active and release octopamine throughout the body to synchronize energy metabolism, respiration, muscle activity and flight interneuron activity. Octopamine in locusts is four times more concentrated in the axon than in the soma, and decreases the locust's myogenic rhythm.

In the honey bee, octopamine has a major role in learning and memory. In the firefly, octopamine release leads to light production in the lantern.

In larvae of the oriental armyworm, octopamine is immunologically beneficial, increasing survival rates in high-density populations.

The emerald cockroach wasp stings the host for its larvae (a cockroach) in the head ganglion (brain). The venom blocks octopamine receptors and the cockroach fails to show normal escape responses, grooming itself excessively. It becomes docile and the wasp leads it to the wasp's den by pulling its antenna like a leash.

==== In Drosophila ====
Octopamine affects almost every process of the fruit fly and is widely present in both the adult and larval fly. A non-exhaustive list of some of the areas in which Octopamine modulates:

- Learning and memory
- Ovulation and Egg-Laying
- Locomotion
- Muscle Physiology
- Aggression
- Alcohol and drug tolerance
- Feeding
- Microbiome and gut physiology
- Sleep
- Modulating effects of exercise
- Metabolism

=== Vertebrates ===
In vertebrates, octopamine replaces norepinephrine in sympathetic neurons with chronic use of monoamine oxidase inhibitors. It may be responsible for the common side effect of orthostatic hypotension with these agents, though there is also evidence that it is actually mediated by increased levels of N-acetylserotonin.

One study noted that octopamine might be an important amine that influences the therapeutic effects of inhibitors such as monoamine oxidase inhibitors, especially because a large increase in octopamine levels was observed when animals were treated with this inhibitor. Octopamine was positively identified in the urine samples of mammals such as humans, rats, and rabbits treated with monoamine oxidase inhibitors. Very small amounts of octopamine were also found in certain animal tissues. It was observed that within a rabbit's body, the heart and kidney held the highest concentrations of octopamine. Octopamine was found to be 93% eluted by urine within 24 hours of being produced in the body as a byproduct of Iproniazid in rabbits.

== Pharmacology ==
Octopamine has been sold under trade names such as Epirenor, Norden, and Norfen for use in medicine as a sympathomimetic drug, available by prescription. However, very little information exists concerning its clinical usefulness or safety. It has been studied as an antihypotensive agent and has been shown to increase blood pressure when administered intravenously, intramuscularly, and buccally at sufficiently high doses, whereas oral administration was ineffective.

Octopamine is an analogue of sympathomimetic catecholamines like norepinephrine and phenethylamines like tyramine. However, octopamine has 400- to 2,000-fold lower affinity for the mammalian α- and β-adrenergic receptors than norepinephrine. In any case, it can produce significant sympathomimetic effects, like pressor responses, at sufficiently high doses.

In mammals, octopamine may mobilize the release of fat from adipocytes (fat cells), which has led to its promotion on the internet as a slimming aid. However, the released fat is likely to be promptly taken up into other cells, and there is no evidence that octopamine facilitates weight loss. Octopamine may also increase blood pressure significantly when combined with other stimulants, as in some weight loss supplements.

The World Anti-Doping Agency lists octopamine as a banned substance for in competition use, as a "specified stimulant" on the 2019 Prohibited List.

In contrast to various other phenethylamines, octopamine is a poor or negligible substrate of the dopamine transporter (DAT).

== Insecticides ==
The octopamine receptor is a target of insecticides, as its blockage leads to decreased cyclic adenosine monophosphate (cAMP) levels. Essential oils can have such a neuro-insecticidal effect, and this octopamine-receptor mechanism is naturally utilized by plants with active insecticidal phytochemicals.

== Biochemical mechanisms ==
=== Mammals ===
Octopamine is one of four primary endogenous agonists of human trace amine-associated receptor 1 (TAAR1) together with 3-iodothyronamine, dopamine and tyramine.

=== Invertebrates ===
Octopamine binds to its respective G-protein coupled receptors (GPCRs) to initiate a cell signal transduction pathway. At least three groups of octopamine GPCR have been defined. OctαR (OCTOPAMINE1 receptors) are more closely related to α-adrenergic receptors, while OctβR (OCTOPAMINE2 receptors) are more closely related to β-adrenergic receptors. The Octopamine/Tyramine receptors (including Oct-TyrR) can bind both ligands, and display agonist-specific coupling. Oct-TyrR is listed in both OCTOPAMINE and TYRAMINE RECEPTORS gene groups.

== Biosynthesis ==
Invertebrate synthesis of Octopamine

=== In insects ===
Octopamine acts as the insect equivalent of norepinephrine and has been implicated in regulating aggression in invertebrates, with different effects on different species. Studies have shown that reducing the neurotransmitter octopamine and preventing coding of tyramine β-hydroxylase (an enzyme that converts tyramine to octopamine) decreases aggression in Drosophila without influencing other behaviors.

== Chemistry ==
Octopamine, or para-octopamine, also known as 4,β-dihydroxyphenethylamine, is a substituted phenethylamine derivative. It is related to analogues including phenylethanolamine (β-hydroxyphenethylamine), tyramine (para-tyramine; 4-hydroxyphenethylamine), and norfenefrine (meta-octopamine; 3,β-dihydroxyphenethylamine), among others.
