= TAAR5 =

Protein-coding gene in the species Homo sapiens

Identifiers
- Aliases: TAAR5, PNR, trace amine associated receptor 5, taR-5
- External IDs: OMIM: 607405; MGI: 2685073; GeneCards: TAAR5

Gene location (Human)
Chr.	Chromosome 6 (human)
Band	6q23.2	Start	132,588,592 bp
Band	6q23.2	End	132,589,741 bp

Gene location (Mouse)
Chr.	Chromosome 10 (mouse)
Band	10|10 A4	Start	23,846,604 bp
Band	10|10 A4	End	23,847,617 bp
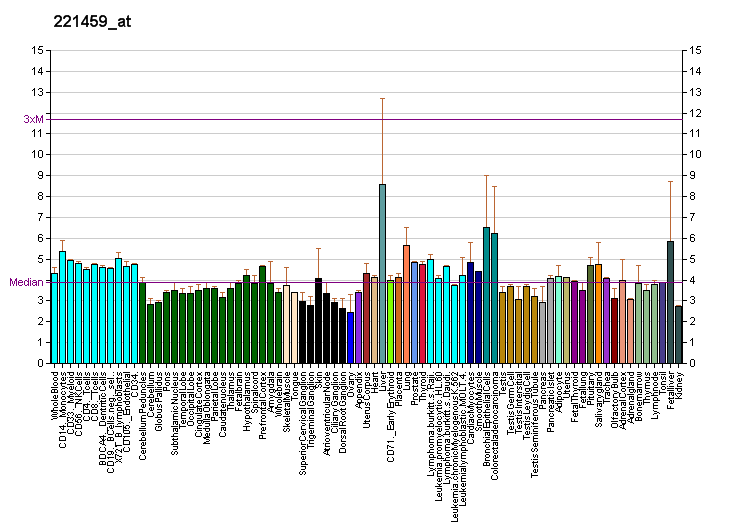
RNA expression pattern
Bgee	Human / Mouse (ortholog); Top expressed in: testicle / Top expressed in: membranous labyrinth; utricle; endolymphatic duct; nose; nasal septum; ganglion; Grüneberg ganglion; More reference expression data
BioGPS	More reference expression data
Gene ontology
Molecular function	trace-amine receptor activity; G protein-coupled receptor activity; trimethylamine receptor activity; signal transducer activity
Cellular component	plasma membrane; integral component of plasma membrane; membrane; integral component of membrane
Biological process	sensory perception of chemical stimulus; G protein-coupled receptor signaling pathway; signal transduction
Sources:Amigo / QuickGO
Orthologs
Databases	NCBI: entry; OMA: entry
Species	Human	Mouse
Entrez	9038	215854
Ensembl	ENSG00000135569	ENSMUSG00000069706
UniProt	O14804	Q5QD14
RefSeq (mRNA)	NM_003967; NM_001389527	NM_001009574
RefSeq (protein)	NP_003958	NP_001009574
Location (UCSC)	Chr 6: 132.59 – 132.59 Mb	Chr 10: 23.85 – 23.85 Mb
PubMed search
- Wikidata
View/Edit Human	View/Edit Mouse

Trace amine-associated receptor 5 is a protein that in humans is encoded by the TAAR5 gene. In vertebrates, TAAR5 is expressed in the olfactory epithelium.

Human TAAR5 (hTAAR5) is a functional trace amine-associated receptor which acts as an olfactory receptor for tertiary amines. Trimethylamine and N,N-dimethylethylamine are full agonists of hTAAR5. The amber-woody fragrance timberol antagonizes this activity of trimethylamine. 3-Iodothyronamine is an inverse agonist of hTAAR5. Recent studies highlighted the significant role of TAAR5 in the central nervous system and periphery. Beta-galactosidase mapping of TAAR5 expression showed its localization not only in the glomeruli but also in deeper layers of olfactory bulb projecting to the limbic brain olfactory circuitry. Moreover, TAAR5 knockout mice show increased adult neurogenesis and elevated number of dopamine neurons. Also, it was observed statistically significant changes in osmotic erythrocyte fragility in TAAR5-KO mice.

Mutations in the TAAR5 gene were found to affect human olfaction. Icelanders with a mutation in the gene were less likely to describe fish smell containing trimethylamine as unpleasant, and described licorice odor and cinnamon odor more intensely.

== See also ==
- Trace amine-associated receptor
