= TAAR6 =

Protein and coding gene in humans

Identifiers
- Aliases: TAAR6, TA4, TAR4, TAR6, TRAR4, taR-4, taR-6, trace amine associated receptor 6
- External IDs: OMIM: 608923; MGI: 2685074; GeneCards: TAAR6

Gene location (Human)
Chr.	Chromosome 6 (human)
Band	6q23.2	Start	132,570,322 bp
Band	6q23.2	End	132,571,359 bp

Gene location (Mouse)
Chr.	Chromosome 10 (mouse)
Band	10|10 A4	Start	23,860,507 bp
Band	10|10 A4	End	23,861,544 bp
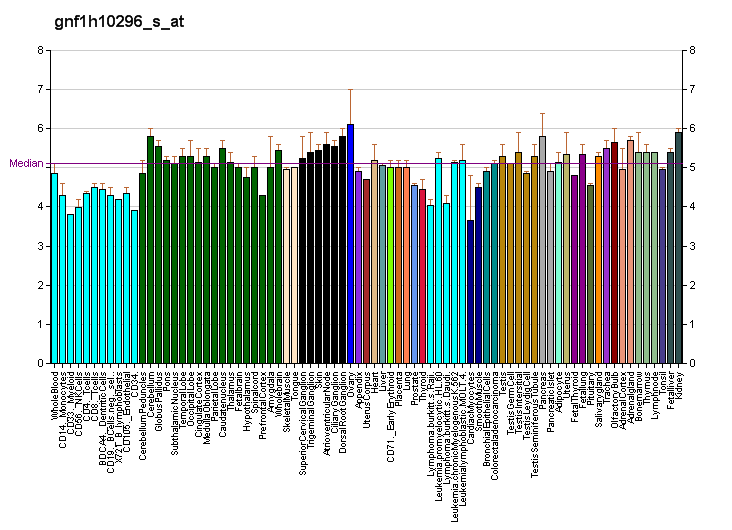
RNA expression pattern
Bgee	Human / Mouse (ortholog); Top expressed in: ganglionic eminence; renal cortex; blood; temporal lobe; amygdala; adrenal gland; human kidney / Top expressed in: Grüneberg ganglion; nasal septum; More reference expression data
BioGPS	More reference expression data
Gene ontology
Molecular function	trace-amine receptor activity; G protein-coupled receptor activity; signal transducer activity
Cellular component	plasma membrane; membrane; integral component of membrane
Biological process	G protein-coupled receptor signaling pathway; signal transduction
Sources:Amigo / QuickGO
Orthologs
Databases	NCBI: entry; OMA: entry
Species	Human	Mouse
Entrez	319100	215855
Ensembl	ENSG00000146383	ENSMUSG00000045111
UniProt	Q96RI8	Q5QD13
RefSeq (mRNA)	NM_175067	NM_001010828
RefSeq (protein)	NP_778237	NP_001010828
Location (UCSC)	Chr 6: 132.57 – 132.57 Mb	Chr 10: 23.86 – 23.86 Mb
PubMed search
- Wikidata
View/Edit Human	View/Edit Mouse

Trace amine associated receptor 6, also known as TAAR6, is a protein which in humans is encoded by the TAAR6 gene.

== Function ==
TAAR6 belongs to the trace amine-associated receptor family. Trace amines are endogenous amine compounds that are chemically similar to classic biogenic amines like dopamine, norepinephrine, serotonin, and histamine. Trace amines were thought to be 'false transmitters' that displace classic biogenic amines from their storage and act on transporters in a fashion similar to the amphetamines, but the identification of brain receptors specific to trace amines indicates that they also have effects of their own. RNA expression analysis shows hTAAR6 is expressed in the hippocampus, where murine TAAR receptors have been shown to be involved with neurogenesis.

Computational modeling suggests TAAR6 can bind to the foul smelling compounds produced by rotting flesh, putrescine and cadaverine.

TAAR6 mutant mice have differences in behavior compared with wild-type mice. Also, they have elevated brain serotonin levels in several brain regions and enhanced hypothermic response to 5-HT1A receptor agonist 8-OH-DPAT.
