= Trace amine-associated receptor =

Class of G protein-coupled receptors

Identifiers
- Symbol: ?
- InterPro: IPR009132
Available protein structures:
- PDB: IPR009132
- AlphaFold: IPR009132

Trace amine-associated receptors (TAARs), sometimes referred to as trace amine receptors (TAs or TARs), are a family of G protein-coupled receptors that were discovered in 2001. TAARs are mainly known for two functions, originally via studies of humans and mammals:

- TAAR2–TAAR9 work as olfactory receptors expressed by sensory neurons in the main olfactory epithelium, tuned to detect volatile amine odorants.
- TAAR1 primarily works as an intracellular receptor, detecting endogenous trace amines phenethylamine, tyramine, and tryptamine – metabolic derivatives of the amino acids phenylalanine, tyrosine and tryptophan, respectively – ephedrine, as well as the synthetic psychostimulants, amphetamine, methamphetamine and methylenedioxymethamphetamine (MDMA, ecstasy). Their localization in the central nervous system has garnered considerable interest in academic and proprietary pharmaceutical research. In 2004, it was shown that mammalian TAAR1 is also a receptor for thyronamines, decarboxylated and deiodinated relatives of thyroid hormones.

TAARs form a sister clade to a family of receptors not found in the aminotes but widely distributed in the other vertebrates called TAAR-like (TARL). TAAR and TARL are vertebrate inventions, originally arising via a duplication of the 5-HT4 receptor (htr4). The jawed fish adapted TAAR to the role of olfaction while the jawless fish independently adapted TARL into the same role. TAAR-TARL is only one of the four gene families commonly used for olfaction in vertebrates; in humans, most olfactory receptors belong to the OR family.

== Animal TAAR complement ==
=== Count ===
The following is a list of the number of TAARs contained in selected animal genomes:

- Tetrapods
  - Mammals
    - Human – 6 genes (TAAR1, TAAR2, TAAR5, TAAR6, TAAR8, TAAR9) and 3 pseudogenes (TAAR3P, TAAR4P, TAAR7P)
    - Chimpanzee – 3 genes (1, 5, 6) and 6 pseudogenes (2–4P, 7–9P)
    - Mouse – 15 genes (1–6, 7a–b, 7d–f, 8a–c, 9) and 1 pseudogene (7cP)
    - Rat – 17 genes (1× 1–6 and 9; 7× 7, 3× 8) and 2 pseudogenes (2× 7P)
  - Amphibian: Pipid frog – 7 genes and 0 pseudogenes (TARL, TAAR1, 5× TAAR4)
- Ray-finned fish:
  - Zebrafish – 112 genes and 4 pseudogenes
  - Medaka – 25 genes and 1 pseudogenes
  - Stickleback – 25 genes and 1 pseudogenes

In most vertebrates, TAARs occur as a conserved gene cluster.

=== Classification ===
- - - class I
      - A1
      - - A2
        - - A3
          - A4
    - class II
      - B1
      - - B2
        - - B3
          - B4
  - TARL
- Non-OR GPCRs

Subclades of vertebrate TAARs, Policarpo Supp. Fig. 17–18.

Vertebrate TAARs are phylogenetically resolved into two classes, which can be further broken down into subclades. Tetrapods (amphibians, mammals, birds, lizards, etc.) have TAARs from three subclades: A3 (mammalian TAAR1), B1 (TAAR2–4), and B3 (TAAR5–9), in which only the class II TAARs play a role in olfaction. Fish taar12 is B1 and taar13 is B3.

The subclade B4 (formerly "class III") originated in the ray-finned fishes from a duplication of taar13 and subsequently expanded.

TARL is not an olfactory receptor in bony vertebrates. The zebrafish tarl1 gene is minimally expressed in the nose but highly expressed in the brain, indicating a TAAR1-like role.

Older literature use a more complicated, somewhat chaotic, classification. For example, due to narrower taxonomic sampling, the TARL of bony vertebrates were thought to form a separate clade from TARL called "class V". There are many such extra splits that need to be re-interpreted by comparing them against a modern tree.

== Human trace amine-associated receptors ==
Six human trace amine-associated receptors (hTAARs) – hTAAR1, hTAAR2, hTAAR5, hTAAR6, hTAAR8, and hTAAR9 – have been identified and partially characterized. The table below contains summary information from literature reviews, pharmacology databases, and supplementary primary research articles on the expression profiles, signal transduction mechanisms, ligands, and physiological functions of these receptors.

The pharmacology and molecular biology of human trace amine-associated receptors
TAAR subtype	Prior names	Signal transduction	Expression profile	Known or putative function in humans (Note: As of December 2017, the functions of hTAAR2, hTAAR5, hTAAR6, hTAAR8, and hTAAR9 in the CNS and peripheral tissues outside the olfactory epithelium have not been determined.)	Known ligands	Sources
hTAAR1	TA_{1} TAR1	G_{s}, G_{q}, GIRKs, β-arrestin 2	CNS: brain (widespread), spinal cord Periphery: pancreatic β-cells, stomach, duodenum, intestines, leukocytes, elsewhere (Note: hTAAR1 is the only TAAR subtype that is not expressed within the human olfactory epithelium. Hence, unlike all other human trace amine-associated receptors, hTAAR1 does not function as an olfactory receptor in humans.)	• CNS: modulation of monoamine/glutamate neurotransmission • CNS: regulation of cognitive processes & mood states • Periphery: leukocyte chemotaxis • Periphery: regulation of GI hormone release & blood glucose • Regulation of satiety & body weight	• Trace amines (e.g., tyramine, PEA, NMPEA) • Monoamine neurotransmitters (e.g., dopamine) • Amphetamine and some structural analogs	
hTAAR2 (Note: hTAAR2 is a non-functional receptor in 10–15% of Asians due to the occurrence of a single-nucleotide polymorphism involving a premature stop codon in the human TAAR2 gene.)	GPR58	G_{olf}, other G protein coupling unknown (Note: hTAAR2 has been found to be coexpressed with G_{α} proteins, however its exact signal transduction mechanisms have not yet been established.)	CNS: brain (restricted) (Note: hTAAR2 expression has been observed in the human cerebellum.); Periphery: olfactory epithelium, intestines, heart, testes, leukocytes	• Periphery: leukocyte chemotaxis • Olfaction: chemoreceptor for volatile odorants (Note: In humans and other animals, TAARs that are expressed in the olfactory epithelium function as olfactory receptors that detect volatile amine odorants, including certain pheromones; these TAARs putatively function as a class of pheromone receptors involved in the olfactive detection of social cues. A review of studies involving non-human animals indicated that TAARs in the olfactory epithelium can mediate attractive or aversive behavioral responses to an agonist. This review also noted that the behavioral response evoked by a TAAR can vary across species. For example, TAAR5 mediates attraction to trimethylamine in mice and aversion to trimethylamine in rats. In humans, hTAAR5 presumably mediates aversion to trimethylamine, which is known to act as an hTAAR5 agonist and to possess a foul, fishy odor that is aversive to humans; however, hTAAR5 is not the only olfactory receptor that is responsible for trimethylamine olfaction in humans. As of December 2015, hTAAR5-mediated trimethylamine aversion has not been examined in published research.)		
TAAR3	GPR57	N/A	N/A	Pseudogene in humans – N/A	N/A	
TAAR4	TA_{2}	N/A	N/A	Pseudogene in humans – N/A	N/A	
hTAAR5	PNR	G_{s}, G_{olf}, G_{q}, G_{12/13}	CNS: brain (restricted), spinal cord Periphery: olfactory epithelium, intestines, testes, leukocytes	• Olfaction: chemoreceptor for volatile & foul odorants	• Agonists: trimethylamine, N,N-DMEA • Inverse agonists: 3-iodothyronamine	
hTAAR6	TA_{4} TAR4	G_{olf}, other G protein coupling unknown	CNS: brain Periphery: olfactory epithelium, intestines, testes, leukocytes, kidneys	• Olfaction: chemoreceptor for volatile odorants	• Agonists: putrescine and cadaverine	
TAAR7	–	N/A	N/A	Pseudogene in humans – N/A	N/A	
hTAAR8	TA_{5} GPR102	G_{olf}, G_{i/o}	CNS: brain Periphery: olfactory epithelium, melanocytes, stomach, intestines, heart, testes, leukocytes, kidneys, lungs, muscle, spleen	• Olfaction: chemoreceptor for volatile odorants	• Agonists: putrescine and cadaverine	
hTAAR9 (Note: hTAAR9 is a functional receptor in most individuals, but a loss-of-function mutation – specifically, a polymorphic premature stop codon – in the human TAAR9 gene occurs in 10–30% of individuals.)	TA_{3} TAR3	G_{olf}, other G protein coupling unknown	CNS: spinal cord Periphery: olfactory epithelium, intestines, leukocytes, pituitary gland, skeletal muscle, spleen	• Olfaction: chemoreceptor for volatile odorants	• Agonist: N-Methyl piperidine (CAS: 626-67-5)	

=== Disease links and clinical significance ===
Ulotaront / SEP 363856 is a TAAR1 agonist in phase 3 clinical trials for schizophrenia and earlier trials for Parkinson's Disease psychosis. The medicine has obtained Breakthrough designation from the US FDA.

== See also ==
- Olfactory receptor
- Odorant
- Pheromone
- Pheromone receptor
- Psychostimulant
- Thyronamine
- Trace amine
