= 3-Iodothyronamine =

Trace amine

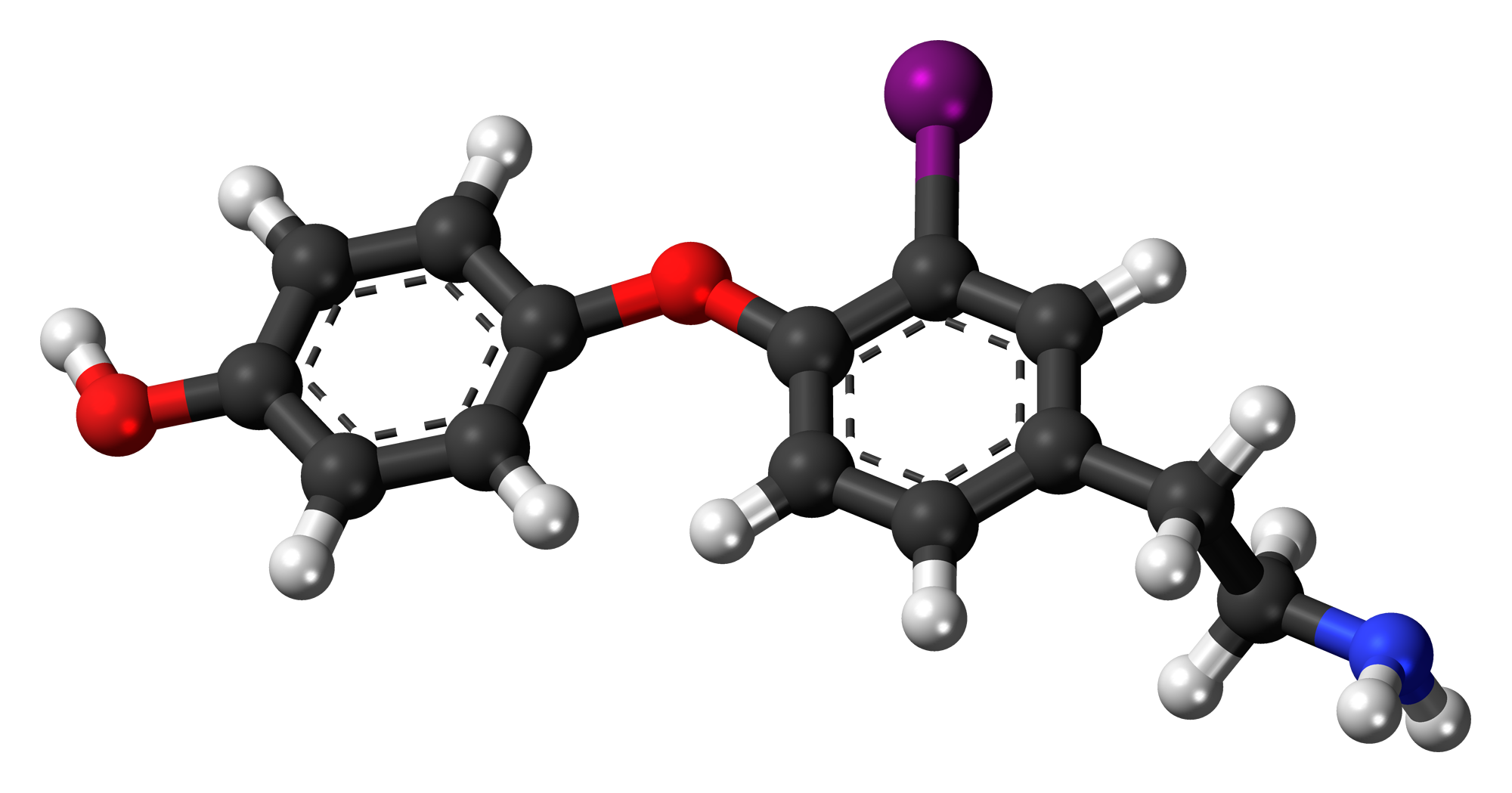

Names
- Preferred IUPAC name 4-[4-(2-Aminoethyl)-2-iodophenoxy]phenol
- Other names T_{1}AM; o-(4-Hydroxyphenyl)-3-iodotyramine; 4′-Hydroxy-o-PIT

Identifiers
CAS Number	712349-95-6
3D model (JSmol)	Interactive image; Interactive image
ChemSpider	8126125
ECHA InfoCard	100.211.501
PubChem CID	9950514
UNII	VMM45J7F4L
CompTox Dashboard (EPA)	DTXSID80433256
- InChI: InChI=1S/C14H14INO2/c15-13-9-10(7-8-16)1-6-14(13)18-12-4-2-11(17)3-5-12/h1-6,9,17H,7-8,16H2 Key: XIINYOJWNGOUPF-UHFFFAOYSA-N; InChI=1/C14H14INO2/c15-13-9-10(7-8-16)1-6-14(13)18-12-4-2-11(17)3-5-12/h1-6,9,17H,7-8,16H2 Key: XIINYOJWNGOUPF-UHFFFAOYAJ
- SMILES: OC1=CC=C(OC2=C(I)C=C(CCN)C=C2)C=C1; Ic2cc(ccc2Oc1ccc(O)cc1)CCN

Properties
Chemical formula	C_{14}H_{14}INO_{2}
Molar mass	355.17 g/mol
- Except where otherwise noted, data are given for materials in their standard state (at 25 °C [77 °F], 100 kPa). verify (what is ?) Infobox references

3-Iodothyronamine (T_{1}AM) is an endogenous thyronamine. It is a high-affinity ligand of the trace amine-associated receptor 1 (TAAR1). T_{1}AM is the most potent endogenous TAAR1 agonist yet discovered. It is also an agonist of the TAAR2 and TAAR5 with similar potency as for the TAAR1 (all in the case of the human proteins). T_{1}AM is not a ligand of the thyroid hormone receptors. However, it is additionally a ligand of various monoamine and other receptors. For instance, it is a muscarinic acetylcholine receptor antagonist.

Activation of TAAR1 by T_{1}AM results in the production of large amounts of cyclic adenosine monophosphate (cAMP). This effect is coupled with decreased body temperature and cardiac output. Wu et al. have pointed out that this relationship is not typical of the endocrine system, indicating that TAAR1 activity may not be coupled to G proteins in some tissues, or that T_{1}AM may interact with other receptor subtypes. T_{1}AM may be part of a signaling pathway to modulate cardiac function, as the compound can induce negative inotropic effects and decrease cardiac output.

T_{1}AM has been found to produce TAAR1-dependent tyrosine hydroxylase (TH) phosphorylation in mouse dorsal striatum slices. This phosphorylation would be expected to promote the functional activity of TH. Accordingly, higher rates of L-DOPA accumulation were observed after administration of T_{1}AM in mice treated with a DOPA decarboxylase inhibitor. The preceding effects were absent with TAAR1 knockout mice or with the TAAR1 antagonist EPPTB. In addition, T_{1}AM-mediated TH phosphorylation appeared to be mediated by CaMKII and protein kinase A (PKA) signaling. T_{1}AM was also found to increase electrically evoked dopamine release in striatal slices, which was blunted in TAAR1 knockout mice and in mice treated with EPPTB, indicating partial mediation by the TAAR1. In contrast to T_{1}AM, the trace amines β-phenethylamine and tyramine reduced TH phosphorylation, which was independent of the TAAR1, and hence do not appear to augment TH functional activity.

T_{1}AM had no effect on locomotor activity in rodents at low doses but produced hypolocomotion at high doses.

== See also ==
- O-Phenyl-3-iodotyramine
