= TAAR9 =

Protein-coding gene in the species Homo sapiens

Identifiers
- Aliases: TAAR9, TA3, TAR3, TAR9, TRAR3, trace amine associated receptor 9 (gene/pseudogene), trace amine associated receptor 9
- External IDs: OMIM: 608282; MGI: 3527454; GeneCards: TAAR9

Gene location (Human)
Chr.	Chromosome 6 (human)
Band	6q23.2	Start	132,538,290 bp
Band	6q23.2	End	132,539,336 bp

Gene location (Mouse)
Chr.	Chromosome 10 (mouse)
Band	10|10 A4	Start	23,984,386 bp
Band	10|10 A4	End	23,985,432 bp
RNA expression pattern
Bgee	Human / Mouse (ortholog); Top expressed in: material anatomical entity / Top expressed in: embryo; primary oocyte; secondary oocyte; zygote; More reference expression data
BioGPS	n/a
Gene ontology
Molecular function	signal transducer activity; G protein-coupled receptor activity; trace-amine receptor activity
Cellular component	plasma membrane; membrane; integral component of membrane
Biological process	signal transduction; G protein-coupled receptor signaling pathway
Sources:Amigo / QuickGO
Orthologs
Databases	NCBI: entry; OMA: entry
Species	Human	Mouse
Entrez	134860	503558
Ensembl	ENSG00000237110	ENSMUSG00000037424
UniProt	Q96RI9	Q5QD04
RefSeq (mRNA)	NM_175057	NM_001010831
RefSeq (protein)	NP_778227	NP_001010831
Location (UCSC)	Chr 6: 132.54 – 132.54 Mb	Chr 10: 23.98 – 23.99 Mb
PubMed search
- Wikidata
View/Edit Human	View/Edit Mouse

Trace amine-associated receptor 9 is a protein that in humans is encoded by the TAAR9 gene.

TAAR9 is a member of a large family of rhodopsin G protein–coupled receptors (GPCRs, or GPRs). GPCRs contain 7 transmembrane domains and transduce extracellular signals through heterotrimeric G proteins.[supplied by OMIM] N-Methyl piperidine is a ligand of TAAR9 associated with aversive behavior in mice. N,N-dimethylcyclohexylamine is an additional binding agonist that also activaes TAAR7 variants.

Recent research has demonstrated that deletion of the TAAR9 gene in rats leads to significant changes in both the CNS and the periphery. In the central nervous system, knockout of this gene slightly increases hippocampal serotonin and alters grooming behavior. Peripherally, blood analysis revealed decreased levels of low-density lipoprotein cholesterol in the blood. Additionally, TAAR9 appears to play a significant role in maintaining microbiota homeostasis. In TAAR9-KO rats, the microbiome structure exhibited greater variability than in wild-type littermates.

== See also ==
- Trace amine-associated receptor
