= Indolamines =

Family of neurotransmitters

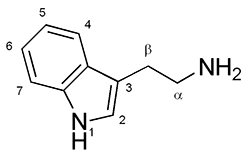
Tryptamine - otherwise known as indolamine.

Indolamines are a family of neurotransmitters that share a common molecular structure. Indolamines are a classification of monoamine neurotransmitter, along with catecholamines and ethylamine derivatives. A common example of an indolamine is the tryptophan derivative serotonin, a neurotransmitter involved in mood and sleep. Another example of an indolamine is melatonin.

In biochemistry, indolamines are substituted indole compounds that contain an amino group. Examples of indolamines include the lysergamides.

== Synthesis ==
The pathway for the synthesis of serotonin from tryptophan. Note that all compounds shown are indolamines.

Indolamines are biologically synthesized from the essential amino acid tryptophan. Tryptophan is synthesized into serotonin through the addition of a hydroxyl group by the enzyme tryptophan hydroxylase and the subsequent removal of the carboxyl group by the enzyme 5-HTP decarboxylase.

== See also ==
- Indole
- Tryptamine
