= TAAR2 =

Protein-coding gene in the species Homo sapiens

Identifiers
- Aliases: TAAR2, GPR58, taR-2, trace amine associated receptor 2, trace amine associated receptor 2 (gene/pseudogene)
- External IDs: OMIM: 604849; MGI: 2685071; GeneCards: TAAR2

Gene location (Human)
Chr.	Chromosome 6 (human)
Band	6q23.2	Start	132,617,022 bp
Band	6q23.2	End	132,624,275 bp

Gene location (Mouse)
Chr.	Chromosome 10 (mouse)
Band	10|10 A4	Start	23,814,470 bp
Band	10|10 A4	End	23,817,481 bp
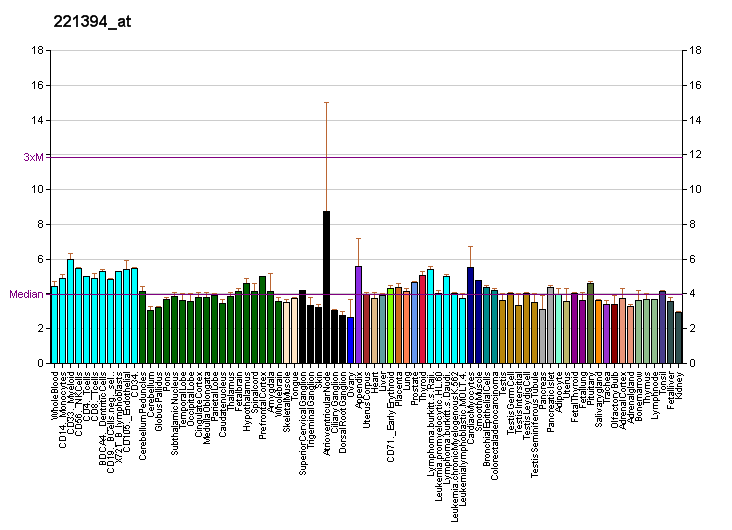
RNA expression pattern
Bgee	Human / Mouse (ortholog); Top expressed in: testicle; tibialis anterior muscle; gonad; deltoid muscle; lower lobe of lung; left testis; right testis / Top expressed in: embryo; morula; nose; nasal septum; ganglion; Grüneberg ganglion; stomach; More reference expression data
BioGPS	More reference expression data
Gene ontology
Molecular function	signal transducer activity; G protein-coupled receptor activity; trace-amine receptor activity
Cellular component	plasma membrane; membrane; integral component of membrane
Biological process	signal transduction; G protein-coupled receptor signaling pathway
Sources:Amigo / QuickGO
Orthologs
Databases	NCBI: entry; OMA: entry
Species	Human	Mouse
Entrez	9287	209512
Ensembl	ENSG00000146378	ENSMUSG00000059763
UniProt	Q9P1P5	Q5QD17
RefSeq (mRNA)	NM_001033080; NM_014626	NM_001007266
RefSeq (protein)	NP_001028252; NP_055441	NP_001007267
Location (UCSC)	Chr 6: 132.62 – 132.62 Mb	Chr 10: 23.81 – 23.82 Mb
PubMed search
- Wikidata
View/Edit Human	View/Edit Mouse

Trace amine-associated receptor 2 (TAAR2), formerly known as G protein-coupled receptor 58 (GPR58), is a protein that in humans is encoded by the TAAR2 gene. TAAR2 is co-expressed with G_{α} proteins; however, as of February 2017, its signal transduction mechanisms have not been determined.

== Tissue distribution ==
Human TAAR2 (hTAAR2) is expressed in the cerebellum, olfactory sensory neurons in the olfactory epithelium, and leukocytes (i.e., white blood cells), among other tissues. hTAAR1 and hTAAR2 are both required for white blood cell activation by trace amines in granulocytes.

Using brain histochemistry staining of mice with LacZ insertion into TAAR2 gene histochemical reaction was found in the glomerular layer of the olfactory bulb, but intensive staining was found in the deeper layer as well. The histochemical reaction was observed in the fibers of the olfactory nerve, in the glomeruli of the glomerular layer, several short axon (SA) cells (outer plexiform layer or granular layer) and neuronal projections that were visualized throughout the depth of the olfactory bulb. Furthermore, LacZ staining was observed in the limbic areas of the brain receiving olfactory input, i.e., piriform cortex molecular area, hippocampus (CA1 field, pyramidal layer), hypothalamic lateral zone (zone incerta) and lateral habenula. In addition, a histochemical reaction was found in the midbrain raphe nuclei and primary somatosensory area of the cortex (layer 5). Real-time quantitative PCR with reverse transcription confirmed TAAR2 gene expression in the mouse brain areas such as the frontal cortex, hypothalamus, and brainstem.

== Involvement in the functioning of monoamine systems ==
TAAR2 knockout mice have significantly higher level of dopamine in the striatum tissue than wild-type littermates and lower level of norepinephrine in hippocampus. Also, they have lower levels of MAO-B expression in midbrain and striatum. A significantly higher number of the dopamine neurons was detected in TAAR2-KO mice in the substantia nigra pars compacta. TAAR2 knockout mice have significantly higher level of horizontal activity and lower immobilization time in forced swim test.

== Involvement in adult neurogenesis ==
It has been found that TAAR2 knockout mice have an increased number of neuroblast-like and proliferating cells in both subventricular and subgranular zones of the dentate gyrus in comparison to wild type animals. Furthermore, TAAR2 knockout mice have an increased the brain-derived neurotrophic factor (BDNF) level in the striatum.

A single nucleotide polymorphism nonsense mutation of the TAAR2 gene is associated with schizophrenia. TAAR2 is a probable pseudogene in 10–15% of Asians as a result of a polymorphism that produces a premature stop codon at amino acid 168.

== Involvement in immune cell migration and function ==
TCells, B Cells and Peripheral Mononuclear cells express TAAR2 mRNA. Migration toward TAAR1 ligands required both TAAR1 and TAAR2 expression based on siRNA experiments. In T cells, the same stimuli triggered cytokine secretion while in B cells Immunoglobulin secretion is triggered.

== Possible Ligands ==
3‐Iodothyronamine (T1AM) was identified as a non-selective ligand for TAAR2. Additional TAAR1 ligands, tyramine and phenethylamine trigger TAAR2 dependant actions, though direct binding has not been demonstrated.

== See also ==
- Trace amine
- Trace amine-associated receptor
