= N,N-Dimethylethylamine =

Names
- Preferred IUPAC name N,N-Dimethylethanamine
- Other names Ethyl(dimethyl)amine

Identifiers
| CAS Number | 598-56-1 |
| 3D model (JSmol) | Interactive image |
| ChEMBL | ChEMBL609099 |
| ChemSpider | 11230 |
| ECHA InfoCard | 100.009.038 |
| EC Number | 209-940-8 |
| IUPHAR/BPS | 5523 |
| PubChem CID | 11723 |
| UNII | 9N5384XVEM |
| UN number | 2735 (DIMETHYLETHYLAMINE, [LIQUID]) |
| CompTox Dashboard (EPA) | DTXSID501036491 DTXSID4027232, DTXSID501036491 |
- InChI: InChI=1S/C4H11N/c1-4-5(2)3/h4H2,1-3H3 Key: DAZXVJBJRMWXJP-UHFFFAOYSA-N
- SMILES: CCN(C)C

Properties
| Chemical formula | C_{4}H_{11}N |
| Molar mass | 73.139 g·mol^{−1} |
| Appearance | Volatile liquid at room temp. |
| Density | 0.67±0.1 g/cm^{3} |
| Melting point | −140 °C (−220 °F; 133 K) |
| Boiling point | 36.5 °C (97.7 °F; 309.6 K) |
| Vapor pressure | 495.4±0.1 mmHg |
| Acidity (pK_{a}) | 10.16 (for the conjugate acid) (H_{2}O) |

Hazards
- GHS labelling
| Pictograms | (GHS02: Flammable) (GHS05: Corrosive) (GHS07: Exclamation mark) |
| Signal word | Danger |
| Hazard statements | H225, H302, H314, H332 |
| Precautionary statements | P210, P233, P240, P241, P242, P243, P260, P264, P270, P271, P280, P301+P317, P301+P330+P331, P302+P361+P354, P303+P361+P353, P304+P340, P305+P354+P338, P316, P317, P321, P330, P363, P370+P378, P403+P235, P405, P501 |
| Flash point | −12 °C; 10 °F; 261 K |
- Except where otherwise noted, data are given for materials in their standard state (at 25 °C [77 °F], 100 kPa). verify (what is ?) Infobox references

N,N-Dimethylethylamine (DMEA), sometimes referred to as dimethylethylamine, is an organic compound with formula (CH_{3})_{2}NC_{2}H_{5}. It is an industrial chemical that is mainly used in foundries as a catalyst for epoxy resins and polyurethane as well as sand core production. Dimethylethylamine is a malodorous, volatile liquid at room temperature that is excreted at greater concentrations with larger dietary intake of trimethylamine.

== See also ==
- Odorant
- Olfactory receptor
- Trace amine
- Trace amine-associated receptor
