= Norfenefrine =

Trace amine

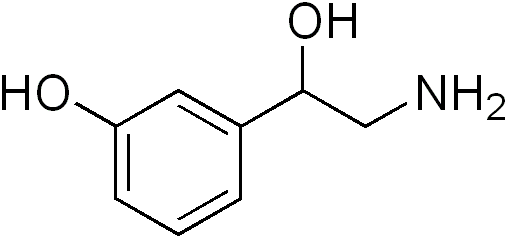

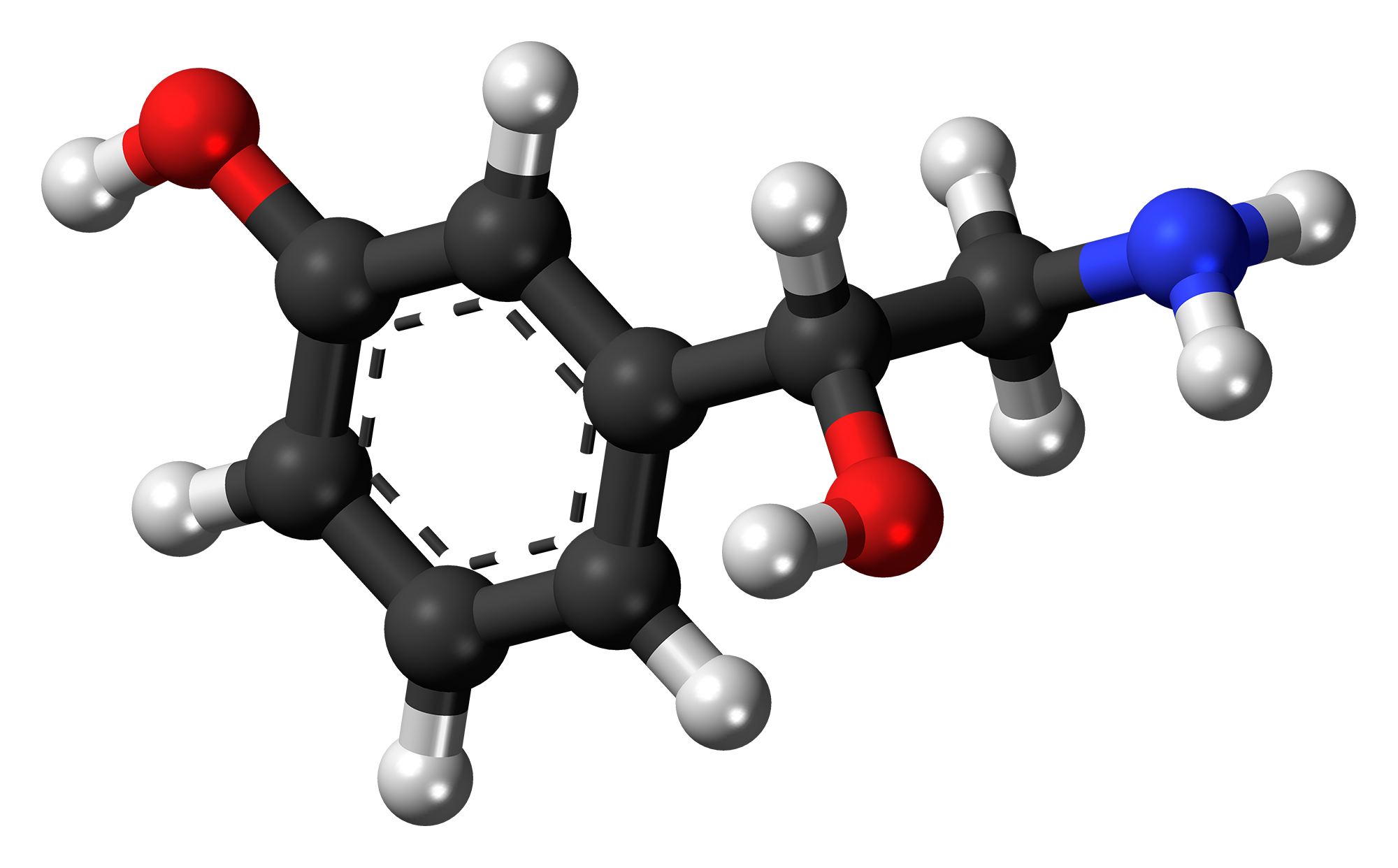

Clinical data
- Other names: Norfenephrine; Norphenephrine; Norphenylephrine; meta-Norsynephrine; meta-Octopamine; 3-Octopamine; Adrianol; 3,β-Dihydroxyphenethylamine; 3,β-Dihydroxy-β-phenylethylamine
- AHFS/Drugs.com: International Drug Names
- Drug class: Trace amine; alpha-1 adrenergic receptor agonist; sympathomimetic; antihypotensive
- ATC code: C01CA05 (WHO)

Legal status
- Legal status: In general: ℞ (Prescription only)

Pharmacokinetic data
- Metabolism: m-Hydroxymandelic acid

Identifiers
- IUPAC name: 3-(2-Amino-1-hydroxyethyl)phenol
- CAS Number: 536-21-0 15308-34-6 (hydrochloride)
- PubChem CID: 4538
- DrugBank: DB13378
- ChemSpider: 4379
- UNII: D2P3M6SRN5
- KEGG: D08286
- ChEBI: CHEBI:134779
- ChEMBL: ChEMBL358040
- CompTox Dashboard (EPA): DTXSID3048314
- ECHA InfoCard: 100.007.844

Chemical and physical data
- Formula: C_{8}H_{11}NO_{2}
- Molar mass: 153.181 g·mol^{−1}
- 3D model (JSmol): Interactive image
- SMILES: OC(c1cc(O)ccc1)CN
- InChI: InChI=1S/C8H11NO2/c9-5-8(11)6-2-1-3-7(10)4-6/h1-4,8,10-11H,5,9H2; Key:LRCXRAABFLIVAI-UHFFFAOYSA-N

Norfenefrine, also known as meta-octopamine or norphenylephrine and sold under the brand name Novadral among others, is a sympathomimetic medication which is used in the treatment of hypotension (low blood pressure). Along with its structural isomer p-octopamine and the tyramines, norfenefrine is a naturally occurring endogenous trace amine and plays a role as a minor neurotransmitter in the brain.

== Medical uses ==
Norfenefrine is used in the treatment of hypotension (low blood pressure). It is said to be similarly effective or less effective than midodrine.

== Pharmacology ==
=== Pharmacodynamics ===
Norfenefrine is described as an α-adrenergic receptor agonist and sympathomimetic agent. It is said to act predominantly as an α_{1}-adrenergic receptor agonist.

== Chemistry ==
Norfenefrine, also known as 3,β-dihydroxyphenethylamine, is a substituted phenethylamine derivative. It is an analogue of norepinephrine (3,4,β-trihydroxyphenethylamine), of meta-tyramine (3-hydroxyphenethylamine), of phenylephrine ((R)-β,3-dihydroxy-N-methylphenethylamine), of etilefrine (3,β-dihydroxy-N-ethylphenethylamine), and of metaterol (3,β-dihydroxy-N-isopropylphenethylamine), as well as of metaraminol ((1R,2S)-3,β-dihydroxy-α-methylphenethylamine).

Norfenefrine is used medically as the hydrochloride salt.

The predicted log P of norfenefrine is -0.28 to -0.95.

== Society and culture ==
=== Names ===
Norfenefrine is the generic name of the drug and its INN. Synonyms of norfenefrine include hydroxyphenylethanolamine, nor-phenylephrine, and m-norsynephrine, among others. Brand names of norfenefrine include Novadral, A.S. COR, Coritat, Energona, Hypolind, Norfenefrin Ziethen, and Norfenefrin-Ratiopharm, among others.

=== Availability ===
Norfenefrine is marketed in Europe, Japan, and Mexico.
