= Thyronamine =

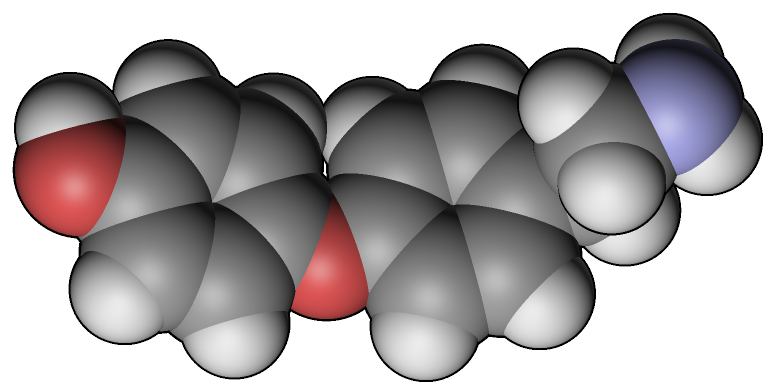

Names
- Preferred IUPAC name 4-[4-(2-Aminoethyl)phenoxy]phenol

Identifiers
CAS Number	500-78-7
3D model (JSmol)	Interactive image
ChEMBL	ChEMBL201896
ChemSpider	2340781
MeSH	thyronamine
PubChem CID	3083601
UNII	Q94DH269XB
CompTox Dashboard (EPA)	DTXSID60198174
- InChI: InChI=1S/C14H15NO2/c15-10-9-11-1-5-13(6-2-11)17-14-7-3-12(16)4-8-14/h1-8,16H,9-10,15H2 Key: OVUVNKDANCKDCK-UHFFFAOYSA-N; InChI=1/C14H15NO2/c15-10-9-11-1-5-13(6-2-11)17-14-7-3-12(16)4-8-14/h1-8,16H,9-10,15H2 Key: OVUVNKDANCKDCK-UHFFFAOYAP
- SMILES: O(c1ccc(cc1)CCN)c2ccc(O)cc2

Properties
Chemical formula	C_{14}H_{15}NO_{2}
Molar mass	229.279 g·mol^{−1}
- Except where otherwise noted, data are given for materials in their standard state (at 25 °C [77 °F], 100 kPa). verify (what is ?) Infobox references

Thyronamine is a type of decarboxylated and deiodinated metabolite of the thyroid hormones thyroxine (T4) and 3,5,3'-triiodothyronine (T3). The word thyronamine can refer to either the family of molecules, or the specific molecule from which they are derived.

== Types ==
The group includes:

- Thyronamine (T0AM)
- 3-Iodothyronamine (T1AM), which is the most notable one as it is a trace amine found in the nervous system. It is a possible candidate for the natural ligand of the trace amine-associated receptor TAAR1 (TAR1), an intracellular G protein-coupled receptor
- 3,5-Diiodothyronamine (T2AM)
- 3,5,3'-Triiodothyronamine (T3AM)

== See also ==
- Trace amines
- Thyroid hormone
