= TAAR8 =

Protein and coding gene in humans

Identifiers
- Aliases: TAAR8, GPR102, TA5, TAR5, TRAR5, TaR-5, TaR-8, trace amine associated receptor 8
- External IDs: OMIM: 606927; MGI: 2685995; GeneCards: TAAR8

Gene location (Human)
Chr.	Chromosome 6 (human)
Band	6q23.2	Start	132,552,693 bp
Band	6q23.2	End	132,553,721 bp

Gene location (Mouse)
Chr.	Chromosome 10 (mouse)
Band	10|10 A4	Start	23,967,158 bp
Band	10|10 A4	End	23,968,192 bp
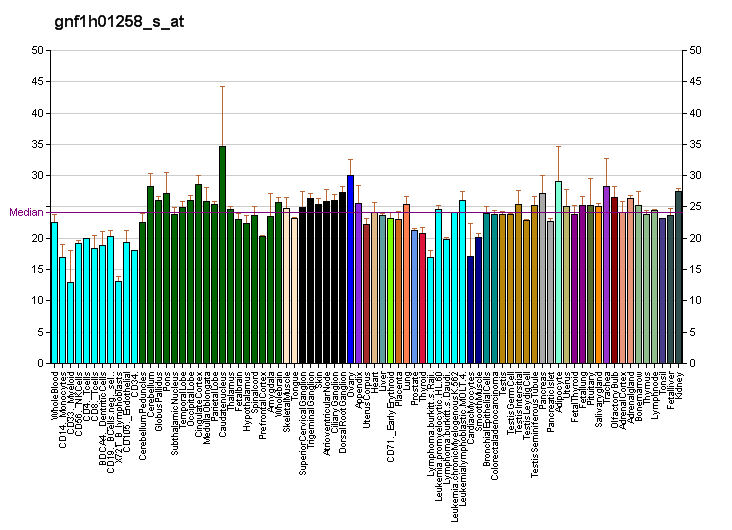
RNA expression pattern
Bgee	Human / Mouse (ortholog); Top expressed in: pancreas; female human reproductive system; organ system; material anatomical entity; kidney; renal cortex; vagina; islet of Langerhans; tibial nerve / n/a; More reference expression data
BioGPS	More reference expression data
Gene ontology
Molecular function	trace-amine receptor activity; G protein-coupled receptor activity; signal transducer activity
Cellular component	plasma membrane; membrane; integral component of membrane
Biological process	G protein-coupled receptor signaling pathway; signal transduction
Sources:Amigo / QuickGO
Orthologs
Databases	NCBI: entry; OMA: entry
Species	Human	Mouse
Entrez	83551	382348
Ensembl	ENSG00000146385	ENSMUSG00000100186
UniProt	Q969N4	Q5QD06
RefSeq (mRNA)	NM_053278	NM_001010837
RefSeq (protein)	NP_444508	NP_001010837
Location (UCSC)	Chr 6: 132.55 – 132.55 Mb	Chr 10: 23.97 – 23.97 Mb
PubMed search
- Wikidata
View/Edit Human	View/Edit Mouse

Trace amine-associated receptor 8 is a protein that in humans is encoded by the TAAR8 gene. In humans, TAAR8 is the only trace amine-associated receptor that is known to be G_{i/o}-coupled.

In humans, molecular modelling and docking experiments have shown that putrescine fits into the binding pocket of the human TAAR6 and TAAR8 receptors.

G protein-coupled receptors (GPCRs, or GPRs) contain 7 transmembrane domains and transduce extracellular signals through heterotrimeric G proteins, supplied by OMIM

== See also ==
- Trace amine-associated receptor
