= Trace amine =

Amino acid metabolites

- Drug class
- Phenethylamine skeleton

Class identifiers
- Mechanism of action: Receptor agonist
- Biological target: Human trace amine-associated receptor 1
- Chemical class: Endogenous amines with trace occurrence (nanograms or less per gram of brain tissue)

External links
- MeSH: C434723

Legal status

Trace amines are an endogenous group of trace amine-associated receptor 1 (TAAR1) agonists – and hence, monoaminergic neuromodulators – that are structurally and metabolically related to classical monoamine neurotransmitters. Compared to the classical monoamines, they are present in trace concentrations. They are distributed heterogeneously throughout the mammalian brain and peripheral nervous tissues and exhibit high rates of metabolism. Although they can be synthesized within parent monoamine neurotransmitter systems, there is evidence that suggests that some of them may comprise their own independent neurotransmitter systems.

Trace amines play significant roles in regulating the quantity of monoamine neurotransmitters in the synaptic cleft of monoamine neurons with co-localized TAAR1. They have well-characterized presynaptic amphetamine-like effects on these monoamine neurons via TAAR1 activation; specifically, by activating TAAR1 in neurons they promote the release (Note: Certain trace amines (e.g., phenethylamine) functionally inhibit the vesicular monoamine transporter VMAT2, while others do not (e.g., octopamine). The trace amines that do not inhibit VMAT2 function in monoamine neurons do not release neurotransmitters as effectively as those which do.) and prevent reuptake of monoamine neurotransmitters from the synaptic cleft as well as inhibit neuronal firing. Phenethylamine and amphetamine possess analogous pharmacodynamics in human dopamine neurons, as both compounds induce efflux from vesicular monoamine transporter 2 (VMAT2) and activate TAAR1 with comparable efficacy.

Like dopamine, norepinephrine, and serotonin, the trace amines have been implicated in a vast array of human disorders of affect and cognition, such as ADHD, depression, and schizophrenia, among others. Trace aminergic hypo-function is particularly relevant to ADHD, since urinary and plasma phenethylamine concentrations are significantly lower in individuals with ADHD relative to controls and the two most commonly prescribed drugs for ADHD, amphetamine and methylphenidate, increase phenethylamine biosynthesis in treatment-responsive individuals with ADHD. A systematic review of ADHD biomarkers also indicated that urinary phenethylamine levels could be a diagnostic biomarker for ADHD.

== List of trace amines ==
Biosynthetic pathways for catecholamines and trace amines in the human brain
Phenethylaminergic trace amines (shown in yellow) and the catecholamines are derived from the amino acid L-phenylalanine.

The human trace amines include:

- Phenethylamines (related to catecholamines):
  - Phenethylamine (PEA)
  - N-Methylphenethylamine (endogenous amphetamine isomer)
  - Phenylethanolamine
  - m-Tyramine
  - p-Tyramine
  - 3-Methoxytyramine
  - N-Methyltyramine
  - m-Octopamine
  - p-Octopamine
  - Synephrine
- Thyronamine compounds:
  - 3-Iodothyronamine
- Tryptamine

While not trace amines themselves, the classical monoamines norepinephrine, serotonin, and histamine are all partial agonists at the human TAAR1 receptor; dopamine is a high-affinity agonist at human TAAR1. N-Methyltryptamine (NMT) and dimethyltryptamine (DMT) are endogenous amines in humans, however, their human TAAR1 binding has not been determined as of 2015.

== Concentrations ==
Trace amines are so-named because they are present in the nervous system at trace or very low concentrations. These concentrations are much lower than for classical monoamine neurotransmitters like serotonin, dopamine, and norepinephrine. However, the rapid metabolic turnover of trace amines, consequent to strong susceptibility to monoamine oxidases, is suggestive that they may be present as chemical synapses at much higher concentrations than predicted by steady-state measures.

== History ==
A thorough review of trace amine-associated receptors that discusses the historical evolution of this research particularly well is that of Grandy.

== See also ==
- Neurotransmitter
- Monoamine neurotransmitter
- Trace amine-associated receptor (TAAR)
