= Tryptophol =

- Chemical structure of tryptophol

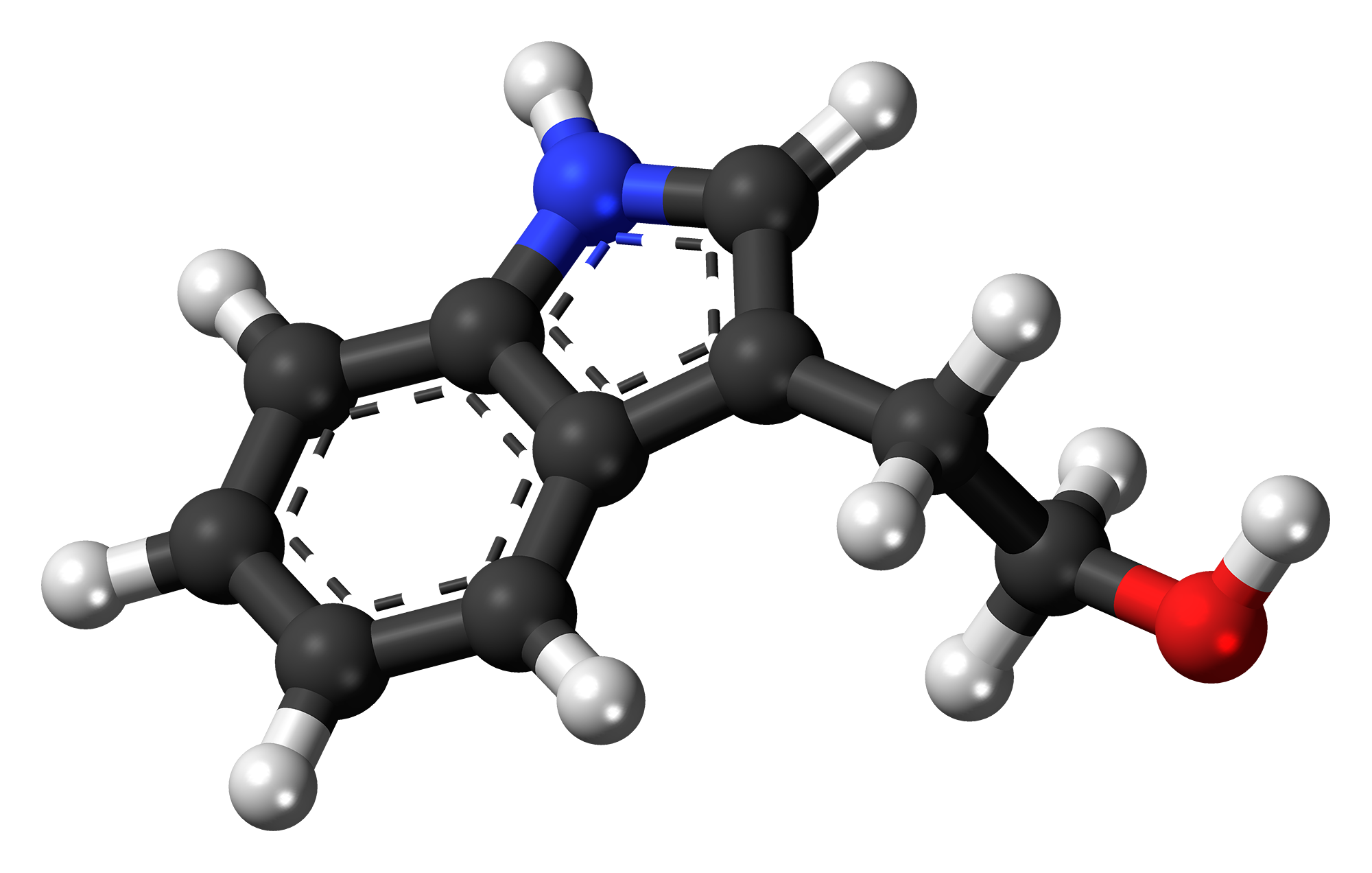
- Ball-and-stick model of the tryptophol molecule

Names
- Preferred IUPAC name 2-(1H-Indol-3-yl)ethan-1-ol
- Other names Indole-3-ethanol; 3-Indole ethyl alcohol (Indol-3-yl)ethanol; IEt; 2-Indolyl(3)-ethanol

Identifiers
CAS Number	526-55-6
3D model (JSmol)	Interactive image
ChEBI	CHEBI:17890
ChEMBL	ChEMBL226545
ChemSpider	10235
ECHA InfoCard	100.007.632
PubChem CID	10685
UNII	5809LZ7G1U
CompTox Dashboard (EPA)	DTXSID2060173
- InChI: InChI=1S/C10H11NO/c12-6-5-8-7-11-10-4-2-1-3-9(8)10/h1-4,7,11-12H,5-6H2 Key: MBBOMCVGYCRMEA-UHFFFAOYSA-N
- SMILES: C1=CC=C2C(=C1)C(=CN2)CCO

Properties
Chemical formula	C_{10}H_{11}NO
Molar mass	161.204 g·mol^{−1}
Melting point	59 °C (138 °F; 332 K)
- Except where otherwise noted, data are given for materials in their standard state (at 25 °C [77 °F], 100 kPa). Infobox references

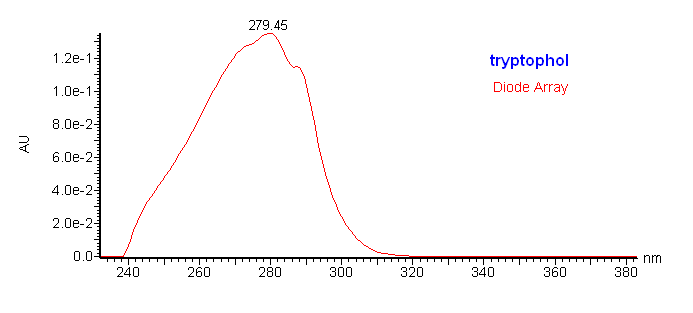
UV visible spectrum of tryptophol.

Tryptophol is an aromatic alcohol that induces sleep in humans. It is found in wine as a secondary product of ethanol fermentation. It was first described by Felix Ehrlich in 1912. It is also produced by the trypanosomal parasite in sleeping sickness.

It forms in the liver as a side-effect of disulfiram treatment.

== Natural occurrences ==
Tryptophol can be found in Pinus sylvestris needles or seeds. It is produced by the trypanosomal parasite (Trypanosoma brucei) in sleeping sickness (African trypanosomiasis). Tryptophol is found in wine and beer as a secondary product of ethanol fermentation (a product also known as congener) by Saccharomyces cerevisiae. It is also an autoantibiotic produced by the fungus Candida albicans. It can also be isolated from the marine sponge Ircinia spiculosa.

== Metabolism ==
=== Biosynthesis ===
It was first described by Felix Ehrlich in 1912. Ehrlich demonstrated that yeast attacks the natural amino acids essentially by splitting off carbon dioxide and replacing the amino group with hydroxyl. By this reaction, tryptophan gives rise to tryptophol. Tryptophan is first deaminated to 3-indolepyruvate. It is then decarboxylated to indole acetaldehyde by indolepyruvate decarboxylase. This latter compound is transformed to tryptophol by alcohol dehydrogenase.

It is formed from tryptophan, along with indole-3-acetic acid in rats infected by Trypanosoma brucei gambiense.

An efficient conversion of tryptophan to indole-3-acetic acid and/or tryptophol can be achieved by some species of fungi in the genus Rhizoctonia.

=== Biodegradation ===
In Cucumis sativus (cucumber), the enzymes indole-3-acetaldehyde reductase (NADH) and indole-3-acetaldehyde reductase (NADPH) use tryptophol to form (indol-3-yl)acetaldehyde.

=== Glycosides ===
The unicellular alga Euglena gracilis converts exogenous tryptophol to two major metabolites: tryptophol galactoside and an unknown compound (a tryptophol ester), and to minor amounts of indole-3-acetic acid, tryptophol acetate, and tryptophol glucoside.

== Biological effects ==
Tryptophol and its derivatives 5-hydroxytryptophol and 5-methoxytryptophol, induce sleep in mice. It induces a sleep-like state that lasts less than an hour at the 250 mg/kg dose. These compounds may play a role in physiological sleep mechanisms. It may be a functional analog of serotonin or melatonin, compounds involved in sleep regulation.

Tryptophol shows genotoxicity in vitro.

Tryptophol is a quorum sensing molecule for the yeast Saccharomyces cerevisiae. It is also found in the bloodstream of patients with chronic trypanosomiasis. For that reason, it may be a quorum sensing molecule for the trypanosome parasite.

In the case of trypanosome infection, tryptophol decreases the immune response of the host.

As it is formed in the liver after ethanol ingestion or disulfiram treatment, it is also associated with the study of alcoholism. Pyrazole and ethanol have been shown to inhibit the conversion of exogenous tryptophol to indole-3-acetic acid and to potentiate the sleep-inducing hypothermic effects of tryptophol in mice.

It is a growth promoter of cucumber hypocotyl segments. The auxinic action in terms of embryo formation is even better for tryptophol arabinoside on Cucurbita pepo hypocotyl fragments.

== See also ==
- Wine chemistry
