= Catecholaldehyde hypothesis =

Theory for what causes mental degenerative diseases

Chemical structure of DOPAL.

The catecholaldehyde hypothesis is a scientific theory positing that neurotoxic aldehyde metabolites of the catecholamine neurotransmitters dopamine and norepinephrine are responsible for neurodegenerative diseases involving loss of catecholaminergic neurons, for instance Parkinson's disease. The specific metabolites thought to be involved include 3,4-dihydroxyphenylacetaldehyde (DOPAL) and 3,4-dihydroxyphenylglycolaldehyde (DOPEGAL), which are formed from dopamine and norepinephrine by monoamine oxidase, respectively. These metabolites are subsequently inactivated and detoxified by aldehyde dehydrogenase (ALDH). DOPAL and DOPEGAL are monoaminergic neurotoxins in preclinical models and inhibition of and polymorphisms in ALDH are associated with Parkinson's disease. The catecholaldehyde hypothesis additionally posits that DOPAL oligomerizes with α-synuclein resulting in accumulation of oligomerized α-synuclein (i.e., synucleinopathy) and that this contributes to cytotoxicity.

== See also ==
- Amyloid hypothesis
