= Indole-3-acetaldehyde reductase (NADH) =

Enzyme

indole-3-acetaldehyde reductase (NADH)

Identifiers
- EC no.: 1.1.1.190
- CAS no.: 58875-06-2

Databases
- IntEnz: IntEnz view
- BRENDA: BRENDA entry
- ExPASy: NiceZyme view
- KEGG: KEGG entry
- MetaCyc: metabolic pathway
- PRIAM: profile
- PDB structures: RCSB PDB PDBe PDBsum
- Gene Ontology: AmiGO / QuickGO
Search
- PMC: articles
- PubMed: articles
- NCBI: proteins

In enzymology, indole-3-acetaldehyde reductase (NADH) (EC 1.1.1.190) is an enzyme that catalyzes the chemical reaction

tryptophol
+ NAD^{+}
H^{+}
H^{+}
indole-3-acetaldehyde
+ NADH

The two substrates of this enzyme are tryptophol and oxidised nicotinamide adenine dinucleotide (NAD^{+}). Its products are indole-3-acetaldehyde, reduced NADH, and a proton.

This enzyme belongs to the family of oxidoreductases, specifically those acting on the CH-OH group of donor with NAD^{+} or NADP^{+} as acceptor. The systematic name of this enzyme class is (indol-3-yl)ethanol:NAD^{+} oxidoreductase. Other names in common use include indoleacetaldehyde reductase, indole-3-acetaldehyde reductase (NADH), and indole-3-ethanol:NAD^{+} oxidoreductase. This enzyme participates in tryptophan metabolism.

== See also ==
- Indole-3-acetaldehyde reductase (NADPH) which catalyses the same reaction with the cofactor nicotinamide adenine dinucleotide phosphate
