= Indole-3-acetaldehyde reductase (NADPH) =

Class of enzymes

indole-3-acetaldehyde reductase (NADPH)

Identifiers
- EC no.: 1.1.1.191
- CAS no.: 58875-05-1

Databases
- IntEnz: IntEnz view
- BRENDA: BRENDA entry
- ExPASy: NiceZyme view
- KEGG: KEGG entry
- MetaCyc: metabolic pathway
- PRIAM: profile
- PDB structures: RCSB PDB PDBe PDBsum
- Gene Ontology: AmiGO / QuickGO
Search
- PMC: articles
- PubMed: articles
- NCBI: proteins

In enzymology, indole-3-acetaldehyde reductase (NADPH) (EC 1.1.1.191) is an enzyme that catalyzes the chemical reaction

tryptophol
+ NADP^{+}
H^{+}
H^{+}
indole-3-acetaldehyde
+ NADPH

The two substrates of this enzyme are [tryptophol and oxidised nicotinamide adenine dinucleotide phosphate (NADP^{+}). Its products are indole-3-acetaldehyde, reduced NADPH, and a proton.

This enzyme belongs to the family of oxidoreductases, specifically those acting on the CH-OH group of donor with NAD^{+} or NADP^{+} as acceptor. The systematic name of this enzyme class is (indol-3-yl)ethanol:NADP^{+} oxidoreductase. Other names in common use include indoleacetaldehyde (reduced nicotinamide adenine dinucleotide, phosphate) reductase, indole-3-acetaldehyde reductase (NADPH), and indole-3-ethanol:NADP^{+} oxidoreductase. This enzyme participates in tryptophan metabolism.

== See also ==
- Indole-3-acetaldehyde reductase (NADH) which catalyses the same reaction with the cofactor nicotinamide adenine dinucleotide
