= 3,4-Dihydroxyphenylglycolaldehyde =

Neurotransmitter metabolite and neurotoxin

Names
- Preferred IUPAC name (3,4-Dihydroxyphenyl)(hydroxy)acetaldehyde
- Other names DHMAL; 3,4-Dihydroxyphenylglycolaldehyde; 3,4-Dihydroxyphenylglycol aldehyde; DOPEGAL; DOPGAL; DHPGALD; Norepinephrine aldehyde; Epinephrine aldehyde; Noradrenaline aldehyde; Adrenaline aldehyde

Identifiers
CAS Number	13023-73-9
3D model (JSmol)	Interactive image
ChEBI	CHEBI:27852
ChemSpider	133725
KEGG	C05577
PubChem CID	151725
CompTox Dashboard (EPA)	DTXSID30897223
- InChI: InChI=1S/C8H8O4/c9-4-8(12)5-1-2-6(10)7(11)3-5/h1-4,8,10-12H Key: YUGMCLJIWGEKCK-UHFFFAOYSA-N
- SMILES: C1=CC(=C(C=C1C(C=O)O)O)O

Properties
Chemical formula	C_{8}H_{8}O_{4}
Molar mass	168.148 g·mol^{−1}
- Except where otherwise noted, data are given for materials in their standard state (at 25 °C [77 °F], 100 kPa). Infobox references

3,4-Dihydroxyphenylglycolaldehyde (also known as DOPEGAL, 3,4-dihydroxymandelaldehyde, DHMAL, norepinephrine aldehyde, or epinephrine aldehyde) is a metabolite of the monoamine neurotransmitters norepinephrine and epinephrine. DOPEGAL is a noradrenergic neurotoxin.

== Formation ==
DOPEGAL is formed by monoamine oxidase (MAO) via oxidative deamination. Following its formation, DOPEGAL is metabolized. Through the metabolism process, it is converted into 3,4-dihydroxymandelic acid (DHMA) via aldehyde dehydrogenase (ALDH), or into 3,4-dihydroxyphenylglycol (DHPG) via aldehyde reductase (ALR).

Formation of DOPEGAL (norepinephrine aldehyde) from norepinephrine.

== See also ==
- 3,4-Dihydroxyphenylacetaldehyde (DOPAL)
- 5-Hydroxyindoleacetaldehyde (5-HIAL)
