= Indole-3-acetaldehyde oxidase =

indole-3-acetaldehyde oxidase

Identifiers
- EC no.: 1.2.3.7
- CAS no.: 66082-22-2

Databases
- BRENDA: enzyme data
- ExPASy: NiceZyme view
- KEGG: enzyme entry
- MetaCyc: metabolic pathway
- Rhea: reactions
- PDB structures: RCSB PDB PDBe PDBsum
- Gene Ontology: AmiGO / QuickGO
Search
- PMC: articles
- PubMed: articles
- NCBI: proteins

In enzymology, indole-3-acetaldehyde oxidase (EC 1.2.3.7) is an enzyme that catalyzes the chemical reaction

indole-3-acetaldehyde
+ H_{2}O
O_{2}
H_{2}O_{2}
O_{2}
H_{2}O_{2}
indole-3-acetic acid

The three substrates of this enzyme are indole-3-acetaldehyde, water, and oxygen. Its products are indole-3-aceticacid and hydrogen peroxide.

This enzyme belongs to the family of oxidoreductases, specifically those acting on the aldehyde or oxo group of donor with oxygen as acceptor. The systematic name of this enzyme class is (indol-3-yl)acetaldehyde:oxygen oxidoreductase. Other names in common use include indoleacetaldehyde oxidase, IAAld oxidase, AO1, and indole-3-acetaldehyde:oxygen oxidoreductase. This enzyme participates in tryptophan metabolism. It has 3 cofactors: flavin adenine dinucleotide, heme, and molybdenum.
