= Indolepyruvate decarboxylase =

Class of enzymes

Identifiers
- EC no.: 4.1.1.74
- CAS no.: 9074-92-4

Databases
- BRENDA: enzyme data
- ExPASy: NiceZyme view
- KEGG: enzyme entry
- MetaCyc: metabolic pathway
- Rhea: reactions
- PDB structures: RCSB PDB PDBe PDBsum
- Gene Ontology: AmiGO / QuickGO
Search
- PMC: articles
- PubMed: articles
- NCBI: proteins

Indolepyruvate decarboxylase (EC 4.1.1.74) is an enzyme characterised from the soil bacterium, Enterobacter cloacae, that catalyzes the decarboxylation of indole-3-pyruvic acid to indole-3-acetaldehyde and carbon dioxide:

indole-3-pyruvic acid
CO_{2}
indole-3-acetaldehyde

The starting material is produced from the amino acid, tryptophan, by action of the enzyme L-tryptophan—pyruvate aminotransferase. The product of the reaction, which uses thiamine pyrophosphate as a cofactor, is converted to the main auxin plant hormone, indole-3-acetic acid. The enzyme has been suggested as a component of industrial synthesis of tryptophan derivatives.

This enzyme is a lyase, specifically a carboxy-lyase, which cleave carbon-carbon bonds. The systematic name of this enzyme class is 3-(indol-3-yl)pyruvate carboxy-lyase [(2-indol-3-yl)acetaldehyde-forming]. Other names in use include indol-3-yl-pyruvate carboxy-lyase, and 3-(indol-3-yl)pyruvate carboxy-lyase.

== Structural studies ==
As of late 2007, only one structure has been solved for this class of enzymes, with the PDB accession code PDB: 1OVM.
