= TAA1 =

TAA1 may refer to:

- L-tryptophan—pyruvate aminotransferase
- Toyota TAA-1
