= 5-Hydroxyindoleacetic acid =

Names
- Preferred IUPAC name (5-Hydroxy-1H-indol-3-yl)acetic acid

Identifiers
CAS Number	54-16-0
3D model (JSmol)	Interactive image
ChEBI	CHEBI:27823
ChEMBL	ChEMBL395915
ChemSpider	1760
ECHA InfoCard	100.000.179
KEGG	C05635
MeSH	Hydroxyindoleacetic+Acid
PubChem CID	1826
UNII	YHC763JY1P
CompTox Dashboard (EPA)	DTXSID50861582
- InChI: InChI=1S/C10H9NO3/c12-7-1-2-9-8(4-7)6(5-11-9)3-10(13)14/h1-2,4-5,11-12H,3H2,(H,13,14) Key: DUUGKQCEGZLZNO-UHFFFAOYSA-N; InChI=1/C10H9NO3/c12-7-1-2-9-8(4-7)6(5-11-9)3-10(13)14/h1-2,4-5,11-12H,3H2,(H,13,14) Key: DUUGKQCEGZLZNO-UHFFFAOYAY
- SMILES: c1cc2c(cc1O)c(c[nH]2)CC(=O)O

Properties
Chemical formula	C_{10}H_{9}NO_{3}
Molar mass	191.186 g·mol^{−1}
- Except where otherwise noted, data are given for materials in their standard state (at 25 °C [77 °F], 100 kPa). verify (what is ?) Infobox references

5-Hydroxyindoleacetic acid (5-HIAA) is the main metabolite of serotonin. The metabolic intermediate 5-hydroxyindoleacetaldehyde (5-HIAL) is formed from serotonin by monoamine oxidase (MAO) and then 5-HIAA is formed from 5-HIAL via aldehyde dehydrogenase (ALDH). In chemical analysis of urine samples, 5-HIAA is used to determine serotonin levels in the body.

== Clinical significance ==
5-HIAA is tested by 24-hour urine samples combined with an acidic additive to maintain pH below 3. Certain foods like pineapple, kiwi, banana, walnuts and drugs such as acetaminophen, nicotine or caffeine are known to interfere with the measurement. 5-HIAA levels can vary depending on other complications, including tumors, kidney malfunction, and small bowel resection.

Since 5-HIAA is a metabolite of serotonin, testing is most frequently performed for the diagnosis of carcinoid tumors of the enterochromaffin (Kultschitzsky) cells of the small intestine, which release large amounts of serotonin. Values greater than 25 mg per 24 hours (higher if the patient has malabsorption) are strong evidence for carcinoid. The normal range is 2 to 6 mg per 24 hours.

Low levels of 5-HIAA in the cerebrospinal fluid have been associated with aggressive behavior and suicide by violent means, correlating with diminished serotonin levels.

Elevated serotonin (hyperserotonemia) is one of the most common biological findings in autism and 5-HIAA may be elevated in patients with autistic spectrum disorders.

== Limitations ==
5-HIAA may be normal with nonmetastatic carcinoid tumor and may be normal even with the carcinoid syndrome, particularly in subjects without diarrhea, because some patients with the carcinoid syndrome excrete nonhydroxylated indolic acids.

1. Midgut carcinoids are most apt to produce carcinoid syndrome with 5-HIAA elevation. Patients with renal disease may have falsely low 5-HIAA levels in the urine.
2. 5-HIAA is increased in untreated patients with malabsorption, who have increased urinary tryptophan metabolites. Such patients include those with celiac disease, tropical sprue, Whipple disease, stasis syndrome, and cystic fibrosis. It is increased in those with chronic intestinal obstruction.
3. Poor correlation exists between 5-HIAA level and the clinical severity of the carcinoid syndrome. 3 recent studies confirm its use as a prognostic factor in this disease.
4. 5-HIAA is the major urinary metabolite of serotonin, a ubiquitous bioactive amine. Serotonin, and consequently 5-HIAA, are produced in excess by most carcinoid tumors, especially those producing the carcinoid syndrome of flushing, hepatomegaly (enlarged liver), diarrhea, bronchospasm, and heart disease. Quantitation of urinary 5-HIAA is the best test for carcinoid, but scrupulous care must be taken that specimen collection and patient preparation have been correct. Carcinoid tumors may cause increased excretion of tryptophan, 5-hydroxytryptophan and histamine as well as serotonin. Serum serotonin assay may detect some carcinoids missed by 5-HIAA assay.

The production and metabolism of serotonin, and thus 5-HIAA, is dependent upon the tissue of origin of the tumor. Tumors from midgut cells, such as ileal carcinoid usually contain and release large quantities of serotonin. These amounts may not be fully reflected in the amount of 5-HIAA in urine, because little is metabolized. Foregut tumors lack the decarboxylase enzyme necessary to convert 5-hydroxytryptophan to serotonin, resulting in minimal to no elevation in urinary 5-HIAA levels. Tumors derived from hindgut cells (rectal carcinoid) rarely produce excess serotonin or 5-HIAA. Of 75 patients with carcinoid tumors, 75% had above normal urinary 5-HIAA excretion and 64% had above normal serotonin excretion.
