= 5-Hydroxyindoleacetaldehyde =

Inactive metabolite of the neurotransmitter serotonin

Names
- IUPAC name 2-(5-hydroxy-1H-indol-3-yl)acetaldehyde
- Other names 5-Hydroxyindole-acetaldehyde; 5-HIAL; 5-HIAAL; 5-Hydroxytryptaldehyde; 5-Hydroxyindole-3-acetaldehyde; Serotonin aldehyde

Identifiers
CAS Number	1892-21-3
3D model (JSmol)	Interactive image
ChEBI	CHEBI:50157
ChemSpider	67261
IUPHAR/BPS	6634
KEGG	C05634
PubChem CID	74688
UNII	DAE26MT2UK
CompTox Dashboard (EPA)	DTXSID60172318
- InChI: InChI=1S/C10H9NO2/c12-4-3-7-6-11-10-2-1-8(13)5-9(7)10/h1-2,4-6,11,13H,3H2 Key: OBFAPCIUSYHFIE-UHFFFAOYSA-N
- SMILES: C1=CC2=C(C=C1O)C(=CN2)CC=O

Properties
Chemical formula	C_{10}H_{9}NO_{2}
Molar mass	175.18 g/mol
- Except where otherwise noted, data are given for materials in their standard state (at 25 °C [77 °F], 100 kPa). Infobox references

5-Hydroxyindoleacetaldehyde (5-HIAL), also known as 5-hydroxytryptaldehyde or as serotonin aldehyde, is an inactive metabolite and metabolic intermediate of the monoamine neurotransmitter serotonin (5-hydroxytryptamine; 5-HT).

5-HIAL is formed from serotonin by oxidative deamination via monoamine oxidase (MAO). MAO-mediated deamination is the primary metabolic pathway of serotonin inactivation. Monoamine oxidase A (MAO-A) has about 120-fold higher affinity for serotonin than monoamine oxidase B (MAO-B). In relation to this, MAO-A is the main isozyme of MAO involved in serotonin degradation.

Following its formation, 5-HIAL is metabolized by aldehyde dehydrogenase (ALDH) to form 5-hydroxyindoleacetic acid (5-HIAA). 5-HIAL can also be converted into small amounts of 5-hydroxytryptophol (5-HTOL; also known as 5-hydroxyindolethanol or 5-HIET) by either aldehyde reductase (ALR/ALDR) or alcohol dehydrogenase (ADH). However, brain concentrations of 5-HTOL are only 1 to 5% of those of 5-HIAA.

Use of ethanol (alcohol) can dramatically increase 5-HTOL formation by inhibiting ALDH and enhancing ADH activity. As a result, the ratio of 5-HTOL to 5-HIAA is a sensitive and reliable marker of recent ethanol ingestion and has been suggested for use in clinical and forensic contexts.

Besides oxidative deamination by MAO into 5-HIAL, serotonin can also be conjugated by glucuronidation via glucuronyltransferases, conjugated by sulfation via sulfotransferases, acetylated and then methylated into melatonin (N-acetyl-5-methoxytryptamine) (which occurs mainly in the pineal gland), and converted into certain other metabolites like 5-hydroxyindole thiazoladine carboxylic acid (5-HITCA). However, these secondary metabolic pathways appear to play only a minor role in serotonin metabolism.

5-HIAL has been implicated in producing neurotoxicity and in the development and progression of neurodegenerative diseases.

== See also ==
- Indoleacetaldehyde (IAL)
- 3,4-Dihydroxyphenylacetaldehyde (DOPAL)
- 3,4-Dihydroxyphenylglycolaldehyde (DOPEGAL)
