= 4-Hydroxyphenylacetaldehyde =

Names
- Preferred IUPAC name (4-Hydroxyphenyl)acetaldehyde
- Other names p-Hydroxyphenylacetaldehyde

Identifiers
CAS Number	7339-87-9
3D model (JSmol)	Interactive image
ChEBI	CHEBI:15621
ChemSpider	389113
ECHA InfoCard	100.216.847
EC Number	689-849-1
KEGG	C03765
PubChem CID	440113
UNII	HDJ7B4KB3X
CompTox Dashboard (EPA)	DTXSID00223631
- InChI: InChI=1S/C8H8O2/c9-6-5-7-1-3-8(10)4-2-7/h1-4,6,10H,5H2 Key: IPRPPFIAVHPVJH-UHFFFAOYSA-N
- SMILES: C1=CC(=CC=C1CC=O)O

Properties
Chemical formula	C_{8}H_{8}O_{2}
Molar mass	136.150 g·mol^{−1}
Appearance	White solid
Melting point	118 °C (244 °F; 391 K)

Hazards
- GHS labelling
Pictograms	(GHS07: Exclamation mark)
Signal word	Warning
Hazard statements	H302, H312, H315, H319, H332, H335
Precautionary statements	P261, P264, P270, P271, P280, P301+P312, P302+P352, P304+P312, P304+P340, P305+P351+P338, P312, P321, P322, P330, P332+P313, P337+P313, P362, P363, P403+P233, P405, P501
- Except where otherwise noted, data are given for materials in their standard state (at 25 °C [77 °F], 100 kPa). Infobox references

4-Hydroxyphenylacetaldehyde, also known as p-hydroxyphenylacetaldehyde, is a natural product with the formula HOC_{6}H_{4}CH_{2}CHO. It is a derivative of phenylacetaldehyde and occurs as a white solid at room temperature.

== Synthesis ==
4-Hydroxyphenylacetaldehyde can be synthesized from (L-tyrosine) via a parsley tyrosine decarboxylase.

== Occurrence ==
4-Hydroxyphenylacetaldehyde is produced from the metabolism of tyramine by monoamine oxidase (MAO) enzymes in humans and the tyramine oxidase (tynA) enzyme in Escherichia coli. In both species, it is subsequently metabolized into 4-hydroxyphenylacetate by aldehyde dehydrogenase (ALDH) enzymes in humans and the phenylacetaldehyde dehydrogenase (feaB) enzyme in E. coli.

The condensation of 4-hydroxyphenylacetaldehyde and dopamine is a key step in the biosynthesis of benzylisoquinoline alkaloids. These natural products include berberine and morphine.
