= 4-hydroxyphenylacetaldehyde dehydrogenase =

Class of enzymes

Identifiers
- EC no.: 1.2.1.53
- CAS no.: 109456-56-6

Databases
- IntEnz: IntEnz view
- BRENDA: BRENDA entry
- ExPASy: NiceZyme view
- KEGG: KEGG entry
- MetaCyc: metabolic pathway
- PRIAM: profile
- PDB structures: RCSB PDB PDBe PDBsum
- Gene Ontology: AmiGO / QuickGO
Search
- PMC: articles
- PubMed: articles
- NCBI: proteins

In enzymology, 4-hydroxyphenylacetaldehyde dehydrogenase (EC 1.2.1.53) is an enzyme that catalyzes the chemical reaction

4-Hydroxyphenylacetaldehyde
+ NAD^{+}
H_{2}O
H^{+}
H_{2}O
H^{+}
4-Hydroxyphenylacetic acid
+ NADH

The three substrates of this enzyme are 4-hydroxyphenylacetaldehyde, oxidised nicotinamide adenine dinucleotide (NAD^{+}), and water. Its products are 4-hydroxyphenylacetic acid, reduced NADH, and a proton.

This enzyme belongs to the family of oxidoreductases, specifically those acting on the aldehyde or oxo group of donor with NAD+ or NADP+ as acceptor. The systematic name of this enzyme class is 4-hydroxyphenylacetaldehyde:NAD+ oxidoreductase. This enzyme is also called 4-HPAL dehydrogenase. This enzyme participates in tyrosine metabolism.
