= Dihydroxyphenylethylene glycol =

Names
- Preferred IUPAC name 4-(1,2-Dihydroxyethyl)benzene-1,2-diol
- Other names 3,4-Dihydroxyphenylglycol; DOPEG; DHPG

Identifiers
CAS Number	3343-19-9
3D model (JSmol)	Interactive image; Interactive image
ChEBI	CHEBI:1387
ChemSpider	82648
ECHA InfoCard	100.044.768
KEGG	C05576
MeSH	Dihydroxyphenylethylene+glycol
PubChem CID	91528
UNII	UEH9K539KJ
CompTox Dashboard (EPA)	DTXSID20865451
- InChI: InChI=1S/C8H10O4/c9-4-8(12)5-1-2-6(10)7(11)3-5/h1-3,8-12H,4H2 Key: MTVWFVDWRVYDOR-UHFFFAOYSA-N; InChI=1/C8H10O4/c9-4-8(12)5-1-2-6(10)7(11)3-5/h1-3,8-12H,4H2 Key: MTVWFVDWRVYDOR-UHFFFAOYAY
- SMILES: C1=CC(=C(C=C1C(CO)O)O)O; Oc1ccc(cc1O)C(O)CO

Properties
Chemical formula	C_{8}H_{10}O_{4}
Molar mass	170.164 g·mol^{−1}
- Except where otherwise noted, data are given for materials in their standard state (at 25 °C [77 °F], 100 kPa). verify (what is ?) Infobox references

3,4-Dihydroxyphenylethylene glycol (DOPEG), also known as 3,4-dihydroxyphenylglycol (DHPG), is a metabolite of norepinephrine through monoamine oxidase.
