= Arda Green =

American biochemist (1899–1958)

- Born: May 7, 1899
- Died: January 22, 1958 (aged 58)
- Alma mater: University of California, Berkeley; Johns Hopkins University
- Occupation: Biochemist
- Employer: Cleveland Clinic (1945–); Harvard University; Washington University in St. Louis (1941–)
- Awards: Garvan–Olin Medal (1958)

Arda Alden Green (May 7, 1899 – January 22, 1958) was born in Prospect, Pennsylvania, and was an American biochemist who co-discovered the neurotransmitter serotonin and discovered the reaction responsible for firefly bioluminescence. She is also known for contributing to Gerty Cori and Carl Cori's elucidation of the Cori cycle and showing how pH affects hemoglobin's ability to bind and transport oxygen. She received the Garvan-Olin Medal from the American Chemical Society for her work.

== Early life and education ==
Arda Green was born in Prospect, Pennsylvania, daughter of Vennis A. Green and Melva Stevenson Green. Her father taught chemistry, and her sister Metta Clare Green (Loomis) earned a PhD in physics. The Green family moved to California when Arda was a girl. Arda Green earned undergraduate degrees in chemistry and philosophy at the University of California at Berkeley in 1921; she continued into graduate study of philosophy, but soon shifted her focus to medicine. She earned a medical degree at Johns Hopkins University in 1927.

She started medical studies at Berkeley, but took a year off to study under protein biochemist Edwin J. Cohn at Harvard University at the encouragement of Herbert M. Evans. She then completed her medical studies at Johns Hopkins University, where she worked on electrolyte conductivity in membranes with Leonor Michaelis and graduated in 1927.

== Career ==
After graduate study, Green worked as a National Research Council fellow in medicine at Harvard University, working in the laboratory of Edwin Cohn and specializing in developing methods for isolating and purifying proteins. In the period from 1930 until 1932, Green conducted research at Woods Hole Oceanographic Institution where she worked with Alfred C. Redfield on respiration in porpoises and a project on hemoglobin in certain fish. She collaborated with Ronald M. Ferry on studies into hemoglobin's pH dependence and would later continue characterizing hemoglobin's solubility and interactions with carbon dioxide and carbon monoxide. During her time at Harvard, she also worked as a research fellow in the lab of Lawrence J. Henderson, spent seven years as a research associate in pediatrics, and tutored biochemical sciences at Radcliffe College.

In 1941, she moved to the Washington University School of Medicine, where she worked with Gerty Cori and Carl Cori as an assistant professor of biochemistry. Green isolated pure phosphorylase, a key enzyme in the Cori cycle pathway that breaks down the sugar storage molecule glycogen, playing a critical role in the elucidation of glycogen metabolism. At Washington University she also purified other important metabolic enzymes including aldolase, which breaks down fructose.

In 1945, she was appointed to the faculty at the Cleveland Clinic, working with Irvine Page. It was at Cleveland that she co-discovered and named serotonin, an important organic compound, with Page and Maurice M. Rapport. She also isolated and studied, in collaboration with F. M. Bumpus, molecules important in blood pressure regulation including angiotensinogen (the precursor to angiotensin) and angiotonin (hypertension).

Green's career concluded at Johns Hopkins University; she began studying the chemistry of bioluminescence with William D. McElroy at the McCollum-Pratt Institute there in 1953. She isolated firefly luciferase, discovered the reaction that makes fireflies glow, and began work on bacterial bioluminescence, but was unable to complete it due to illness.

Green received the Garvan-Olin Medal, the top award for achievements in chemistry, from the American Chemical Society in autumn 1957 and it was formally awarded posthumously in April 1958.

== Personal life ==
Green died in January 1958, from breast cancer, at the age of 58.
