= Phenylglyoxal =

- Skeletal formula

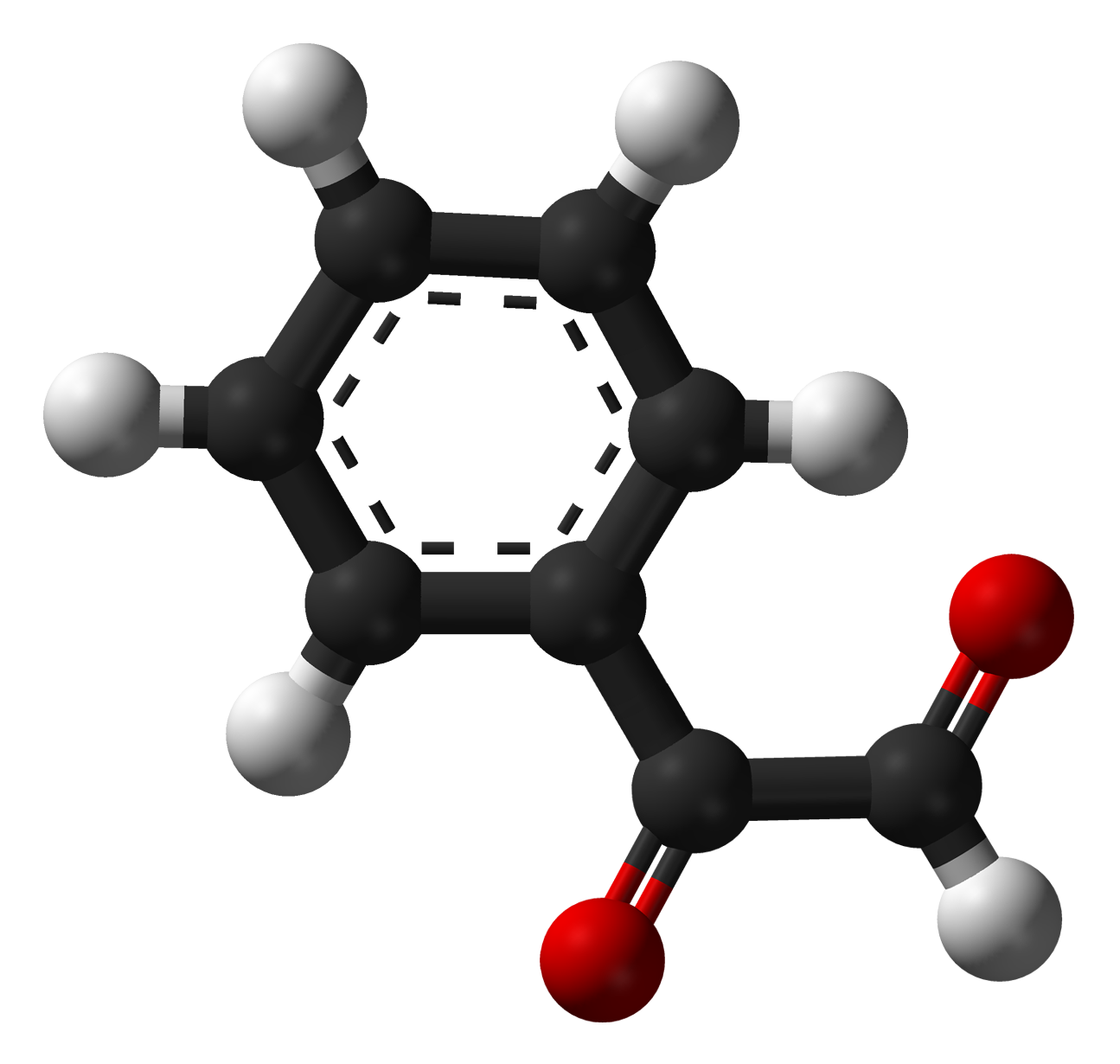
- Ball-and-stick model

Names
- Preferred IUPAC name 2-Oxo-2-phenylacetaldehyde
- Systematic IUPAC name 2-Oxo-2-phenylethanal
- Other names Phenylglyoxal; 1-Phenylethanedione

Identifiers
CAS Number	1075-06-5 (monohydrate); 1074-12-0 (anhydrous)
3D model (JSmol)	Interactive image
ChEMBL	ChEMBL233632
ChemSpider	13470
ECHA InfoCard	100.012.761
EC Number	214-036-1
PubChem CID	14090
RTECS number	KM5775180
UNII	N45G3015PA
CompTox Dashboard (EPA)	DTXSID8025888
- InChI: InChI=1S/C8H6O2/c9-6-8(10)7-4-2-1-3-5-7/h1-6H Key: OJUGVDODNPJEEC-UHFFFAOYSA-N; InChI=1/C8H6O2/c9-6-8(10)7-4-2-1-3-5-7/h1-6H Key: OJUGVDODNPJEEC-UHFFFAOYAA
- SMILES: O=C(C=O)c1ccccc1

Properties
Chemical formula	C_{8}H_{6}O_{2}
Molar mass	134.13 g/mol (anhydrous)
Appearance	yellow liquid (anhydrous) white crystals (hydrate)
Density	? g/cm^{3}
Melting point	76 to 79 °C (169 to 174 °F; 349 to 352 K) (hydrate)
Boiling point	63 to 65 °C (145 to 149 °F; 336 to 338 K) (0.5 mmHg, anhydrous)
Solubility in water	forms the hydrate
Solubility in other solvents	common organic solvents

Hazards
- Occupational safety and health (OHS/OSH)
Main hazards	toxic
- GHS labelling
Pictograms	(GHS07: Exclamation mark)
Signal word	Warning
Hazard statements	H302, H315, H319, H335
Precautionary statements	P261, P264, P270, P271, P280, P301+P312, P302+P352, P304+P340, P305+P351+P338, P312, P321, P330, P332+P313, P337+P313, P362, P403+P233, P405, P501

Related compounds
Related aldehydes	3,4-Dihydroxyphenylacetaldehyde Methylglyoxal; Phenylacetaldehyde
Related compounds	benzil glyoxal acetophenone
- Except where otherwise noted, data are given for materials in their standard state (at 25 °C [77 °F], 100 kPa). verify (what is ?) Infobox references

Phenylglyoxal is the organic compound with the formula C_{6}H_{5}C(O)C(O)H. It contains both an aldehyde and a ketone functional group. It is yellow liquid when anhydrous but readily forms a colorless crystalline hydrate. It has been used as a reagent to modify the amino acid, arginine. It has also been used to attach chemical payload (probes) to the amino acid citrulline and to peptides/proteins.

== Properties ==
Like some other aldehydes, phenylglyoxal polymerizes upon standing, as indicated by solidification of the liquid. Upon heating, this polymer "cracks" to give back the yellow aldehyde. Dissolution of phenylglyoxal in water gives crystals of the hydrate:

C_{6}H_{5}C(O)COH + H_{2}O → C_{6}H_{5}C(O)CH(OH)_{2}

Upon heating, the hydrate loses water and regenerates the anhydrous liquid.

== Preparation ==
Phenylglyoxal was first prepared by thermal decomposition of the sulfite derivative of the oxime:

C_{6}H_{5}C(O)CH(NOSO_{2}H) + 2 H_{2}O → C_{6}H_{5}C(O)CHO + NH_{4}HSO_{4}

It may also be prepared from methyl benzoate by a reaction with potassium dimsyl to give an intermediate β-ketosulfoxide, which undergoes a Pummerer-type rearrangement, followed by oxidation by with copper(II) acetate. Alternatively, it can also be prepared by oxidation of acetophenone with selenium dioxide.
