= Indole-3-pyruvate monooxygenase =

Class of enzymes

Identifiers
- EC no.: 1.14.13.168

Databases
- IntEnz: IntEnz view
- BRENDA: BRENDA entry
- ExPASy: NiceZyme view
- KEGG: KEGG entry
- MetaCyc: metabolic pathway
- PRIAM: profile
- PDB structures: RCSB PDB PDBe PDBsum
Search
- PMC: articles
- PubMed: articles
- NCBI: proteins

Indole-3-pyruvate monooxygenase (EC 1.14.13.168, YUC2 (gene), spi1 (gene)) is an enzyme with systematic name indole-3-pyruvate,NADPH:oxygen oxidoreductase (1-hydroxylating, decarboxylating). This enzyme catalyses the following chemical reaction

indole-3-pyruvic acid
+ NADPH + H^{+}
O_{2}
H_{2}O
indole-3-acetic acid
+ NADP^{+} + CO_{2}

The four substrates of this enzyme are indole-3-pyruvic acid, reduced nicotinamide adenine dinucleotide phosphate (NADPH), oxygen, and a proton. Its products are indole-3-acetic acid, oxidised NADP^{+}, water, and carbon dioxide.

The starting material is produced from the amino acid, tryptophan, by action of the enzyme L-tryptophan—pyruvate aminotransferase. The product of the reaction is the main auxin plant hormone.
