= 3,4-Dihydroxyphenylacetaldehyde =

- Kekulé, skeletal formula of 3,4-dihydroxyphenylacetaldehyde

Names
- Preferred IUPAC name (3,4-Dihydroxyphenyl)acetaldehyde
- Other names DOPAL; 2-(3,4-Dihydroxyphenyl)acetaldehyde; Dopaldehyde; Dopamine aldehyde

Identifiers
CAS Number	5707-55-1
3D model (JSmol)	Interactive image; Interactive image
Abbreviations	DOPAL
ChEBI	CHEBI:27978
ChemSpider	106504
ECHA InfoCard	100.237.172
IUPHAR/BPS	6632
KEGG	C04043
MeSH	3,4-dihydroxyphenylacetaldehyde
PubChem CID	119219
UNII	F2E9Q24TSL
CompTox Dashboard (EPA)	DTXSID10205680
- InChI: InChI=1S/C8H8O3/c9-4-3-6-1-2-7(10)8(11)5-6/h1-2,4-5,10-11H,3H2 Key: IADQVXRMSNIUEL-UHFFFAOYSA-N; InChI=1/C8H8O3/c9-4-3-6-1-2-7(10)8(11)5-6/h1-2,4-5,10-11H,3H2 Key: IADQVXRMSNIUEL-UHFFFAOYAV
- SMILES: Oc1ccc(CC=O)cc1O; OC1=CC=C(CC=O)C=C1O

Properties
Chemical formula	C_{8}H_{8}O_{3}
Molar mass	152.149 g·mol^{−1}
Density	1.306 g/mL
Boiling point	351 °C (664 °F; 624 K)

Related compounds
Related 2-phenyl aldehydes	Phenylacetaldehyde Phenylglyoxal
- Except where otherwise noted, data are given for materials in their standard state (at 25 °C [77 °F], 100 kPa). verify (what is ?) Infobox references

3,4-Dihydroxyphenylacetaldehyde (DOPAL), also known as dopamine aldehyde, is a metabolite of the monoamine neurotransmitter dopamine formed by monoamine oxidase (MAO).

Other metabolic pathways of dopamine metabolism include methylation by catechol O-methyltransferase (COMT) into 3-methoxytyramine and β-hydroxylation by dopamine β-hydroxylase (DBH) into norepinephrine. There is also spontaneous oxidation of dopamine into dopamine quinones and reactive oxygen species.

== Dopaminergic neurotoxicity ==
DOPAL is known to be a dopaminergic neurotoxin. It is much more potent in this regard than dopamine itself and other metabolites of dopamine. According to the catecholaldehyde hypothesis, DOPAL plays a role in aging-related dopaminergic neurodegeneration and in the pathogenesis of Parkinson's disease. DOPAL is detoxified mainly by aldehyde dehydrogenase (ALDH). DOPAL is a metabolite of dopamine formed by monoamine oxidase (MAO). In differentiated neuronal cells of the PC12 line, physiological concentrations of DOPAL in isolated mitochondria were highly potent in inducing a pathway associated with programmed cell death (or apoptosis), permeability transition. This suggests the cytotoxity of DOPAL and its role in the progression of Parkinson's disease, which has long been associated with mitochondrial abnormalities and neurotoxicity by way of dopaminergic compounds, while reducing the emphasis on other dopamine derivatives and metabolites.

Aldehyde dehydrogenase inhibitors (ALDH inhibitors), which prevent the catabolism of DOPAL and thereby increase DOPAL levels, can produce dopaminergic neurotoxicity or augment dopaminergic neurodegeneration. Examples of ALDH inhibitors include disulfiram and other known dopaminergic neurotoxins including benomyl, daidzin, dieldrin, methylmercury, rotenone, and ziram. DOPAL itself is also known to inhibit ALDH at high concentrations (>5 μM).

== See also ==
- 3,4-Dihydroxyphenylglycolaldehyde (DOPEGAL)
- 5-Hydroxyindoleacetaldehyde (5-HIAL)
