= Maurice M. Rapport =

American researcher

Maurice Rapport
- Born: September 23, 1919; Atlantic City, New Jersey
- Died: August 18, 2011 (aged 91); Durham, North Carolina
- Education: The City College of New York and the California Institute of Technology
- Known for: Serotonin
- Scientific career
- Fields: Biochemistry

Maurice Rapport (1919–2011) was a biochemist who is best known for his work with the neurotransmitter serotonin. Rapport, Irvine H. Page, and Arda A. Green worked together to isolate and name the chemical. Alone, Rapport identified its structure and published his findings in 1948. Research since its discovery has implicated serotonin with mood regulation, appetite, sexual drive, and sleep as well as gastrointestinal roles. After his work with serotonin, Rapport did important research with cancer, cardiovascular disease, connective-tissue disease and demyelinating diseases.

== Personal life ==
Maurice Rapoport was born on September 23, 1919, in Atlantic City, New Jersey. His mother changed the spelling of the family name to Rapport. His father was a furrier from Russia who left the family when Rapport was a small child. Rapport graduated from DeWitt Clinton High School in the Bronx, New York and went on to earn a bachelor's degree in chemistry from the City College of New York in 1940. He obtained his doctorate in organic chemistry in 1946 from California Institute of Technology.

== Career ==
=== Serotonin research ===
In 1946, Maurice Rapport began working in the Cleveland Clinic Foundation which was directed by Irvine H. Page. Since the 1860s, we had known of a substance in the serum of blood vessels that promotes clotting. Rapport was assigned the project of isolating this serum. They enlisted the help of Arda A. Green, a physical biochemist. The substance was acquired by leaving a test tube of the reagents in a cold room while Rapport went on vacation. When he returned he isolated the crystals of the desired substance. In a paper published in 1948, they gave it a name: serotonin, derived from “serum” and “tonic”.

In 1948, Rapport left the Cleveland Clinic for a position at Columbia University and continued searching for serotonin's structure. In May 1949, the structure of serotonin was discovered to be 5-hydroxytryptamine (5-HT).

Serotonin was found to be the same substance that Dr. Vittorio Erspamer had been studying since the 1930s called “enteramine”. Enteramine had a substantial place in scientific literature due to Erspamer's research into its role in smooth muscle constriction and intestinal tracts. Despite Erspamer's research, Rapport's discovery of serotonin's structure allowed other researchers to synthesize the substance and further study its role in the body.

The structure of serotonin was given to Upjohn Drug Company where researchers focused on the role of serotonin in the bodily processes such as blood vessel constriction. In 1954, Betty Twarog discovered the distribution of serotonin in the brain. Further research illustrated how serotonin plays a major role in the central nervous system and digestive tract. The understanding of serotonin has led to a progression in our view of mental illness and allowed the development of antidepressants and other drugs for hypertension and migraines.

=== Later research ===
After his work with serotonin, Rapport worked at the Sloan-Kettering Institute for Cancer Research. His contributions involved the activity and structures of lipids in relation to immunological activity. Specifically, he isolated cytolipin H from human cancer tissue in 1958. This led to a better understanding of our immune system. He also was a professor at the Albert Einstein College of Medicine. There he isolated two glysosphingolipids and studied antibodies to gangliosides. These findings were useful to further pharmacological studies relating these substances to demyelinating diseases such as amyotrophic lateral sclerosis (ALS).

In 1968, Rapport returned to Columbia University as chief of pharmacology and professor of biochemistry. The next year, he became the chief of the new neuroscience division which combined the chemistry, pharmacology, and bacteriology divisions. He retired in 1986 and remained in the neurology department of the Albert Einstein College of Medicine as a visiting professor.

== Awards and honors ==
Because of this work with serotonin, Rapport was awarded the Fulbright Scholarship in 1952 to study with Dr. Daniel Bovet, who later won a Nobel Prize for his work in pharmacology.
