= Felix Ehrlich =

German chemist and biochemist (1877–1942)

Felix Ehrlich (16 June 1877 in Harriehausen (today incorporated into Bad Gandersheim) – 23 January 1942 in Obernigk near Breslau) was a German chemist and biochemist.

== Life and work ==
Felix Ehrlich studied in Berlin and Munich. After receiving his doctorate in 1900, he worked at the Institute of Sugar Industry in Berlin. In 1906 he obtained his diploma in chemistry. From 1909 he worked as professor in Breslau, and later as director of the Institute on Biotechnology and Agriculture.

Ehrlich discovered the amino acid isoleucine in hemoglobin in 1903, developed a process for resolving racemic amino acids in 1906, described the formation of fusel oils by fermentation, amino acid during alcoholic fermentation in 1905 and worked on the structure of pectins.

Ehrlich demonstrated that yeast attacks the natural amino acids essentially by splitting off carbon dioxide and replacing the amino group with hydroxyl. By this reaction, the tryptophan gives rise to tryptophol.

== Honours ==
- 1931 Emil Fischer Medal
