= 3,4-Dihydroxymandelic acid =

Names
- Preferred IUPAC name (3,4-Dihydroxyphenyl)(hydroxy)acetic acid
- Other names 2-(3,4-Dihydroxyphenyl)-2-hydroxyacetic acid

Identifiers
CAS Number	775-01-9
3D model (JSmol)	Interactive image
ChEBI	CHEBI:27637
ChemSpider	77371
ECHA InfoCard	100.011.154
IUPHAR/BPS	6633
KEGG	C05580
MeSH	3,4-dihydroxymandelic+acid
PubChem CID	85782
UNII	WDP6VCX5T6
CompTox Dashboard (EPA)	DTXSID30862411
- InChI: InChI=1S/C8H8O5/c9-5-2-1-4(3-6(5)10)7(11)8(12)13/h1-3,7,9-11H,(H,12,13) Key: RGHMISIYKIHAJW-UHFFFAOYSA-N; InChI=1/C8H8O5/c9-5-2-1-4(3-6(5)10)7(11)8(12)13/h1-3,7,9-11H,(H,12,13) Key: RGHMISIYKIHAJW-UHFFFAOYAB
- SMILES: O=C(O)C(O)c1cc(O)c(O)cc1

Properties
Chemical formula	C_{8}H_{8}O_{5}
Molar mass	184.14612
- Except where otherwise noted, data are given for materials in their standard state (at 25 °C [77 °F], 100 kPa). verify (what is ?) Infobox references

3,4-Dihydroxymandelic acid (DHMA, DOMA) is a metabolite of norepinephrine.

Norepinephrine degradation. 3,4-Dihydroxymandelic acid is shown at right. Enzymes are shown in boxes.
