= L-tryptophan—pyruvate aminotransferase =

Class of enzymes

L-tryptophan---pyruvate aminotransferase

Identifiers
- EC no.: 2.6.1.99

Databases
- IntEnz: IntEnz view
- BRENDA: BRENDA entry
- ExPASy: NiceZyme view
- KEGG: KEGG entry
- MetaCyc: metabolic pathway
- PRIAM: profile
- PDB structures: RCSB PDB PDBe PDBsum
Search
- PMC: articles
- PubMed: articles
- NCBI: proteins

L-tryptophan—pyruvate aminotransferase (EC 2.6.1.99, TAA1 (gene), vt2 (gene)) is an enzyme with systematic name L-tryptophan:pyruvate aminotransferase. This enzyme catalyses the following chemical reaction

tryptophan
+
pyruvic acid
indole-3-pyruvic acid
+
alanine

This plant aminotransferase enzyme, along with indole-3-pyruvate monooxygenase, is responsible for the biosynthesis of the auxin plant hormone indoleacetic acid from L-tryptophan.
