= Monoamine oxidase =

Family of enzymes

Identifiers
- EC no.: 1.4.3.4
- CAS no.: 9001-66-5

Databases
- BRENDA: enzyme data
- ExPASy: NiceZyme view
- KEGG: enzyme entry
- MetaCyc: metabolic pathway
- Rhea: reactions
- PDB structures: RCSB PDB PDBe PDBsum
- Gene Ontology: AmiGO / QuickGO
Search
- PMC: articles
- PubMed: articles
- NCBI: proteins

Monoamine oxidase

Identifiers
- Symbol: MAO
- Pfam: PF01593
- InterPro: IPR001613
- OPM superfamily: 119
- OPM protein: 2z5x
- Membranome: 418
Available protein structures:
- PDB: IPR001613 PF01593 (ECOD; PDBsum)
- AlphaFold: IPR001613; PF01593

monoamine oxidase A
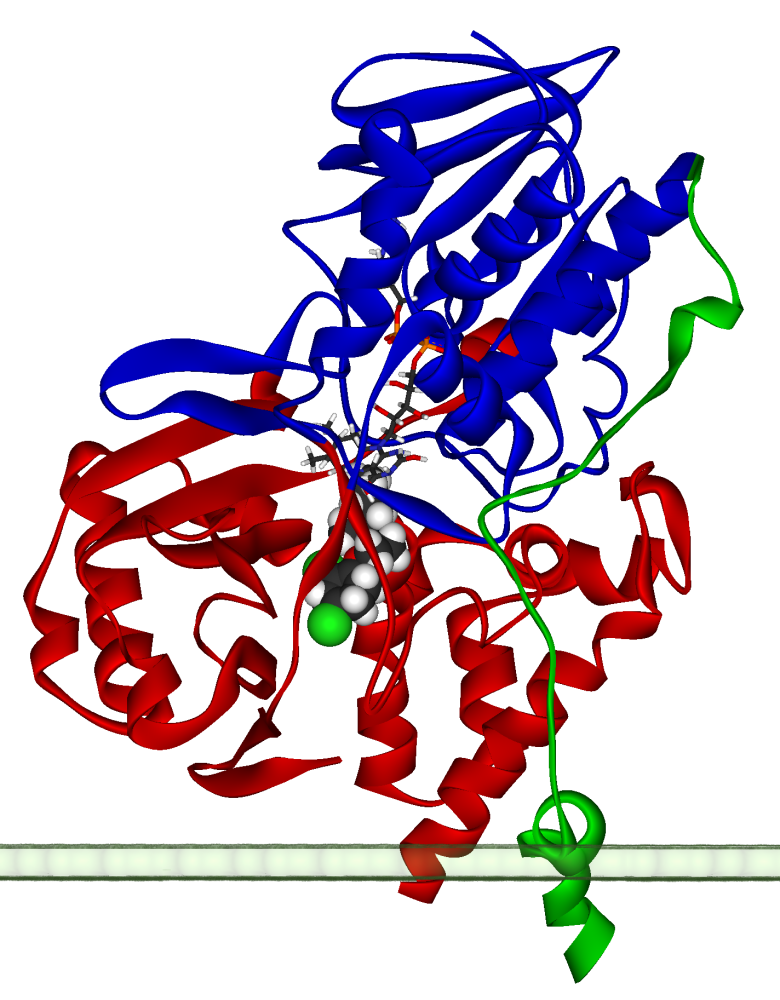
- Ribbon diagram of a monomer of human MAO-A, with FAD and clorgiline bound, oriented as if attached to the outer membrane of a mitochondrion. From PDB: 2BXS.

Identifiers
- Symbol: MAOA
- NCBI gene: 4128
- HGNC: 6833
- OMIM: 309850
- RefSeq: NM_000240
- UniProt: P21397

Other data
- Locus: Chr. X p11.4-p11.3
Search for
- Structures: Swiss-model
- Domains: InterPro

monoamine oxidase B
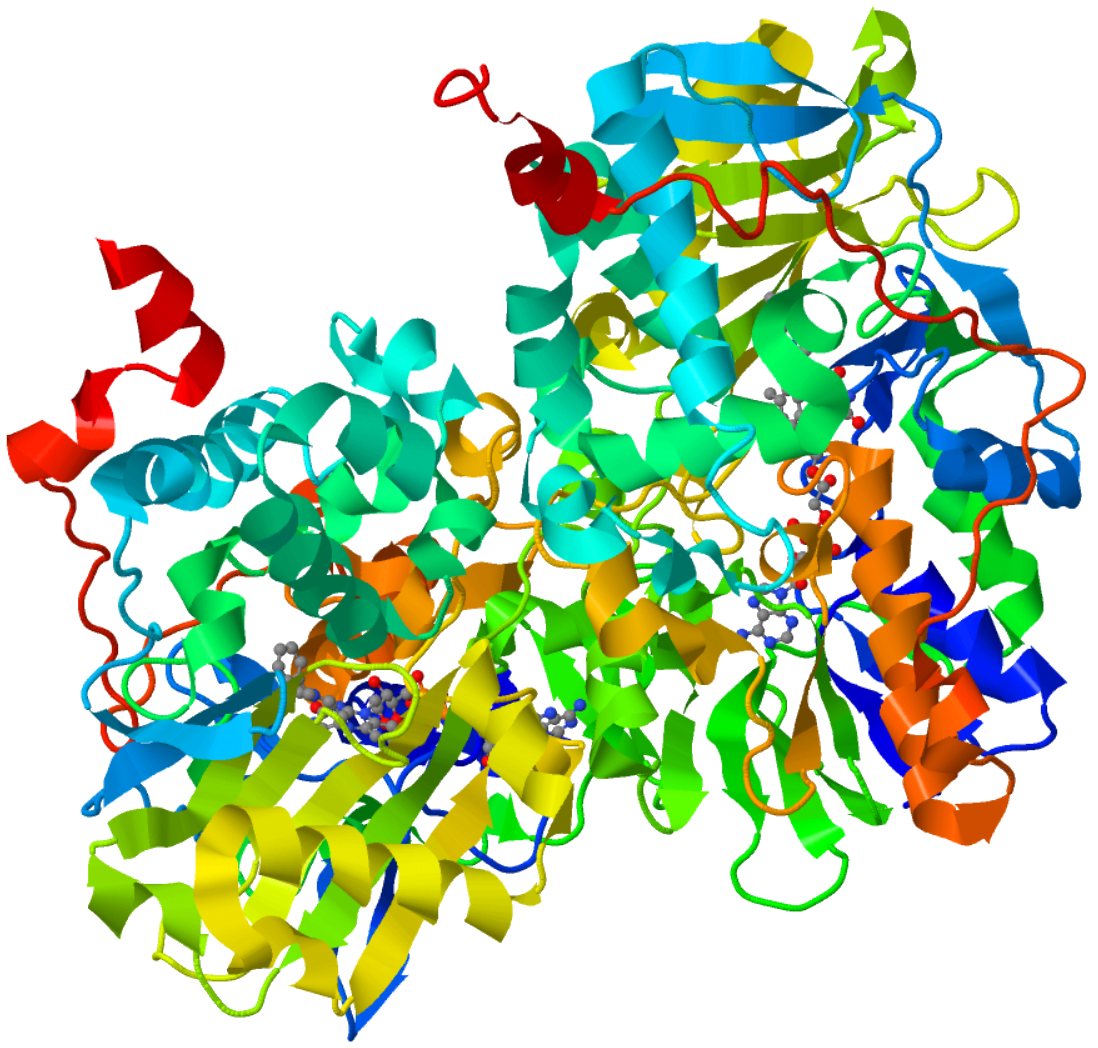
- Ribbon diagram of human MAO-B. From PDB: 1GOS.

Identifiers
- Symbol: MAOB
- NCBI gene: 4129
- HGNC: 6834
- OMIM: 309860
- RefSeq: NM_000898
- UniProt: P27338

Other data
- Locus: Chr. X p11.4-p11.3
Search for
- Structures: Swiss-model
- Domains: InterPro

Monoamine oxidases (MAO) (EC 1.4.3.4) are a family of enzymes that catalyze the oxidation of monoamines, employing oxygen to clip off their amine group. They are found bound to the outer membrane of mitochondria in most cell types of the body. The first such enzyme was discovered in 1928 by Mary Bernheim in the liver and was named tyramine oxidase. The MAOs belong to the protein family of flavin-containing amine oxidoreductases.

MAOs are important in the breakdown of monoamines ingested in food, and also serve to inactivate monoamine neurotransmitters. Because of the latter, they are involved in a number of psychiatric and neurological diseases, some of which can be treated with monoamine oxidase inhibitors (MAOIs) which block the action of MAOs.

== Subtypes and tissue distribution ==
In humans there are two types of MAO: MAO-A and MAO-B.

- Both are found in neurons and astroglia.
- Outside the central nervous system:
  - MAO-A is also found in the liver, pulmonary vascular endothelium, gastrointestinal tract, and placenta.
  - MAO-B is mostly found in blood platelets.

MAO-A appears at roughly 80% of adulthood levels at birth, increasing very slightly after the first 4 years of life, while MAO-B is almost non-detectable in the infant brain. Regional distribution of the monoamine oxidases is characterized by extremely high levels of both MAOs in the hypothalamus and hippocampal uncus, as well as a large amount of MAO-B with very little MAO-A in the striatum and globus pallidus. The cortex has relatively high levels of only MAO-A, with the exception of areas of the cingulate cortex, which contains a balance of both. Autopsied brains demonstrated the predicted increased concentration of MAO-A in regions dense in serotonergic neurotransmission, however MAO-B only correlated with norepinephrine.

Other studies, in which the activities of MAO (not protein amounts) were examined in rat brain, revealed the highest MAO-B activity in the median eminence of hypothalamus. Dorsal raphe nucleus and medial preoptic area have relatively high MAO-B activity, but much lower than MAO-B activity in the median eminence. Among cerebral endocrine glands, pineal gland has high MAO-B activity (its median value is lower than that for median eminence and higher than that for medial preoptic area). Pituitary has the lowest level of MAO-B activity when compared with brain areas studied.

== Function ==
Norepinephrine degradation. Monoamine oxidase is shown left in the blue box.

Monoamine oxidases catalyze the oxidative deamination of monoamines. In the first part of the reaction, cofactor FAD oxidizes the substrate yielding the corresponding imine which converts the cofactor into its reduced form FADH2. The imine is then non-enzymatically hydrolyzed to the corresponding ketone (or aldehyde) and ammonia. Oxygen is used to restore the reduced FADH2 cofactor back to the active FAD form. Monoamine oxidases contain the covalently bound cofactor FAD and are, thus, classified as flavoproteins. Monoamine oxidase A and B share roughly 70% of their structure and both have substrate binding sites that are predominantly hydrophobic. Two tyrosine residues (398, 435 within MAO-B, 407 and 444 within MAO-A) in the binding pocket that are commonly involved in inhibitor activity have been hypothesized to be relevant to orienting substrates, and mutations of these residues are relevant to mental health. Four main models have been proposed for the mechanism of electron transfer (single electron transfer, hydrogen atom transfer, nucleophilic model, and hydride transfer) although there is insufficient evidence to support any of them.

In 2021, it was discovered that MAO-B does not mediate dopamine catabolism in the rodent striatum but instead participates in striatal γ-aminobutyric acid (GABA) synthesis from putrescine and that synthesized GABA in turn inhibits dopaminergic neurons in this brain area. It has been found that MAO-B, via the putrescine pathway, importantly mediates GABA synthesis in astrocytes in various brain areas, including in the hippocampus, cerebellum, striatum, cerebral cortex, and substantia nigra pars compacta (SNpc). These findings may warrant a rethinking of the actions of MAO-B inhibitors in the treatment of Parkinson's disease.

== Substrates and specificities ==
Monoamine oxidases are well known enzymes in pharmacology, since they are the target for the action of a number of monoamine oxidase inhibitor drugs. MAO-A is particularly important in the catabolism of monoamines ingested in food. Both MAOs are also vital to the inactivation of monoamine neurotransmitters, for which they display different specificities.

- Serotonin, norepinephrine, and epinephrine are mainly broken down by MAO-A.
- Phenethylamine and benzylamine are mainly broken down by MAO-B.
- Both forms metabolize dopamine, tyramine, and tryptamine; however, some evidence suggests MAO-B may not be responsible for a significant amount of dopamine degradation.

Specific reactions catalyzed by MAO include:

- Serotonin to 5-hydroxyindoleacetaldehyde (5-HIAL; 5-HIAAL; serotonin aldehyde)
- 5-Methoxytryptamine (melatonin metabolite) to 5-methoxyindoleacetaldehyde (5-MIAL; 5-MIAAL)
- Tryptamine to indoleacetaldehyde (IAAL; tryptamine aldehyde)
- Dopamine to 3,4-dihydroxyphenylacetaldehyde (DOPAL; dopamine aldehyde)
- Norepinephrine to 3,4-dihydroxymandelaldehyde (DHMAL; norepinephrine/epinephrine aldehyde)
- Epinephrine to 3,4-dihydroxymandelaldehyde (DHMAL; norepinephrine/epinephrine aldehyde)
- Normetanephrine to 3-methoxy-4-hydroxymandelaldehyde (MHMAL; normetanephrine/metanephrine aldehyde)
- Metanephrine to 3-methoxy-4-hydroxymandelaldehyde (MHMAL; normetanephrine/metanephrine aldehyde)
- 3-Methoxytyramine to 3-methoxy-4-hydroxyphenylacetaldehyde (HMPAL)
- Phenethylamine to phenylacetaldehyde (PAAL)
- Tyramine to 4-hydroxyphenylacetaldehyde (HPAL)
- Benzylamine to benzaldehyde

Other endogenous substrates of MAO include telemethylhistamine, a metabolite of histamine, and N-acetylputrescine, a metabolite of putrescine and a precursor and metabolic intermediate in a minor metabolic pathway resulting in the synthesis of γ-aminobutyric acid (GABA).

Besides endogenous compounds, a variety of exogenous compounds and drugs are substrates of the MAOs. Examples include substituted phenethylamine sympathomimetics and sympatholytics like phenylephrine, propranolol, and pronethalol, substituted tryptamine serotonergic agents like dimethyltryptamine (DMT), 5-MeO-DMT, bufotenin, almotriptan, rizatriptan, and sumatriptan, and other compounds like bicifadine, citalopram, CP-409092, KW-2449, milacemide, MPTP, nomifensine, primaquine, rivaroxaban, sertraline, and ticlopidine, among others. Haloperidol is another possible substrate of MAO, which may contribute to formation of its neurotoxic metabolite HPP^{+}.

== Clinical significance ==
Because of the vital role that MAOs play in the inactivation of neurotransmitters, MAO dysfunction (too much or too little MAO activity) is thought to contribute to a number of psychiatric and neurological disorders. Unusually high or low levels of MAOs in the body have been associated with schizophrenia, depression, attention deficit disorder, substance abuse, migraines, and irregular sexual maturation. Monoamine oxidase inhibitors are one of the major classes of drug prescribed for the treatment of depression, although they are often last-line treatment due to risk of the drug's interaction with diet or other drugs. Excessive levels of catecholamines (epinephrine, norepinephrine, and dopamine) may lead to a hypertensive crisis, and excessive levels of serotonin may lead to serotonin syndrome.

In fact, MAO-A inhibitors act as antidepressant and anti-anxiety agents, whereas MAO-B inhibitors are used alone or in combination to treat Alzheimer's disease and Parkinson's disease. Some research suggests that certain phenotypes of depression, such as those with anxiety, and "atypical" symptoms involving psychomotor retardation, weight gain and interpersonal sensitivity respond better to MAO inhibitors than to other classes of anti-depressant. However the findings related to this have not been consistent. MAOIs may be effective in treatment resistant depression, especially when it does not respond to tricyclic antidepressants.

=== Parasite interactions ===
Sleeping sickness - caused by trypanosomes - gets its name from the sleep disruption it causes in mammals. That sleep disruption is caused, at least in part, by trypanosomes' tendency to disrupt MAO activity in the orexin system.

=== Animal models ===
There are significant differences in MAO activity in different species. Dopamine is primarily deaminated by MAO-A in rats, but by MAO-B in vervet monkeys and humans.

Mice unable to produce either MAO-A or MAO-B display autistic-like traits. These knockout mice display an increased response to stress.

==== Arthropods ====
===== Insects =====
Insect brains express MAOs, and some insecticides work by inhibiting them. An MAOI effect is especially important for chlordimeform (although one result shows little or no effect in Periplaneta americana); and dieldrin may or may not be an MAOI in Locusta migratoria.

===== Acari =====
MAO activity has been detected in Rhipicephalus microplus and chlordimeform is an MAOI in R. m..

== Genetics ==
The genes encoding MAO-A and MAO-B are located side-by-side on the short arm of the X chromosome, and have about 70% sequence similarity. Rare mutations in the gene are associated with Brunner syndrome.

A study based on the Dunedin cohort concluded that maltreated children with a low-activity polymorphism in the promoter region of the MAO-A gene were more likely to develop antisocial conduct disorders than maltreated children with the high-activity variant. Out of the 442 total males in the study (maltreated or not), 37% had the low activity variant. Of the 13 maltreated males with low MAO-A activity, 11 had been assessed as exhibiting adolescent conduct disorder and 4 were convicted for violent offenses. The suggested mechanism for this effect is the decreased ability of those with low MAO-A activity to quickly degrade norepinephrine, the synaptic neurotransmitter involved in sympathetic arousal and rage. This is argued to provide direct support for the idea that genetic susceptibility to disease is not determined at birth, but varies with exposure to environmental influences. However, most individuals with conduct disorder or convictions did not have low activity of MAO-A; maltreatment was found to have caused stronger predisposition for antisocial behavior than differences in MAO-A activity.

The claim that an interaction between low MAO-A activity and maltreatment would cause anti-social behavior has been criticized since the predisposition towards anti-social behavior could equally well have been caused by other genes inherited from abusive parents.

A possible link between predisposition to novelty seeking and a genotype of the MAO-A gene has been found.

A particular variant (or genotype), dubbed "warrior gene" in the popular press, was over-represented in Māori. This supported earlier studies finding different proportions of variants in different ethnic groups. This is the case for many genetic variants, with 33% White/Non-Hispanic, 61% Asian/Pacific Islanders having the low-activity MAO-A promoter variant.

== Aging ==
Unlike many other enzymes, MAO-B activity is increased during aging in the brain of humans and other mammals. Increased MAO-B activity was also found in the pineal gland of aging rats. This may contribute to lowered levels of monoamines in aged brain and pineal gland.

== See also ==
- Cheese effect
- I_{2} receptor
- Monoamine oxidase inhibitor
