= Phenylacetaldehyde =

Names
- Preferred IUPAC name Phenylacetaldehyde

Identifiers
CAS Number	122-78-1
3D model (JSmol)	Interactive image
Abbreviations	BnCHO; BnCOH; PhCH_{2}CHO; PhCH_{2}COH
Beilstein Reference	385791
ChEBI	CHEBI:16424
ChemSpider	13876539
ECHA InfoCard	100.004.159
EC Number	204-574-5
KEGG	C00601
PubChem CID	998
UNII	U8J5PLW9MR
CompTox Dashboard (EPA)	DTXSID3021483
- InChI: InChI=1S/C8H8O/c9-7-6-8-4-2-1-3-5-8/h1-5,7H,6H2 Key: DTUQWGWMVIHBKE-UHFFFAOYSA-N
- SMILES: O=CCc1ccccc1

Properties
Chemical formula	C_{8}H_{8}O
Molar mass	120.151 g·mol^{−1}
Appearance	Colorless liquid
Density	1.079 g/mL
Melting point	−10 °C (14 °F; 263 K)
Boiling point	195 °C (383 °F; 468 K)
Solubility in water	2.210 g/L
Magnetic susceptibility (χ)	−72.01·10^{−6} cm^{3}/mol
Refractive index (n_{D})	1.526

Hazards
- Occupational safety and health (OHS/OSH)
Main hazards	Harmful, Flammable
- GHS labelling
Pictograms	(GHS05: Corrosive) (GHS07: Exclamation mark)
Signal word	Danger
Hazard statements	H302, H314, H317
Precautionary statements	P260, P264, P264+P265, P270, P272, P280, P301+P317, P301+P330+P331, P302+P352, P302+P361+P354, P304+P340, P305+P354+P338, P316, P317, P321, P330, P333+P317, P362+P364, P363, P405, P501
Flash point	87 °C (189 °F; 360 K)

Related compounds
Related 2-phenyl aldehydes	3,4-Dihydroxyphenylacetaldehyde Phenylglyoxal
- Except where otherwise noted, data are given for materials in their standard state (at 25 °C [77 °F], 100 kPa). verify (what is ?) Infobox references

Phenylacetaldehyde is an organic compound used in the synthesis of fragrances and polymers. Phenylacetaldehyde is an aldehyde that consists of acetaldehyde bearing a phenyl substituent; the parent member of the phenylacetaldehyde class of compounds. It has a role as a human metabolite, a Saccharomyces cerevisiae metabolite, an Escherichia coli metabolite and a mouse metabolite. It is an alpha-CH2-containing aldehyde and a member of phenylacetaldehydes.

Phenylacetaldehyde is one important oxidation-related aldehyde. Exposure to styrene gives phenylacetaldehyde as a secondary metabolite. Styrene has been implicated as reproductive toxicant, neurotoxicant, or carcinogen in vivo or in vitro. Phenylacetaldehyde could be formed by diverse thermal reactions during the cooking process together with C8 compounds is identified as a major aroma–active compound in cooked pine mushroom. Phenylacetaldehyde is readily oxidized to phenylacetic acid. Therefore will eventually be hydrolyzed and oxidized to yield phenylacetic acid that will be excreted primarily in the urine in conjugated form.

== Natural occurrence ==
Phenylacetaldehyde occurs extensively in nature because it can be biosynthetically derived from the amino acid phenylalanine. Natural sources of the compound include chocolate, buckwheat, flowers, and communication pheromones from various insect orders. It is notable for being a floral attractant for numerous species of Lepidoptera; for example, it is the strongest floral attractor for the cabbage looper moth.

== Uses ==
=== Fragrances and flavors ===
The aroma of pure substance can be described as honey-like, sweet, rose, green, grassy and is added to fragrances to impart hyacinth, narcissi, or rose nuances. For similar reasons the compound can sometimes be found in flavored cigarettes and beverages.

Historically, before biotechnology approaches were developed, phenylacetaldehyde was also used to produce phenylalanine via the Strecker reaction as a step in the production of aspartame sweetener.

=== Polymers ===
Phenylacetaldehyde is used in the synthesis of polyesters where it serves as a rate-controlling additive during polymerization.

=== Natural Medicine ===
Phenylacetaldehyde is responsible for the antibiotic activity of maggot therapy.

=== MAOI ===
Theoretically, hydrazone formation and subsequent reduction of the phenylethylidenehydrazine gives phenelzine.

== Preparation ==
Phenylacetaldehyde can be obtained via various synthetic routes and precursors. Notable examples include:

- Isomerization of styrene oxide.
- Dehydrogenation of 2-Phenylethanol over silver or gold catalysts.
- Darzens reaction between benzaldehyde and chloroacetate esters.
- Wacker oxidation of styrene.
- Hofmann rearrangement of Cinnamamide (aka (2E)-3-Phenylacrylamide).
- Oxidation of Cyclooctatetraene with aqueous Mercury(II) sulfate.
- Strecker degradation of phenylalanine.

== Reactivity ==
Phenylacetaldehyde is often contaminated with polystyrene oxide polymer because of the especial lability of the benzylic alpha proton and the reactivity of the aldehyde. Aldol condensation of the initial dimer gives rise to a range of Michael acceptors and donors.
