= Indole-3-acetaldehyde =

Names
- Preferred IUPAC name (1H-Indol-3-yl)acetaldehyde
- Other names Indoleacetaldehyde; 1H-Indole-3-acetaldehyde; 2-(Indol-3-yl)acetaldehyde; Indole-3-acetaldehyde; Indoleacetaldehyde; 1H-Indol-3-ylacetaldehyde; 2-(3-Indolyl)acetaldehyde; Indol-3-ylacetaldehyde; Tryptaldehyde; IAL; IAAL

Identifiers
CAS Number	2591-98-2
3D model (JSmol)	Interactive image
ChEBI	CHEBI:18086
ChemSpider	778
KEGG	C00637
MeSH	C001655
PubChem CID	800
UNII	A346H8E8WU
CompTox Dashboard (EPA)	DTXSID90180582
- InChI: InChI=1S/C10H9NO/c12-6-5-8-7-11-10-4-2-1-3-9(8)10/h1-4,6-7,11H,5H2 Key: WHOOUMGHGSPMGR-UHFFFAOYSA-N
- SMILES: O=CCC1=CNC2=CC=CC=C12

Properties
Chemical formula	C_{10}H_{9}NO
Molar mass	159.188 g·mol^{−1}
- Except where otherwise noted, data are given for materials in their standard state (at 25 °C [77 °F], 100 kPa). Infobox references

Indole-3-acetaldehyde (IAL) belongs to the class of organic compounds known as indoles. These are compounds containing an indole moiety, which consists of pyrrole ring fused to benzene to form 2,3-benzopyrrole. It is a metabolite of tryptamine formed by monoamine oxidase (MAO).

Indole-3-acetaldehyde is a substrate for retina-specific copper amine oxidase, aldehyde dehydrogenase X (mitochondrial), amine oxidase B, amiloride-sensitive amine oxidase, aldehyde dehydrogenase (mitochondrial), fatty aldehyde dehydrogenase, 4-trimethylaminobutyraldehyde dehydrogenase, aldehyde dehydrogenase (dimeric NADP-preferring), aldehyde dehydrogenase family 7 member A1, amine oxidase A, aldehyde dehydrogenase 1A3 and membrane copper amine oxidase.

== See also ==
- 5-Hydroxyindoleacetaldehyde (5-HIAL)
