= Methyldopamine =

Methyldopamine may refer to:

- α-Methyldopamine
- Deoxyepinephrine (N-methyldopamine)
- 3-Methoxytyramine (3-O-methyldopamine)
- 4-Methoxytyramine (4-O-methyldopamine)
