= N-Methyltyramine =

Trace amine

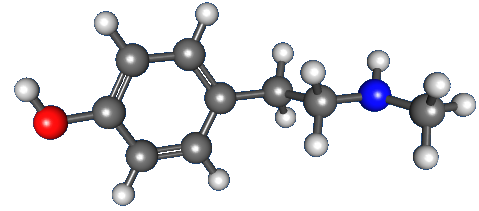

Clinical data
- Other names: Methyl-4-tyramine; 4-Hydroxy-N-methylphenethylamine; p-(2-Methylaminoethyl)phenol

Identifiers
- IUPAC name: 4-[2-(methylamino)ethyl]phenol
- CAS Number: 370-98-9
- PubChem CID: 9727
- ChemSpider: 9345
- UNII: G3S4E2F7TA
- ChEBI: CHEBI:17458
- CompTox Dashboard (EPA): DTXSID60190496
- ECHA InfoCard: 100.006.120

Chemical and physical data
- Formula: C_{9}H_{13}NO
- Molar mass: 151.209 g·mol^{−1}
- 3D model (JSmol): Interactive image
- Density: 1.03 g/cm^{3}
- Melting point: 130 to 131 °C (266 to 268 °F)
- Boiling point: 271 °C (520 °F) (183-185 °C at 9mm; 135 °C at 0.05 mm)
- Solubility in water: Moderate mg/mL (20 °C)
- SMILES: Oc1ccc(cc1)CCNC
- InChI: InChI=1S/C9H13NO/c1-10-7-6-8-2-4-9(11)5-3-8/h2-5,10-11H,6-7H2,1H3; Key:AXVZFRBSCNEKPQ-UHFFFAOYSA-N

N-Methyltyramine (NMT), also known as 4-hydroxy-N-methylphenethylamine, is a human trace amine and natural phenethylamine alkaloid found in a variety of plants. As the name implies, it is the N-methyl analog of tyramine, which is a well-known biogenic trace amine with which NMT shares many pharmacological properties. Biosynthetically, NMT is produced by the N-methylation of tyramine via the action of the enzyme phenylethanolamine N-methyltransferase in humans and tyramine N-methyltransferase in plants.

== Occurrence ==
N-methyltyramine seems to be quite widely distributed in plants.

NMT was isolated as a natural product for the first time, from germinating barley roots, by Kirkwood and Marion in 1950. These chemists found that 600 g of barley, after germination and 10-day growth, yielded 168 mg of N-methyltyramine. Since barley, via its conversion to malt, is used extensively in the production of beer, beer and malt have been examined by several groups of investigators for the presence of NMT. Citing a 1965 study by McFarlane, Poocharoen reported that beer contained ~ 5–8 mg/L of NMT. The NMT content of various malts and malt fractions was extensively studied by Poocharoen himself, who also provided a good coverage of related literature up to 1983. This researcher found a mean concentration of NMT in raw barley of ~ 5 μg/g; in green malts (i.e. barley that had been soaked in water for 2 days then germinated for 4 days), the mean concentration was ~ 21 μg/g, and in kilned malts (i.e. green malts that had been heated in a kiln for 1–2 days) the mean concentration was ~ 27 μg/g. When only green malt roots were examined, their mean content of NMT was ~ 1530 μg/g, whereas the mean level in kilned malt roots was ~ 1960 μg/g.

Studies of Acacia species have shown the presence of significant levels of NMT in their leaves: ~ 240-1240 ppm (or μg/g) in A. rigidula and ~ 190-750 ppm in A. berlandieri. The seeds of A. schweinfurthii yielded 440 μg/g of NMT.

NMT is found in bitter orange, Citrus aurantium, and a concentration of ~ 180 μg/g has been reported from an extract made from the ripe fruit, although the method by which this extract was prepared is not very clearly described.

Biosynthetic pathways for catecholamines and trace amines in the human brain
N-Methyltyramine is produced from para-tyramine by phenylethanolamine N-methyltransferase (PNMT) in the human brain.

== Chemistry ==
=== Synthesis ===
NMT has been synthesized in a number of ways. One of the earliest syntheses is that reported by Walpole, who made it by the following sequence of steps: (i) acetylation of 4-methoxyphenethylamine with acetic anhydride; (ii) methylation of the amide using Na/methyl iodide; (iii) cleavage of the methyl ether to the phenol using HI; (iv) hydrolysis of the N-acetyl group with aqueous HCl. Walpole also described an alternative, but similar sequence of reactions leading to NMT, beginning with the conversion of 4-methoxyphenethylamine to its benzenesulfonamide, which was then N-methylated and de-protected.

A different method for making NMT was given by Corti, who prepared it by the thermal decarboxylation of N-methyltyrosine (ratanhin), by heating the amino-acid in fluorene at 250 °C. Although N-methyltyrosine occurs naturally, it was made by the methylation of tyrosine using dimethyl sulfate.

NMT was also made by Kirkwood and Marion starting from 4-methoxyphenethylamine, but this was first converted to the imine with benzaldehyde, followed by methylation with dimethyl sulfate; the product was converted to N-methyl-4-methoxyphenethylamine, and finally de-O-methylated with HBr to give N-methyltyramine.

=== Common Salts ===
N-methyltyramine hydrochloride, C_{9}H_{13}NO.HCl: m.p. 148.5 °C; highly soluble in water and in ethanol.

N-methyltyramine hydrogen oxalate, C_{9}H_{13}NO.C_{2}H_{2}O_{4}: m.p. 250 °C; very poorly soluble in water.

=== Basicity ===
The apparent (see original article for discussion) pK_{a}s for protonated N-methyltyramine are 9.76 (phenolic H) and 10.71 (ammonium H).

== Pharmacology ==
NMT is a pressor, with a potency of 1/140 × epinephrine. On the basis of experiments using dogs, Hjort described NMT as a "very good pressor agent": a blood pressure rise of >130 mm and ~ 5 minutes duration was produced by the injection of 1-2.5 μM of solutions of the HCl salt into dogs weighing ~ 10 kg. A pressor response, which was inhibited by pre-treatment with reserpine, to the administration of NMT to goats was reported by Camp.

Subcutaneous administration of 10 mg/kg of the HCl salt of NMT to mice enhanced the release of norepinephrine (NE) from the heart by 36% over control, measured after 2 hours. For comparison, the same dose of tyramine hydrochloride caused a release of NE of 50% over control in this assay. A qualitatively similar decrease in the NE content of rat heart after treatment with NMT was observed by Camp.

Without giving many experimental details, Evans et al. reported that NMT increased blood pressure in rats, inhibited electrically-induced contractions of the guinea-pig ileum, relaxed acetylcholine-stimulated tone of isolated guinea-pig trachealis muscle, and increased the rate and contractile force of isolated guinea-pig atrium. The effect on blood pressure was competitively-antagonized by guanethidine, while the effects on the isolated atrium were inhibited by desipramine. Although doses were not given, NMT was described as being equipotent with tyramine on all tissues. It was also noted that the handling of NMT caused migraine headaches in one of the researchers.

NMT has been found to be a potent stimulant of gastrin release in the rat, with an [[ED_{50}]] of ~ 10 μg/kg. These researchers used a bio-assay-guided isolation procedure to show that NMT was the constituent of beer that was responsible for producing enhanced gastrin release, which in turn raises gastric acid secretion. For comparative purposes, they also tested tyramine and N,N-dimethyltyramine (hordenine) in their assay, finding that 83 nM/kg (corresponding to 12.5 μg/kg of NMT) of each compound enhanced gastrin release by ~ 58% for NMT, ~ 24% for tyramine, and ~ 60% for hordenine.

In order to test the indications from earlier studies that, like tyramine itself, NMT produced most of its pharmacological effects by stimulating norepinephrine (NE) release, Koda and co-workers investigated the action of NMT on α_{2} adrenoceptors, which are involved in the regulation of NE. These researchers found that NMT competed with the binding of [^{3}H]-p-aminoclonidine to α_{2} receptors from rat brain with an IC_{50} of ~5.5 × 10^{−6}M. In common with other α_{2} antagonists, NMT, at i.p. doses of 20 or 100 mg/kg, was also found to inhibit the hypermotility induced in mice by (−)-scopolamine in a dose-dependent manner. The same doses of NMT in the absence of scopolamine had no significant effects on locomotor activity in mice.

Since NMT is one of the constituents of bitter orange, Citrus aurantium, Mercader and co-workers studied its effects on lipolysis, finding that it inhibited lipolysis in rats. NMT (in common with tyramine) also failed to stimulate lipolysis in human adipocytes at a concentration of 10 μg/mL (i.e. ~ 66 μM/L); even at ≥ 100 μg/mL, NMT and tyramine induced only 20% of the lipolysis produced by the reference standard drug, isoprenaline.

NMT is a competitive substrate for MAO.

It is known to be a stimulator of pancreatic secretions in rats.

NMT has been shown to be an agonist of the TAAR1, similarly to its parent compound tyramine. The EC_{50} of NMT on the human TAAR1 receptor was ~ 2 μM, compared to ~ 1 μM for tyramine.

== Pharmacokinetics ==
The pharmacokinetics of NMT have been studied in rabbits and mice using drug that had been radiolabeled with tritium at C-3 and C-5 on the benzene ring. Plasma concentrations were measured in the rabbits, whereas distribution, metabolism and excretion were determined in the mice. After i.v. administration to rabbits, the α-phase T_{1/2} was found to be 0.3 minutes, and the β-phase T_{1/2} was 5.6 minutes. These figures were indicative of a rapid distribution from blood to tissue and a very short plasma half-life. Within 2 minutes of injection, significant levels of radioactivity were detected in all tissues examined, with the highest amounts being in kidney and liver. No detectable radioactivity was left in the plasma after 30 minutes. Some NMT was found in the brains of mice treated with the drug, indicating that a small amount did cross the blood–brain barrier. ~ 80% of the administered dose was recovered from the urine of mice within 1 hour.

== Toxicology ==
LD_{50} of HCl salt of NMT (mouse; i.p.) = 227 mg/kg. Another acute toxicity study of NMT (under the Sterling-Winthrop company code "WIN 5582") found it to have an LD_{50} = 275 mg/kg, after intravenous administration to mice.

== See also ==
- Tyramine
- Octopamine
- Epinine
- N-Methylphenethylamine
- Hordenine
- Candicine
