= C17H25NO4 =

The molecular formula C_{17}H_{25}NO_{4} (molar mass: 307.38 g/mol, exact mass: 307.1784 u) may refer to:

- Ibopamine
- Buflomedil
