= Dimethyldopamine =

Dimethyldopamine may refer to:

- N,N-Dimethyldopamine
- O,O-Dimethyldopamine
