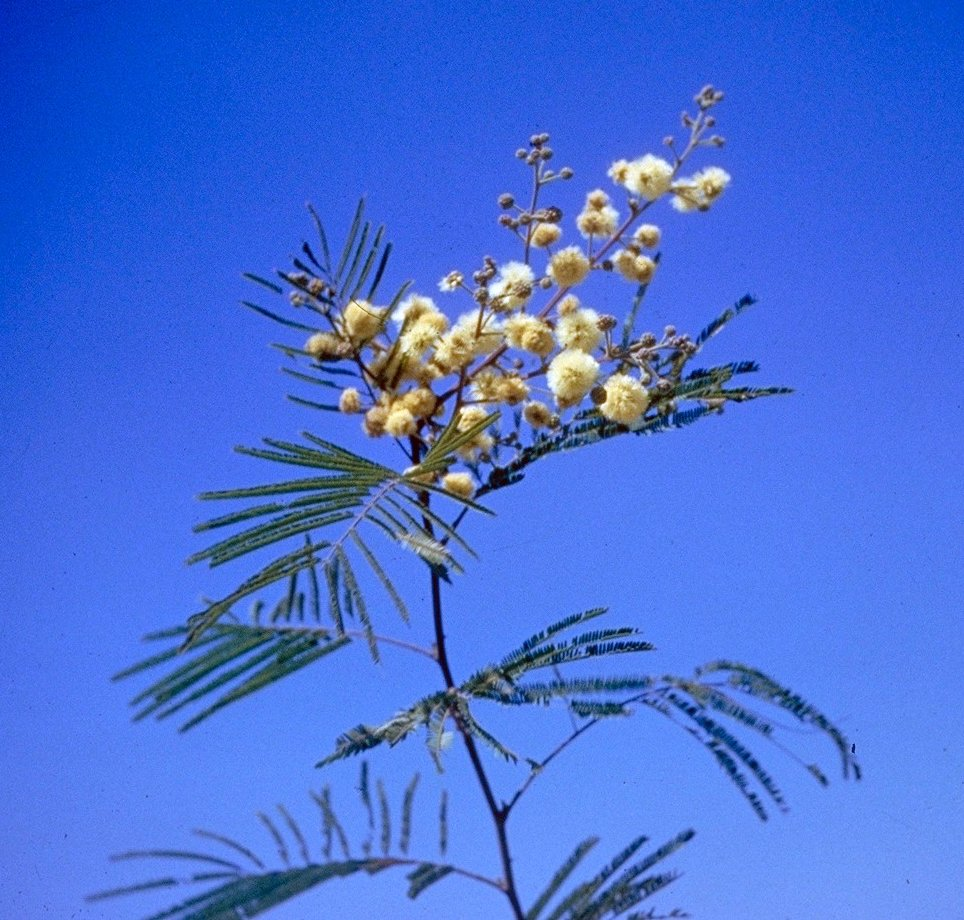

Conservation status
- Apparently Secure (NatureServe)

Scientific classification
- Kingdom: Plantae
- Clade: Embryophytes
- Clade: Tracheophytes
- Clade: Spermatophytes
- Clade: Angiosperms
- Clade: Eudicots
- Clade: Rosids
- Order: Fabales
- Family: Fabaceae
- Subfamily: Caesalpinioideae
- Clade: Mimosoid clade
- Genus: Senegalia
- Species: S. berlandieri

Binomial name
- Senegalia berlandieri (Benth.) Britton & Rose
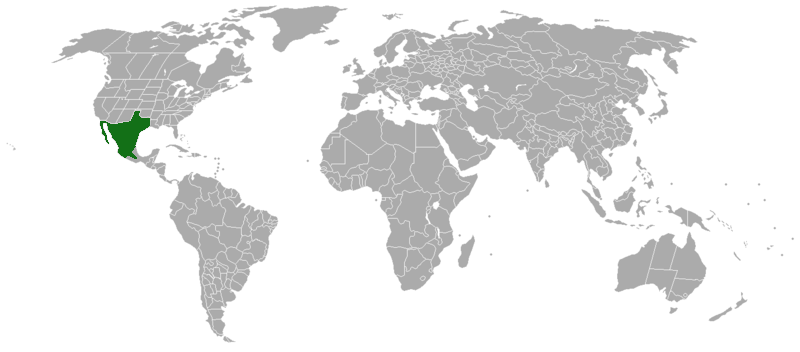
- Range of Senegalia berlandieri

Synonyms
- Acacia berlandieri Benth.

= Senegalia berlandieri =

Species of plant

Senegalia berlandieri (Berlandier acacia, guajillo acacia, guajillo, huajillo, huajilla) is a shrub native to the Southwestern United States and northeast Mexico that belongs to the Mimosoid clade of Fabaceae. It grows 1 to 5 metres (3.3 to 16.4 ft) tall, with blossoms that are spherical and white, occurring from February through April. The berlandieri epithet comes from the name of Jean-Louis Berlandier, a French naturalist who studied wildlife native to Texas and Mexico. S. berlandieri contains a wide variety of alkaloids and has been known to cause toxic reactions in domestic animals such as goats.

== Uses ==
Senegalia berlandieri is toxic to livestock and thus should not be used as forage or fodder.

== Alkaloids ==
Senegalia berlandieri contains a diverse range of alkaloids, the most plentiful of which are N-methylphenethylamine, tyramine, and phenethylamine. The total alkaloid content in dried leaves has been reported to be in the range 0.28-0.66%.

Four phenolic amines (N-methyl-β-phenethylamine, tyramine, N-methyltyramine, and hordenine) have been detected.

Other trace alkaloids include nicotine and mescaline (the latter of which is found in many cacti but infrequently in other plants). The same group of researchers later reported finding most of the same alkaloids in Acacia rigidula, a related species also native to the Southwestern U.S. However, their findings have not been corroborated by other research, leading to the suggestion that they may have resulted from cross-contamination or simply been artifacts of the researchers' analytical technique.

== Illicit use in supplements ==
After the FDA declared that the use of Acacia rigdula was unlawful in supplements (because of frequent adulteration with synthetic drugs), many supplement sellers began replacing previously reported 'rigdula' containing supplements with Acacia berlandieri. Some of these products declare their Acacia extracts as containing Methylsynephrine, an entirely synthetic drug that has never been found in nature.

== Gallery ==
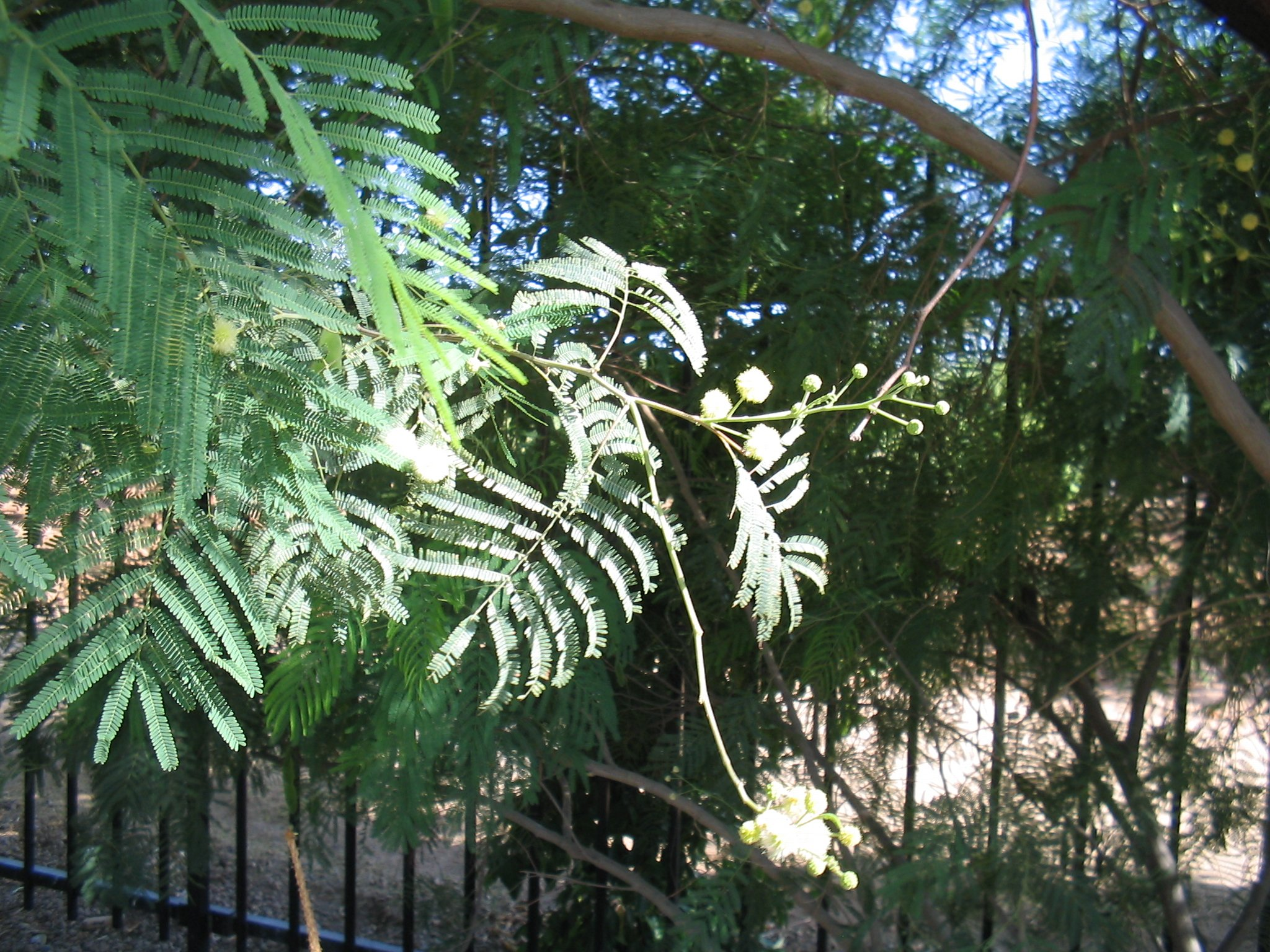
Senegalia berlandieri foliage and flowers

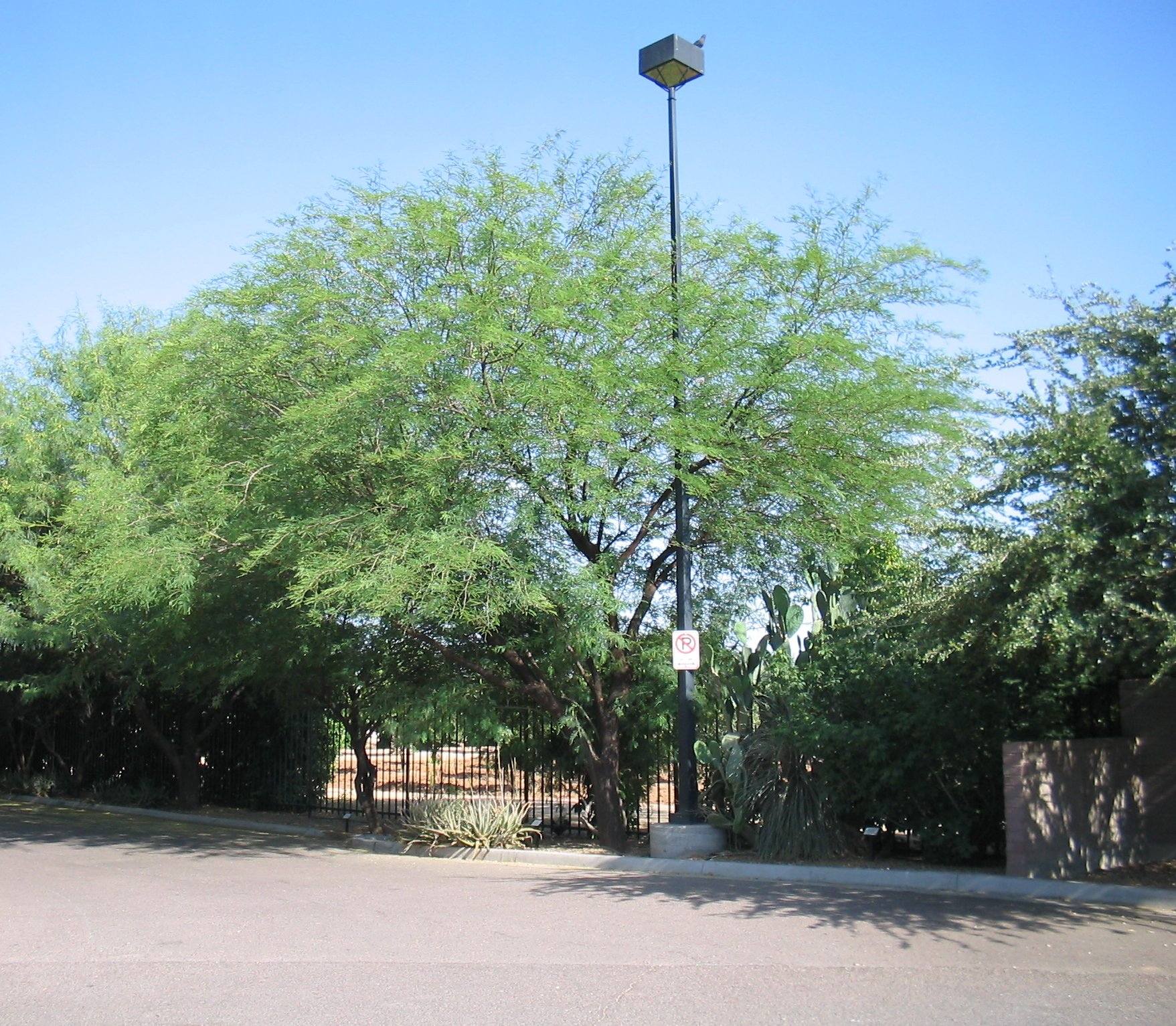
Senegalia berlandieri tree

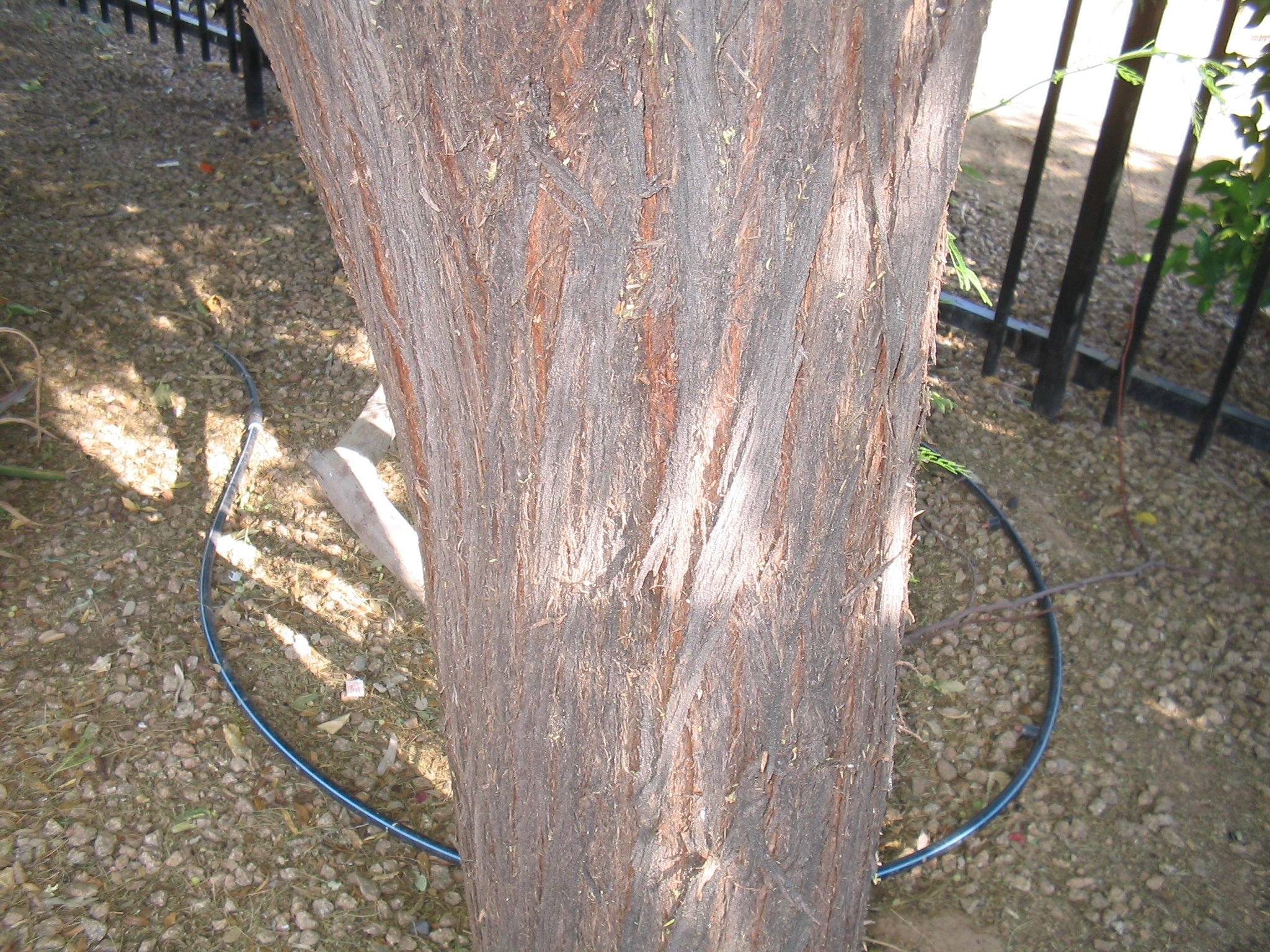
Senegalia berlandieri bark

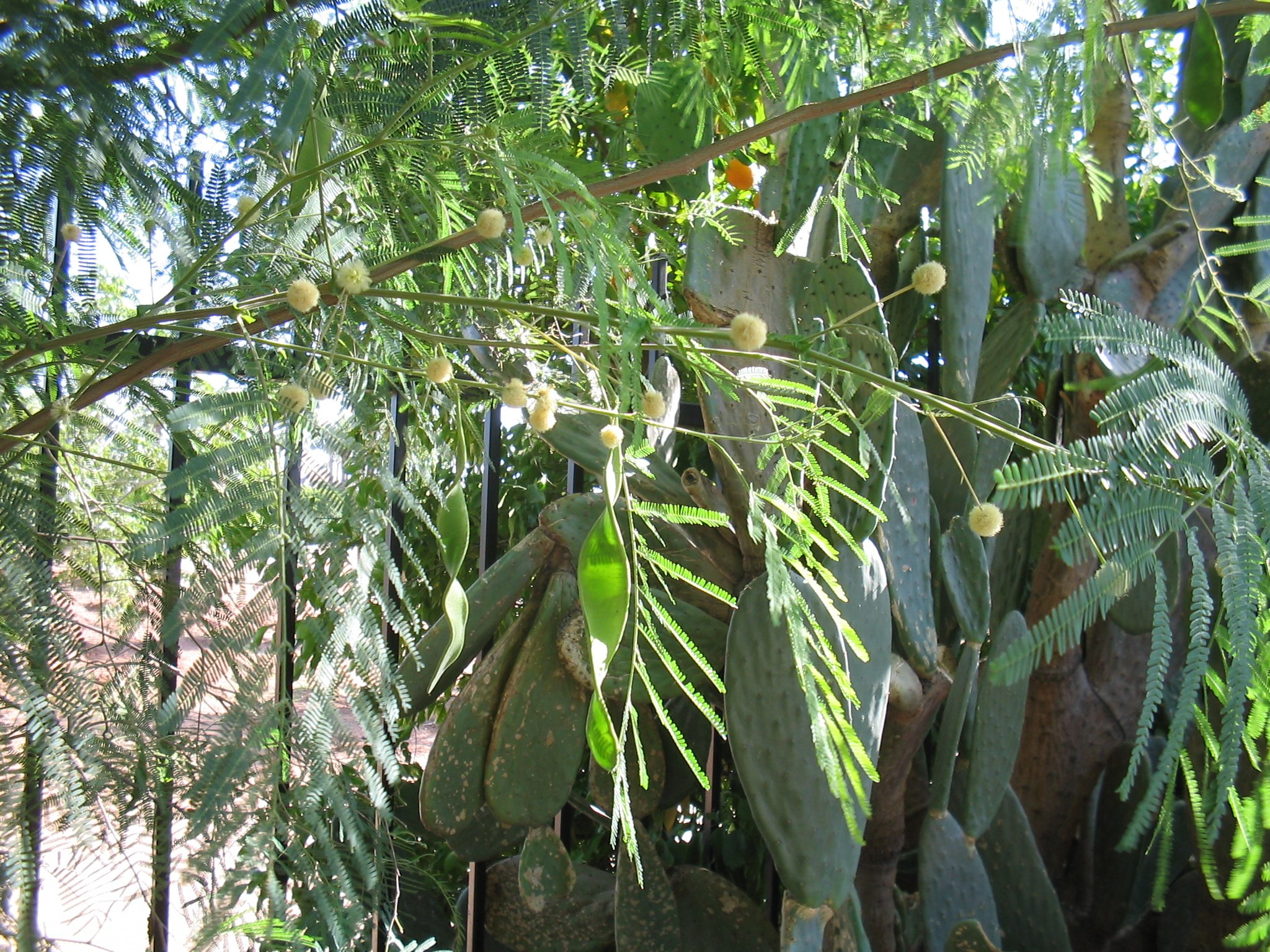
Senegalia berlandieri flowers and seed pods

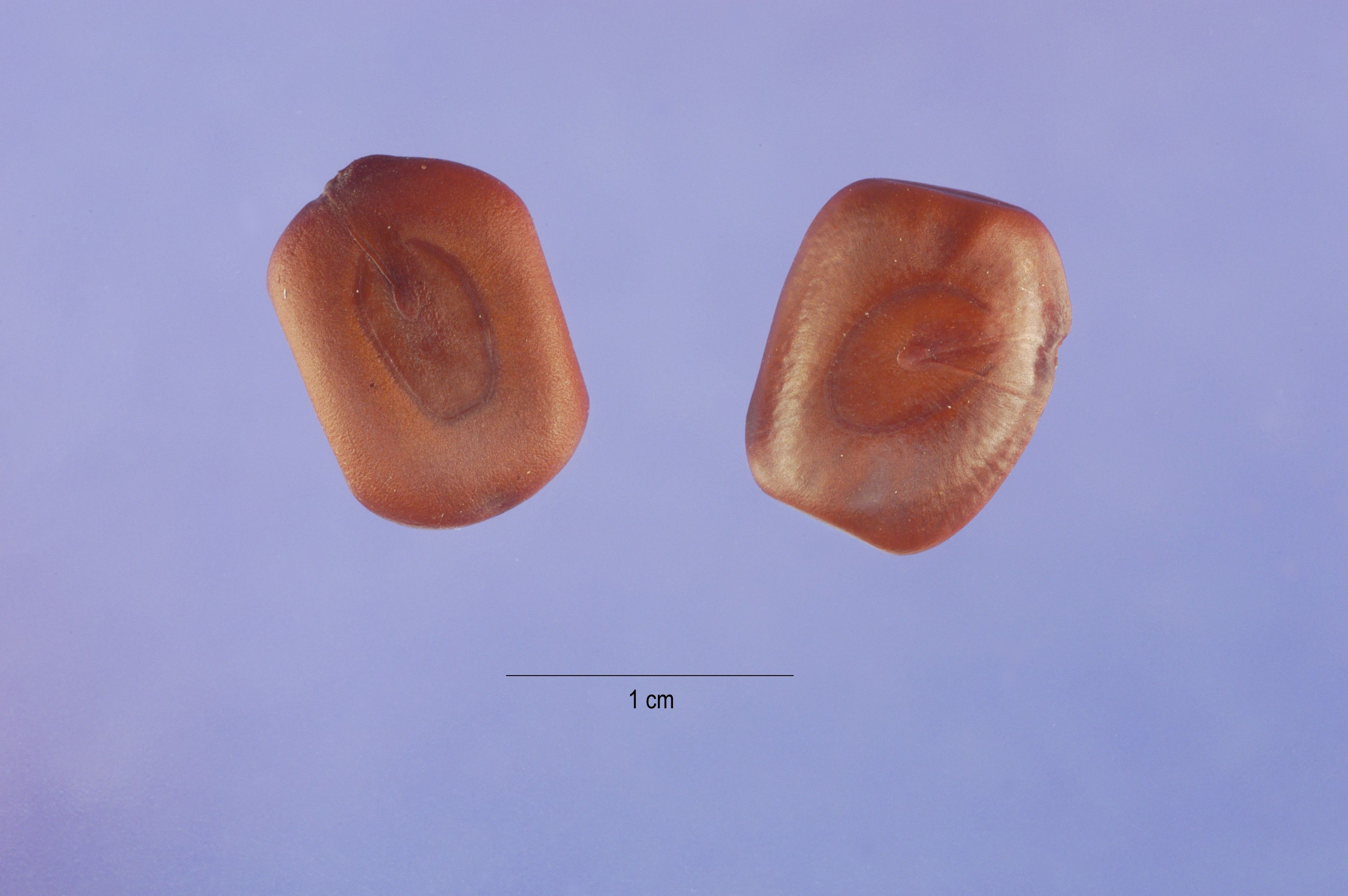
Senegalia berlandieri seeds
