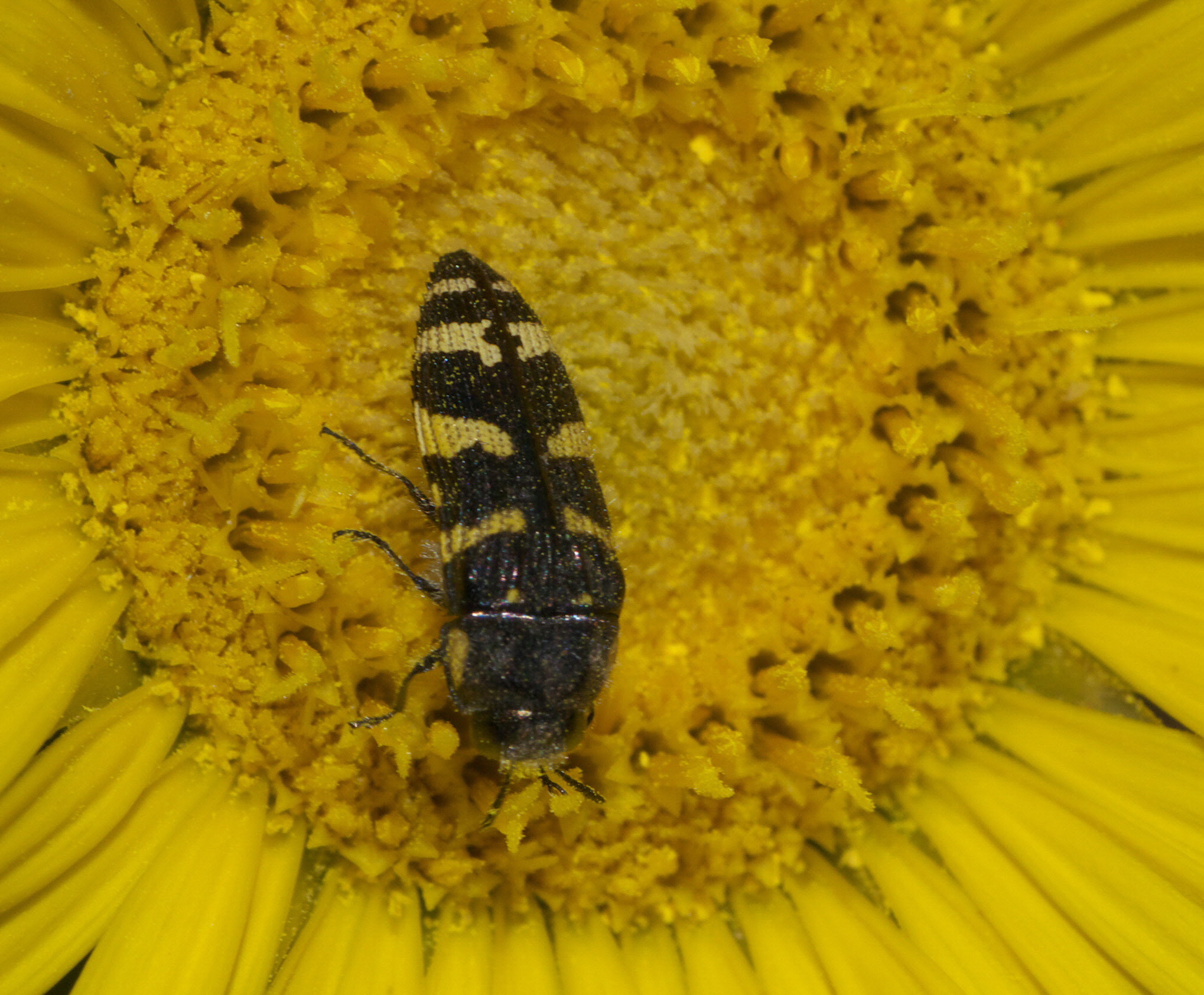

Scientific classification
- Kingdom: Animalia
- Phylum: Arthropoda
- Class: Insecta
- Order: Coleoptera
- Suborder: Polyphaga
- Infraorder: Elateriformia
- Family: Buprestidae
- Genus: Acmaeodera
- Species: A. macra

Binomial name
- Acmaeodera macra Horn, 1878

= Acmaeodera macra =

Species of beetle

Acmaeodera macra is a species of metallic wood-boring beetle in the family Buprestidae. It is found in North America. It can be found on Senegalia berlandieri and Verbesina encelioides plants.

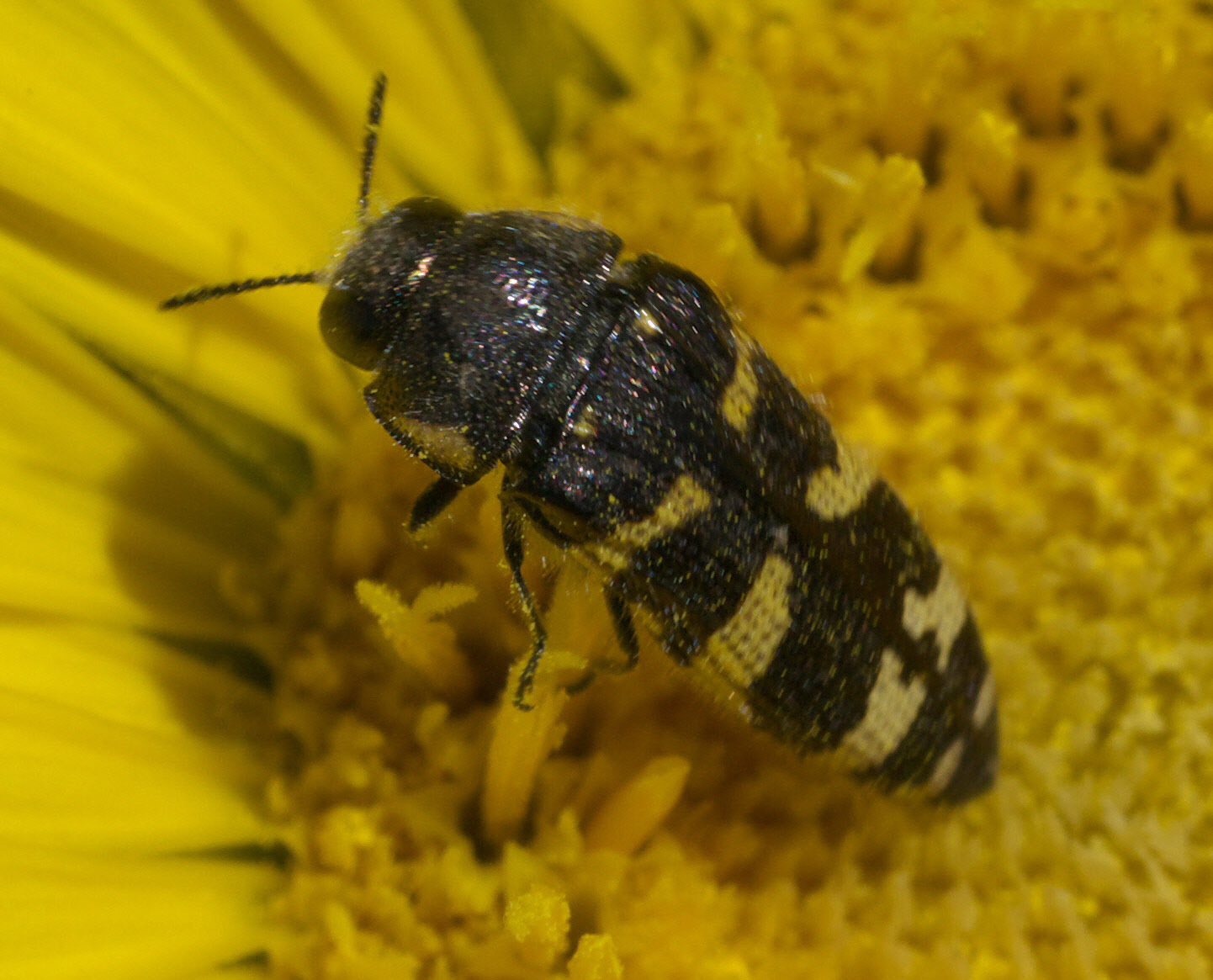
