= Tyramine N-feruloyltransferase =

tyramine N-feruloyltransferase

Identifiers
- EC no.: 2.3.1.110
- CAS no.: 95567-96-7

Databases
- IntEnz: IntEnz view
- BRENDA: BRENDA entry
- ExPASy: NiceZyme view
- KEGG: KEGG entry
- MetaCyc: metabolic pathway
- PRIAM: profile
- PDB structures: RCSB PDB PDBe PDBsum
- Gene Ontology: AmiGO / QuickGO
Search
- PMC: articles
- PubMed: articles
- NCBI: proteins

In enzymology, a tyramine N-feruloyltransferase (EC 2.3.1.110) is an enzyme that catalyzes the chemical reaction

feruloyl-CoA + tyramine $\rightleftharpoons$ CoA + N-feruloyltyramine

Thus, the two substrates of this enzyme are feruloyl-CoA and tyramine, whereas its two products are CoA and N-feruloyltyramine.

This enzyme belongs to the family of transferases, specifically those acyltransferases transferring groups other than aminoacyl groups. The systematic name of this enzyme class is feruloyl-CoA:tyramine N-(hydroxycinnamoyl)transferase. Other names in common use include tyramine N-feruloyl-CoA transferase, feruloyltyramine synthase, feruloyl-CoA tyramine N-feruloyl-CoA transferase, and tyramine feruloyltransferase.
