= Candicine =

Names
- Preferred IUPAC name 2-(4-Hydroxyphenyl)-N,N,N-trimethylethan-1-aminium
- Other names 2-(4-Hydroxyphenyl)-N,N,N-trimethylethanaminium; Maltoxin; N,N,N-Trimethyltyramine

Identifiers
CAS Number	3761-58-8
3D model (JSmol)	Interactive image
ChemSpider	21647
PubChem CID	23135
UNII	TL3035N52J
CompTox Dashboard (EPA)	DTXSID80901642
- InChI: InChI=1S/C11H17NO/c1-12(2,3)9-8-10-4-6-11(13)7-5-10/h4-7H,8-9H2,1-3H3/p+1 Key: PTOJXIKSKSASRB-UHFFFAOYSA-O; InChI=1/C11H17NO/c1-12(2,3)9-8-10-4-6-11(13)7-5-10/h4-7H,8-9H2,1-3H3/p+1 Key: PTOJXIKSKSASRB-IKLDFBCSAB
- SMILES: Oc1ccc(cc1)CC[N+](C)(C)C

Properties
Chemical formula	C_{11}H_{18}NO^{+}, HOC_{6}H_{4}(CH_{2})_{2}N(CH_{3})_{3}^{+}
Molar mass	180.266205 Da (+ 126.90447, if iodide)
Appearance	colorless solid (chloride and iodide salts)
Melting point	234 °C (453 °F; 507 K) (iodide); 285 °C (decomposition of chloride)
Solubility in water	Iodide and chloride are both highly soluble in water

Hazards
- Occupational safety and health (OHS/OSH)
Main hazards	Irritant
- Except where otherwise noted, data are given for materials in their standard state (at 25 °C [77 °F], 100 kPa). Infobox references

Candicine, also known as N,N,N-trimethyltyramine, is a naturally occurring organic compound that is a quaternary ammonium salt with a phenethylamine skeleton. It is the N,N,N-trimethyl derivative of the well-known biogenic amine tyramine, and, being a natural product with a positively charged nitrogen atom in its molecular structure, it is classed as an alkaloid. Although it is found in a variety of plants, including barley, its properties have not been extensively studied with modern techniques. Candicine is toxic after parenteral administration, producing symptoms of neuromuscular blockade; further details are given in the "Pharmacology" section below.

== Occurrence ==
Candicine occurs in a variety of plants, notably the cacti. This alkaloid was first isolated from the Argentinian cactus Trichocereus candicans (now reclassified as Echinopsis candicans), from which it derives its name, and from other Trichocereus species. T. candicans may contain up to 5% candicine, and is also a rich source of the closely related alkaloid hordenine.

Candicine also occurs in several plants of genus Citrus.

In the late 1950s, Japanese researchers isolated a toxic compound which they named "maltoxin" from malted barley. After the publication of some papers on its pharmacology (see "Pharmacology" section), under this name, it was determined that maltoxin was identical to candicine, and the older name has been retained in subsequent articles.

Candicine has also been found in the skin of the frog, Leptodactylus pentadactylus pentadactylus, at a concentration of 45 μg/g skin, but it is of much more limited occurrence amongst amphibians than its positional isomer, leptodactyline.

== Chemistry ==
The dominant chemical characteristics of candicine are that it is a quaternary ammonium salt and a phenol. The quaternary ammonium cation is found in association with different anions, forming the corresponding salts, the commonest of which are the iodide and chloride, trivially named "candicine iodide" (or "hordenine methiodide") and "candicine chloride". Since it is impractical to isolate candicine from a natural source along with its original counterion(s), isolation procedures are designed so as to obtain it in association with a particular anion chosen by the investigator. The name "candicine" when used alone is thus not unequivocally chemically defined.

The presence of the phenolic group would make aqueous solutions of candicine salts weakly acidic, but no pKa seems to have been recorded. This phenolic group has been converted to the methyl ether by treatment of candicine with methyl iodide, to make O-methyl candicine iodide.

=== Synthesis ===
One of the earliest syntheses of candicine is that of Barger, who made candicine iodide by the N-methylation of hordenine, using methyl iodide. This method has become a standard one for the conversion of tertiary amines to quaternary salts. It was used again by Buck and co-workers, who also reported the conversion of candicine iodide to candicine chloride by treatment with AgCl.

== Pharmacology ==
The earliest pharmacological studies on candicine (under the name of hordenine methiodide) appear to be those of Barger and Dale, who studied its effects primarily in cats and isolated animal organ preparations. These researchers found candicine to closely resemble nicotine in its effects. For example, contractions of isolated sections of rabbit jejunum were produced by ~ 2 × 10^{−5}M concentrations of the drug; 1 mg of candicine iodide given i.v. to cats produced the same rise in blood pressure as 0.5 mg nicotine; toxic doses produced respiratory paralysis. It was observed that in the same blood pressure assay, candicine iodide was about twice as potent as its structural analog tyramine, and much more potent than its even-closer analog, hordenine.

After Reti's discovery (and naming) of candicine as a natural product, a series of pharmacological investigations was carried out on this alkaloid by Luduena. These are summarized in Reti's review: as before, the similarity of effects between candicine and nicotine was noted. In Luduena's experiments, candicine first stimulated, then blocked ganglionic transmission; its effects were not altered by yohimbine, cocaine, or atropine, but completely counteracted by sparteine or tetrapropylammonium iodide. No muscarinic action was seen. Doses of 6 mg/kg were curare-like in the dog; similar effects were also observed in the toad, Bufo arenarum.

Candicine (as either the iodide or chloride) was re-investigated by Japanese pharmacologists in the early 1960s. Initial experiments on frogs, using rectus muscle and nerve-sartorius preparations from Rana nigromaculata nigromaculata, showed that the alkaloid caused contractions in the rectus at concentrations of 0.01–0.2 mg/mL, and blocked the response of the nerve-sartorius to direct or indirect electrical stimulation at similar concentrations. The contraction of the rectus was inhibited by pre-treatment with tubocurarine, as was the response of the nerve-sartorius (i.e., the normal muscle twitch was not reduced by the application of candicine subsequent to tubocurarine). The action of candicine in these assays was not affected by eserine. Taking additional observations into account, these researchers concluded that the effects on frog tissue of candicine most closely resembled those of the well-known depolarizing neuromuscular-blocking drug decamethonium. An earlier comparison of 0.2 mg of candicine chloride with 2 mg of hordenine sulfate on the rectus muscle preparation showed that hordenine was much less potent at eliciting a contraction, even at 10× the concentration of candicine.

Following their experiments on frogs, the Japanese group carried out a series of classical pharmacological investigations of candicine on cats and rabbits, and on various isolated animal organs/tissues. In rabbits, doses of 0.6 mg/kg, i.v., of candicine produced respiratory and cardiovascular disturbances lasting about 15 minutes. Body temperature was not affected; there was also mydriasis followed by miosis, and hypersalivation. In rabbits, i.v. doses of 2.1 mg/kg produced apnea, followed by death. In anesthetized cats, doses of 0.06–0.12 mg/kg, iv., also caused respiratory and cardiovascular disturbances: although the details were concentration-and time-dependent, the ultimate effects were ones of sustained respiratory stimulation and elevated blood pressure; the hypertension was not inhibited by atropine, but was antagonized by hexamethonium. Candicine caused contraction of the cat nictitating membrane. A concentration of 0.012 mg/mL applied to the isolated guinea pig atrium caused a decrease in the amplitude and rate of contractions, these effects being enhanced by eserine, but inhibited by atropine pre-treatment. Concentrations of 3-6 μg/mL produced contractions of the isolated guinea pig ileum which were inhibited by pre-treatment with atropine, hexamethonium, tubocurarine or cocaine, but were not affected by the presence of pyribenzamine or chlorpheniramine. Summarizing the results of these and other observations, the authors concluded that: candicine was primarily a stimulant of autonomic ganglia; it liberated catecholamines from the adrenal medulla; it showed muscarine-like and sympathomimetic effects in some assays, and it was a neuromuscular blocker of the depolarizing type. In many of these respects, candicine resembled nicotine and dimethylphenylpiperazinium (DMPP).

== Toxicology ==
LD_{50} = 10 mg/kg (mouse; s.c.); LD_{50} = 36 mg/kg (mouse; i.p.); LD_{50} = 50 mg/kg (rat).

== Effects on Plants ==
Candicine iodide has some plant growth-inhibiting properties: 50 μg/plant of the salt produced 76-100% inhibition of elongation of the second internode in beans, with indications of necrosis; ~ 100 μg of candicine iodide applied to the roots of sorghum seedlings caused a 50% inhibition in overall plant length.

== Effects on Brine Shrimp ==
The LC_{50} for candicine chloride in the brine shrimp bioassay is 923 μg/mL.

== See also ==
- Tyramine
- N-Methyltyramine
- Hordenine
