= Tyramine N-methyltransferase =

Class of enzymes

Identifiers
- EC no.: 2.1.1.27
- CAS no.: 37256-96-5

Databases
- BRENDA: enzyme data
- ExPASy: NiceZyme view
- KEGG: enzyme entry
- MetaCyc: metabolic pathway
- Rhea: reactions
- PDB structures: RCSB PDB PDBe PDBsum
- Gene Ontology: AmiGO / QuickGO
Search
- PMC: articles
- PubMed: articles
- NCBI: proteins

Tyramine N-methyltransferase (EC 2.1.1.27) is an enzyme that catalyzes the chemical reaction

tyramine
+ SAM
N-Methyltyramine
+ SAH

This is a methylation reaction in which tyramine is converted to N-methyltyramine. The methyl group comes from the cofactor, S-adenosyl methionine (SAM), which loses its methyl group and becomes S-adenosyl-L-homocysteine (SAH).

The enzyme belongs to the family of transferases, specifically those transferring one-carbon group methyltransferases. The systematic name of this enzyme class is S-adenosyl-L-methionine:tyramine N-methyltransferase. Other names in common use include DIB O-methyltransferase (3,5-diiodo-4-hydroxy-benzoic acid), S-adenosyl-methionine:tyramine N-methyltransferase, and tyramine methylpherase. This enzyme participates in tyrosine metabolism.
