= N,N-Dimethyldopamine =

Names
- Preferred IUPAC name 4-[2-(Dimethylamino)ethyl]benzene-1,2-diol

Identifiers
CAS Number	21581-37-3
3D model (JSmol)	Interactive image
ChemSpider	134342
PubChem CID	152427
UNII	I5R8511L9N
CompTox Dashboard (EPA)	DTXSID00175944
- InChI: InChI=1S/C10H15NO2/c1-11(2)6-5-8-3-4-9(12)10(13)7-8/h3-4,7,12-13H,5-6H2,1-2H3 Key: XJTVXBWTYZCUJX-UHFFFAOYSA-N
- SMILES: CN(C)CCC1=CC(=C(C=C1)O)O

Properties
Chemical formula	C_{10}H_{15}NO_{2}
Molar mass	181.235 g·mol^{−1}
Appearance	colorless
- Except where otherwise noted, data are given for materials in their standard state (at 25 °C [77 °F], 100 kPa). Infobox references

N,N-Dimethyldopamine (DMDA) is an organic compound belonging to the phenethylamine family. It is related structurally to the alkaloid epinine (N-methyldopamine) and to the major neurotransmitter dopamine (of which it is the N,N-dimethylated analog). Because of its structural relationship to dopamine, DMDA has been the subject of a number of pharmacological investigations. DMDA has been detected in Acacia rigidula.

== Occurrence ==
DMDA has been reported from the plant Acacia rigidula Benth. (Fabaceae), in which it has been detected at levels of ~ 11-45 ppm.

== Chemistry ==
Since N,N-dimethyldopamine is chemically an amine, it is basic (a weak base, technically), but it is also a catechol (a 1,2-dihydroxybenzene), which gives it weakly acidic properties, so that the compound is amphoteric.

=== Preparation ===
Several different methods have been reported for the preparation of DMDA. An early synthesis by Buck and co-workers began with 3,4-dimethoxybenzaldehyde (veratraldehyde), which was condensed with hippuric acid to give the azlactone; this was hydrolyzed with NaOH to the corresponding pyruvic acid, which was then converted to its oxime; treatment of the oxime with acetic anhydride gave 3,4-dimethoxyphenylacetonitrile, which was catalytically reduced (H_{2}/Pd) in the presence of excess dimethylamine to N,N-dimethyl-3,4-dimethoxyphenethylamine; finally, the methoxy-groups were cleaved with HCl to give DMDA as its hydrochloride salt.

A more recent method starts with 3,4-dimethoxyphenylacetic acid, which is converted to its acid chloride with thionyl chloride; this is reacted with dimethylamine to give the dimethylamide, which is then reduced using diborane to N,N-dimethyl 3,4-dimethoxyphenethylamine; the methoxy- groups are finally cleaved with hydriodic acid to give DMDA.

The shortest method is that of Borgman et al., who converted 3,4-dimethoxyphenethylamine into N,N-dimethyl 3,4-dimethoxyphenethylamine by catalytic reduction (H_{2}/Pd) in the presence of formaldehyde; the methoxy-groups were then cleaved with hydrobromic acid.

== Pharmacology ==
One of the earliest pharmacological studies of DMDA was that of Daly and his co-workers, who studied the ability of a large number of substituted phenethylamines to release norepinephrine (NE) from the mouse heart. In this assay, a subcutaneous dose of 10 mg/kg of DMDA hydrochloride (referred to as "3,4-dihydroxy-N,N-dimethylphenethylamine HCl") failed to produce a significant change in the NE content of the heart. In comparison, a dose of 5 mg/kg, s.c., of N-methyldopamine ("3,4-dihydroxy-N-methylphenethylamine HCl") caused a 45% reduction in the NE content, while dopamine HCl itself caused a 50% decrease at a dose of 5 mg/kg, s.c.

Another early pharmacological investigation of DMDA was carried out by Goldberg and co-workers, who examined the effects of a range of phenethylamine analogs in an assay based on the vasodilation produced by injection of the test drug into the renal artery of the dog. In this assay, a drug was classed as "dopamine-like" if the vasoldilation it produced was not prevented by β-blocking drugs, and did not occur if the drug was injected into the femoral artery. Although DMDA, at a dose of 0.5 mg, caused a marked bradycardia, a dose of ~ 0.75 mg did not increase renal blood flow (i.e. cause vasodilation) after administration of atropine to abolish the bradycardia.

In cats pretreated with atropine and hexamethonium, DMDA is a strong vasopressor: a parenteral dose of 10 μg/kg produced a rise in blood pressure more than twice that produced by the same dose of dopamine. In an assay based on the increase in heart rate (positive chronotropic response) produced by electrical stimulation of the post-ganglionic fibers of cat cardioaccelerator nerve, an i.v. dose of ~ 15 μg/kg DMDA caused a 50% reduction of the response, compared to an approximately 10% decrease produced by the same dose of dopamine. From these and other related observations, the researchers concluded that DMDA was a potent inhibitor of the adrenergic system via stimulation of inhibitory putative (at that time) dopamine receptors on adrenergic nerve terminals.

In the dog, an i.v. dose of 16 μg/kg caused an ~ 80% decrease in heart rate in the same cardioaccelerator nerve assay, compared to an ~ 8% decrease produced by dopamine. DMDA caused vasoconstriction in several isolated vascular preparations from the rabbit. The pressor activity of DMDA was partially inhibited by the α-antagonist phentolamine. From these and other observations, the investigators concluded that there were significant species-related differences between the responses to DMDA of dogs and cats, with adrenergic effects being predominant in dogs.

Ginos et al. tested DMDA for effects in unilaterally-caudectomized mice (dose ≤ 120 mg/kg, i.p.), nigral-lesioned rats (dose = 10 mg/kg, i.p.), and on adenylate cyclase activity in homogenized mouse caudate nuclei (concentration = 10μM/L). DMDA showed no effects in any of these assay systems. By comparison, N-methyldopamine also had no effect in caudectomized mice at ≤ 150 mg/kg, and only a weak effect in nigral-lesioned rats at 25 mg/kg, although it was as effective as dopamine in stimulating cAMP in the adenylate cyclase assay.

Borgman and co-workers reported in 1973 that at 100 mg/kg, given i.p. to mice, DMDA failed to antagonize the tremor and reduction in locomotor activity produced by pre-administration of oxotremorine. In another assay, 6 mg/kg of DMDA (i.p. in mice) only slightly antagonized the reduced locomotor activity resulting from pre-treatment with reserpine. A dose of 1 mg/kg, iv., of DMDA did not produce any hypothermia in mice.

It has been stated that dopamine is behaviorally inactive due to its rapid peripheral metabolism and inability to cross the blood–brain barrier. When dopamine or N-methyldopamine were injected directly into the nucleus accumbens of mice, however, doses of 12.5-50 μg produced marked hyperactivity, with the latter being somewhat more potent. In contrast, DMDA did not produce any hyperactivity in doses up to 100 μg.

In a 1981 paper, Costall and co-workers reported that DMDA, in doses of 0.5–8 mg/kg given i.p. to mice, produced a dose-dependent reduction in spontaneous motor activity (occurring within a 20 minute period after drug administration). They also observed piloerection at 2 mg/kg, and prostration accompanying the 8 mg/kg or higher doses. The effects of DMDA were not altered by the administration of spiroperidol.

Receptor binding studies, in competition with [^{3}H]-spiperone, using receptors from pig anterior pituitary, have revealed the following affinities for D_{2} receptors exhibited by DMDA: K_{a}^{high} = 20 nM; K_{a}^{low} = 10200 nM. In comparison, the corresponding affinities for N-methyldopamine are: 10.4 nM (high) and 3430 nM (low), while for dopamine they are 7.5 nM (high) and 4300 nM (low affinity state).

Similar receptor binding results were obtained when DMDA and DA were assayed using a receptor preparation from rat striatum: competition against [^{3}H]-spiperone gave affinity constants of ~ 25 nM (high affinity state) and ~ 724 nM (low) for DMDA, compared to ~ 10 nM (high) and ~ 354 nM (low) for dopamine. Both drugs were also tested for their ability to inhibit the [^{3}H]-ACh release from mouse striatal slices evoked by K^{+}. In this assay, the ED_{50} for DMDA was ~ 0.06 μM, and for dopamine it was ~ 1.9 μM.

== Toxicity ==
The LD_{50} for N,N-dimethyldopamine·HCl is reported as 240 mg/kg (mouse, i.p.).; under the same experimental conditions, the LD_{50} for N-methyldopamine.HBr (epinine hydrobromide) is 212 mg/kg (mouse, i.p.), and the LD_{50} for dopamine·HCl is 1978 mg/kg (mouse, i.p.).

== See also ==
- Substituted phenethylamine
- Catecholamine
- N-Methyldopamine
- Dopamine
- Hordenine (N,N-dimethyltyramine)
- Trichocereine (N,N-dimethylmescaline)
