= Hordenine =

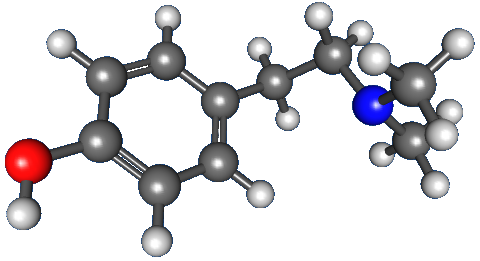

Clinical data
- Other names: N,N-Dimethyltyramine; Dimethyltyramine; 4-Hydroxy-N,N-dimethylphenethylamine; Peyocactin; Peyocactine; Anhalin; Anhaline; Eremursine; Gordenine
- Routes of administration: Oral
- Drug class: Norepinephrine releasing agent; Sympathomimetic; Stimulant
- ATC code: None

Identifiers
- IUPAC name: 4-[2-(dimethylamino)ethyl]phenol
- CAS Number: 539-15-1
- PubChem CID: 68313
- ChemSpider: 61609
- UNII: K3489CA082
- KEGG: C06199
- ChEBI: CHEBI:5764
- ChEMBL: ChEMBL505789
- CompTox Dashboard (EPA): DTXSID2046096
- ECHA InfoCard: 100.007.920

Chemical and physical data
- Formula: C_{10}H_{15}NO
- Molar mass: 165.236 g·mol^{−1}
- 3D model (JSmol): Interactive image
- Melting point: 116 to 117 °C (241 to 243 °F)
- Boiling point: 173 °C (343 °F) at 11 mm Hg; sublimes at 140–150 °C
- SMILES: Oc1ccc(cc1)CCN(C)C
- InChI: InChI=1S/C10H15NO/c1-11(2)8-7-9-3-5-10(12)6-4-9/h3-6,12H,7-8H2,1-2H3; Key:KUBCEEMXQZUPDQ-UHFFFAOYSA-N

Hordenine, also known as anhaline, peyocactin, N,N-dimethyltyramine or 4-hydroxy-N,N-dimethylphenethylamine, is an alkaloid of the phenethylamine family that occurs naturally in a variety of plants, taking its name from one of the most common, barley (Hordeum species). Chemically, hordenine is the N-methyl derivative of N-methyltyramine, and the N,N-dimethyl derivative of the well-known biogenic amine tyramine, from which it is biosynthetically derived and with which it shares some pharmacological properties. Like tyramine, hordenine acts as a norepinephrine releasing agent.

As of September 2012, hordenine is widely sold as an ingredient of supplements, with sellers claiming that it stimulates the central nervous system and promotes weight loss by enhancing metabolism. In experiments in which animals are given sufficiently large doses parenterally (by injection), hordenine produces an increase in blood pressure as well as other disturbances of the cardiovascular, respiratory, and nervous systems. These effects are generally not reproduced by oral administration of the drug in test animals, and virtually no scientific reports of the effects of hordenine in human beings have been published.

== Use and effects ==
Arthur Heffter tried hordenine at a dose of 100 mg and observed no detectable effects. Subsequent studies found that in doses of 200 to 500 mg, hordenine produces robust sympathomimetic effects, including vasoconstriction, bronchodilation, and pressor effects. Other sources have also stated hordenine to be a "stimulant".

== Toxicology ==
Working with Léger's hordenine sulfate, Camus determined minimum lethal doses for the dog, rabbit, guinea pig, and rat. The associated symptoms of toxicity following parenteral doses were: excitation, vomiting, respiratory difficulties, convulsions, and paralysis, with death occurring as a result of respiratory arrest. In a subsequent paper, Camus reported that the intravenous (IV) administration of some hundreds of mg of hordenine sulfate to dogs or rabbits caused an increase in blood pressure and changes in the rhythm and force of contraction of the heart, noting also that the drug was not orally active.

LD_{50} in mice, by intraperitoneal (IP) administration: 299 mg/kg. Other LD_{50} values given in the literature are: >100 mg/kg (mouse; IP), as HCl salt: 113.5 mg/kg (mouse; route of administration unspecified) Minimum lethal dose (as sulfate salt): 300 mg/kg (dog; IV); 2000 mg/kg (dog; oral); 250 mg/kg (rabbit; IV); 300 mg/kg (guinea pig; IV); 2000 mg/kg (guinea pig; subcutaneous); about 1000 mg/kg (rat; subcutaneous).

From experiments aimed at identifying the toxin responsible for producing the locomotor disorder ("staggers") and rapidly lethal cardiac toxicosis ("sudden death") periodically observed in livestock feeding on the grass Phalaris aquatica, Australian researchers determined that the lowest doses of hordenine that would induce symptoms of "staggers" in sheep were 20 mg/kg IV, and 800 mg/kg orally. However, the cardiac symptoms of "sudden death" could not be replicated by hordenine.

Although hordenine is capable of reacting with nitrosating agents (e.g. nitrite ion, NO_{2}^{−}) to form the carcinogen N-nitrosodimethylamine (NDMA), and was investigated as a possible precursor for the significant amounts of NDMA once found in beer, it was eventually established that the levels of hordenine present in malt were too low to account for the observed levels of NDMA.

== Pharmacology ==
=== Pharmacodynamics ===
The first pharmacological study of hordenine to be recorded is that of Arthur Heffter, who was also the first to isolate it. Using the sulfate salt, Heffter gave a subcutaneous dose of 0.3 g to a 2.8-kg cat (about 107 mg/kg), and observed no effects besides violent vomiting; the cat behaved normally within 45 minutes. The alkaloid was also observed to produce a paralysis of the nervous system in frogs.

The cardiovascular and other effects of hordenine were reviewed in detail by H. G. Reitschel, writing in 1937.

More modern studies were carried out by M. Frank and coworkers, who reported that intravenous administration of 2 mg/kg of hordenine to horses produced substantial respiratory distress, increased the rate of respiration by 250%, doubled the heart rate, and caused sweating without changes in basal body temperature or behavior. All effects disappeared within 30 minutes. The same dose of hordenine given orally did not produce any of the effects seen after parenteral administration.

In a 1995 study, H. J. Hapke and W. Strathmann reported that in dogs and rats, hordenine produced a positive inotropic effect on the heart (i.e. increased the strength of contraction), increased systolic and diastolic blood pressure, and increased the volume of peripheral blood flow. Movements of the gut were inhibited. Additional experiments on isolated tissue lead these investigators to conclude that hordenine was an indirectly acting adrenergic agent that produced its pharmacological effects by releasing stored norepinephrine (NE).

Hordenine was found to be a selective substrate for MAO-B, from rat liver, with K_{m} = 479 μM, and V_{max} = 128 nM/mg protein/h. It was not deaminated by MAO-A from rat intestinal epithelium.

In contrast to tyramine, hordenine did not produce contraction of isolated rat vas deferens, but a 25 μM concentration of the drug did potentiate its response to submaximal doses of norepinephrine, and inhibited its response to tyramine. However, the response to norepinephrine of isolated vas deferens taken from rats chronically treated with guanethidine was not affected by hordenine. The investigators concluded that hordenine acted as an inhibitor of norepinephrine reuptake in rat vas deferens.

Hordenine has been found to be a potent stimulant of gastrin release in the rat, being essentially equipotent with N-methyltyramine: 83 nM/kg of hordenine (corresponding to about 14 mg/kg of the free base) enhancing gastrin release by roughly 60%.

In a study of the effects of a large number of compounds on a rat trace amine receptor (rTAR1) expressed in HEK 293 cells, hordenine, at a concentration of 1 μM, had almost identical potency to that of the same concentration of phenethylamine in stimulating cAMP production through the rTAR1. The potency of tyramine in this receptor preparation was slightly higher than that of hordenine.

=== Pharmacokinetics ===
The pharmacokinetics of hordenine have been studied in horses. After intravenous administration of the drug, the α-phase T_{1/2} was found to be about 3 minutes, and the β-phase T_{1/2} was about 35 minutes.

== Chemistry ==
=== Basicity ===
Since the hordenine molecule contains both a basic (amine) and acidic (phenol) functional group, it is amphoteric.

The apparent pK_{a}s for protonated hordenine are 9.78 (phenolic H) and 10.02 (ammonium H).

Common salts are hordenine hydrochloride, R-NH_{3}^{+}Cl^{−}, m.p. 178 °C, and hordenine sulfate, (R-NH_{3}^{+})_{2}SO_{4}^{2−}, m.p. 211 °C.

The "methyl hordenine HCl" which is listed as an ingredient on the labels of some nutritional supplements is in all likelihood simply hordenine hydrochloride, since the "description" of "methyl hordenine HCl" given by virtually all bulk suppliers of this substance corresponds to that for hordenine hydrochloride (or possibly just hordenine).

Five regioisomeric compounds would correspond to the name "methyl hordenine HCl", if it were interpreted according to the rules of chemical nomenclature: α-methylhordenine, β-methylhordenine, 2-methylhordenine, 3-methylhordenine, and 4-O-methylhordenine – each in the form of its HCl salt; N-methylhordenine is better known as the natural product candicine, but is excluded from the possibilities because it is a quaternary ammonium salt that cannot be protonated, hence cannot form a hydrochloride salt.

=== Synthesis ===
The first chemical synthesis of hordenine was reported in 1909 by G. Barger in which 2-phenylethyl alcohol was first converted to 2-phenylethyl chloride using PCl_{5}; this chloride was reacted with dimethylamine to form N,N-dimethyl-phenylethylamine, which was then nitrated using HNO_{3}; the N,N-dimethyl-4-nitro-phenethylamine was reduced to N,N-dimethyl-4-amino-phenethylamine with Sn/HCl; this amine was finally converted to hordenine by diazotization/hydrolysis using NaNO_{2}/H_{2}SO_{4}/H_{2}O.

A more efficient synthetic route was described by C. S. Cheng and coworkers, who also provided references to earlier syntheses. This synthesis began with p-methoxy-phenylethyl alcohol, which was simultaneously O-demethylated and converted to the iodide by heating with HI; the resulting p-hydroxy-phenylethyl iodide was then heated with dimethylamine to give hordenine.

Radio-labelled hordenine has been prepared by the hydrogenation of a mixture of 2-[^{14}C]-tyramine and 40% formaldehyde in the presence of 10% Pd-on-charcoal catalyst. The labelled C in the hordenine is thus the C which is β- to the N.

Hordenine labelled with ^{14}C at the position α- to the N has also been prepared,

=== Analogues ===
Analogues of hordenine (N,N-dimethyltyramine) include tyramine, N-methyltyramine, candicine (N,N,N-trimethyltyramine), N,N-dimethyldopamine, trichocereine (N,N-dimethylmescaline), 4-hydroxyamphetamine, pholedrine (4-hydroxy-N-methylamphetamine), venlafaxine, and desvenlafaxine, among others.

== Natural occurrence ==
Hordenine is present in a fairly wide range of plants, notably amongst the cacti, but has also been detected in some algae and fungi. It occurs in grasses, and is found at significantly high concentrations in the seedlings of cereals such as barley (Hordeum vulgare) (about 0.2%, or 2000 μg/g), proso millet (Panicum miliaceum) (about 0.2%), and sorghum (Sorghum vulgare) (about 0.1%). Reti, in his 1953 review of naturally occurring phenethylamines, notes that the richest source of hordenine is the cactus Trichocereus candicans (now reclassified as Echinopsis candicans), which was found to contain 0.5–5.0% of the alkaloid.

Because barley, via its conversion to malt, is used extensively in the production of beer, beer and malt have been examined by several groups of investigators for the presence of hordenine. Citing a 1965 study by McFarlane, Poocharoen reported that beer contained ~ 12–24 mg/L, wort contained about 11–13 mg/L, and malt contained about 67 μg/g of hordenine. The hordenine content of various malts and malt fractions was extensively studied by Poocharoen himself, who also provided a good coverage of related literature up to 1983. This researcher found a mean concentration of hordenine in raw barley (Note: The level of hordenine in ungerminated barley is negligible, but rises as germination (the first part of the "malting" process) proceeds.) around 0.7 μg/g; in green malts (i.e. barley that had been soaked in water for 2 days then germinated for 4 days), the mean concentration was about 21 μg/g, and in kilned malts (i.e. green malts that had been heated in a kiln for 1–2 days), the mean concentration was about 28 μg/g. When only green malt roots were examined, their mean content of hordenine was roughly 3363 μg/g, whereas the mean level in kilned malt roots was around 4066 μg/g.

In barley, hordenine levels reach a maximum within 5–11 days of germination, then slowly decrease until only traces remain after one month. Furthermore, hordenine is localized primarily in the roots. In comparing literature values for hordenine concentrations in "barley" or barley "malt", therefore, consideration should be made of the age and parts of the plant being analyzed: the figure of about 2,000 μg/g cited in the review by Smith, for example, is consistent with Poocharoen's figures for the hordenine levels in the roots of malted barley, but not in "whole" malt, where his figures of 21-28 μg/g are more consistent with McFarlane's figure of about 67 μg/g. However, a wide range of variability is seen; a study by Lovett and co-workers of 43 different barley lines found concentrations of hordenine in roots ranging from 1 to 2625 μg/g fresh weight. These workers concluded that hordenine production was not under significant genetic control, but much more susceptible to environmental factors such as light duration.

=== Biosynthesis ===
Hordenine is biosynthesized by the stepwise N-methylation of tyramine, which is first converted to N-methyltyramine, and which, in turn is methylated to hordenine. The first step in this sequence is accomplished by the enzyme tyramine N-methyltransferase (tyramine methylpherase), but if the same enzyme is responsible for the second methylation that actually produces hordenine is uncertain.

Hordenine is converted to lignin.

== History ==
The first report of the isolation from a natural source of the compound now known as hordenine was made by Arthur Heffter in 1894, who extracted this alkaloid from the cactus Anhalonium fissuratus (now reclassified as Ariocarpus fissuratus), naming it "anhalin". Twelve years later, E. Léger independently isolated an alkaloid, which he named hordenine, from germinated barley (Hordeum vulgare) seeds. Ernst Späth subsequently showed that these alkaloids were identical and proposed the correct molecular structure for the substance, for which the name "hordenine" was ultimately retained.

== Other species ==
=== Insects ===
Hordenine has been found to act as a feeding deterrent to grasshoppers (Melanoplus bivittatus), and to caterpillars of Heliothis virescens and Heliothis subflexa; the estimated concentration of hordenine that reduced feeding duration to 50% of control was 0.4M for H. virescens and 0.08M for H. subflexa.

=== Plants ===
Hordenine has some plant growth-inhibiting properties: Liu and Lovett reported that, at a concentration of 50 ppm, it reduced the radicle length in seedlings of white mustard (Sinapis alba) by around 7%; admixture with an equal amount of gramine markedly enhanced this inhibitory effect.

== See also ==
- Substituted phenethylamine
- Cactus alkaloids
