= Leptodactyline =

Names
- Preferred IUPAC name 2-(3-Hydroxyphenyl)ethyl-trimethylazanium
- Systematic IUPAC name 3-[2-(Trimethylazaniumyl)ethyl]phenolate (zwitterion)

Identifiers
| CAS Number | 13957-33-0 |
| 3D model (JSmol) | Interactive image |
| ChemSpider | 9957 |
| PubChem CID | 10386 |
| UNII | 3ZSR4KD2J7 |
- InChI: InChI=1S/C11H17NO/c1-12(2,3)9-8-10-4-6-11(13)7-5-10/h4-7H,8-9H2,1-3H3/p+1 Key: PTOJXIKSKSASRB-UHFFFAOYSA-O; InChI=1S/C11H17NO/c1-12(2,3)8-7-10-5-4-6-11(13)9-10/h4-6,9H,7-8H2,1-3H3 Key: VLDBEZDOSUKOBS-UHFFFAOYSA-N
- SMILES: C[N+](C)(C)CCC1=CC(=CC=C1)[O-]

Properties
| Chemical formula | C_{11}H_{17}NO |
| Molar mass | 179.263 g·mol^{−1} |
| Melting point | 198–200 °C (388–392 °F; 471–473 K) |
- Except where otherwise noted, data are given for materials in their standard state (at 25 °C [77 °F], 100 kPa). Infobox references

Leptodactyline is a naturally occurring organic compound that is a quaternary ammonium salt and, in the broadest sense, a phenylethylamine alkaloid. It is cholinergic neurotoxin found in the skin glands of amphibians (primarily frogs of the genus Leptodactylus).

== Chemistry ==
Leptodactyline is a structural isomer of candicine, as the hydroxyl group is located at the 3-position of the benzene ring (i.e. the meta-position), leptodactyline contains a permanently positively charged nitrogen atom, making it a quaternary ammonium сation; from the perspective of strict or more narrow taxonomy, leptodactyline may be regarded as a biogenic amine.

== Toxicology ==
=== Toxicodynamics ===
In vertebrates, leptodactyline exerted a potent nicotinic-like effect and a marked neuromuscular blocking effect.

The primary effect of leptodactyline in mammals is severe paralysis of the skeletal muscles and potent stimulation of the ganglia. Death occurred mainly from asphyxia due to paralysis of the respiratory muscles; however, the effects of ganglionic stimulation may also have contributed to the fatal outcome.

Muscle paralysis and respiratory depression were usually preceded or accompanied by brief periods of rapid breathing, as well as muscle twitching and involuntary, brief, visible twitching of individual muscle bundles throughout the body, excessive salivation, lacrimation, mydriasis alternating with miosis, bowel rumbling, defecation and urination. After death, muscle twitching and fasciculations persisted for several minutes; in birds, it acted to a depolarising muscle relaxant, causing a convulsive syndrome (extensor spasm of the legs and opisthotonos) rather than muscle paralysis. Miosis alternated with mydriasis, and defecation was sometimes observed simultaneously. Frogs and fish were paralysed in a similar way to mammals; the righting reflex disappeared after 5–10 minutes and returned to normal after 20–35 minutes.
