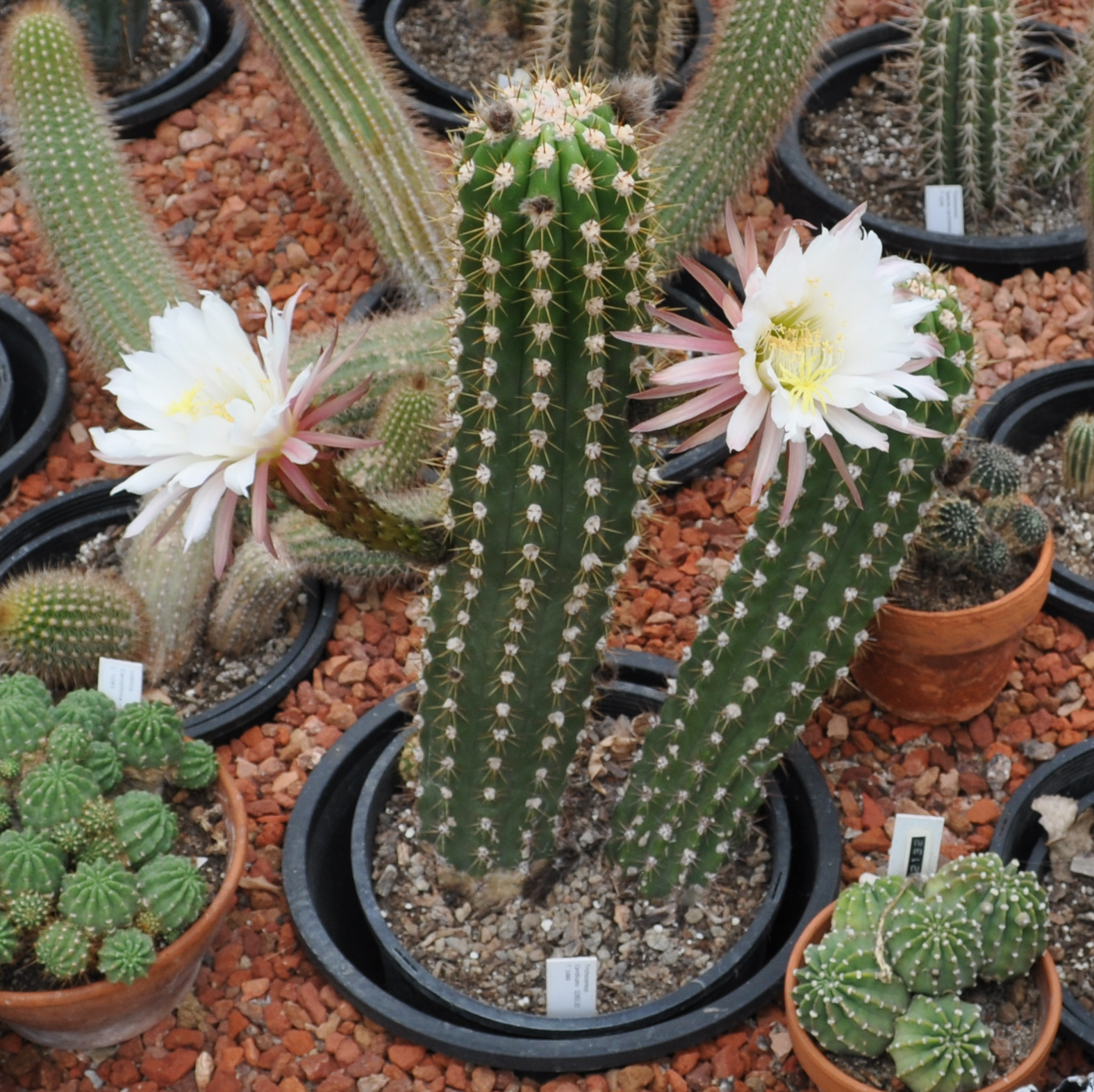

Conservation status
- Least Concern (IUCN 3.1)

Scientific classification
- Kingdom: Plantae
- Clade: Tracheophytes
- Clade: Angiosperms
- Clade: Eudicots
- Order: Caryophyllales
- Family: Cactaceae
- Subfamily: Cactoideae
- Genus: Echinopsis
- Species: E. candicans

Binomial name
- Echinopsis candicans (Gillies ex Salm-Dyck) D.R.Hunt

Synonyms
- List: Cereus candicans Gillies ex Salm-Dyck; Cereus candicans var. courantii K.Schum.; Cereus candicans var. dumesnilianus Zeiss.; Cereus candicans var. gladiatus (Lem.) K.Schum.; Cereus candicans var. robustior Salm-Dyck; Cereus candicans var. spinosior Salm-Dyck ex Walp.; Cereus candicans var. tenuispinus Pfeiff.; Cereus gladiatus Lem.; Cereus gladiatus var. courantii C.F.Först.; Cereus gladiatus var. vernaculatus Monv. ex Labour.; Cereus lamprochlorus Lem., nom. rej. prop.; Cereus lamprochlorus var. salinicola Speg.; Cereus montezumae Pfeiff.; Cereus nitens Salm-Dyck ex Otto & Dietr.; Echinocactus candicans Pfeiff., not validly publ.; Echinocactus vangaertii C.F.Först.; Echinocereus candicans (Gillies ex Salm-Dyck) Haage; Echinocereus candicans var. tenuispinus H.Pfeiff. ex Rümpler; Echinocereus gladiatus (Lem.) Haage; Echinocereus lamprochlorus (Lem.) Engelm. ex Haage; Echinopsis candicans var. gladiata (Lem.) H.Friedrich & G.D.Rowley; Echinopsis candicans var. tenuispina (Pfeiff.) H.Friedrich & G.D.Rowley; Echinopsis courantii (K.Schum.) H.Friedrich & G.D.Rowley; Echinopsis lamprochlora (Lem.) H.Friedrich & Glaetzle; Echinopsis pseudocandicans (R.Kiesling) H.Friedrich & Glaetzle; Echinopsis purpureopilosa (Weing.) H.Friedrich & G.D.Rowley; Helianthocereus pseudocandicans Backeb.; Helianthocereus pseudocandicans var. flaviflorus Backeb.; Helianthocereus pseudocandicans var. roseiflorus (Backeb.) Backeb.; Soehrensia candicans (Gillies ex Salm-Dyck) Schlumpb.; Soehrensia purpureopilosa (Weing.) Lodé; Trichocereus candicans (Gillies ex Salm-Dyck) Britton & Rose; Trichocereus candicans subsp. pseudocandicans Lodé, without indication of the type.; Trichocereus candicans var. gladiatus (Lem.) Y.Itô, without basionym ref.; Trichocereus candicans var. nitens (Salm-Dyck ex Otto & Dietr.) F.Ritter; Trichocereus candicans var. roseiflorus Backeb.; Trichocereus candicans var. tenuispinus (Pfeiff.) Backeb.; Trichocereus courantii (K.Schum.) Backeb.; Trichocereus gladiatus (Lem.) Backeb.; Trichocereus gladiatus Frič; Trichocereus lamprochlorus (Lem.) Britton & Rose; Trichocereus neolamprochlorus Backeb.; Trichocereus pseudocandicans R.Kiesling; Trichocereus purpureopilosus Weing.

= Echinopsis candicans =

Species of cactus

Echinopsis candicans, synonym Soehrensia candicans, is a species of cactus from northern Argentina. It has large fragrant white flowers that open at night.

== Description ==
Echinopsis candicans has a shrubby growth habit, with individual stems up to 60 cm (24 in) tall. The plant as a whole can be as much as 3 m (10 ft) across. The stems are light green, with a diameter of up to 14 cm (5.5 in) and have 9–11 low ribs. The large white areoles are spaced at 2–3 cm (0.8–1.2 in) and produce brownish yellow spines, the central spines being up to 10 cm (3.9 in) long, the radial spines only up to 4 cm (1.6 in).

The fragrant white flowers open at night. They are large, up to 19 cm (7.5 in) across and 18–23 cm (7.1–9.1 in) long.

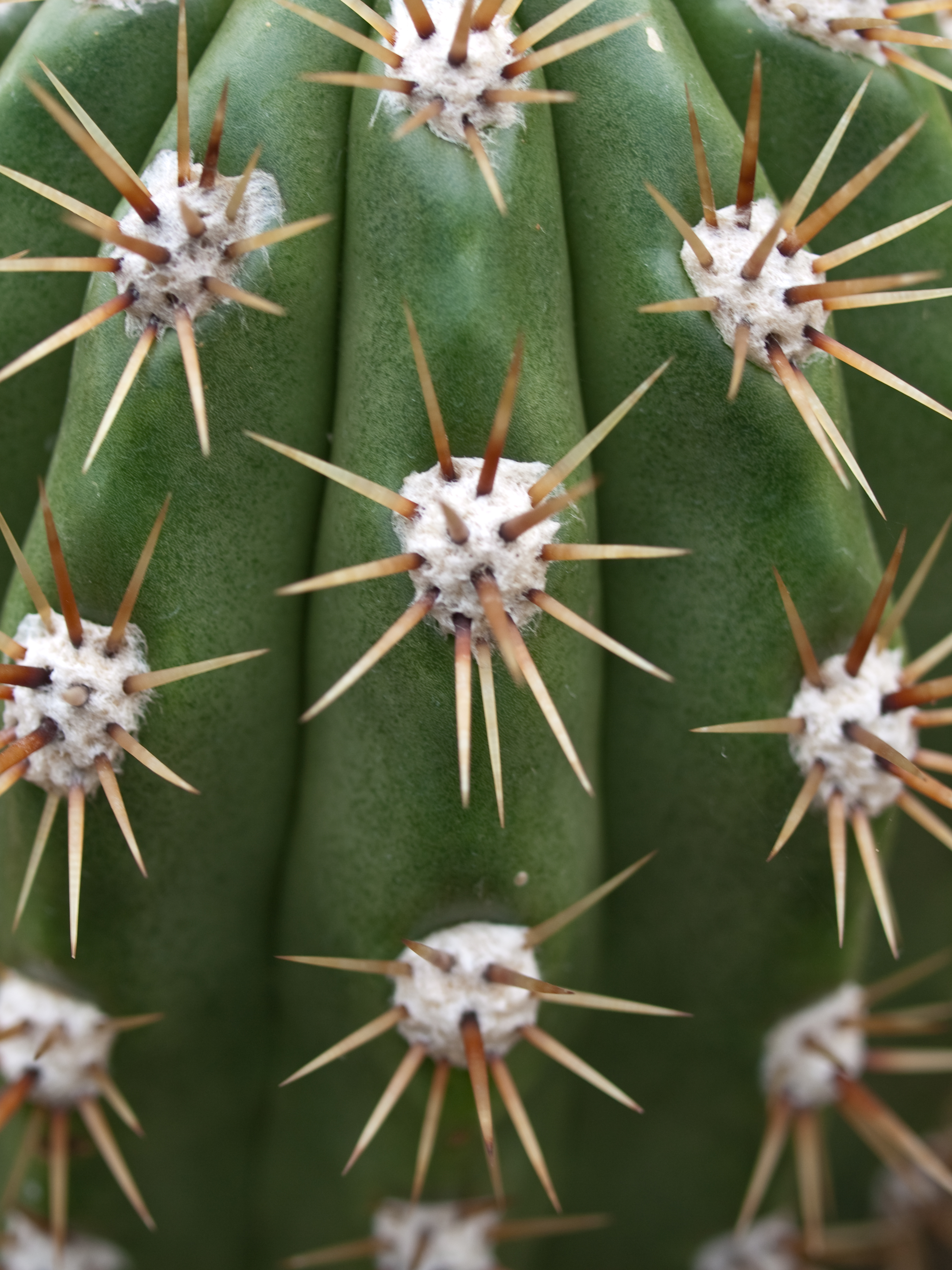
Spines

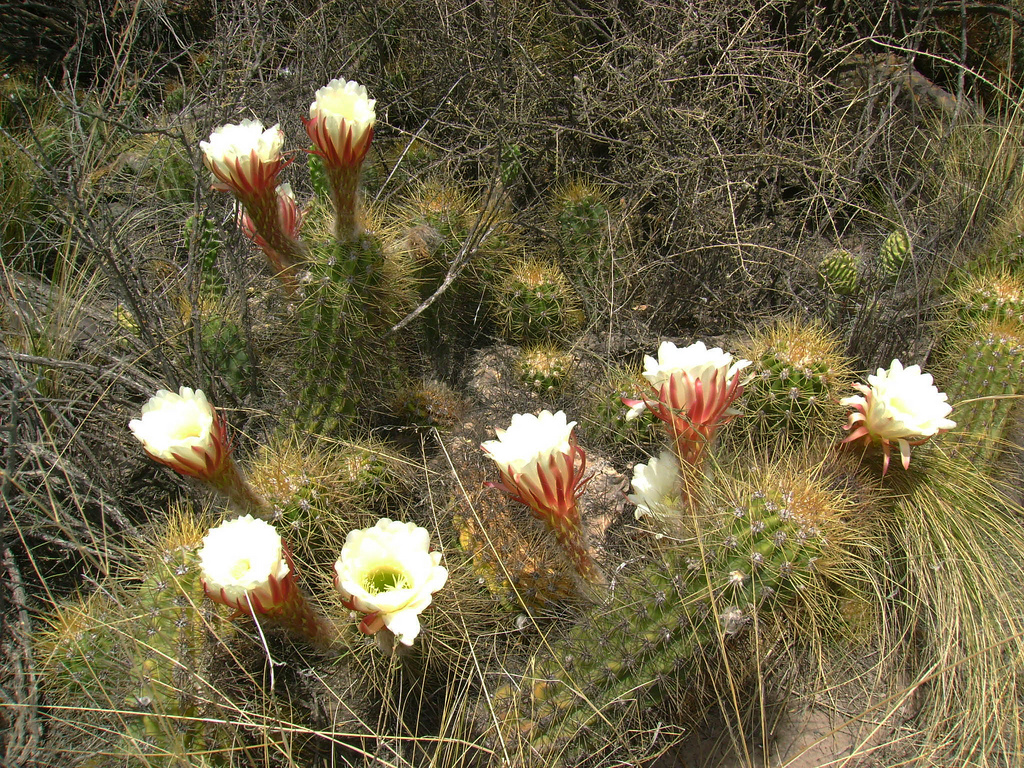
Plants growing in habitat in Mendoza, Argentina

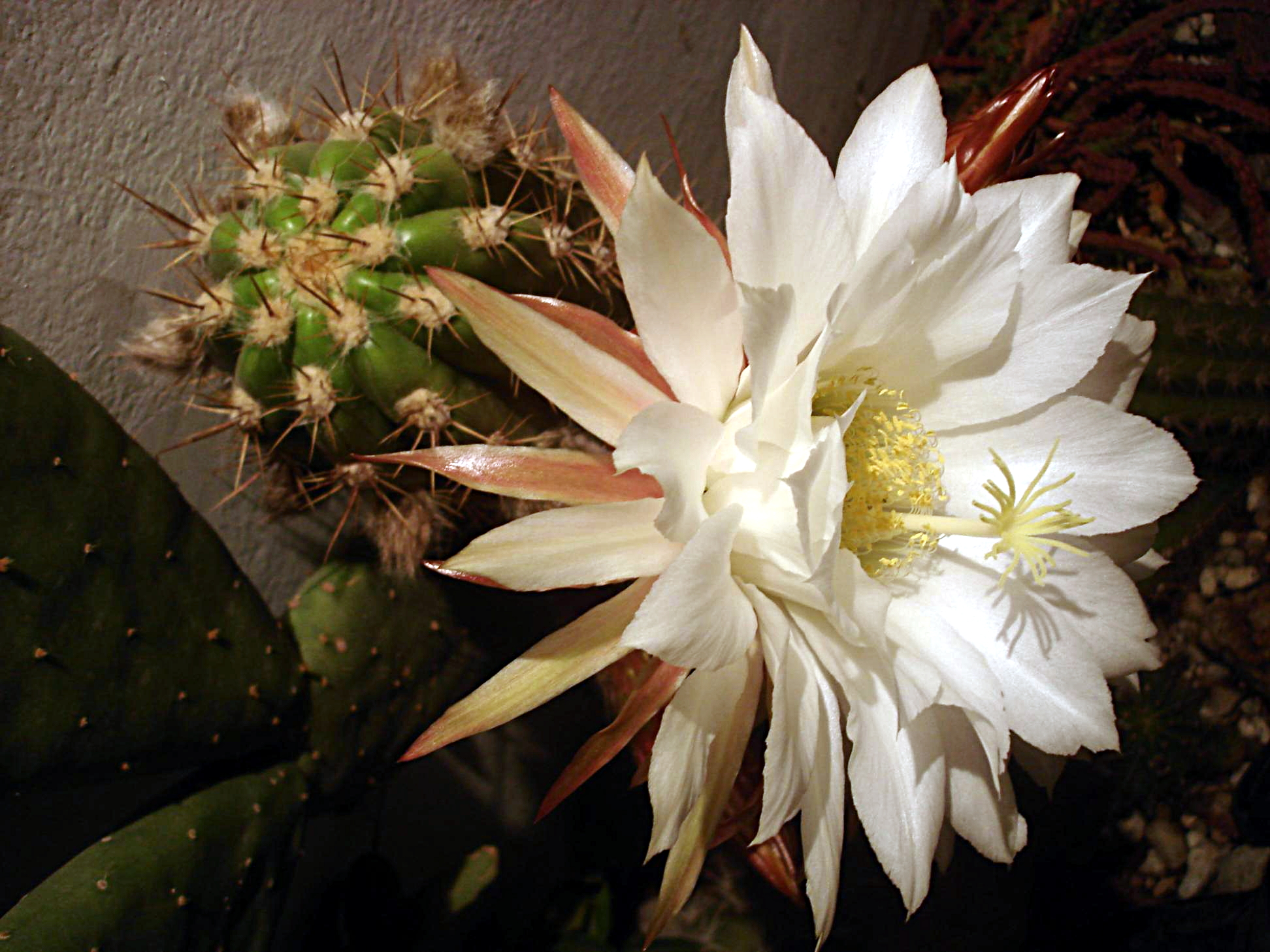
Flower

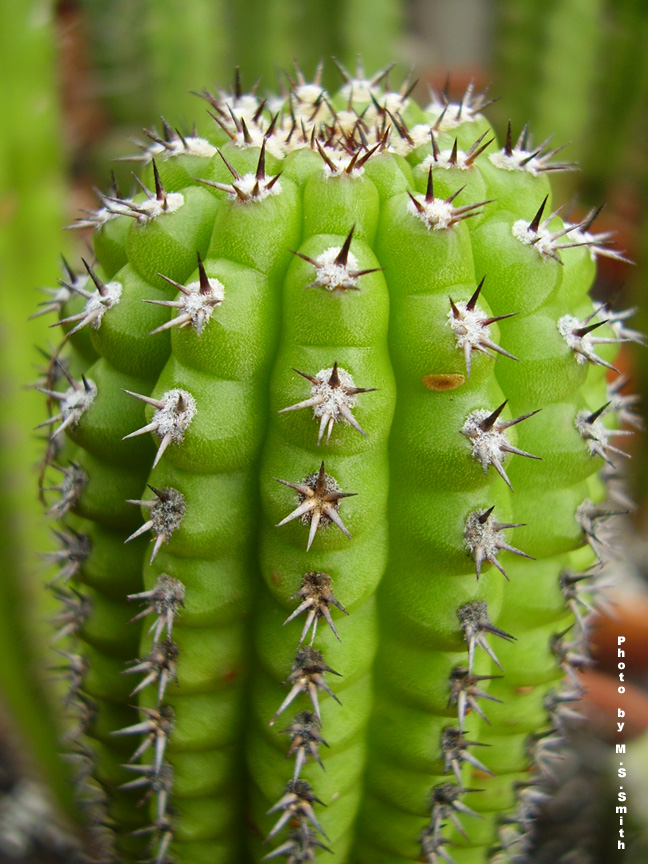
Cultivar 'Brevispinulosus'

== Taxonomy ==
The species was first described in print by Joseph zu Salm-Reifferscheidt-Dyck in 1834 in his work Hortus Dyckensis, where he attributed the name Cereus candicans to Gillies. In 1920, Britton and Rose placed the species in Trichocereus. In a 1987 publication, David Hunt transferred the species to the genus Echinopsis, attributing this placement to Frédéric Weber. In 2010, the broad circumscription of Echinopsis was considered to be controversial; the genus was accepted not to be monophyletic. As of February 2026, Plants of the World Online placed it in the genus Echinopsis.

== Distribution ==
Echinopsis candicans is native to northern Argentina. It is widespread in the Argentine provinces of Mendoza, San Juan, Córdoba, La Rioja, La Pampa, Buenos Aires and San Luis in the foothills of the Andes and Sierras of the Pampas at altitudes of 100 to 2000 meters.

== Pharmacology ==
Echinopsis candicans contains 0.5–5.0% hordenine, an alkaloid of the phenethylamine class sometimes sold as an ingredient of nutritional supplements.
