= Deoxyepinephrine =

Names
- Preferred IUPAC name 4-[2-(Methylamino)ethyl]benzene-1,2-diol
- Other names Epinine; N-Methyldopamine; 3,4-Dihydroxy-N-methylphenethylamine

Identifiers
CAS Number	501-15-5
3D model (JSmol)	Interactive image
ChEMBL	ChEMBL31088
ChemSpider	4229
ECHA InfoCard	100.007.200
KEGG	C07453
MeSH	Deoxyepinephrine
PubChem CID	4382
UNII	R7339QLN1C
CompTox Dashboard (EPA)	DTXSID10198205
- InChI: InChI=1S/C9H13NO2/c1-10-5-4-7-2-3-8(11)9(12)6-7/h2-3,6,10-12H,4-5H2,1H3 Key: NGKZFDYBISXGGS-UHFFFAOYSA-N; InChI=1/C9H13NO2/c1-10-5-4-7-2-3-8(11)9(12)6-7/h2-3,6,10-12H,4-5H2,1H3 Key: NGKZFDYBISXGGS-UHFFFAOYAT
- SMILES: Oc1ccc(cc1O)CCNC

Properties
Chemical formula	C_{9}H_{13}NO_{2}
Molar mass	167.21 g/mol
Appearance	colorless crystalline solid
Melting point	188 to 189 °C (370 to 372 °F; 461 to 462 K)
- Except where otherwise noted, data are given for materials in their standard state (at 25 °C [77 °F], 100 kPa). verify (what is ?) Infobox references

Deoxyepinephrine, also known by the common names N-methyldopamine and epinine, is an organic compound and natural product that is structurally related to the important neurotransmitters dopamine and epinephrine. All three of these compounds also belong to the catecholamine family. The pharmacology of epinine largely resembles that of its "parent", dopamine. Epinine has been found in plants, insects and animals. It is also of significance as the active metabolic breakdown product of the prodrug ibopamine, which has been used to treat congestive heart failure.

== Occurrence ==
Epinine does not seem to occur widely, but it is present as a minor alkaloid in some plants, such as the peyote cactus, Lophophora williamsii, and a species of Acacia, as well as in Scotch Broom, Cytisus scoparius. This compound has also been isolated from the adrenal medulla of pigs and cows, and from the toad, Rhinella marina. It has also been detected in the locust, Locusta migratoria.

== Chemistry ==
=== Preparation ===
The first total synthesis of epinine was reported by Buck, who prepared it from 3,4-dimethoxyphenethylamine ("homoveratrylamine") by first converting the latter to its Schiff base with benzaldehyde, then N-methylating this with methyl iodide; hydrolysis of the resulting product was followed by cleavage of the methyl ethers using hydriodic acid to furnish epinine. A very similar synthesis, differing only in the use of dimethyl sulfate for the N-methylation, and HBr for the O-demethylation, but providing more extensive experimental details, was published by Borgman in 1973.

An earlier semi-synthesis (so-called because it began with the natural product laudanosine) due to Pyman is incorrectly cited by Buck, and the error carried over to the entry for epinine (under the name deoxyepinephrine) in the Merck Index.

Common salts of epinine are: hydrochloride, C_{9}H_{13}NO_{2}.HCl, m.p. 179-180 °C; sulfate, (C_{9}H_{13}NO_{2})_{2}.H_{2}SO_{4}, m.p. 289-290 °C; hydrobromide, C_{9}H_{13}NO_{2}.HBr, m.p. 165-166 °C.

=== Structure ===
The X-ray structure of epinine hydrobromide has been reported.

== Pharmacology ==
One of the most prominent pharmacological characteristics of epinine, its ability to raise blood pressure, was noted as early as 1910, by Barger and Dale, who reported that "methylamino-ethyl-catechol", as they called it, had about 1/7 x the pressor potency of epinephrine, but about 5 x the potency of dopamine ("amino-ethyl-catechol") in cat preparations. The Buroughs Wellcome Co., for which Barger, Dale and Pyman (see "Chemistry" section) worked, subsequently marketed the hydrochloride salt of "methylamino-ethyl-catechol", under the name "epinine", as a substitute for epinephrine. Tainter further quantified the pressor activity of epinine in atropine-treated and anesthetized intact cats, showing that doses of 0.02-0.2 mg, given i.v., were about 1/12 as active as l-epinephrine, but that the effect lasted about twice as long (~ 3 minutes), and was accompanied by an increase in pulse rate.

Eventually, epinine was determined to be a non-selective stimulant of dopamine (DA) receptors, α-, and β-adrenoceptors, with the stimulation of D_{2} receptors leading to inhibition of noradrenergic and ganglionic neurotransmission. These studies, conducted using anesthetized animals, were amplified by van Woerkens and co-workers, who compared the effects of epinine and dopamine in unanesthetized pigs, so as to avoid any possible influences of an anesthetic. Drug doses were in the range of 1-10 μg/kg/min, administered by i.v. infusion over a period of 10 minutes. The results of these experiments showed that, in pigs, over the dose-range employed, epinine was more potent than dopamine as an agonist on D_{2}, α-, and β_{2}-receptors, but was weaker than dopamine as a D_{1}-agonist. The β_{1}-agonist effect of both compounds was weak or non-existent.

Comparable studies, in which blood pressure, heart rate and serum prolactin levels were measured after the administration of 0.5-4 μg/kg/min of epinine by i.v. infusion over a 15-minute period to healthy humans, were reported subsequently by Daul and co-workers. These investigators found that at lower doses (0.5 or 1.0 μg/kg/min), which produced plasma concentrations of 20-80 nM/L, epinine, in common with dopamine, caused a fall in prolactin level, but did not affect blood pressure or heart rate. At higher doses (2.0 or 4.0 μg/kg/min), epinine significantly increased both systolic and diastolic blood pressure, as well as heart rate. In contrast, dopamine caused an increase in systolic blood pressure and heart rate only. Both drugs increased diuresis and natriuresis - effects that are thought to be due to the activation of renal D_{1} receptors. It was concluded that at the lower doses, epinine and dopamine exerted their effects only at DA (D_{2}) receptors, but did not activate α- or β-adrenoceptors. At the higher doses, epinine activated α-, β_{1}- and β_{2}-receptors to about the same extent, whereas dopamine showed only a mild stimulation of β_{1}-receptors, without any effects on α- or β_{2}-receptors. Additionally, it was observed that the effects of epinine were largely due to its direct action on receptors, while dopamine also produced some of its effects indirectly, by stimulating norepinephrine release.

== Toxicity ==
LD_{50} for HCl salt: 212 mg/kg (mouse; i.p.). For comparison, it might be noted that dopamine has a LD_{50} of 1978 mg/kg under the same conditions.

== See also ==
- Dopamine
- N,N-Dimethyldopamine
- N-Methyltyramine
