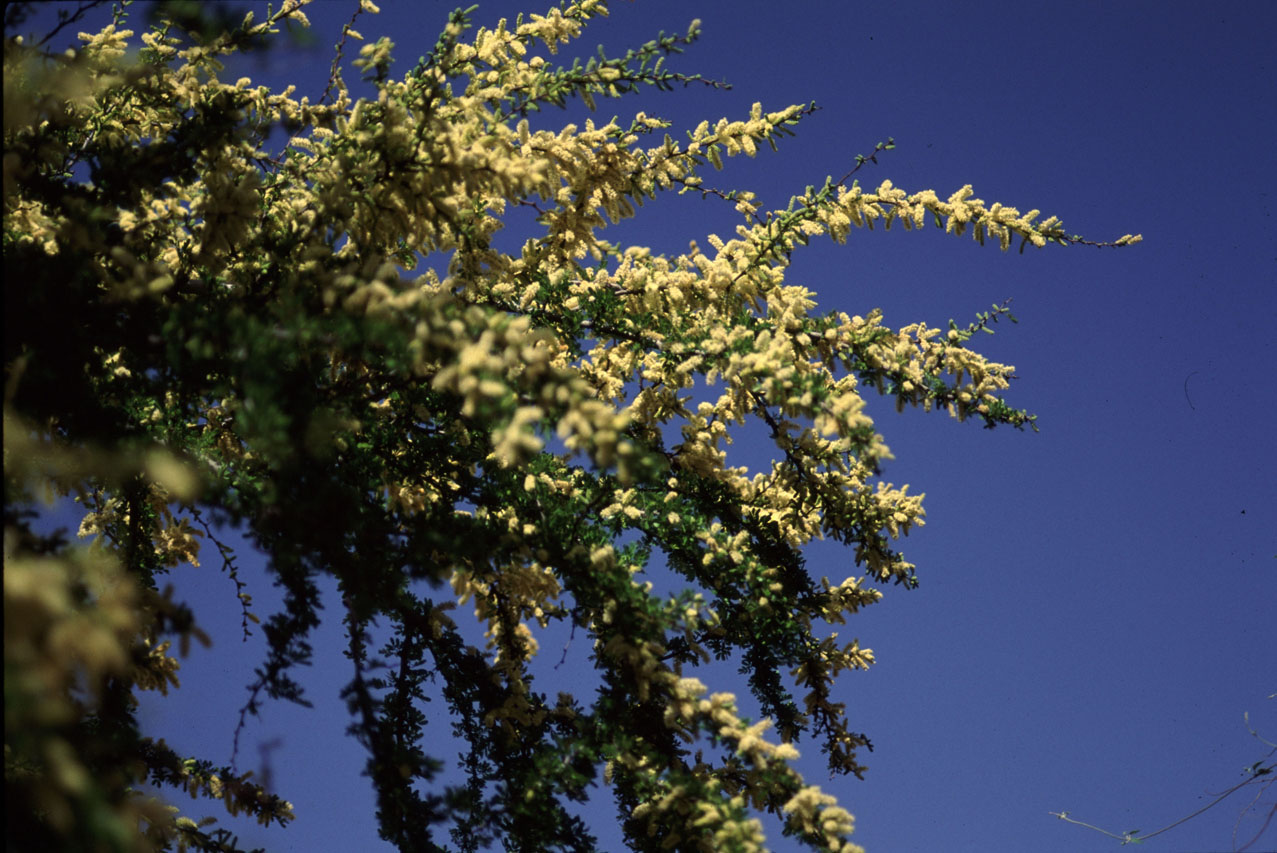

Conservation status
- Least Concern (IUCN 3.1)

- Secure (NatureServe)

Scientific classification
- Kingdom: Plantae
- Clade: Tracheophytes
- Clade: Angiosperms
- Clade: Eudicots
- Clade: Rosids
- Order: Fabales
- Family: Fabaceae
- Subfamily: Caesalpinioideae
- Clade: Mimosoid clade
- Genus: Vachellia
- Species: V. rigidula

Binomial name
- Vachellia rigidula (Benth.) Seigler & Ebinger
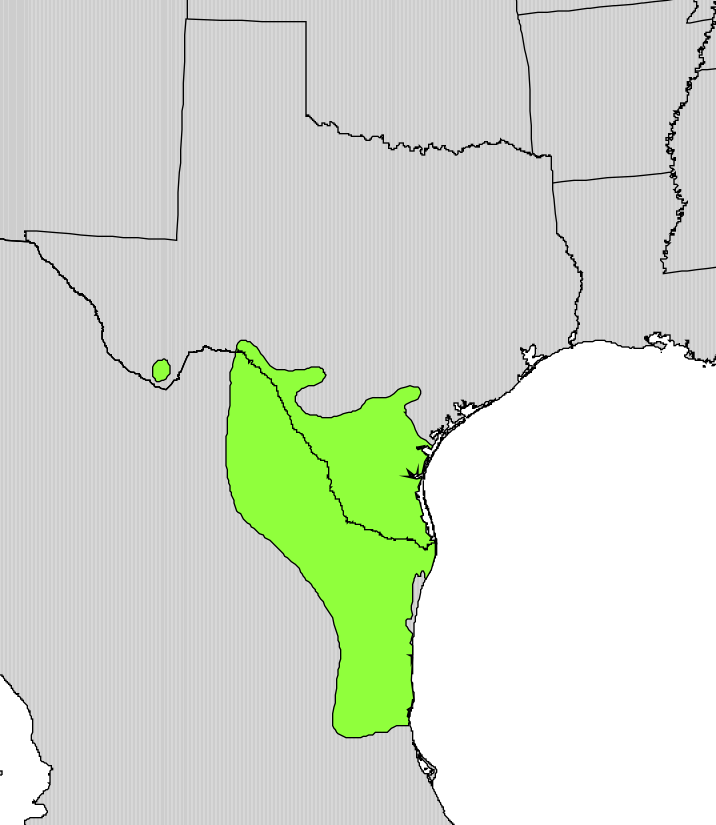
- Natural range

Synonyms
- Acacia rigidula Benth.; Acaciopsis rigidula (Benth.) Britton & Rose

= Vachellia rigidula =

Species of plant

Vachellia rigidula, commonly known as blackbrush acacia or chaparro prieto, and also known as Acacia rigidula, is a species of shrub or small tree in the legume family, Fabaceae. Its native range stretches from Texas in the United States south to central Mexico. This perennial is not listed as being threatened. It reaches a height of 5–15 feet (1.5–4.6 m). Blackbrush acacia grows on limestone hillsides and canyons.

== Phytochemistry ==
A phytochemical study of V. rigidula by workers at the Texas A & M University Agricultural Research and Extension Center at Uvalde, TX, reported the presence of over forty alkaloids, including low amounts (up to around 15 ppm) of several phenolic amines that had previously been found by the same research group in the related species Senegalia berlandieri, but which otherwise are known only as products of laboratory synthesis. Compounds found in the highest concentrations (ranging from a few hundred to a few thousand ppm) were phenethylamine, tryptamine, tyramine, and β-methylphenethylamine (that it can be misidentified as amphetamine). Other notable compounds reported were dimethyltryptamine (DMT), mescaline, and nicotine, although these were found in low concentrations (e.g. mescaline at 3-28 ppm).

The presence of such an unprecedented chemical range of psychoactive compounds, including ones not previously found in nature, in a single plant species has led to the suggestion that some of these findings may have resulted from cross-contamination or were possibly artifacts of the analytical technique.

== Uses ==
Vachellia rigidula is used in weight loss dietary supplements because of the presence of chemical compounds claimed to stimulate beta-receptors to increase lipolysis and metabolic rate and decrease appetite.

Vachellia rigidula is also known as a large honey producer and early blooming plant for its native region.

=== Safety ===
In 2015, 52% of supplements labeled as containing Acacia rigidula were found to be adulterated with synthetic BMPEA, an amphetamine isomer. Consumers following recommended maximum daily servings would consume a maximum of 94 mg of BMPEA per day. In 2012, however, the FDA determined that BMPEA was not naturally present in Acacia rigidula leaves.

== Gallery ==
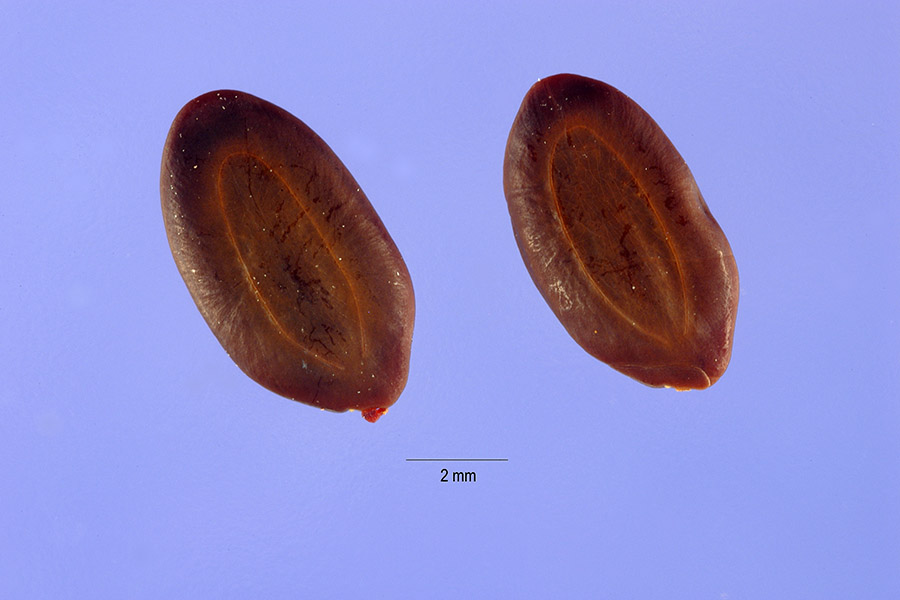
Seeds

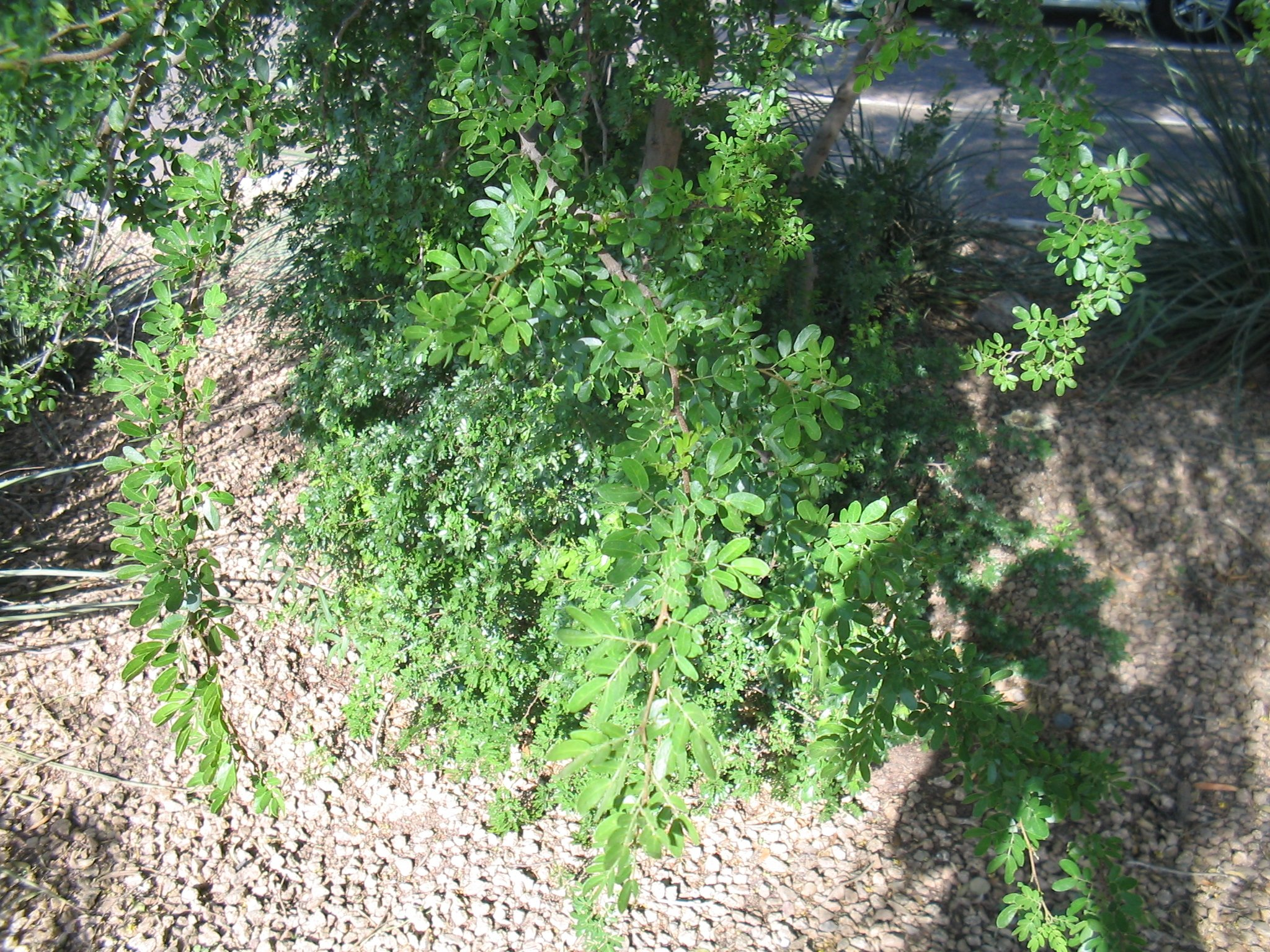
Foliage

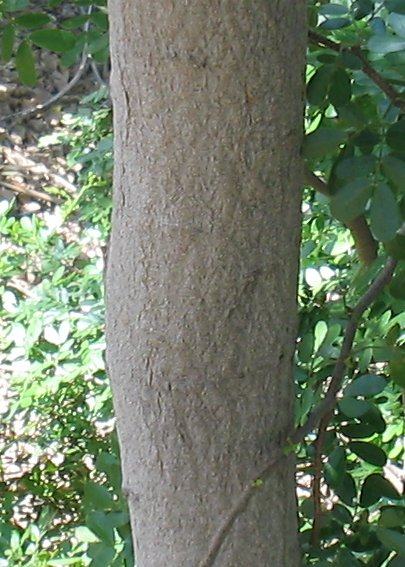
Bark
