= Tyramine =

Trace amine

- Skeletal formula of tyramine

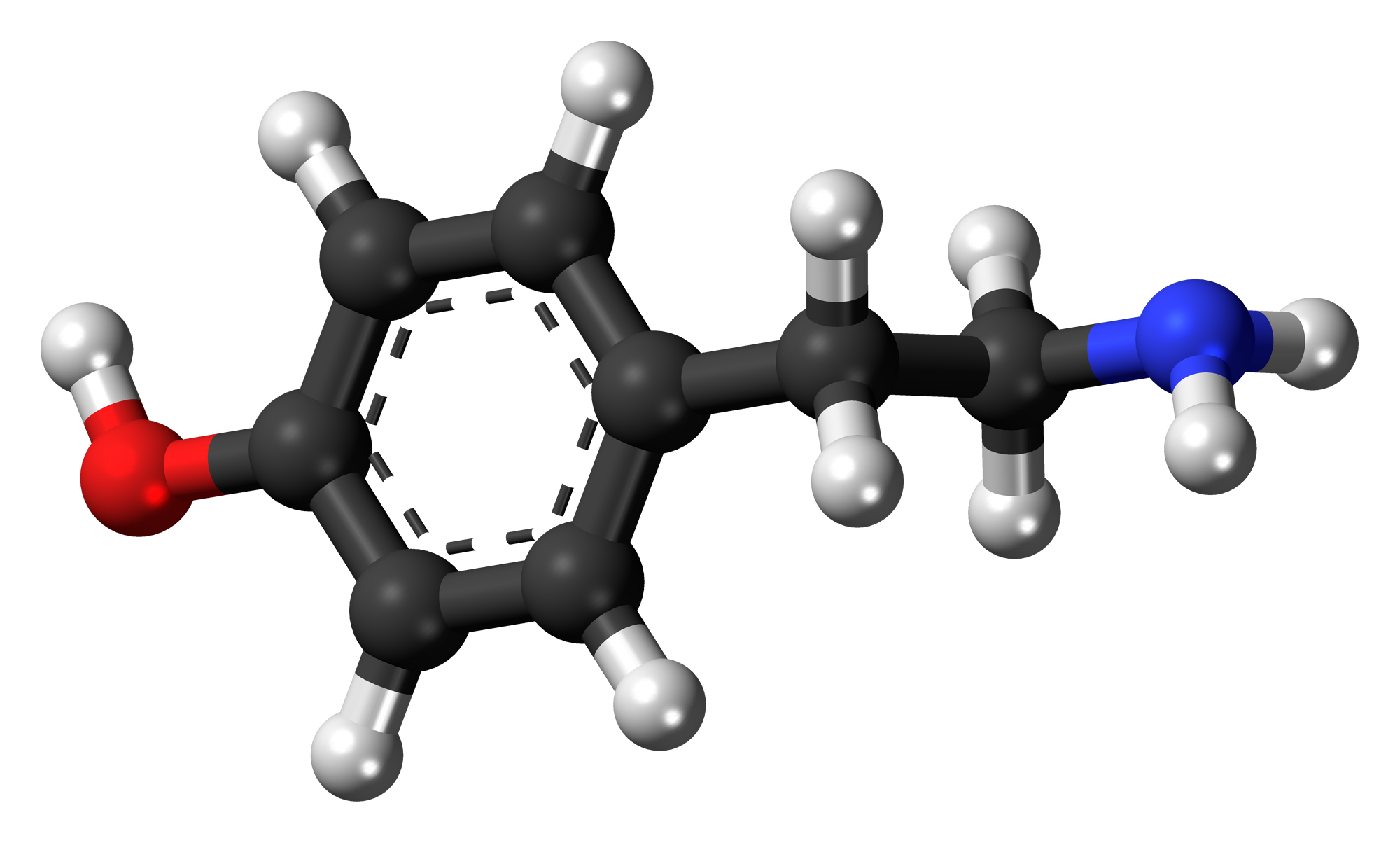
- Ball-and-stick model of the neutral (non-zwitterionic) form of tyramine found in the crystal structure

Clinical data
- Pronunciation: /ˈtaɪrəmiːn/ TY-rə-meen
- Other names: Tyramin; 4-Hydroxyphenethylamine; para-Tyramine; p-Tyramine; 4-Tyramine; Mydrial; Uteramin
- Drug class: Sympathomimetic; Trace amine-associated receptor 1 agonist; Norepinephrine-dopamine releasing agent; Monoaminergic activity enhancer
- ATC code: none

Pharmacokinetic data
- Metabolism: CYP2D6, flavin-containing monooxygenase 3, monoamine oxidase A, monoamine oxidase B, phenylethanolamine N-methyltransferase, dopamine β-hydroxylase, others
- Metabolites: 4-Hydroxyphenylacetaldehyde, dopamine, N-methyltyramine, octopamine

Identifiers
- IUPAC name: 4-(2-aminoethyl)phenol
- CAS Number: 51-67-2
- PubChem CID: 5610
- IUPHAR/BPS: 2150
- ChemSpider: 5408
- UNII: X8ZC7V0OX3
- KEGG: C00483
- ChEBI: CHEBI:15760
- ChEMBL: ChEMBL11608
- CompTox Dashboard (EPA): DTXSID2043874
- ECHA InfoCard: 100.000.106

Chemical and physical data
- Formula: C_{8}H_{11}NO
- Molar mass: 137.182 g·mol^{−1}
- 3D model (JSmol): Interactive image
- Density: 1.103 g/cm^{3} predicted
- Melting point: 164.5 °C (328.1 °F)
- Boiling point: 206 °C (403 °F) at 25 mmHg; 166 °C at 2 mmHg
- SMILES: Oc1ccc(cc1)CCN
- InChI: InChI=1S/C8H11NO/c9-6-5-7-1-3-8(10)4-2-7/h1-4,10H,5-6,9H2; Key:DZGWFCGJZKJUFP-UHFFFAOYSA-N

Tyramine (/ˈtaɪrəmiːn/ TY-rə-meen) (also spelled tyramin), also known under several other names, (Note: Synonyms and alternative names include: 4-hydroxyphenethylamine, para-tyramine, mydrial, and uteramin; the latter two names are not commonly used. The IUPAC name is 4-(2-aminoethyl)phenol.) is a naturally occurring trace amine derived from the amino acid tyrosine. Tyramine acts as a catecholamine releasing agent. Notably, it is unable to cross the blood-brain barrier, resulting in only non-psychoactive peripheral sympathomimetic effects following ingestion. A hypertensive crisis can result, however, from ingestion of tyramine-rich foods in conjunction with the use of monoamine oxidase inhibitors (MAOIs).

== Occurrence ==
Tyramine occurs widely in plants and animals, and is metabolized by various enzymes, including monoamine oxidases. In foods, it often is produced by the decarboxylation of tyrosine during fermentation or decay. Foods that are fermented, cured, pickled, aged, or spoiled have high amounts of tyramine. Tyramine levels go up when foods are at room temperature or go past their freshness date.

Specific foods containing considerable amounts of tyramine include:

- Strong or aged cheeses: cheddar, Swiss, Parmesan, Stilton, Gorgonzola or blue cheeses, Camembert, feta, Muenster
- Meats that are cured, smoked, or processed: such as salami, pepperoni, dry sausages, hot dogs, bologna, bacon, corned beef, pickled or smoked fish, caviar, aged chicken livers, soups or gravies made from meat extract
- Pickled or fermented foods: sauerkraut, kimchi, tofu (especially stinky tofu), pickles, miso soup, bean curd, tempeh, sourdough breads
- Condiments: soy, shrimp, fish, miso, teriyaki, and bouillon-based sauces
- Drinks: beer (especially tap or home-brewed), vermouth, red wine, sherry, liqueurs
- Beans, vegetables, and fruits: fermented or pickled vegetables, overripe fruits
- Chocolate

Scientists more and more consider tyramine in food as an aspect of safety. They propose projects of regulations aimed to enact control of biogenic amines in food by various strategies, including usage of proper fermentation starters, or preventing their decarboxylase activity. Some authors wrote that this has already given positive results, and tyramine content in food is now lower than it has been in the past.

=== In plants ===
Mistletoe (toxic and not used by humans as a food, but historically used as a medicine).

=== In animals ===
Tyramine also plays a role in animals including: In behavioral and motor functions in Caenorhabditis elegans; Locusta migratoria swarming behaviour; and various nervous roles in Rhipicephalus, Apis, Locusta, Periplaneta, Drosophila, Phormia, Papilio, Bombyx, Chilo, Heliothis, Mamestra, Agrotis, and Anopheles.

== Biological activity ==
Monoamine release of tyramine and related agents (EC_{50}, nM)
Compound	NE	DA	5-HT	Ref
Phenethylamine	10.9	39.5	>10,000	
Tyramine	40.6	119	2,775	
Dopamine	66.2	86.9	>10,000 (RI)	
Norepinephrine	164	869	>10,000	
Tryptamine	716	164	32.6	
Dextroamphetamine	6.6–7.2	5.8–24.8	698–1,765	
Notes: The smaller the value, the more strongly the drug releases the neurotransmitter. The assays were done in rat brain synaptosomes and human potencies may be different. See also Monoamine releasing agent § Activity profiles for a larger table with more compounds. Refs:

Tyramine is a norepinephrine and dopamine releasing agent (NDRA) and indirectly acting sympathomimetic. Evidence for the presence of tyramine in the human brain has been confirmed by postmortem analysis. Additionally, the possibility that tyramine acts directly as a neuromodulator was revealed by the discovery of a G protein-coupled receptor with high affinity for tyramine, called the trace amine-associated receptor (TAAR1). The TAAR1 receptor is found in the brain, as well as peripheral tissues, including the kidneys. Tyramine is a full agonist of the TAAR1 in rodents and humans.

Tyramine is physiologically metabolized by monoamine oxidases (primarily MAO-A), FMO3, PNMT, DBH, and CYP2D6. Human monoamine oxidase enzymes metabolize tyramine into 4-hydroxyphenylacetaldehyde. If monoamine metabolism is compromised by the use of monoamine oxidase inhibitors (MAOIs) and foods high in tyramine are ingested, a hypertensive crisis can result, as tyramine also can displace stored monoamines, such as dopamine, norepinephrine, and epinephrine, from pre-synaptic vesicles. Tyramine is considered a "false neurotransmitter", as it enters noradrenergic nerve terminals and displaces large amounts of norepinephrine, which enters the blood stream and causes vasoconstriction.

Additionally, cocaine has been found to block blood pressure rise that is originally attributed to tyramine, which is explained by the blocking of adrenaline by cocaine from reabsorption to the brain.

The first signs of this effect were discovered by a British pharmacist who noticed that his wife, who at the time was on MAOI medication, had severe headaches when eating cheese. For this reason, it is still called the "cheese reaction" or "cheese crisis", although other foods can cause the same problem.

Most processed cheeses do not contain enough tyramine to cause hypertensive effects, although some aged cheeses (such as Stilton) do.

A large dietary intake of tyramine (or a dietary intake of tyramine while taking MAO inhibitors) can cause the tyramine pressor response, which is defined as an increase in systolic blood pressure of 30 mmHg or more. The increased release of norepinephrine (noradrenaline) from neuronal cytosol or storage vesicles is thought to cause the vasoconstriction and increased heart rate and blood pressure of the pressor response. In severe cases, adrenergic crisis can occur. Although the mechanism is unclear, tyramine ingestion also triggers migraine attacks in sensitive individuals and can even lead to stroke. Vasodilation, dopamine, and circulatory factors are all implicated in the migraines. Double-blind trials suggest that the effects of tyramine on migraine may be adrenergic.

Research reveals a possible link between migraines and elevated levels of tyramine. A 2007 review published in Neurological Sciences presented data showing migraine and cluster diseases are characterized by an increase of circulating neurotransmitters and neuromodulators (including tyramine, octopamine, and synephrine) in the hypothalamus, amygdala, and dopaminergic system. People with migraine are over-represented among those with inadequate natural monoamine oxidase, resulting in similar problems to individuals taking MAO inhibitors. Many migraine attack triggers are high in tyramine.

If one has had repeated exposure to tyramine, however, there is a decreased pressor response; tyramine is degraded to octopamine, which is subsequently packaged in synaptic vesicles with norepinephrine (noradrenaline). Therefore, after repeated tyramine exposure, these vesicles contain an increased amount of octopamine and a relatively reduced amount of norepinephrine. When these vesicles are secreted upon tyramine ingestion, there is a decreased pressor response, as less norepinephrine is secreted into the synapse, and octopamine does not activate alpha or beta adrenergic receptors.

When using a MAO inhibitor (MAOI), an intake of approximately 10 to 25 mg of tyramine is required for a severe reaction, compared to 6 to 10 mg for a mild reaction.

Tyramine, like phenethylamine, is a monoaminergic activity enhancer (MAE) of serotonin, norepinephrine, and dopamine in addition to its catecholamine-releasing activity. That is, it enhances the action potential-mediated release of these monoamine neurotransmitters. The compound is active as a MAE at much lower concentrations than the concentrations at which it induces the release of catecholamines. The MAE actions of tyramine and other MAEs may be mediated by TAAR1 agonism.

When given via intracerebroventricular injection in rodents pre-treated with monoamine oxidase inhibitors (MAOIs), tyramine has been found to induce the head-twitch response in rodents. This effect appears to be mediated by induction of serotonin release.

== Biosynthesis ==
Biochemically, tyramine is produced by the decarboxylation of tyrosine via the action of the enzyme tyrosine decarboxylase. Tyramine can, in turn, be converted to methylated alkaloid derivatives N-methyltyramine, N,N-dimethyltyramine (hordenine), and N,N,N-trimethyltyramine (candicine).

Tyramine

N-Methyltyramine

N,N-Dimethyltyramine (hordenine)

N,N,N-Trimethyltyramine (candicine)

In humans, tyramine is produced from tyrosine, as shown in the following diagram.

Biosynthetic pathways for catecholamines and trace amines in the human brain
In humans, catecholamines and phenethylaminergic trace amines are derived from the amino acid L-phenylalanine.

== Chemistry ==
In the laboratory, tyramine can be synthesized in various ways, in particular by the decarboxylation of tyrosine.

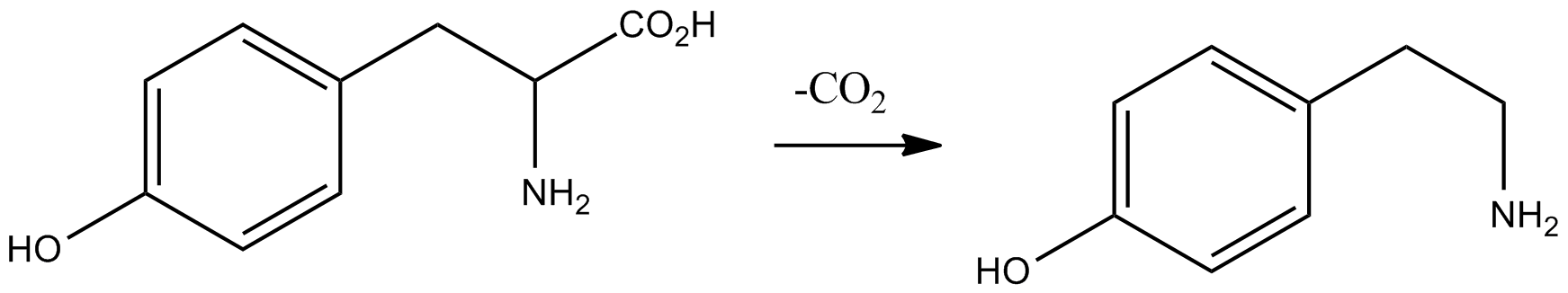
Tyrosine decarboxylation

== Society and culture ==
=== Legal status ===
==== United States ====
Tyramine is a Schedule I controlled substance, categorized as a hallucinogen, making it illegal to buy, sell, or possess in the state of Florida without a license at any purity level or any form whatsoever. The language in the Florida statute says tyramine is illegal in "any material, compound, mixture, or preparation that contains any quantity of [tyramine] or that contains any of [its] salts, isomers, including optical, positional, or geometric isomers, and salts of isomers, if the existence of such salts, isomers, and salts of isomers is possible within the specific chemical designation."

This ban is likely the product of lawmakers overly eager to ban substituted phenethylamines, which tyramine is, in the mistaken assumption that ring-substituted phenethylamines are hallucinogenic drugs like the 2C series of psychedelic substituted phenethylamines. The further banning of tyramine's optical isomers, positional isomers, or geometric isomers, and salts of isomers where they exist, means that meta-tyramine and phenylethanolamine, a substance found in every living human body, and other common, non-hallucinogenic substances are also illegal to buy, sell, or possess in Florida. Given that tyramine occurs naturally in many foods and drinks (most commonly as a by-product of bacterial fermentation), e.g. wine, cheese, and chocolate, Florida's total ban on the substance may prove difficult to enforce.
