= Dopamine hypothesis of stuttering =

The dopamine hypothesis of stuttering attributes to the phenomenon of stuttering a hyperactive and disturbed dopaminergic signal transduction in the brain. The theory is derived from observations in medical neuroimaging and from the empirical response of some antipsychotics and their antagonistic effects on the dopamine receptor. However, it is important to outline that the hypothesis does not consider the excessive dopaminergic activity as the direct cause of stuttering; instead, this synaptic dysregulation is a symptom of a greater disorder that affects other brain pathways and structures.

== Introduction ==
Following the comparative analysis of brain imaging of stuttering and non-stuttering speakers, people who stutter seem to display a heightened dopaminergic activity in striatal regions of the brain. This has been described during a PET study using fluoro-L-DOPA as a marker of presynaptic dopaminergic activity and an MRI study of brain activation patterns. Since dopamine acts as an inhibitor of striatal metabolism, striatal hypometabolism can be explained by the recorded increased levels of presynaptic dopamine in people who stutter as compared to controls groups. There was a significantly higher dopamine reuptake activity in the cortex and subcortical regions associated with speech in people who stuttered, further supporting the hypothesis that dopaminergic pathways within the mesocortical and limbic systems may be more elevated than the norm in people who stutter.

== Arguments in favour of a dopamine hypothesis ==
=== Haloperidol ===
The typical antipsychotic haloperidol has been the most used drug in treatment trials for stuttering. In double-blind placebo-controlled trials with objective speech measures, the group receiving haloperidol displayed significant improvement after a 8-week trial. However, the mechanism of action of this first generation antipsychotic bore important side effects that affected the tolerability in patients and maintaining the improved speech required that subjects keep taking the drug. Moreover, the trial was conducted before the full extent of the risks of using neuroleptics was appreciated; the extrapyramidal symptoms and the possible permanent tardive dyskinea that could result now qualify the drug as dangerous and possibly disproportionate in the treatment of stuttering. Taking into account Haloperidol's mechanism of action that specifically targets dopamine receptors (through silent antagonist for D_{1}, D_{5} and inverse agonist for D_{2}, D_{3}, D_{4}) unlike other neuroleptics as well as its effectiveness over a placebo, the dopaminergic pathway seems to be correlated to the symptoms of stuttering since the drug normalised to some extent the dopaminergic hyperactive state.

=== Aripiprazole ===
Aripiprazole's mode of action differs from other atypical antipsychotics in its selectivity with dopamine receptors (partial agonist activity on postsynaptic D_{2} receptor and partial agonist activity on presynaptic D_{2}, D_{3} and partially D_{4}) and serotonin receptors (partial agonist of 5-HT_{1A} and antagonist of 5-HT_{2A}. Aripiprazole's main antagonist action on the dopamine D_{2} postsynaptic receptor is believed to decrease excessive dopaminergic activity and may also decrease the synthesis and release of dopamine through its presynaptic D_{2} antagonist action. Furthermore, the drug's agonist activity on seretonin receptor 5-HT_{1A} is believed to possess an anxiolytic effect, providing a possible explanation for the decreased social anxiety patients noticed.

=== Antipsychotic-induced stuttering ===
Concomitantly, it is of interest to note that dopamine antagonist have also been reported to cause stuttering in some individuals and speech disorder has been characterised as a proper but uncommon side effect of aripiprazole during the premarketing trials of the drug (Abilify). This effect further corroborates the dysregulated dopaminergic character stuttering ensues from.

=== Similarities with other pathologies ===
Motor tics and Tourette's syndrome share important characteristics with stuttering; they all initially manifest in childhood, affect more males than females, obey a waxing and waning course, and increase in intensity under emotional stress. The treatment of tic disorders in children has been efficient with the administration of aripiprazole, namely single or multiple motor or vocal tics, alluding to similar mechanisms the disorder share with stuttering. Given that these other two conditions seem to respond to the same drug and given the symptomatic similarities, these three disorders not only share common features but maybe a very similar cause.
