= Rostromedial tegmental nucleus =

The rostromedial tegmental nucleus (RMTg), also known as the tail of the ventral tegmental area (tVTA), is a GABAergic nucleus which functions as a "master brake" for the midbrain dopamine system. This region was discovered by the researchers, M. Barrot, J.Kaufling and T. Jhou. It is poorly differentiated from the rest of the ventral tegmental area (VTA) and possesses robust functional and structural links to the dopamine pathways. Notably, both acute and chronic exposure to psychostimulants have been shown to induce FosB and ΔFosB expression in the RMTg; no other drug type has been shown to induce these proteins in the RMTg.

== Inputs ==
The RMTg receives incoming projections from the following structures:

- Medial prefrontal cortex
- Cingulate cortex
- Preoptic area
- Lateral hypothalamus
- Lateral habenula
- Superior colliculus
- Periaqueductal gray
- Dorsal raphe
- Laterodorsal tegmental nucleus
- Substantia nigra
- Nucleus accumbens
- Pontine tegmentum
- Ventral pallidum

== Outputs ==
GABA projections from the RMTg include:

- RMTg → Raphe nuclei
- RMTg → Preoptic area
- RMTg → Lateral hypothalamus
- RMTg → Substantia nigra
- RMTg → VTA
- RMTg → Periaqueductal gray
- RMTg → Pontine tegmentum

== Clinical significance ==
The RMTg plays a "crucial role" in the regulation of dopaminergic neuronal activity in the central nervous system by endogenous opioids and opiate drugs. The GABAergic neurons that project from the RMTg to the midbrain dopaminergic nuclei (i.e., the ventral tegmental area and substantia nigra pars compacta) express μ-opioid receptors. Current evidence suggests that exogenous opiates (e.g., morphine and heroin) excite the dopamine pathways originating in the VTA by activating the μ-opioid receptors in neurons projecting from the RMTg; opioid activation of these neurons leads to disinhibition of the GABAergic brake on dopamine networks. Since RMTg projections to the VTA are the primary inhibitor of the dopaminergic pathways that are implicated in addiction (e.g., the mesolimbic pathway), the RMTg plays a significant role in the development of opiate addictions.

Chemogenetic manipulations of the RMTg bidirectionally alter nociceptive behavior and the analgesic efficacy of systemic morphine, indicating that RMTg output not only gates mesodopamine but also modulates pain processing and opioid analgesia.

Manipulations along the lateral habenula→RMTg pathway bidirectionally modulate ethanol-conditioned place preference (CPP): enhancing RMTg GABAergic inhibition increases CPP, whereas disinhibition reduces it, consistent with RMTg gating of dopamine-driven reward expression. However, ethanol-induced hyperlocomotion does not seem to be mediated by the RMTg.

Psychostimulants have been shown to increase expression of the FosB and ΔFosB in the RMTg; as of 2012, the effects of stimulant-induced increases in ΔFosB expression in the RMTg are not known.
