= Dopamine receptor =

Class of G protein-coupled receptors

Dopamine

Dopamine receptors are a class of G protein-coupled receptors that are prominent in the vertebrate central nervous system (CNS). Dopamine receptors activate different effectors through not only G-protein coupling, but also signalling through different protein (dopamine receptor-interacting proteins) interactions. The neurotransmitter dopamine is the primary endogenous ligand for dopamine receptors.

Dopamine receptors are implicated in many neurological processes, including motivational and incentive salience, cognition, memory, learning, and fine motor control, as well as modulation of neuroendocrine signalling. Abnormal dopamine receptor signalling and dopaminergic nerve function is implicated in several neuropsychiatric disorders. Thus, dopamine receptors are common neurologic drug targets; antipsychotics are often dopamine receptor antagonists while psychostimulants are typically indirect agonists of dopamine receptors.

== Subtypes ==
The existence of multiple types of receptors for dopamine was first proposed in 1976. There are at least five subtypes of dopamine receptors, D_{1}, D_{2}, D_{3}, D_{4}, and D_{5}. The D_{1} and D_{5} receptors are members of the D_{1}-like family of dopamine receptors, whereas the D_{2}, D_{3}, and D_{4} receptors are members of the D_{2}-like family. There is also some evidence that suggests the existence of possible D_{6} and D_{7} dopamine receptors, but such receptors have not been conclusively identified.

At a global level, D_{1} receptors have widespread expression throughout the brain. The relative amount of DA receptors is in the following order: D1 > D2 > D3 > D5 > D4. D_{1-2} receptor subtypes are found at 10–100 times the levels of the D_{3-5} subtypes.

=== D_{1}-like family ===
The D_{1}-like family receptors are coupled to the G protein G_{sα}. D_{1} is also coupled to G_{olf}.

G_{sα} subsequently activates adenylyl cyclase, increasing the intracellular concentration of the second messenger cyclic adenosine monophosphate (cAMP).

- D_{1} is encoded by the Dopamine receptor D_{1} gene (DRD1).
- D_{5} is encoded by the Dopamine receptor D_{5} gene (DRD5).

=== D_{2}-like family ===
The D_{2}-like family receptors are coupled to the G protein G_{iα}, which directly inhibits the formation of cAMP by inhibiting the enzyme adenylyl cyclase.

- D_{2} is encoded by the Dopamine receptor D_{2} gene (DRD2), of which there are two forms: D_{2}Sh (short) and D_{2}Lh (long):
  - The D_{2}Sh form is pre-synaptically situated, having modulatory functions (viz., autoreceptors, which regulate neurotransmission via feedback mechanisms. It affects synthesis, storage, and release of dopamine into the synaptic cleft).
  - The D_{2}Lh form may function as a classical post-synaptic receptor, i.e., transmit information (in either an excitatory or an inhibitory fashion) unless blocked by a receptor antagonist or a synthetic partial agonist.
- D_{3} is encoded by the Dopamine receptor D_{3} gene (DRD3). Maximum expression of dopamine D_{3} receptors is noted in the islands of Calleja and nucleus accumbens.
- D_{4} is encoded by the Dopamine receptor D_{4} gene (DRD4). The D_{4} receptor gene displays polymorphisms that differ in a variable number tandem repeat present within the coding sequence of exon 3. Some of these alleles are associated with greater incidence of certain disorders. For example, the D_{4.7} alleles have an established association with attention-deficit hyperactivity disorder.

=== Receptor heteromers ===
Dopamine receptors have been shown to heteromerize with a number of other G protein-coupled receptors. Especially the D2 receptor is considered a major hub within the GPCR heteromer network. Protomers consist of

Isoreceptors

- D_{1}–D_{2}
- D_{1}–D_{3}
- D_{2}–D_{3}
- D_{2}–D_{4}
- D_{2}–D_{5}

Non-isoreceptors

- D_{1}–adenosine A_{1}
- D_{2}–adenosine A_{2A}
- D_{2}–ghrelin receptor
- D_{2sh}–TAAR1 (an autoreceptor heteromer)
- D_{4}–adrenoceptor α_{1B}
- D_{4}–adrenoceptor β_{1}

== Signalling mechanism ==
Dopamine receptor D_{1} and Dopamine receptor D_{5} are G_{s} coupled receptors that stimulate adenylyl cyclase to produce cAMP, which in turn increases intracellular calcium and mediates a number of other functions. The D2 class of receptors produce the opposite effect, as they are G_{αi} and/or G_{αo} coupled receptors, which blocks the activity of adenylyl cyclase. cAMP mediated protein kinase A activity also results in the phosphorylation of DARPP-32, an inhibitor of protein phosphatase 1. Sustained D1 receptor activity is kept in check by Cyclin-dependent kinase 5. Dopamine receptor activation of Ca^{2+}/calmodulin-dependent protein kinase II can be cAMP dependent or independent.

The cAMP mediated pathway results in amplification of PKA phosphorylation activity, which is normally kept in equilibrium by PP1. The DARPP-32 mediated PP1 inhibition amplifies PKA phosphorylation of AMPA, NMDA, and inward rectifying potassium channels, increasing AMPA and NMDA currents while decreasing potassium conductance.

=== cAMP independent ===
D1 receptor agonism and D2 receptor blockade also increases mRNA translation by phosphorylating ribosomal protein s6, resulting in activation of mTOR. The behavioural implications are unknown. Dopamine receptors may also regulate ion channels and BDNF independent of cAMP, possibly through direct interactions. There is evidence that D1 receptor agonism regulates phospholipase C independent of cAMP, however implications and mechanisms remain poorly understood. D2 receptor signalling may mediate protein kinase B, arrestin beta 2, and GSK-3 activity, and inhibition of these proteins results in stunting of the hyperlocomotion in amphetamine treated rats. Dopamine receptors can also transactivate Receptor tyrosine kinases.

Beta Arrestin recruitment is mediated by G-protein kinases that phosphorylate and inactivate dopamine receptors after stimulation. While beta arrestin plays a role in receptor desensitization, it may also be critical in mediating downstream effects of dopamine receptors. Beta arrestin has been shown to form complexes with MAP kinase, leading to activation of extracellular signal-regulated kinases. Furthermore, this pathway has been demonstrated to be involved in the locomotor response mediated by dopamine receptor D1. Dopamine receptor D2 stimulation results in the formation of an Akt/Beta-arrestin/PP2A protein complex that inhibits Akt through PP2A phosphorylation, therefore disinhibiting GSK-3.

== Role in the central nervous system ==
Dopamine receptors control neural signalling that modulates many important behaviours, such as spatial working memory. Dopamine also plays an important role in the reward system, incentive salience, cognition, prolactin release, emesis, and motor function.

== Non-CNS dopamine receptors ==
=== Cardio-pulmonary system ===
In humans, the pulmonary artery expresses D_{1}, D_{2}, D_{4}, and D_{5} and receptor subtypes, which may account for vasodilatory effects of dopamine in the blood. Such receptor subtypes have also been discovered in the epicardium, myocardium, and endocardium of the heart. In rats, D_{1}-like receptors are present on the smooth muscle of the blood vessels in most major organs.

D_{4} receptors have been identified in the atria of rat and human hearts. Dopamine increases myocardial contractility and cardiac output, without changing heart rate, by signalling through dopamine receptors.

=== Renal system ===
Dopamine receptors are present along the nephron in the kidney, with proximal tubule epithelial cells showing the highest density. In rats, D_{1}-like receptors are present on the juxtaglomerular apparatus and on renal tubules, while D_{2}-like receptors are present on the glomeruli, zona glomerulosa cells of the adrenal cortex, renal tubules, and postganglionic sympathetic nerve terminals. Dopamine signalling affects diuresis and natriuresis.

=== Pancreas ===
The role of the pancreas is to secrete digestive enzymes via exocrine glands and hormones via endocrine glands. Pancreatic endocrine glands, composed of dense clusters of cells called the Islets of Langerhans, secrete insulin, glucagon, and other hormones essential for metabolism and glycemic control. Insulin secreting beta cells have been intensely researched due to their role in diabetes.

Recent studies have found that beta cells, as well as other endocrine and exocrine pancreatic cells, express D2 receptors and that beta cells co-secrete dopamine along with insulin. Dopamine has been purported to be a negative regulator of insulin, meaning that bound D2 receptors inhibit insulin secretion. The connection between dopamine and beta cells was discovered, in part, due to the metabolic side-effects of certain antipsychotic medications. Traditional/typical antipsychotic medications function by altering the dopamine pathway in the brain, such as blocking D2 receptors. Common side effects of these medications include rapid weight gain and glycemic dysregulation, among others. The effects of these medications are not limited to the brain, so off-target effects in other organs such as the pancreas have been proposed as a possible mechanism.

=== Adipose tissue ===
Dopamine receptors D1, D2, D4, and D5 are present in human subcutaneous, visceral, and brown adipose tissue, and have been implicated in lipid and glucose metabolism, and thermogenesis. Dopamine that reaches dopamine receptors in adipose tissue can originate from multiple sources: from the circulation, sympathetic nerves innervating adipose tissue that release dopamine from nerve terminals, local synthesis, or immune cells

== In disease ==
Dysfunction of dopaminergic neurotransmission in the CNS has been implicated in a variety of neuropsychiatric disorders, including social phobia, Tourette's syndrome, Parkinson's disease, schizophrenia, neuroleptic malignant syndrome, attention-deficit hyperactivity disorder (ADHD), and drug and alcohol dependence.

=== Attention-deficit hyperactivity disorder ===
Dopamine receptors have been recognized as important components in the mechanism of ADHD for many years. Drugs used to treat ADHD, including methylphenidate and amphetamine, have significant effects on neuronal dopamine signalling. Studies of gene association have implicated several genes within dopamine signalling pathways; in particular, the D_{4.7} variant of D_{4} has been consistently shown to be more frequent in ADHD patients. ADHD patients with the 4.7 allele also tend to have better cognitive performance and long-term outcomes compared to ADHD patients without the 4.7 allele, suggesting that the allele is associated with a more benign form of ADHD.

The D_{4.7} allele has suppressed gene expression compared to other variants.

=== Addictive drugs ===
Dopamine is the primary neurotransmitter involved in the reward and reinforcement (mesolimbic) pathway in the brain. Although it was a long-held belief that dopamine was the cause of pleasurable sensations such as euphoria, many studies and experiments on the subject have demonstrated that this is not the case; rather, dopamine in the mesolimbic pathway is responsible for behaviour reinforcement ("wanting") without producing any "liking" sensation on its own. Mesolimbic dopamine and its related receptors are a primary mechanism through which drug-seeking behaviour develops (Incentive Salience), and many recreational drugs, such as cocaine and substituted amphetamines, inhibit the dopamine transporter (DAT), the protein responsible for removing dopamine from the neural synapse. When DAT activity is blocked, the synapse floods with dopamine and increases dopaminergic signalling. When this occurs, particularly in the nucleus accumbens, increased D_{1} and decreased D_{2} receptor signalling mediates the "incentive salience" factor and can significantly increase positive associations with the drug in the brain.

=== Pathological gambling ===
Pathological gambling is classified as a mental health disorder that has been linked to obsessive-compulsive spectrum disorder and behavioural addiction. Dopamine has been associated with reward and reinforcement in relation to behaviors and drug addiction. The role between dopamine and pathological gambling may be a link between cerebrospinal fluid measures of dopamine and dopamine metabolites in pathological gambling. Molecular genetic study shows that pathological gambling is associated with the TaqA1 allele of the Dopamine Receptor D2 (DRD2) dopamine receptor. Furthermore, TaqA1 allele is associated with other reward and reinforcement disorders, such as substance abuse and other psychiatric disorders. Reviews of these studies suggest that pathological gambling and dopamine are linked; however, the studies that succeed in controlling for race or ethnicity, and obtain DSM-IV diagnoses do not show a relationship between TaqA1 allelic frequencies and the diagnostic of pathological gambling.

=== Schizophrenia ===
While there is evidence that the dopamine system is involved in schizophrenia, the theory that hyperactive dopaminergic signal transduction induces the disease is controversial. Psychostimulants, such as amphetamine and cocaine, indirectly increase dopamine signalling; large doses and prolonged use can induce symptoms that resemble schizophrenia. Additionally, many antipsychotic drugs target dopamine receptors, especially D_{2} receptors.

=== Genetic hypertension ===
Dopamine receptor mutations can cause genetic hypertension in humans. This can occur in animal models and humans with defective dopamine receptor activity, particularly D_{1}.

=== Parkinson's disease ===
Parkinson's disease is associated with the loss of cells responsible for dopamine synthesis and other neurodegenerative events. Parkinson's disease patients are treated with medications which help to replenish dopamine availability, allowing relatively normal brain function and neurotransmission. Research shows that Parkinson's disease is linked to the class of dopamine agonists instead of specific agents. Reviews touch upon the need to control and regulate dopamine doses for Parkinson's patients with a history of addiction, and those with variable tolerance or sensitivity to dopamine.

== Dopamine regulation ==
Dopamine receptors are typically stable, however sharp (and sometimes prolonged) increases or decreases in dopamine levels can downregulate (reduce the numbers of) or upregulate (increase the numbers of) dopamine receptors.

Haloperidol, and some other antipsychotics, have been shown to increase the binding capacity of the D_{2} receptor when used over long periods of time (i.e. increasing the number of such receptors). Haloperidol increased the number of binding sites by 98% above baseline in the worst cases, and yielded significant dyskinesia side effects.

Addictive stimuli have variable effects on dopamine receptors, depending on the particular stimulus. According to one study, cocaine, opioids like heroin, amphetamine, alcohol, and nicotine cause decreases in D_{2} receptor quantity. A similar association has been linked to food addiction, with a low availability of dopamine receptors present in people with greater food intake. A recent news article summarized a U.S. DOE Brookhaven National Laboratory study showing that increasing dopamine receptors with genetic therapy temporarily decreased cocaine consumption by up to 75%. The treatment was effective for 6 days. Cocaine upregulates D_{3} receptors in the nucleus accumbens, further reinforcing drug seeking behaviour. and Caffeine increases striatal dopamine D_{2}/D_{3} receptor availability in the human brain, Caffeine, or other more selective adenosine A2A receptor antagonists, causes significantly less motor stimulation in dopamine D_{2} receptor.

Certain stimulants will enhance cognition in the general population (e.g., direct or indirect mesocortical DRD1 agonists as a class), but only when used at low (therapeutic) concentrations. Relatively high doses of dopaminergic stimulants will result in cognitive deficits.

Summary of addiction-related plasticity
Form of neuroplasticity or behavioral plasticity	Type of reinforcer						Ref.
Form of neuroplasticity or behavioral plasticity	Opiates	Psychostimulants	High fat or sugar food	Sexual intercourse	Physical exercise (aerobic)	Environmental enrichment	Ref.
ΔFosB expression in nucleus accumbens D1-type MSNs	↑	↑	↑	↑	↑	↑	
Behavioral plasticity
Escalation of intake	Yes	Yes	Yes				
Psychostimulant cross-sensitization	Yes	Not applicable	Yes	Yes	Attenuated	Attenuated	
Psychostimulant self-administration	↑	↑	↓		↓	↓	
Psychostimulant conditioned place preference	↑	↑	↓	↑	↓	↑	
Reinstatement of drug-seeking behavior	↑	↑			↓	↓	
Neurochemical plasticity
CREB phosphorylation in the nucleus accumbens	↓	↓	↓		↓	↓	
Sensitized dopamine response in the nucleus accumbens	No	Yes	No	Yes			
Altered striatal dopamine signaling	↓DRD2, ↑DRD3	↑DRD1, ↓DRD2, ↑DRD3	↑DRD1, ↓DRD2, ↑DRD3		↑DRD2	↑DRD2	
Altered striatal opioid signaling	No change or ↑μ-opioid receptors	↑μ-opioid receptors ↑κ-opioid receptors	↑μ-opioid receptors	↑μ-opioid receptors	No change	No change	
Changes in striatal opioid peptides	↑dynorphin No change: enkephalin	↑dynorphin	↓enkephalin		↑dynorphin	↑dynorphin	
Mesocorticolimbic synaptic plasticity
Number of dendrites in the nucleus accumbens	↓	↑		↑			
Dendritic spine density in the nucleus accumbens	↓	↑		↑			

== See also ==
- D2 short (presynaptic)
- Category:Dopamine agonists
- Category:Dopamine antagonists
