= Nigrostriatal pathway =

Bilateral pathway in the brain

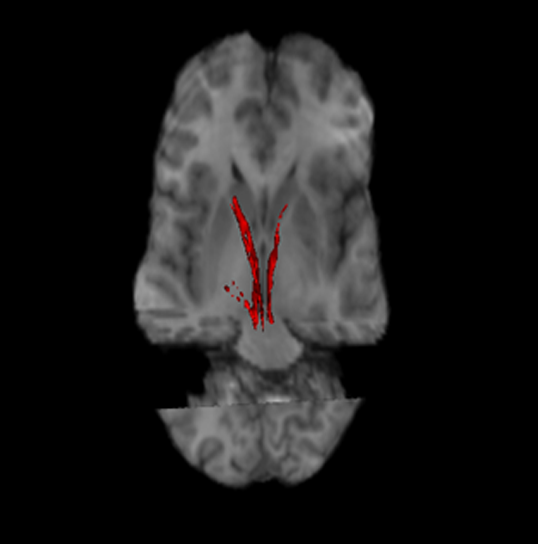
- Nigrostriatal pathway (Left and Right in red).

- The nigrostriatal pathway is shown here in solid blue, connecting the substantia nigra with the dorsal striatum.

The nigrostriatal pathway is a bilateral dopaminergic pathway in the brain that connects the substantia nigra pars compacta (SNc) in the midbrain with the dorsal striatum (i.e., the caudate nucleus and putamen) in the forebrain. It is one of the four major dopamine pathways in the brain, and is critical in the production of movement as part of a system called the basal ganglia motor loop. Dopaminergic neurons of this pathway release dopamine from axon terminals that synapse onto GABAergic medium spiny neurons (MSNs), also known as spiny projection neurons (SPNs), located in the striatum.

Degeneration of dopaminergic neurons in the SNc is one of the main pathological features of Parkinson's disease, leading to a marked reduction in dopamine function and the symptomatic motor deficits of Parkinson's disease including hypokinesia, tremors, rigidity, and postural imbalance.

== Anatomy ==
The connection between the substantia nigra pars compacta and the dorsal striatum is mediated via dopaminergic axons.

=== Substantia nigra pars compacta (SNc) ===
The substantia nigra is located in the ventral midbrain of each hemisphere. It has two distinct parts, the pars compacta (SNc) and the pars reticulata (SNr). The pars compacta contains dopaminergic neurons from the A9 cell group that forms the nigrostriatal pathway that, by supplying dopamine to the striatum, relays information to the basal ganglia. In contrast, the pars reticulata contains mostly GABAergic neurons.

The SNc is composed of a thin band of cells that overlies the SNr and is situated laterally to the A10 group of dopaminergic neurons in the ventral tegmental area (VTA) that forms the mesolimbic dopamine pathway. The SNc is easily visualized in human brain sections because the dopamine neurons contain a black pigment called neuromelanin which is known to accumulate with age. The dopaminergic cell bodies in the SNc are densely packed with approximately 200,000 to 420,000 dopamine cells in human SNc and 8,000 to 12,000 dopamine cells in mouse SNc. These dopamine cell bodies are localized to one of two chemically defined layers. Those in the upper layer (or dorsal tier) contain a binding protein called calbindin-D28K which can buffer calcium levels inside the cell when it becomes too high or toxic. Dopamine cells in the lower layer (or ventral tier) lack this protein and are more vulnerable to the effects of neurotoxins (e.g. MPTP) that can cause Parkinson disease-like symptoms. The dorsal tier dopamine cells have dendrites that radiate horizontally across the pars compacta, whereas ventral tier dopamine cells have dendrites that extend ventrally into the pars reticulata.

=== Dopaminergic axons ===
The axons from dopamine neurons emanate from a primary dendrite and project ipsilaterally (on the same side) via the medial forebrain bundle to the dorsal striatum. There is a rough topographical correlation between the anatomical localization of the dopamine cell body within the SNc and the area of termination in the dorsal striatum. Dopaminergic cells in the lateral parts of the SNc project mainly to the lateral and caudal (posterior) parts of the striatum, whereas dopamine cells in the medial SNc project to the medial striatum. In addition, dopamine cells in the dorsal tier project to the ventromedial striatum, whereas the ventral tier neurons project to the dorsal caudate nucleus and putamen. In general, there is a greater density of dopaminergic input to the dorsolateral striatum.

Each dopamine neuron has an extremely large unmyelinated axonal arborization which can innervate up to 6% of the striatal volume in a rat. Although all SNc dopamine cells project to both the striosome (or patch) and matrix neurochemical compartments of the striatum, most of the axonal territory of a dorsal tier neuron is in the matrix compartment while the majority of the axonal field of ventral tier neurons is in the striosomes. Nigrostriatal dopamine axons can also give rise to axon collaterals that project to other brain regions. For example, some SNc nigrostriatal dopamine axons send axon collaterals to the pedunculopontine nucleus, ventral pallidum, subthalamic nucleus, globus pallidus, amygdala, and thalamus.

A small number of SNc dorsal tier dopamine neurons also project directly to the cortex, although most of the dopaminergic innervation of the cortex comes from the adjacent VTA dopamine neurons.

=== Dorsal striatum ===
The dorsal striatum is located in the subcortical region of the forebrain. In primates and other mammals, it is divided by the anterior limb of a white matter tract called the internal capsule into two parts: the caudate nucleus and the putamen. In rodents, the internal capsule is poorly developed such that the caudate and putamen are not separated but form one large entity called the caudate putamen (CPu). The majority (about 95%) of cells in the dorsal striatum are GABAergic medium spiny neurons (MSNs), also known as spiny projection neurons (SPNs). Approximately half of these MSNs contain dopamine D1 receptors and project directly to the substantia nigra to form the direct pathway of the basal ganglia, whereas the other half express dopamine D2 receptors that project indirectly to the substantia nigra via the globus pallidus and subthalamic nucleus to form the indirect pathway of the basal ganglia. The remaining 5% of cells are interneurons that are either cholinergic neurons or one of several types of GABAergic neurons. The axons and dendrites of these interneurons stay within the striatum.

The caudate nucleus and putamen receive excitatory information from all areas of the cerebral cortex. These glutamatergic inputs are generally topographically arranged such that the putamen takes information largely from the sensorimotor cortex, whereas the caudate nucleus obtains information largely from the association cortex. In addition, the dorsal striatum receives excitatory inputs from other brain structures like the thalamus, and minor excitatory inputs from the hippocampus and amygdala.

The dorsal striatum contains neurochemically defined compartments called striosomes (also known as patches) that exhibit dense μ-opioid receptor staining embedded within a matrix compartment that contains higher acetylcholinesterase and calbindin-D28K.

The dopaminergic axon terminals of the nigrostriatal pathway synapse onto GABAergic MSNs in the dorsal striatum. They form synapses on the cell body and dendritic shaft regions but mostly on the necks of dendritic spines that also receive glutamatergic input to the heads of the same dendritic spines.

== Function ==
The main function of the nigrostriatal pathway is to influence voluntary movement through basal ganglia motor loops. Along with the mesolimbic and mesocortical dopaminergic pathways, the nigrostriatal dopamine pathway can also influence other brain functions, including cognition, reward, and addiction. Nigrostriatal dopaminergic neurons exhibit tonic and phasic patterns of neuronal firing activity. This can lead to different patterns of dopamine release from the axon terminals in the dorsal striatum and also from the cell body (soma) and dendrites in the SNc and SNr. As well as releasing dopamine, some axons in the nigrostriatal pathway can also co-release GABA.

Basal ganglia connections showing direct and indirect pathways for movement. The nigrostriatal dopamine pathway is shown in pink.

The nigrostriatal pathway influences movement through two pathways, the direct pathway of movement and the indirect pathway of movement.

=== Direct pathway of movement ===
The direct pathway is involved in facilitation of wanted movements. The projections from dopamine D1 receptors containing medium spiny neurons in the caudate nucleus and putamen synapse onto tonically active GABAergic cells in the substantia nigra pars reticulata and the internal segment of the globus pallidus (GPi), which then project to the thalamus. Because the striatonigral / striatoentopeduncular and nigrothalamic pathways are inhibitory, activation of the direct pathway creates an overall net excitatory effect on the thalamus and on movement generated by the motor cortex.

=== Indirect pathway of movement ===
The indirect pathway is involved in suppressing unwanted movement. The projections from dopamine D2 receptors containing medium spiny neurons in the caudate nucleus and putamen synapse onto tonically active GABAergic cells in the external segment of the globus pallidus (GPe), which then projects to the substantia nigra pars reticulata via the excitatory subthalmic nucleus (STN). Because the striatopallidal and nigrothalamic pathways are inhibitory but the subthalamic to nigra pathway is excitatory, activation of the indirect pathway creates an overall net inhibitory effect on the thalamus and on movement by the motor cortex.

== Clinical significance ==
=== Parkinson's disease ===
Parkinson's disease is characterized by severe motor problems, mainly hypokinesia, rigidity, tremors, and postural imbalance. Loss of dopamine neurons in the nigrostriatal pathway is one of the main pathological features of Parkinson's disease. Degeneration of dopamine producing neurons in the substantia nigra pars compacta and the putamen-caudate complex leads to diminished concentrations of dopamine in the nigrostriatal pathway, leading to reduced function and the characteristic symptoms. The symptoms of the disease typically do not show themselves until 80-90% of dopamine function has been lost.

Another hypothesis suggests that Parkinson's disease is an imbalance between dopamine (D.A.) and acetylcholine (ACh) in the dorsal striatum, and not just dopamine deficiency.

==== Levodopa-induced dyskinesia ====
Levodopa-induced dyskinesias (LID) is a complication associated with long-term use of the Parkinson's treatment L-DOPA, characterized by involuntary movement and muscle contractions. This disorder occurs in up to 90% of patients after 9 years of treatment. The use of L-DOPA in patients can lead to interruption of nigrostriatal dopamine projections as well as changes in the post-synaptic neurons in the basal ganglia.

=== Schizophrenia ===
Presynaptic dopamine metabolism is altered in schizophrenia.

== Other dopamine pathways ==
Other major dopamine pathways include:

- mesocortical pathway
- mesolimbic pathway
- tuberoinfundibular pathway

== See also ==
- Dopamine
- Parkinson's disease
- Stuttering
