= Dopamine hypothesis =

Dopamine hypothesis may refer to:

- Dopamine hypothesis of bipolar disorder (see Bipolar_disorder#Proposed_mechanisms)
- Dopamine hypothesis of schizophrenia
- Dopamine hypothesis of stuttering
