= Incertohypothalamic pathway =

The incertohypothalamic pathway is a short dopaminergic pathway from the zona incerta to the hypothalamus of the brain. It has a role in modulation of fear and the integration of autonomic and neuroendocrine responses to specific sensory stimuli for example during sexual behaviour.

== See also ==
- Dopaminergic cell groups
