= D2-like receptor =

Subfamily of dopamine receptors

The D_{2}-like receptors are a subfamily of dopamine receptors that bind the endogenous neurotransmitter dopamine. The D_{2}-like subfamily consists of three G-protein coupled receptors that are coupled to G_{i}/G_{o} and mediate inhibitory neurotransmission, which include D_{2}, D_{3}, and D_{4}. For more information, please see the respective main articles of the individual subtypes.

== See also ==
- D_{1}-like receptor
