= Indirect agonist =

In pharmacology, an indirect agonist or indirect-acting agonist is a substance that enhances the release or action of an endogenous neurotransmitter but has no specific agonist activity at the neurotransmitter receptor itself. Indirect agonists work through varying mechanisms to achieve their effects, including transporter blockade, induction of transmitter release, and inhibition of transmitter breakdown.

== Mechanisms of indirect agonism ==
=== Reuptake inhibition ===
Cocaine is a monoamine transporter blocker and, thus, an indirect agonist of dopamine receptors. Cocaine binds the dopamine transporter (DAT), blocking the protein's ability to uptake dopamine from the synaptic cleft and also blocking DAT from terminating dopamine signaling. Blockage of DAT increases the extracellular concentration of dopamine, therefore increasing the amount of dopamine receptor binding and signaling.

Dipyridamole inhibits reuptake of adenosine, resulting in greater extracellular concentrations of adenosine. Dipyridamole also inhibits the enzyme adenosine deaminase, the enzyme that catalyzes the breakdown of adenosine.

=== Evoking transmitter release ===
Fenfluramine is an indirect agonist of serotonin receptors. Fenfluramine binds to the serotonin transporter, blocking serotonin reuptake. However, fenfluramine also acts to induce non-exocytotic serotonin release; in a mechanism similar to that of methamphetamine in dopamine neurons, fenfluramine binds to VMAT2, disrupting the compartmentalization of serotonin into vesicles and increasing the concentration of cytoplasmic serotonin available for drug-induced release.
