= Mesolimbic pathway =

Brain pathway

The mesolimbic pathway, sometimes referred to as the reward pathway, is a dopaminergic pathway in the brain. The pathway connects the ventral tegmental area in the midbrain to the ventral striatum of the basal ganglia in the forebrain. The ventral striatum includes the nucleus accumbens and the olfactory tubercle.

The release of dopamine from the mesolimbic pathway into the nucleus accumbens regulates incentive salience (e.g. motivation and desire for rewarding stimuli) and facilitates reinforcement and reward-related motor function learning; it may also play a role in the subjective perception of pleasure. The dysregulation of the mesolimbic pathway and its output neurons in the nucleus accumbens plays a significant role in the development and maintenance of an addiction.

== Anatomy ==
The mesolimbic pathway and its positioning in relation to the other dopaminergic pathways

The mesolimbic pathway is a collection of dopaminergic (i.e., dopamine-releasing) neurons that project from the ventral tegmental area (VTA) to the ventral striatum, which includes the nucleus accumbens (NAcc) and olfactory tubercle. It is one of the component pathways of the medial forebrain bundle, which is a set of neural pathways that mediate brain stimulation reward.

The VTA is located in the midbrain and consists of dopaminergic, GABAergic, and glutamatergic neurons. The dopaminergic neurons in this region receive stimuli from both cholinergic neurons in the pedunculopontine nucleus and the laterodorsal tegmental nucleus as well as glutamatergic neurons in other regions such as the prefrontal cortex. The nucleus accumbens and olfactory tubercle are located in the ventral striatum and are primarily composed of medium spiny neurons. The nucleus accumbens is subdivided into limbic and motor subregions known as the NAcc shell and NAcc core. The medium spiny neurons in the nucleus accumbens receive input from both the dopaminergic neurons of the VTA and the glutamatergic neurons of the hippocampus, amygdala, and medial prefrontal cortex. When they are activated by these inputs, the medium spiny neurons' projections release GABA onto the ventral pallidum.

== Function ==
The mesolimbic pathway regulates incentive salience, motivation, reinforcement learning, and fear, among other cognitive processes.

The mesolimbic pathway is involved in motivational cognition. Depletion of dopamine in this pathway, or lesions at its site of origin, decrease the extent to which an animal is willing to go to obtain a reward (e.g. the number of lever presses for intravenous nicotine delivery in rats or time spent searching for food). Dopaminergic drugs are also able to increase the extent an animal is willing to go to obtain a reward. Moreover, the firing rate of neurons in the mesolimbic pathway increases during anticipation of reward, which may explain craving. Mesolimbic dopamine release was once thought to be the primary mediator of pleasure, but is now believed to have only a minor or secondary role in pleasure perception.

== Clinical significance ==
=== Mechanisms of addiction ===
The mesolimbic pathway and a specific set of the pathway's output neurons (e.g. D1-type medium spiny neurons within the nucleus accumbens) play a central role in the neurobiology of addiction. Drug addiction is an illness caused by habitual substance use that induces chemical changes in the brain's circuitry. An addictive drug is defined as a substance that affects the mesolimbic system directly or indirectly by increasing extracellular levels of dopamine.

Common addictive substances such as cocaine, alcohol, and nicotine have been shown to increase extracellular levels of dopamine within the mesolimbic pathway, preferentially within the nucleus accumbens. The mechanisms by which these drugs do so vary depending on the drug prototype. For example, cocaine precludes the re-uptake of synaptic dopamine through blocking the presynaptic dopamine transporter. Another stimulant, amphetamine, reverses the dopamine transporter and induces the release of dopamine from synaptic vesicles. Non-stimulant drugs typically bind with ligand-gated channels or G protein-coupled receptors. Such drugs include alcohol, nicotine, and tetrahydrocannabinol (THC).

Addictive Drugs and their Molecular Interactions
Type	Target	Examples
Alcohol	GABA_{A} Receptor, NMDA Receptor	Beer, wine, and other beverages
Cannabinoids	Cannabinoid Receptor	Cannabis
Nicotine	Nicotinic Acetylcholine Receptor	Tobacco
Opiates	μ Opioid Receptor	Morphine, heroin
Dissociatives	NMDA Receptor	PCP, Ketamine
Stimulants	Dopamine Transporter	Cocaine, amphetamine, methamphetamine

These dopaminergic activations of the mesolimbic pathway are accompanied by the perception of reward. This stimulus-reward association shows a resistance to extinction and creates an increased motivation to repeat that same behavior that caused it. Additionally, drug intake changes synaptic plasticity in the ventral tegmental area and the nucleus accumbens. Repeated exposure to the drug can lead to lasting changes in the brain that gives rise to addictive behavior.

=== Relation to other neurological and psychological disorders ===
The mesolimbic pathway is implicated in schizophrenia, depression, and Parkinson's disease. It is also theorized to be implicated in overuse of digital media, although it could simply be a consequence of a sedentary lifestyle. Each involves distinct structural changes within the mesolimbic pathway.

== Other dopamine pathways ==
- Mesocortical pathway
- Nigrostriatal pathway
- Tuberoinfundibular pathway

== See also ==
- Antipsychotic
- Tardive dyskinesia
- Tolerance
- Withdrawal
- Motivational salience
- Apathy
- Abulia
- Akinetic mutism
