= Tuberoinfundibular pathway =

Group of dopamine neurons that project from arcuate nucleus in hypothalamus

Tuberoinfundibular pathway shown in opaque blue, connecting the hypothalamus with the pituitary gland.

The tuberoinfundibular pathway refers to a population of dopamine neurons that project from the arcuate nucleus (a.k.a. the "infundibular nucleus") in the tuberal region of the hypothalamus to the median eminence. It is one of the four major dopamine pathways in the brain. Dopamine released at this site inhibits the secretion of prolactin from anterior pituitary gland lactotrophs by binding to dopamine receptor D2.

Some antipsychotic drugs block dopamine in the tuberoinfundibular pathway, which can cause an increase in the amount of prolactin in the blood (hyperprolactinemia).

== Other dopamine pathways ==
Other major dopamine pathways include:

- Mesocortical pathway
- Mesolimbic pathway
- Nigrostriatal pathway

== See also ==
- Antipsychotic
- Dopamine
