= Ventral tegmental area =

Group of neurons on the floor of the midbrain

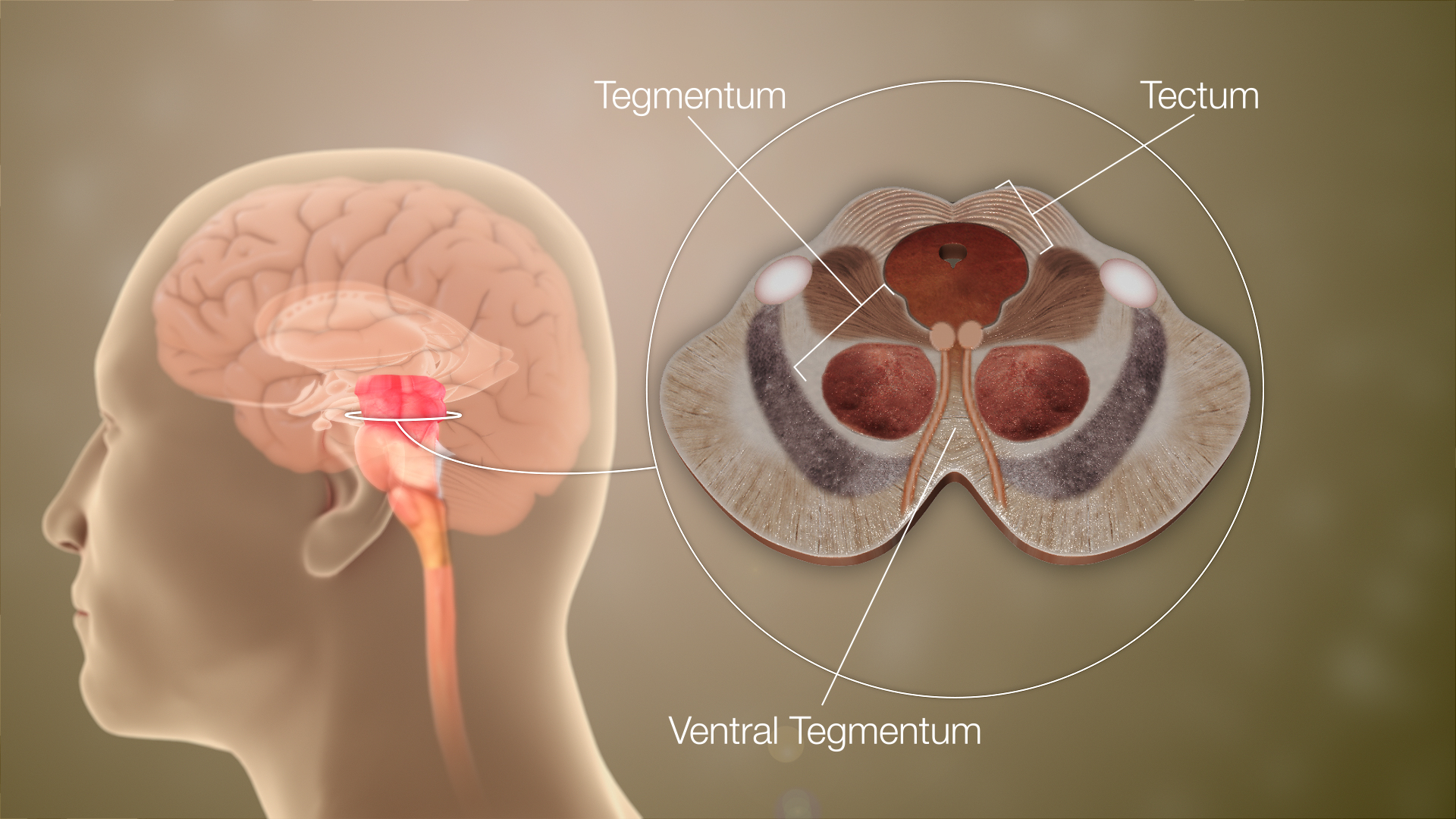
- Ventral tegmentum shown in the tegmentum

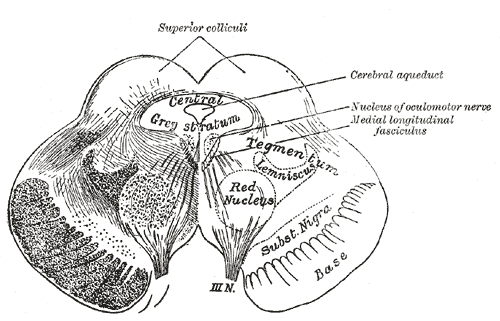
- Transverse section of mid-brain at level of superior colliculi. (Tegmentum labeled at center right.)

Details
- Part of: Midbrain

Identifiers
- Latin: area tegmentalis ventralis
- Acronym: VTA
- MeSH: D017557
- NeuroNames: 521
- NeuroLex ID: birnlex_1415

The ventral tegmental area (VTA) (tegmentum is Latin for covering), also known as the ventral tegmental area of Tsai, or simply ventral tegmentum, is a group of neurons located close to the midline on the floor of the midbrain. The VTA is the origin of the dopaminergic cell bodies of the mesocorticolimbic dopamine system and other dopamine pathways; it is widely implicated in the drug and natural reward circuitry of the brain. The VTA plays an important role in a number of processes, including reward cognition (motivational salience, associative learning, and positively-valenced emotions) and orgasm, among others, as well as several psychiatric disorders. Neurons in the VTA project to numerous areas of the brain, ranging from the prefrontal cortex to the caudal brainstem and several regions in between.

== Structure ==
Neurobiologists have often had great difficulty distinguishing the VTA in humans and other primate brains from the substantia nigra (SN) and surrounding nuclei. Originally, the ventral tegmental area was designated as a ‘nucleus’, but over time ‘area’ became the more appropriate term used because of the heterogeneous cytoarchitectonic features of the region and the lack of clear borders that separate it from adjacent regions. Because of the selective limbic-related afferents to the VTA, the cells of the VTA are given the designation A10 to differentiate them from surrounding cells.

=== Location ===
The ventral tegmental area is in the midbrain between several other major areas, some of which are described here. The mammillary bodies and the posterior hypothalamus, both included in the diencephalon, extend rostrally from the VTA. The red nucleus is situated laterally and oculomotor fibers are situated ventromedially to the VTA. The pons and the hindbrain lie caudally to the VTA. Finally, the substantia nigra is located laterally to the VTA.

=== Subdivisions ===
In 1987, Oades identified four primary nuclei in the VTA A10 group of cells: the nucleus paranigralis (Npn), the nucleus parabrachialis pigmentosus (Npbp), the nucleus interfascicularis (Nif), and the nucleus linearis (Nln) caudalis and rostralis. Presently, scientists divide the VTA up into four similar zones that are called the paranigral nucleus (PN), the parabrachial pigmented area (PBP), the parafasciculus retroflexus area (PFR), and the rostromedial tegmental nucleus (RMTg), which approximately adhere to the previous divisions. Some definitions of the VTA also include the midline nuclei (i.e. the interfascicular nucleus, rostral linear nucleus, and central linear nucleus).

The PN and PBP are rich in dopaminergic cells, whereas the other two regions have low densities of these neurons. The PFR and RMTg contain a low density of tyrosine hydroxylase (TH)-positive cell bodies that are small in size and lightly stain; the RMTg is composed mostly of GABAergic cells. On the other hand, the PN and PBP consist mainly of medium to large sized TH-positive cell bodies that stain moderately.

=== Inputs ===
Almost all areas receiving projections from the VTA project back to it. Thus, the ventral tegmental area is reciprocally connected with a wide range of structures throughout the brain suggesting that it has a role in the control of function in the phylogenetically newer and highly developed neocortex, as well as that of the phylogenetically older limbic areas.

The VTA is a heterogeneous region consisting of a variety of neurons that are characterized by different neurochemical and neurophysiological properties. Therefore, glutamatergic and GABAergic inputs are not exclusively excitatory nor inhibitory. The VTA receives glutamatergic afferents from the prefrontal cortex, pedunculopontine tegmental nucleus (PPTg), laterodorsal tegmental nucleus, subthalamic nucleus, bed nucleus of the stria terminalis, superior colliculus, periaqueductal gray, lateral habenula, dorsal raphe nucleus, and lateral hypothalamic and preoptic areas. These glutamatergic afferents play a key role in regulating VTA cell firing. When the glutamatergic neurons are activated, the firing rates of the dopamine neurons increase in the VTA and induce burst firing. Studies have shown that these glutamatergic actions in the VTA are critical to the effects of drugs of abuse. In contrast, the tail of the ventral tegmental area (tVTA, a.k.a. the RMTg) projects to the VTA with GABAergic afferents, functioning as a "master brake" for the VTA dopamine pathways.

GABAergic inputs to the VTA also include the nucleus accumbens, ventral pallidum, dorsal raphe nucleus, lateral hypothalamus, periaqueductal gray, bed nucleus of the stria terminalis, and rostromedial tegmental nucleus (RMTg). The lateral habenula can also exert an inhibitory effect on dopaminergic neurons in the VTA by exciting RMTg GABAergic neurons, which is thought to play an important role in reward prediction errors. Subpallidal afferents into the VTA are mainly GABAergic and, thus, inhibitory. There is a substantial pathway from the subpallidal area to the VTA. When this pathway is disinhibited, an increase in the dopamine release in the mesolimbic pathway amplifies locomotor activity.

There are also cholinergic inputs to the VTA, although less studied than the glutamatergic and GABAergic inputs. Optogenetic studies in mice looking at cholinergic inputs from the pedunculopontine tegmental nucleus (PPTg) and the laterodorsal tegmental nucleus demonstrate that these circuits reinforce the discharge properties of VTA neurons, suggesting a modulatory influence on reward circuits.

=== Outputs ===
The two primary efferent fiber projections of the VTA are the mesocortical and the mesolimbic pathways, which correspond to the prefrontal cortex and nucleus accumbens respectively. In addition, experiments in rodents have identified a mesohabenular pathway consisting of VTA neurons that do not release dopamine, but glutamate and GABA. Other VTA projections, which utilize dopamine as their primary neurotransmitter, are listed below.

- Ventral tegmental area (VTA) projections

- VTA → Amygdala
- VTA → Entorhinal cortex
- VTA → Cingulate gyrus
- VTA → Hippocampus
- VTA → Nucleus accumbens
- VTA → Olfactory bulb
- VTA → Prefrontal cortex

=== Development ===
Because they develop from common embryonic tissue and partly overlap in their projection fields, Dopaminergic cell groups lack clear anatomical boundaries. During the development of the mammalian brain, both substantia nigra (SN) and VTA neurons initially project to the dorsolateral and ventromedial striatum. However, at birth the SN dopaminergic neurons project exclusively into the dorsolateral striatum, and the VTA dopaminergic neurons project solely into the ventromedial striatum. This pruning of connections occurs through the elimination of the unnecessary collaterals.

== Function ==
As stated above, the VTA, in particular the VTA dopamine neurons, serve several functions in the reward system, motivation, cognition, and drug addiction, and may be the focus of several psychiatric disorders. The VTA has also been shown to process various types of emotion output from the amygdala, where it may also play a role in avoidance and fear-conditioning. Electrophysiological recordings have demonstrated that VTA neurons respond to novel stimuli, unexpected rewards, and reward-predictive sensory cues. The firing pattern of these cells is consistent with the encoding of a reward expectancy error.

In 2006, MRI studies by Helen Fisher and her research team found and documented various emotional states relating to intense love correlated with activity in the VTA, which may help explain obsessive behaviors of rejected partners, since this is shared by the reward system. Nest sharing behavior is associated with increased V1aR expression in the VTA of newly paired zebra finches. However, V1aR expression was not related to female directed song rates, which may indicate a selective role of vasotocin in the VTA on pair maintenance versus courtship behavior.

=== Presence of gap junctions ===
The VTA has been shown to have a large network of GABAergic neurons that are interconnected via gap junctions. This network allows for electrical conduction, which is considerably faster than the chemical conduction of signals between synapses, though less spatially flexible.

=== Neural composition ===
The VTA, like the substantia nigra, is populated with melanin-pigmented dopaminergic neurons. Recent studies have suggested that dopaminergic neurons comprise 50-60% of all neurons in the VTA, which is contrary to previous evidence that noted 77% of neurons within the VTA to be dopaminergic. In addition, there is a sizable population of GABAergic neurons in the rostromedial tegmental nucleus (RMTg), a functionally distinct brain structure. These GABAergic neurons regulate the firing of their dopaminergic counterparts that send projections throughout the brain to, but not limited to, the following regions: the prefrontal cortex, the nucleus accumbens, and the locus coeruleus. The VTA also contains a small percentage of excitatory glutamatergic neurons.

=== Limbic loop ===
The “limbic loop” is very similar to the direct pathway motor loop of the basal ganglia. In both systems, there are major excitatory inputs from the cortex to the striatum (accumbens nucleus), the midbrain projects neuromodulatory dopamine neurons to the striatum, the striatum makes internuclear connections to the pallidum, and the pallidum has outputs to the thalamus, which projects to the cortex, thus completing the loop. The limbic loop is distinguished from the motor loop by the source and nature of the cortical input, the division of the striatum and pallidum that process the input, the source of the dopaminergic neurons from the midbrain, and the thalamic target of the pallidal output. The limbic loop controls cognitive and affective functioning and the motor loop controls movement.

=== CA3 loop ===
Linking context to reward is important for reward seeking. In 2011, a group of researchers documented a CA3-VTA connection that uses the lateral septum as an intermediary. They used a pseudo-rabies virus (PRV) as a transsynaptic tracer, and injected it into the VTA. They found that unilateral injection into the VTA resulted in bilateral PRV labeling in CA3 beginning 48 hours after injection. Lesions of the caudodorsal lateral septum (cd-LS) before VTA PRV injection resulted in significantly less PRV labeled neurons in CA3. Theta wave stimulation of CA3 resulted in increased firing rates for dopamine cells in the VTA, and decreased firing rates for GABA neurons in the VTA. The identity of VTA neurons was confirmed by neurobiotin labeling of the recording neuron, and then histological staining for tyrosine hydroxylase (TH). Temporary inactivation of CA3 via GABA agonists prevented context induced reinstatement of lever pressing for intravenous cocaine.

The authors propose a functional circuit loop where activation of glutamatergic cells in CA3 causes activation of GABAergic cells in cd-LS, which inhibits GABA interneurons in the VTA, releasing the dopamine cells from the tonic inhibition, and leading to an increased firing rate for the dopamine cells.

=== Reward system ===
The dopamine reward circuitry in the human brain involves two projection systems from the ventral midbrain to the nucleus accumbens-olfactory tubercle complex. First, the posteromedial VTA and central linear raphe cells selectively project to the ventromedial striatum, which includes the medial olfactory tubercle and the medial NAC shell. Second, the lateral VTA projects largely to the ventrolateral striatum, which includes the NAC core, the medial NAC shell, and the lateral olfactory tubercle. These pathways are called the meso-ventromedial and the meso-ventrolateral striatal dopamine systems, respectively. The medial projection system is important in the regulation of arousal characterized by affect and drive and plays a different role in goal-directed behavior than the lateral projection system. Unlike the lateral part, the medial one is activated not by rewarding but by noxious stimuli. Therefore, the NAC shell and the posterior VTA are the primary areas involved in the reward system.

== Clinical significance ==
=== Disorders ===
The dopaminergic neurons of the substantia nigra and the ventral tegmental area of the midbrain project to the dorsolateral caudate/putamen and to the ventromedially located nucleus accumbens, respectively, establishing the mesostriatal and the mesolimbic pathways. The close proximity of these two pathways causes them to be grouped together under dopaminergic projections. Several disorders result from the disruption of these two pathways: schizophrenia, Parkinson's disease, and attention deficit hyperactivity disorder (ADHD). Current research is examining the subtle difference between the neurons that are involved in these conditions and trying to find a way to selectively treat a specific dopamine projection.

=== Drug addiction ===
The nucleus accumbens and the ventral tegmental area are the primary sites where addictive drugs act. The following are commonly considered to be addictive: cocaine, alcohol, opioids, nicotine, cannabinoids, and amphetamine and its analogs. These drugs alter the neuromodulatory influence of dopamine on the processing of reinforcement signals by prolonging the action of dopamine in the nucleus accumbens or by stimulating the activation of neurons there and also in the VTA. The most common drugs of abuse stimulate the release of dopamine, which creates both their rewarding and the psychomotor effects. Compulsive drug-taking behaviors are a result of the long-lasting or permanent functional changes in the mesolimbic dopamine system arising from repetitive dopamine stimulation. Molecular and cellular adaptations are responsible for a sensitized dopamine activity in the VTA and along the mesolimbic dopamine projection in response to drug abuse. In the VTA of addicted individuals, the activity of the dopamine-synthesizing enzyme tyrosine hydroxylase increases, as does the ability of these neurons to respond to excitatory inputs. The latter effect is secondary to increases in the activity of the transcription factor CREB and the up regulation of GluR1, an important subunit of AMPA receptors for glutamate. These alterations in neural processing could account for the waning influence of adaptive emotional signals in the operation of decision making faculties as drug-seeking and drug-taking behaviors become habitual and compulsive.

Experiments in rats have shown that they learn to press a lever for the administration of stimulant drugs into the posterior VTA more readily than into the anterior VTA. Other studies have shown that microinjections of dopaminergic drugs into the nucleus accumbens shell increase locomotor activity and exploratory behaviors, conditioned approach responses, and anticipatory sexual behaviors.

The withdrawal phenomenon occurs because the deficit in reward functioning initiates a distress cycle wherein the drugs become necessary to restore the normal homeostatic state. Recent research has shown that even after the final stages of withdrawal have been passed, drug-seeking behavior can be restored if exposed to the drug or drug-related stimuli.

== Comparative anatomy and evolution ==
All studies since 1964 have emphasized the impressive general similarity between the VTA of all mammals from rodents to humans. These studies have focused their efforts on rats, rabbits, dogs, cats, opossum, non-human primates, and humans. There have been slight differences noted, such as changes in the dorsal extent of the A10 cells. To be specific, the dorsal peak of A10 cells is more extensive in primates when compared to other mammals. Furthermore, the number of dopaminergic cells in the VTA increases with phylogenetic progression; for instance, the VTA of the mouse contains approximately 25,000 neurons, while the VTA of a 33-year-old man contains around 450,000 cell bodies.

== See also ==
- Phenylalanine
- List of regions in the human brain
