= Dopaminergic pathways =

Projection neurons in the brain that synthesize and release dopamine

The main dopaminergic pathways of the human brain

Dopaminergic pathways (dopamine pathways, dopaminergic projections) in the human brain are involved in both physiological and behavioral processes including movement, cognition, executive functions, reward, motivation, and neuroendocrine control. Each pathway is a set of projection neurons, consisting of individual dopaminergic neurons.

There are more than 10 dopaminergic cell groups and pathways. The four major dopaminergic pathways are the mesolimbic pathway, the mesocortical pathway, the nigrostriatal pathway, and the tuberoinfundibular pathway. The mesolimbic pathway and the mesocortical pathway form the mesocorticolimbic system. Two other dopaminergic pathways to be considered are the hypothalamospinal tract and the incertohypothalamic pathway.

Parkinson's disease, attention deficit hyperactivity disorder (ADHD), substance use disorders (addiction), and restless legs syndrome (RLS) can be attributed to dysfunction in specific dopaminergic pathways.

The dopamine neurons of the dopaminergic pathways synthesize and release the neurotransmitter dopamine. Enzymes tyrosine hydroxylase and DOPA decarboxylase are required for dopamine synthesis. These enzymes are both produced in the cell bodies of dopamine neurons. Dopamine is stored in the cytoplasm and vesicles in axon terminals. Dopamine release from vesicles is triggered by action potential propagation-induced membrane depolarization. The axons of dopamine neurons extend the entire length of their designated pathway.

== Pathways ==
=== Major ===
Six of the dopaminergic pathways are listed below.

Pathway name		Description	Associated processes	Associated disorders
Mesocorticolimbic system	Mesolimbic pathway	The mesolimbic pathway transmits dopamine from the ventral tegmental area (VTA), which is located in the midbrain, to the ventral striatum, which includes both the nucleus accumbens and olfactory tubercle. The "meso" prefix in the word "mesolimbic" refers to the midbrain, or "middle brain", since "meso" means "middle" in Greek.	reward-related cognition; incentive salience ("wanting"); pleasure ("liking") response from certain stimuli; positive reinforcement; aversion-related cognition	ADHD; addiction; schizophrenia
Mesocorticolimbic system	Mesocortical pathway	The mesocortical pathway transmits dopamine from the VTA to the prefrontal cortex. The "meso" prefix in "mesocortical" refers to the VTA, which is located in the midbrain, and "cortical" refers to the cortex.	executive functions	ADHD; addiction; schizophrenia
Nigrostriatal pathway		The nigrostriatal pathway transmits dopaminergic neurons from the zona compacta of the substantia nigra to the caudate nucleus and putamen. The substantia nigra is located in the midbrain, while both the caudate nucleus and putamen are located in the dorsal striatum.	motor function; reward-related cognition; associative learning	addiction; chorea; Huntington's disease; Schizophrenia; ADHD; Tourette's Syndrome; Parkinson's disease
Tuberoinfundibular pathway		The tuberoinfundibular pathway transmits dopamine from the hypothalamus to the pituitary gland. This pathway controls the secretion of certain hormones, including prolactin, from the pituitary gland. "Infundibular" in the word "tuberoinfundibular" refers to the cup or infundibulum, out of which the pituitary gland develops.	regulation of prolactin secretion	hyperprolactinaemia
Hypothalamospinal tract		The hypothalamospinal pathway influences locomotor networks in the brainstem and spinal cord. Modulating motor control and coordination, showcasing the interconnected nature of neural circuits in the brain.	motor function.	restless legs syndrome
Incertohypothalamic pathway		This pathway from the zona incerta influences the hypothalamus and locomotor centers in the brainstem.	visceral and sensorimotor activities.	tremor

=== Minor ===
Hypothalamospinal
- Hypothalamus → Spinal cord
Incertohypothalamic
- Zona incerta → Hypothalamus
- Zona incerta → Brainstem VTA → Amygdala (mesoamygdaloid pathway)
VTA → Hippocampus
VTA → Cingulate cortex
VTA → Olfactory bulb
SNc → Subthalamic nucleus

== Function ==
=== Mesocorticolimbic system ===
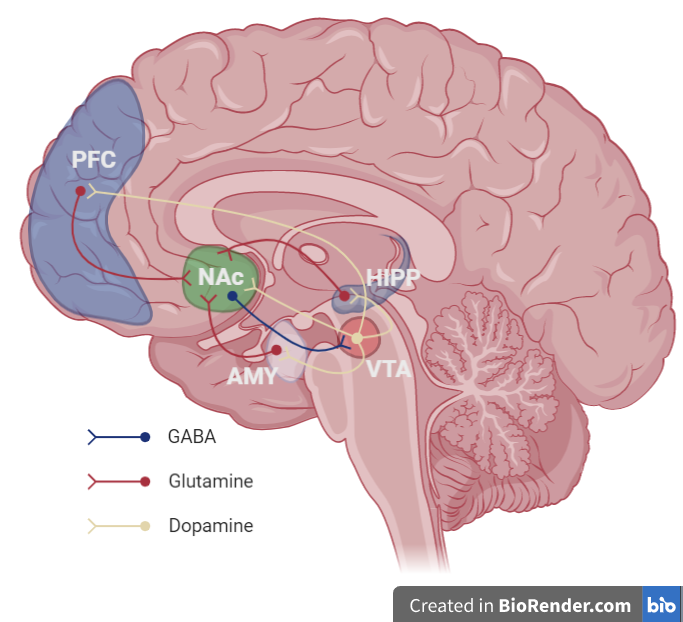
The mesocorticolimbic pathway originates through the VTA and passes through the amygdala, nucleus accumbens, and hippocampus. These functions are relative to memory, emotional regulation, motivation, and reward.

The mesocorticolimbic system (mesocorticolimbic circuit) refers to both the mesocortical and mesolimbic pathways. Both pathways originate at the ventral tegmental area (VTA) which is located in the midbrain. Through separate connections to the prefrontal cortex (mesocortical) and ventral striatum (mesolimbic), the mesocorticolimbic projection has a significant role in learning, motivation, reward, memory and movement. Dopamine receptor subtypes, D1 and D2 have been shown to have complementary functions in the mesocorticolimbic projection, facilitating learning in response to both positive and negative feedback. Both pathways of the mesocorticolimbic system are associated with ADHD, schizophrenia and addiction.

==== Mesocortical pathway ====
The mesocortical pathway projects from the ventral tegmental area to the prefrontal cortex (VTA → Prefrontal cortex). This pathway is involved in cognition and the regulation of executive functions (e.g., attention, working memory, inhibitory control, planning, etc.) Dysregulation of the neurons in this pathway has been connected to ADHD.

==== Mesolimbic pathway ====
Referred to as the reward pathway, mesolimbic pathway projects from the ventral tegmental area to the ventral striatum (VTA → Ventral striatum [nucleus accumbens and olfactory tubercle]). When a reward is anticipated, the firing rate of dopamine neurons in the mesolimbic pathway increases. The mesolimbic pathway is involved with incentive salience, motivation, reinforcement learning, fear and other cognitive processes. In animal studies, depletion of dopamine in this pathway, or lesions at its site of origin, decrease the extent to which an animal is willing to go to obtain a reward (e.g., the number of lever presses for nicotine or time searching for food). Research is ongoing to determine the role of the mesolimbic pathway in the perception of pleasure.

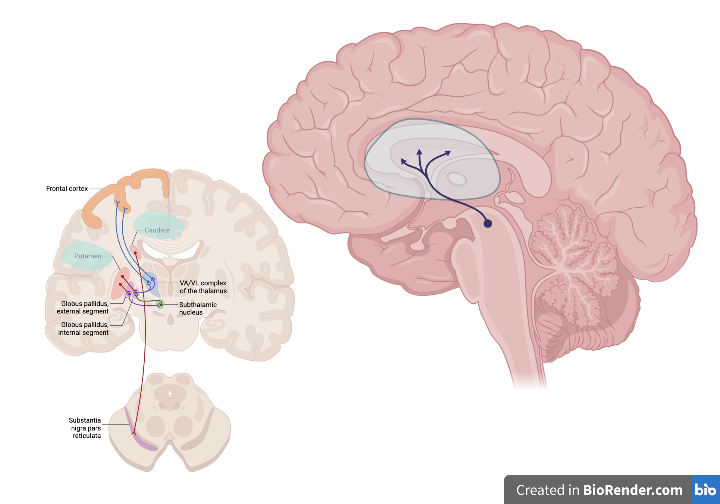
The nigrostriatal pathway is involved in behaviors relating to movement and motivation.

=== Nigrostriatal pathway ===
The nigrostriatal pathway is involved in behaviors relating to movement and motivation. The transmission of dopaminergic neurons to the dorsal striatum particularly plays a role in reward and motivation while movement is influenced by the transmission of dopaminergic neurons to the substantia nigra. The nigrostriatal pathway is associated with conditions such as Huntington's disease, Parkinson's disease, ADHD, Schizophrenia, and Tourette's Syndrome. Huntington's disease, Parkinson's disease, and Tourette's Syndrome are conditions affected by motor functioning while schizophrenia and ADHD are affected by reward and motivation functioning. This pathway also regulates associated learning such as classical conditioning and operant conditioning.

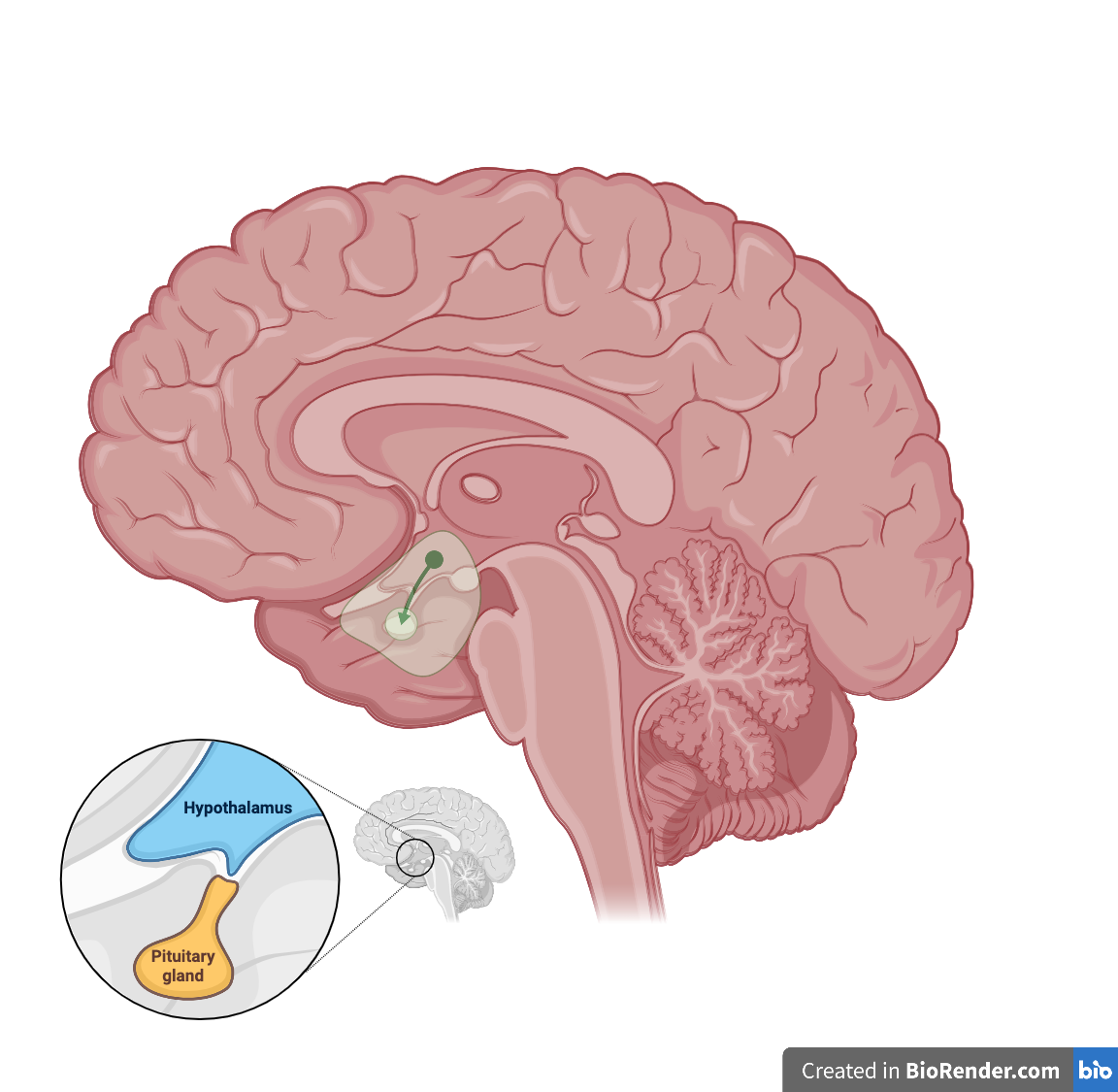
The tuberoinfundibular pathway transmits dopamine the hypothalamus to the pituitary gland.

=== Tuberoinfundibular pathway ===
The tuberoinfundibular pathway transmits dopamine from the hypothalamus to the pituitary gland. This pathway also regulates the secretion of prolactin from the pituitary gland, which is responsible for breast milk production in females. Hyperprolactinemia is an associated condition caused by an excessive amount of prolactin production that is common in pregnant women.

=== Cortico-basal ganglia-thalamo-cortical loop ===
The dopaminergic pathways that project from the substantia nigra pars compacta (SNc) and ventral tegmental area (VTA) into the striatum (i.e., the nigrostriatal and mesolimbic pathways, respectively) form one component of a sequence of pathways known as the cortico-basal ganglia-thalamo-cortical loop. The nigrostriatal component of the loop consists of the SNc, giving rise to both inhibitory and excitatory pathways that run from the striatum into the globus pallidus, before carrying on to the thalamus, or into the subthalamic nucleus before heading into the thalamus. The dopaminergic neurons in this circuit increase the magnitude of phasic firing in response to positive reward error, that is when the reward exceeds the expected reward. These neurons do not decrease phasic firing during a negative reward prediction (less reward than expected), leading to hypothesis that serotonergic, rather than dopaminergic neurons encode reward loss. Dopamine phasic activity also increases during cues that signal negative events, however dopaminergic neuron stimulation still induces place preference, indicating its main role in evaluating a positive stimulus. From these findings, two hypotheses have developed, as to the role of the basal ganglia and nigrostriatal dopamine circuits in action selection. The first model suggests a "critic" which encodes value, and an actor which encodes responses to stimuli based on perceived value. However, the second model proposes that the actions do not originate in the basal ganglia, and instead originate in the cortex and are selected by the basal ganglia. This model proposes that the direct pathway controls appropriate behavior and the indirect suppresses actions not suitable for the situation. This model proposes that tonic dopaminergic firing increases the activity of the direct pathway, causing a bias towards executing actions faster.

These models of the basal ganglia are thought to be relevant to the study of OCD, ADHD, Tourette syndrome, Parkinson's disease, schizophrenia, and addiction. For example, Parkinson's disease is hypothesized to be a result of excessive inhibitory pathway activity, which explains the slow movement and cognitive deficits, while Tourettes is proposed to be a result of excessive excitatory activity resulting in the tics characteristic of Tourettes.

== Regulation ==
The ventral tegmental area and substantia nigra pars compacta receive inputs from other neurotransmitters systems, including glutaminergic inputs, GABAergic inputs, cholinergic inputs, and inputs from other monoaminergic nuclei. The VTA contains 5-HT_{1A} receptors that exert a biphasic effects on firing, with low doses of 5-HT_{1A} receptor agonists eliciting an increase in firing rate, and higher doses suppressing activity. The 5-HT_{2A} receptors expressed on dopaminergic neurons increase activity, while 5-HT_{2C} receptors elicit a decrease in activity. The mesolimbic pathway, which projects from the VTA to the nucleus accumbens, is also regulated by muscarinic acetylcholine receptors. In particular, the activation of muscarinic acetylcholine receptor M2 and muscarinic acetylcholine receptor M4 inhibits dopamine release, while muscarinic acetylcholine receptor M1 activation increases dopamine release. GABAergic inputs from the striatum decrease dopaminergic neuronal activity, and glutaminergic inputs from many cortical and subcortical areas increase the firing rate of dopaminergic neurons. Endocannabinoids also appear to have a modulatory effect on dopamine release from neurons that project out of the VTA and SNc. Noradrenergic inputs deriving from the locus coeruleus have excitatory and inhibitory effects on the dopaminergic neurons that project out of the VTA and SNc. The excitatory orexinergic inputs to the VTA originate in the lateral hypothalamus and may regulate the baseline firing of VTA dopaminergic neurons.

Inputs to the ventral tegmental area (VTA) and substantia nigra pars compacta (SNc)
Neurotransmitter	Origin	Type of Connection	Sources
Glutamate	pedunculopontine nucleus; subthalamic nucleus; laterodorsal tegmental nucleus; stria terminalis; superior colliculus; lateral hypothalamus; preoptic area; periaqueductal gray; raphe nuclei	Excitatory projections into the VTA and SNc	
GABA	rostromedial tegmental nucleus; striatum; local GABAergic inputs	Inhibitory projections into the VTA and SNc	
Serotonin	raphe nuclei	Modulatory effect, depending on receptor subtype Produces a biphasic effect on VTA neurons	
Norepinephrine	locus coeruleus; other noradrenergic nuclei	Modulatory effect, depending on receptor subtype The excitatory and inhibitory effects of the LC on the VTA and SNc are time-dependent	
Endocannabinoids	VTA dopamine neurons (Note: At a chemical synapse, neurotransmitters are normally released from the presynaptic axon terminal and signal through receptors that are located on the dendrites of the postsynaptic neuron; however, in retrograde neurotransmission, the dendrites of the postsynaptic neuron release neurotransmitters that signal through receptors that are located on the axon terminal of the presynaptic neuron. Endocannabinoids signal between neurons through retrograde neurotransmission at synapses; consequently, the dopaminergic neurons that project out of the VTA and SNc release endocannabinoids from their dendrites onto the axon terminals of their inhibitory GABAergic and excitatory glutamatergic inputs to inhibit their effects on dopamine neuronal firing.); SNc dopamine neurons	Excitatory effect on dopaminergic neurons from inhibiting GABAergic inputs Inhibitory effect on dopaminergic neurons from inhibiting glutamatergic inputs May interact with orexins via CB1–OX1 receptor heterodimers to regulate neuronal firing	
Acetylcholine	pedunculopontine nucleus; laterodorsal tegmental nuclei	Modulatory effect, depending on receptor subtype	
Orexin	lateral hypothalamus	Excitatory effect on dopaminergic neurons via signaling through orexin receptors (OX1 and OX2); Increases both tonic and phasic firing of dopaminergic neurons in the VTA; May interact with endocannabinoids via CB1–OX1 receptor heterodimers to regulate neuronal firing	

== See also ==
- Dopaminergic cell groups
