= D1-like receptor =

Subfamily of dopamine receptors

The D_{1}-like receptors are a subfamily of dopamine receptors that bind the endogenous neurotransmitter dopamine. The D_{1}-like subfamily consists of two G protein–coupled receptors that are coupled to G_{s} and mediate excitatory neurotransmission, of which include D_{1} and D_{5}. For more information, please see the respective main articles of the individual subtypes.

== See also ==
- D_{2}-like receptor
