= Dopaminergic cell groups =

Groups of neurons that synthesize dopamine

Details

Identifiers
- Latin: cellulae dopaminergicae
- MeSH: D059290
- NeuroNames: 3138
- TA98: A14.1.09.611
- FMA: 78545

Dopaminergic cell groups, DA cell groups, or dopaminergic nuclei are collections of neurons in the central nervous system that synthesize the neurotransmitter dopamine. In the 1960s, dopaminergic neurons or dopamine neurons were first identified and named by Annica Dahlström and Kjell Fuxe, who used histochemical fluorescence. The subsequent discovery of genes encoding enzymes that synthesize dopamine, and transporters that incorporate dopamine into synaptic vesicles or reclaim it after synaptic release, enabled scientists to identify dopaminergic neurons by labeling gene or protein expression that is specific to these neurons.

In the mammalian brain, dopaminergic neurons form a semi-continuous population extending from the midbrain through the forebrain, with eleven named collections or clusters among them.

== Cell group A8 ==
Group A8 is a small group of dopaminergic cells in rodents and primates. It is located in the midbrain reticular formation dorsolateral to the substantia nigra at the level of the red nucleus and caudally. In the mouse it is identified with the retrorubral field as defined by classical stains.

== Cell group A9 ==
Group A9 is the most densely packed group of dopaminergic cells, and is located in the ventrolateral midbrain of rodents and primates. It is for the most part identical with the pars compacta of the substantia nigra as seen from the accumulation of neuromelanin pigment in the midbrain of healthy, adult humans.

== Cell group A10 ==
Group A10 is the largest group of dopaminergic cells in the ventral midbrain tegmentum of rodents and primates. The cells are located for the most part in the ventral tegmental area, the linear nucleus and, in primates, the part of central gray of the midbrain located between the left and right oculomotor nuclear complexes.

== Cell group A11 ==
Group A11 is a small group of dopaminergic cells located in the posterior periventricular nucleus and the intermediate periventricular nucleus of the hypothalamus in the macaque. In the rat, small numbers of cells assigned to this group are also found in the posterior nucleus of hypothalamus, the supramammillary area and the reuniens nucleus. Dopaminergic cells in A11 may be important in the modulation of auditory processing.

== Cell group A12 ==
Group A12 is a small group of cells in the arcuate nucleus of the hypothalamus in primates. In the rat a few cells belonging to this group are also seen in the anteroventral portion of the paraventricular nucleus of the hypothalamus.

== Cell group A13 ==
Group A13 is distributed in clusters that, in the primate, are ventral and medial to the mammillothalamic tract of the hypothalamus; a few extend into the reuniens nucleus of the thalamus. In the mouse, A13 is located ventral to the mammillothalamic tract of the thalamus in the zona incerta.

== Cell group A14 ==
Group A14 consists of a few cells observed in and near the preoptic periventricular nucleus of the primate. In the mouse, cells in the anterodorsal preoptic nucleus are assigned to this group.

== Cell group A15 ==
Group A15 exists in a few species, such as sheep, and immunoreactive for tyrosine hydroxylase, a precursor of dopamine, in many other species including rodents and primates. It is located in ventral and dorsal components within the preoptic periventricular nucleus and adjacent parts of the anterior hypothalamic region. It is continuous caudally with the dopaminergic group A14.

== Cell group A16 ==
Group A16 is located in the olfactory bulb of vertebrates, including rodents and primates.

== Cell group Aaq ==
Group Aaq is a sparse group of cells located in the rostral half of the central gray of the midbrain in primates. It is more prominent in the squirrel monkey (Saimiri) than the macaque.

== Telencephalic group ==
This group is a population of cells immunoreactive for dopamine and tyrosine hydroxylase that are broadly distributed in the rostral forebrain, including such structures as: substantia innominata, diagonal band, olfactory tubercle, prepyriform area, striatum (at levels rostral to the anterior commissure), claustrum, and deep cortical layers of all gyri of the frontal lobe rostral to the head of the caudate nucleus; the cells are also numerous in intervening white matter, including the external capsule, extreme capsule and frontal white matter. They are found in the rodent, the macaque and the human.

== See also ==
- Dopaminergic pathways
- History of catecholamine research
