= Laterodorsal tegmental nucleus =

Details

Identifiers
- Latin: nucleus tegmentalis posterolateralis
- NeuroNames: 1256
- NeuroLex ID: nlx_144472
- TA98: A14.1.06.318
- TA2: 5894
- FMA: 77654

The laterodorsal tegmental nucleus (or lateroposterior tegmental nucleus) is a nucleus situated in the brainstem, spanning the midbrain tegmentum and the pontine tegmentum. Its location is one-third of the way from the pedunculopontine nucleus to the thalamus, inferior to the pineal gland.

== Function ==
The laterodorsal tegmental nucleus (LDT) sends cholinergic (acetylcholine) projections to many subcortical and cortical structures, including the thalamus, hypothalamus, substantia nigra (dopamine neurons), ventral tegmental area (dopamine neurons), cortex (with bidirectional connections with the prefrontal cortex).

The laterodorsal tegmental nucleus may be involved in modulating sustained attention or in mediating alerting responses, and also in the generation of REM sleep (along with the pedunculopontine nucleus).
