= Mesocortical pathway =

Dopamine pathway in the brain

The mesocortical pathway is shown here in blue, projecting to the prefrontal cortex from the VTA.

The mesocortical pathway is a dopaminergic pathway that connects the ventral tegmentum to the prefrontal cortex. It is one of the four major dopamine pathways in the brain. It is essential to the normal cognitive function of the dorsolateral prefrontal cortex (part of the frontal lobe), and is thought to be involved in cognitive control, motivation, and emotional response.

== Other dopamine pathways ==
Other major dopamine pathways include:

- mesolimbic pathway
- nigrostriatal pathway
- tuberoinfundibular pathway

== See also ==
- Dopamine
- Schizophrenia
