= RG-7410 =

TAAR1 agonist

Clinical data
- Other names: RG7410
- Routes of administration: Unspecified
- Drug class: Trace amine-associated receptor 1 (TAAR1) agonist

Identifiers
- CAS Number: 1967845-81-3

RG-7410 is a trace amine-associated receptor 1 (TAAR1) agonist which was under development for the treatment of schizophrenia but was never marketed. Its route of administration was unspecified.

The drug reached phase 1 clinical trials prior to the discontinuation of its development. It was under development by Hoffmann-La Roche. RG-7410 was first disclosed by January 2014 and a phase 1 trial was reported to have been completed by October 2014.

== See also ==
- List of investigational antipsychotics
- Ralmitaront (RG-7906; RO-6889450)
- RG-7351
- Ulotaront (SEP-363856; SEP-856)
