= RG-7351 =

TAAR1 agonist

Clinical data
- Other names: RG7351
- Drug class: Trace amine-associated receptor 1 (TAAR1) partial agonist

RG-7351 is a trace amine-associated receptor 1 (TAAR1) partial agonist that is or was under development for the treatment of major depressive disorder. It reached phase 1 clinical trials for this indication in 2010. However, as of November 2023, no further recent development has been reported since July 2016. The drug was developed by Hoffmann-La Roche.

== See also ==
- Ralmitaront (RG-7906; RO-6889450)
- RG-7410
- Ulotaront (SEP-363856; SEP-856)
