= Selutaront =

Clinical data
- Drug class: Trace amine-associated receptor 1 (TAAR1) agonist

Identifiers
- IUPAC name: 12-methyl-3-thia-9,12-diazatricyclo[7.4.0.0^{2,6}]trideca-2(6),4-diene
- PubChem CID: 171786782

Chemical and physical data
- Formula: C_{11}H_{16}N_{2}S
- Molar mass: 208.32 g·mol^{−1}
- 3D model (JSmol): Interactive image
- SMILES: CN1CCN2CCC3=C(C2C1)SC=C3
- InChI: InChI=1S/C11H16N2S/c1-12-5-6-13-4-2-9-3-7-14-11(9)10(13)8-12/h3,7,10H,2,4-6,8H2,1H3; Key:HIEMMLQFNGZBMB-UHFFFAOYSA-N

Selutaront is a trace amine-associated receptor 1 (TAAR1) agonist which is being investigated for the potential treatment of schizophrenia. It is a highly selective, low-potency, high-efficacy partial agonist of the human TAAR1 (EC_{50} = 2,330 nM; E_{max} = 83%). The drug shows antipsychotic-like effects in rodents, such as antagonism of dizocilpine (MK-801)-induced hyperlocomotion, without affecting spontaneous locomotor activity when given by itself. The chemical synthesis of selutaront has been described. Selutaront was first described in the scientific literature by Jianzhao Zhang and colleagues in 2026.

== See also ==
- List of investigational antipsychotics
