= C16H26N2O2 =

The molecular formula C_{26}H_{16}N_{2}O_{2} may refer to:

- Dimethocaine, a local anesthetic
- Evenamide, a selective voltage-gated sodium channel blocker
