= Zicronapine =

Atypical antipsychotic medication

Identifiers
- IUPAC name: 4-[(1R,3S)-6-chloro-3-phenyl-2,3-dihydro-1H-inden-1-yl]-1,2,2-trimethylpiperazine
- CAS Number: 170381-16-5
- PubChem CID: 11465618
- DrugBank: DB05828
- ChemSpider: 9640456
- UNII: QZV11V7G6A
- KEGG: D10329
- CompTox Dashboard (EPA): DTXSID30168849

Chemical and physical data
- Formula: C_{22}H_{27}ClN_{2}
- Molar mass: 354.92 g·mol^{−1}
- 3D model (JSmol): Interactive image
- SMILES: Clc1ccc4c(c1)[C@H](N2CC(N(C)CC2)(C)C)C[C@H]4c3ccccc3
- InChI: InChI=1S/C22H27ClN2/c1-22(2)15-25(12-11-24(22)3)21-14-19(16-7-5-4-6-8-16)18-10-9-17(23)13-20(18)21/h4-10,13,19,21H,11-12,14-15H2,1-3H3/t19-,21+/m0/s1; Key:BYPMJBXPNZMNQD-PZJWPPBQSA-N

Zicronapine (/zaɪˈkrɒnəpiːn/ zye-KRON-ə-peen, previously known as Lu 31-130) is an atypical antipsychotic medication formerly under development by H. Lundbeck A/S. In phase II studies zicronapine showed statistically significant separation from placebo and convincing efficacy and safety data when compared to olanzapine.

Zicronapine exhibits monoaminergic activity and has a multi-receptorial profile. In vitro and in vivo it has shown potent antagonistic effects at dopamine D_{1}, D_{2} and serotonin 5HT_{2A} receptors.

In 2014 Lundbeck removed zicronapine from its development portfolio in favor of pursuing the more promising antipsychotic Lu AF35700 (d8-zicronapine; with active metabolite Lu AF356152).

== See also ==
- List of investigational antipsychotics
- Lu AF35700 (d8-zicronapine)
