= LK00764 =

Clinical data
- Drug class: Trace amine-associated receptor 1 (TAAR1) agonist

Identifiers
- IUPAC name: 2-(5-(4'-chloro-[1,1'-biphenyl]-4-yl)-4H-1,2,4-triazol-3-yl)ethan-1-amine
- PubChem CID: 172909030

Chemical and physical data
- Formula: C_{16}H_{15}ClN_{4}
- Molar mass: 298.77 g·mol^{−1}
- 3D model (JSmol): Interactive image
- SMILES: ClC1C=CC(C2C=CC(C3=NN=C(CCN([H])[H])N3[H])=CC=2)=CC=1
- InChI: InChI=1S/C16H15ClN4/c17-14-7-5-12(6-8-14)11-1-3-13(4-2-11)16-19-15(9-10-18)20-21-16/h1-8H,9-10,18H2,(H,19,20,21); Key:LVLXVQHHXDYEJB-UHFFFAOYSA-N

LK00764 is a trace amine-associated receptor 1 (TAAR1) agonist that is being investigated for the treatment of schizophrenia and other psychiatric disorders.

The drug is a highly potent full agonist of the human TAAR1 with an EC_{50} of 4.0 nM and an E_{max} of 101%. It is 30-fold more potent as a TAAR1 agonist than ulotaront (SEP-363856) in vitro. The drug has been found to reverse the hyperlocomotion in dopamine transporter (DAT) knockout mice and the hyperactivity induced by the NMDA receptor antagonist dizocilpine (MK-801) in rats, which are considered to be antipsychotic-like effects. It also attenuates stress-induced hyperthermia in rats, which is thought to be an anxiolytic-like effect. Hence, LK00764 appears to not only be an agonist of the human TAAR1, but also of the mouse and rat TAAR1, although this does not seem to have been assessed in vitro.

LK00764 was first described in the scientific literature by 2018. It is being developed by Accellena. As of February 2025, the drug is in the preclinical research stage of development. LK00764 is structurally distinct from other known TAAR1 agonists but contains β-phenethylamine-like structural features.
