= Frespaciguat =

Experimental drug

Legal status
- Legal status: Investigational

Identifiers
- IUPAC name: 3-[4-[(5S)-4-amino-2-[6-chloro-1-(3,3,4,4,4-pentafluorobutyl)indazol-3-yl]-5-methyl-6-oxo-7H-pyrrolo[2,3-d]pyrimidin-5-yl]phenyl]propanoic acid
- CAS Number: 2101645-33-2
- PubChem CID: 129242560
- ChemSpider: 129394387
- UNII: 6DXN080KGB
- ChEMBL: ChEMBL5944803

Chemical and physical data
- Formula: C_{27}H_{22}ClF_{5}N_{6}O_{3}
- Molar mass: 608.95 g·mol^{−1}
- 3D model (JSmol): Interactive image
- SMILES: O=C(O)CCC1=CC=C(C=C1)C2(C(=O)NC=3N=C(N=C(N)C32)C4=NN(C=5C=C(Cl)C=CC45)CCC(F)(F)C(F)(F)F)C C[C@@]1(C=2C(NC1=O)=NC(=NC2N)C=3C=4C(N(CCC(C(F)(F)F)(F)F)N3)=CC(Cl)=CC4)C5=CC=C(CCC(O)=O)C=C5
- InChI: InChI=1S/C27H22ClF5N6O3/c1-25(14-5-2-13(3-6-14)4-9-18(40)41)19-21(34)35-23(36-22(19)37-24(25)42)20-16-8-7-15(28)12-17(16)39(38-20)11-10-26(29,30)27(31,32)33/h2-3,5-8,12H,4,9-11H2,1H3,(H,40,41)(H3,34,35,36,37,42)/t25-/m0/s1; Key:BAFUFNSAYGCZIC-VWLOTQADSA-N

Frespaciguat (development code MK-5475) is an experimental inhaled soluble guanylate cyclase stimulator developed by Merck for pulmonary arterial hypertension.
