= TAAR1 =

Protein found in humans

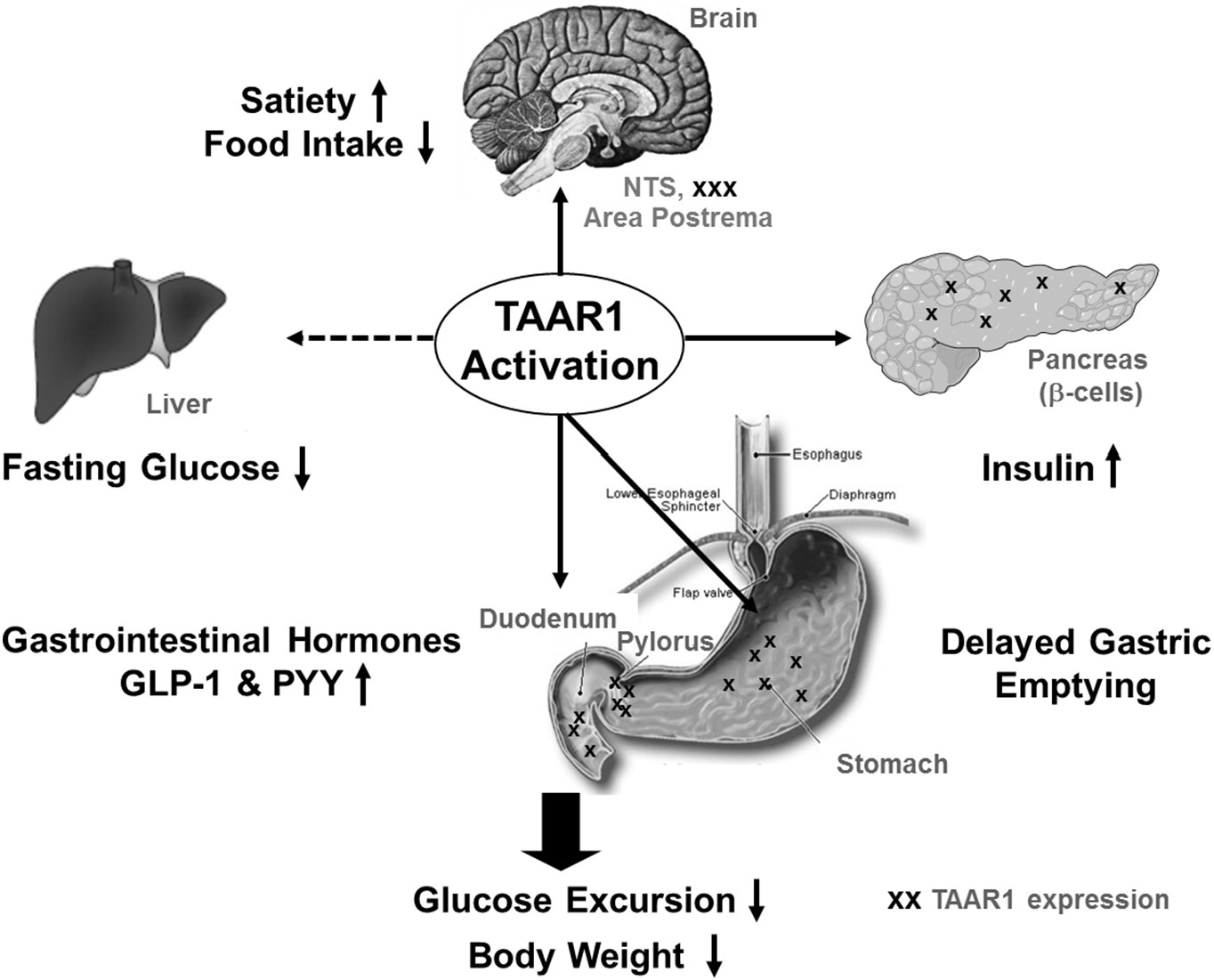

Identifiers
- Aliases: TAAR1, TA1, TAR1, TRAR1, trace amine associated receptor 1, Trace amine receptor
- External IDs: OMIM: 609333; MGI: 2148258; GeneCards: TAAR1

Gene location (Human)
| Chr. | Chromosome 6 (human) |
| Band | 6q23.2 | Start | 132,643,312 bp |
| Band | 6q23.2 | End | 132,659,182 bp |

Gene location (Mouse)
| Chr. | Chromosome 10 (mouse) |
| Band | 10|10 A4 | Start | 23,796,254 bp |
| Band | 10|10 A4 | End | 23,797,367 bp |
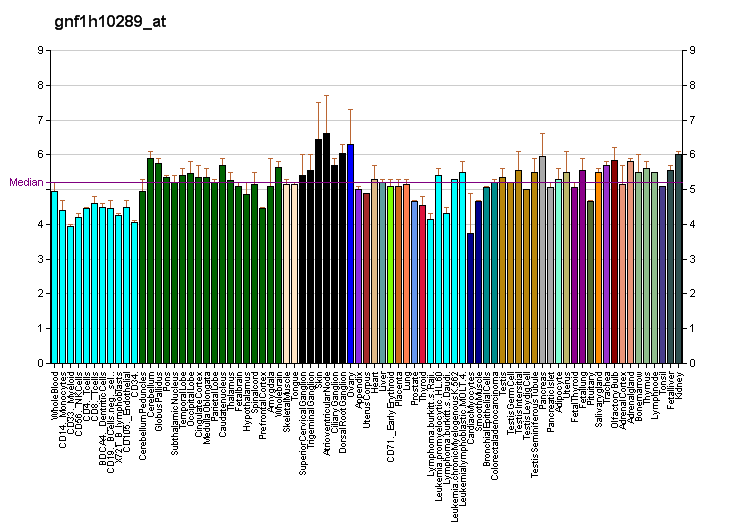
RNA expression pattern
| Bgee | Human / Mouse (ortholog); Top expressed in: islet of Langerhans; right uterine tube; duodenum; endometrium; blood; muscle tissue; smooth muscle tissue; stomach; urinary bladder; body of stomach / Top expressed in: islet of Langerhans; mucosa of small intestine; More reference expression data |
| BioGPS | More reference expression data |
Gene ontology
| Molecular function | G protein-coupled amine receptor activity; signal transducer activity; G protein-coupled receptor activity; trace-amine receptor activity |
| Cellular component | plasma membrane; membrane; integral component of membrane |
| Biological process | signal transduction; G protein-coupled receptor signaling pathway |
Sources:Amigo / QuickGO
Orthologs
| Databases | NCBI: entry; OMA: entry |
| Species | Human | Mouse |
| Entrez | 134864 | 111174 |
| Ensembl | ENSG00000146399 | ENSMUSG00000056379 |
| UniProt | Q96RJ0 | Q923Y8 |
| RefSeq (mRNA) | NM_138327 | NM_053205 |
| RefSeq (protein) | NP_612200 | NP_444435 |
| Location (UCSC) | Chr 6: 132.64 – 132.66 Mb | Chr 10: 23.8 – 23.8 Mb |
| PubMed search |
- Wikidata
| View/Edit Human | View/Edit Mouse |

Trace amine-associated receptor 1 (TAAR1) is a trace amine-associated receptor (TAAR) protein that in humans is encoded by the TAAR1 gene.

TAAR1 is a primarily intracellular amine-activated G_{s}-coupled and G_{q}-coupled G protein-coupled receptor (GPCR) that is primarily expressed in several peripheral organs and cells (e.g., the stomach, small intestine, duodenum, and white blood cells), astrocytes, and in the intracellular milieu within the presynaptic plasma membrane (i.e., axon terminal) of monoamine neurons in the central nervous system (CNS).

TAAR1 is one of six functional human TAARs, which are so named for their ability to bind endogenous amines that occur in tissues at trace concentrations. TAAR1 plays a significant role in regulating neurotransmission in dopamine, norepinephrine, and serotonin neurons in the CNS; it also affects immune system and neuroimmune system function through different mechanisms.

Endogenous ligands of the TAAR1 include trace amines, monoamine neurotransmitters, and certain thyronamines. The trace amines β-phenethylamine, tyramine, tryptamine, and octopamine, the monoamine neurotransmitters dopamine and serotonin, and the thyronamine 3-iodothyronamine (3-IT) are all agonists of the TAAR1 in different species. Other endogenous agonists are also known. A variety of exogenous compounds and drugs are TAAR1 agonists as well, including various phenethylamines, amphetamines, tryptamines, and ergolines, among others. There are marked species differences in the interactions of ligands with the TAAR1, resulting in greatly differing affinities, potencies, and efficacies of TAAR1 ligands between species. Many compounds that are TAAR1 agonists in rodents are much less potent or inactive at the TAAR1 in humans.

A number of selective TAAR1 ligands have been developed, for instance the TAAR1 full agonist RO5256390, the TAAR1 partial agonist RO5263397, and the TAAR1 antagonists EPPTB and RTI-7470-44. Selective TAAR1 agonists are used in scientific research, and a few TAAR1 agonists, such as ulotaront and ralmitaront, are being developed as novel pharmaceutical drugs, for instance to treat schizophrenia and substance use disorder.

== Discovery ==
The TAAR1 was discovered in 2001 by two independent groups, Borowski et al. and Bunzow et al.. To find the genetic variants responsible for TAAR1 synthesis, they used mixtures of oligonucleotides with sequences related to G protein-coupled receptors (GPCRs) of serotonin and dopamine to discover novel DNA sequences in rat genomic DNA and cDNA, which they then amplified and cloned. The resulting sequence was not found in any database and coded for TAAR1. Further characterization of the functional role of TAAR1 and other receptors from this family was performed by other researchers including Raul Gainetdinov and his colleagues.

== Structure ==
TAAR1 shares structural similarities with the class A rhodopsin GPCR subfamily. It has 7 transmembrane domains with short N and C terminal extensions. TAAR1 is 62–96% identical with TAARs2-15, which suggests that the TAAR subfamily has recently evolved; while at the same time, the low degree of similarity between TAAR1 orthologues suggests that they are rapidly evolving. TAAR1 shares a predictive peptide motif with all other TAARs. This motif overlaps with transmembrane domain VII, and its identity is NSXXNPXX[Y,H]XXX[Y,F]XWF. TAAR1 and its homologues have ligand pocket vectors that utilize sets of 35 amino acids known to be involved directly in receptor-ligand interaction.

== Gene ==
All human TAAR genes are located on a single chromosome spanning 109 kb of human chromosome 6q23.1, 192 kb of mouse chromosome 10A4, and 216 kb of rat chromosome 1p12. Each TAAR is derived from a single exon, except for TAAR2, which is coded by two exons. The human TAAR1 gene is thought to be an intronless gene.

== Tissue distribution ==
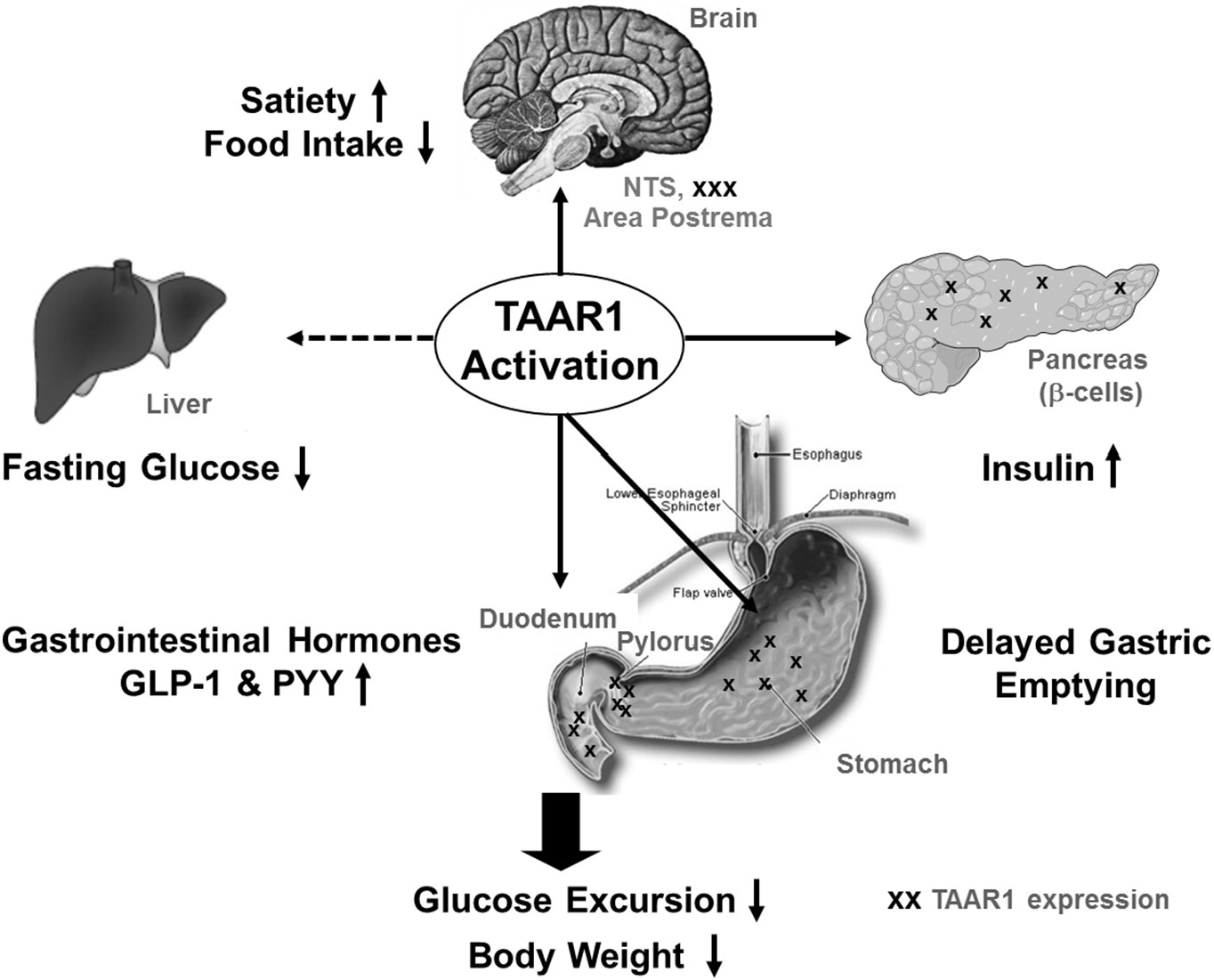
This diagram illustrates how TAAR1 activation induces incretin-like effects through the release of gastrointestinal hormones and influences food intake, blood glucose levels, and insulin release. TAAR1 expression in the periphery is indicated with "x".

To date, TAAR1 has been identified and cloned in five different mammal genomes: human, mouse, rat, monkey, and chimpanzee. In rats, mRNA for TAAR1 is found at low to moderate levels in peripheral tissues like the stomach, kidney, intestines and lungs, and at low levels in the brain. Rhesus monkey Taar1 and human TAAR1 share high sequence similarity, and TAAR1 mRNA is highly expressed in the same important monoaminergic regions of both species. These regions include the dorsal and ventral caudate nucleus, putamen, substantia nigra, nucleus accumbens, ventral tegmental area, locus coeruleus, amygdala, and raphe nucleus. hTAAR1 has also been identified in human astrocytes.

Outside of the human central nervous system, hTAAR1 also occurs as an intracellular receptor and is primarily expressed in the stomach, intestines, duodenum, pancreatic β-cells, and white blood cells. In the duodenum, TAAR1 activation increases glucagon-like peptide-1 (GLP-1) and peptide YY (PYY) release; in the stomach, hTAAR1 activation has been observed to increase somatostatin (growth hormone-inhibiting hormone) secretion from delta cells.

hTAAR1 is the only human trace amine-associated receptor subtype that is not expressed within the human olfactory epithelium.

=== Location within neurons ===
TAAR1 is a primarily intracellular receptor expressed within the presynaptic terminal of monoamine neurons in humans and other animals. In model cell systems, hTAAR1 has extremely poor membrane expression. A method to induce hTAAR1 membrane expression has been used to study its pharmacology via a bioluminescence resonance energy transfer cAMP assay.

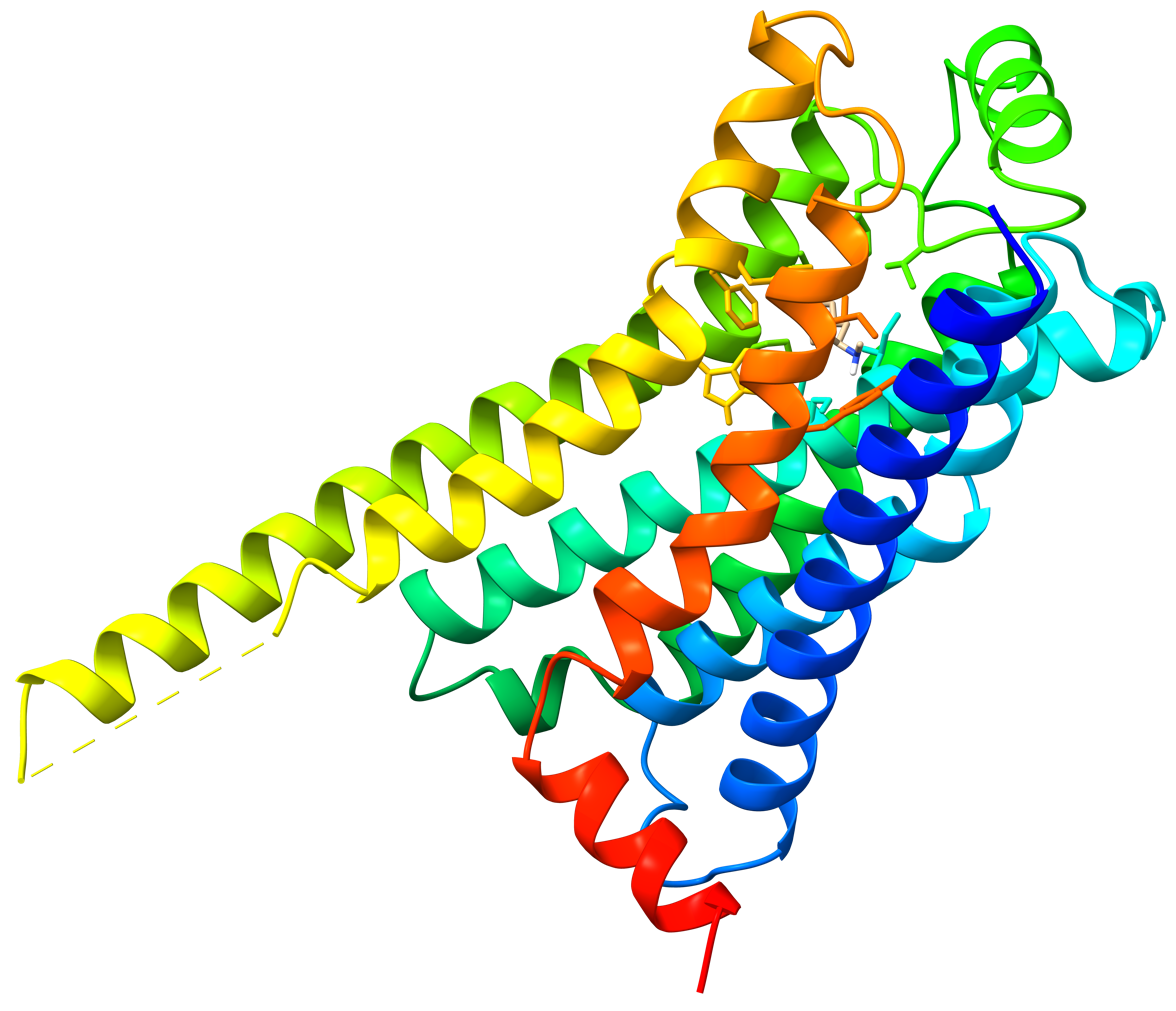
METH bound to hTAAR1

Because TAAR1 is an intracellular receptor in monoamine neurons, exogenous TAAR1 ligands must enter the presynaptic neuron through a membrane transport protein (Note: In dopamine, norepinephrine, and serotonin neurons, the primary membrane transporters are DAT, NET, and SERT respectively.) or be able to diffuse across the presynaptic membrane in order to reach the receptor and produce reuptake inhibition and neurotransmitter efflux. Consequently, the efficacy of a particular TAAR1 ligand in producing these effects in different monoamine neurons is a function of both its binding affinity at TAAR1 and its capacity to move across the presynaptic membrane at each type of neuron. The variability between a TAAR1 ligand's substrate affinity at the various monoamine transporters accounts for much of the difference in its capacity to produce neurotransmitter release and reuptake inhibition in different types of monoamine neurons. E.g., a TAAR1 ligand which can easily pass through the norepinephrine transporter, but not the serotonin transporter, will produce – all else equal – markedly greater TAAR1-induced effects in norepinephrine neurons as compared to serotonin neurons.

A 2016 study found that most TAAR1 was expressed in intracellular membranes near the nucleus and that 2.3% of TAAR1 was expressed at the cell surface. In addition, TAAR1 signaling via the protein kinase A (PKA) pathway was predominantly associated with cell-surface TAAR1.

TAAR1 ligands have also been found to enter neurons by transporters other than the monoamine transporters.

=== Receptor oligomers ===
TAAR1 forms GPCR oligomers with monoamine autoreceptors in neurons in vivo. These and other reported TAAR1 hetero-oligomers include:

- TAAR1 – D2sh (Note: TAAR1–D2sh is a presynaptic heterodimer which involves the relocation of TAAR1 from the intracellular space to D2sh at the plasma membrane, increased D2sh agonist binding affinity, and signal transduction through the calcium–PKC–NFAT pathway and G-protein independent PKB–GSK3 pathway.)
- TAAR1 – α_{2A}
- TAAR1 – TAAR2

[note 2] in the TAAR1- D2sh example shows that TAAR1 can be located at cell membranes, and in the case of enterochromaffin cells in the gut epithelium, TAAR1 can be activated by high doses of dietary 'trace' amines, proximal to vesicles packed with catecholamines, impacting the vagal nerve system and CNS. This raises questions about where T1AM might find TAAR1 and cause similar unexpected nerve firing. TAAR1 gene knockout in mice leads to shifts in microbial community richness and stability.

== Ligands ==
Trace amine-associated receptor 1
- Transduction mechanisms: G_{s}, G_{q}, G_{13}, GIRKs, β-arrestin 2
- Primary endogenous agonists: Tyramine, β-phenylethylamine, octopamine, dopamine
- Agonists: Full agonists: RO5166017, RO5256390, ulotaront, amphetamine, methamphetamine Partial agonists: RO5203648, RO5263397, RO5073012, ralmitaront
- Neutral antagonists: RTI-7470-44
- Inverse agonists: EPPTB
- Positive allosteric modulators: None known
- Negative allosteric modulators: None known

External resources
- IUPHAR/BPS: 364
- DrugBank: Q96RJ0
- HMDB: HMDBP10805

=== Agonists ===
==== Endogenous ====
The known endogenous agonists of the TAAR1 include trace amines like β-phenethylamine (PEA), monoamine neurotransmitters like dopamine, and thyronamines like 3-iodothyronamine (T_{1}AM).

Trace amines are endogenous amines which act as agonists at TAAR1 and are present in extracellular concentrations of 0.1–10 nM in the brain, constituting less than 1% of total biogenic amines in the mammalian nervous system. Some of the human trace amines include tryptamine, phenethylamine (PEA), N-methylphenethylamine, p-tyramine, m-tyramine, N-methyltyramine, p-octopamine, m-octopamine, and synephrine. These share structural similarities with the three common monoamine neurotransmitters: serotonin, dopamine, and norepinephrine. Each ligand has a different potency, measured as increased cyclic AMP (cAMP) concentration after the binding event. The rank order of potency for the primary endogenous ligands at the human TAAR1 is: tyramine > β-phenethylamine > dopamine = octopamine. Tryptamine and histamine also interact with the human TAAR1 with lower potency, whereas serotonin and norepinephrine have been found to be inactive.

Thyronamines are molecular derivatives of thyroid hormone involved in endocrine system function. 3-Iodothyronamine (T_{1}AM) is one of the most potent TAAR1 agonists yet discovered. It also interacts with a number of other targets. Unlike the monoamine neurotransmitters and trace amines, T_{1}A is not a monoamine transporter (MAT) substrate, although it does still weakly interact with the MATs. Activation of TAAR1 by T_{1}AM results in the production of large amounts of cAMP. This effect is coupled with decreased body temperature and cardiac output.

Other endogenous TAAR1 agonists include cyclohexylamine, isoamylamine, and trimethylamine, among others.

==== Exogenous ====
- 2-Aminoindanes
  - 2-Aminoindane (2-AI) – a potent TAAR1 partial or full agonist in rodents, weaker TAAR1 full agonist in humans
  - 5-Iodo-2-aminoindane (5-IAI) – a potent TAAR1 partial or full agonist in rodents, weaker TAAR1 partial agonist in humans
  - MDAI – a potent TAAR1 full agonist in rodents, weaker TAAR1 partial agonist in humans
  - N-Methyl-2-AI (NM-2-AI) – a potent TAAR1 partial or full agonist in rodents, weaker TAAR1 partial agonist in humans
- A-77636 – an experimental dopamine agonist
- Amphetamines (α-methyl-β-phenethylamines)
  - 4-Fluoroamphetamine – a potent TAAR1 partial agonist in rodents, but much less potent in humans
  - 4-Hydroxyamphetamine – an amphetamine metabolite
  - Amphetamine – a potent TAAR1 near-full agonist in rodents, but much less potent in humans
  - Cathinone – weak rodent and human TAAR1 partial agonist
  - MDA – a potent TAAR1 partial agonist in rodents, but much less potent weak partial agonist in humans
  - MDMA – a moderate-efficacy TAAR1 partial agonist in rodents, but much less potent weak partial agonist in humans
  - Methamphetamine – a potent TAAR1 near-full agonist in rodents, but much less potent in humans
  - Phentermine – a weak human TAAR1 near-full agonist
  - Selegiline (L-deprenyl) – a weak mouse TAAR1 partial agonist
  - Solriamfetol – a wakefulness-promoting agent acting as a dual norepinephrine–dopamine reuptake inhibitor (NDRI) and human TAAR1 agonist
- AP163 – a TAAR1 agonist
- Apomorphine – a dopamine agonist and antiparkinsonian agent, potent rodent TAAR1 agonist but not in humans
- Asenapine – an atypical antipsychotic
- Chlorpromazine – a dopamine antagonist and antipsychotic
- Clonidine – an adrenergic agonist and antihypertensive agent, rodent and human TAAR1 agonist
- Cyproheptadine – a serotonin antagonist
- Ergolines and lysergamides
  - Bromocriptine – a dopamine agonist and antiparkinsonian agent
  - Dihydroergotamine – an antimigraine agent
  - Ergometrine (ergonovine) – an obstetric drug
  - Lisuride – a dopamine agonist and antiparkinsonian agent
  - Lysergic acid diethylamide (LSD) – a serotonergic psychedelic and TAAR1 weak partial agonist in rodents but not in humans
  - Metergoline – a prolactin inhibitor
- Fenoldopam – a dopamine agonist and antihypertensive agent
- Fenoterol – an adrenergic agonist
- Guanabenz – an adrenergic agonist and antihypertensive agent, highly potent rodent and human TAAR1 agonist
- Guanfacine – an adrenergic agonist and ADHD medication
- Idazoxan – adrenergic antagonist, potent mouse TAAR1 agonist but much weaker in humans
- Isoprenaline – an adrenergic agonist
- LK00764 – a rodent and human TAAR1 agonist
- LY03020
- MPTP – a monoaminergic neurotoxin
- Naphazoline – an adrenergic agonist
- Nomifensine – a norepinephrine–dopamine reuptake inhibitor (NDRI) and abandoned antidepressant
- o-Phenyl-3-iodotyramine (o-PIT) – a rodent and human TAAR1 agonist
- Oxymetazoline – an adrenergic agonist
- PCC0105004
- Phentolamine – an adrenergic antagonist and rat TAAR1 agonist
- Ralmitaront (RG-7906, RO6889450) – a TAAR1 partial agonist and investigational antipsychotic
- RG-7351 – a TAAR1 partial agonist and abandoned experimental antidepressant
- RG-7410 – a TAAR1 agonist and abandoned experimental antipsychotic
- Ring-methoxylated phenethylamines and amphetamines
  - 2C-B – a serotonergic psychedelic, potent rat TAAR1 partial agonist but much weaker mouse and human TAAR1 partial agonist
  - 2C-E – a serotonergic psychedelic, potent rat TAAR1 partial agonist but much weaker mouse TAAR1 partial agonist and not in humans
  - 2C-T-7 – a serotonergic psychedelic, very high-affinity TAAR1 ligand in mice and rats but not in humans
  - DOB – a very weak human TAAR1 agonist
  - DOET – a weak human TAAR1 agonist
  - DOI – a rat TAAR1 agonist
  - DOM – a rhesus monkey TAAR1 agonist but not in humans
  - Mescaline – a serotonergic psychedelic, potent rodent TAAR1 partial agonist but not in humans
- RO5073012 – a selective rodent and human TAAR1 low-efficacy partial agonist
- RO5166017 – a selective rat and human TAAR1 near-full agonist but partial agonist in mice
- RO5203648 – a selective rodent and human TAAR1 partial agonist
- RO5256390 – a selective rat and human TAAR1 full agonist but partial agonist in mice
- RO5263397 – a selective rodent and human TAAR1 partial agonist
- S18616 – an adrenergic agonist
- Selutaront – selective TAAR1 high-efficacy partial agonist
- Synephrine – an adrenergic agonist
- Tolazoline – an adrenergic antagonist and rat TAAR1 agonist
- Tryptamines
  - Dimethyltryptamine – a serotonergic psychedelic, TAAR1 partial agonist in rodents but not in humans
  - Psilocin – a serotonergic psychedelic, TAAR1 partial agonist in rodents but not in humans
- Ulotaront (SEP-363856, SEP-856) – a human TAAR1 full agonist and investigational antipsychotic

Although amphetamine, methamphetamine, and MDMA are potent TAAR1 agonists in rodents, they are less potent at human TAAR1. For example, based on TAAR1 activation EC50 values, amphetamine and methamphetamine show nanomolar potency at rodent TAAR1, but micromolar potency at human TAAR1. MDMA shows very low potency and efficacy as a human TAAR1 agonist and has been described as inactive. The magnitude of TAAR1-mediated effects of amphetamines in humans at low doses is uncertain. Given the micromolar EC50 values reported for human TAAR1, TAAR1 agonism may be more relevant at high recreational doses. TAAR1 activation can inhibit monoaminergic neuronal firing and is expected to reduce action potential-dependent (vesicular) monoamine release.

While some amphetamines are human TAAR1 agonists, many others are not. As examples, most cathinones (β-ketoamphetamines), such as methcathinone, mephedrone, and flephedrone, as well as other amphetamines, including ephedrine, 4-methylamphetamine (4-MA), para-chloroamphetamine (PCA), para-methoxyamphetamine (PMA), 4-methylthioamphetamine (4-MTA), MDEA, MBDB, 5-APDB, and 5-MAPDB, are inactive as human TAAR1 agonists. Many other drugs acting as monoamine releasing agents (MRAs) are also inactive as human TAAR1 agonists, for instance piperazines like benzylpiperazine (BZP), meta-chlorophenylpiperazine (mCPP), and 3-trifluoromethylphenylpiperazine (TFMPP), as well as the alkylamine methylhexanamine (DMAA). The negligible TAAR1 agonism with most cathinones might serve to enhance their effects and misuse potential as MRAs compared to their amphetamine counterparts.

Monoaminergic activity enhancers (MAEs), such as selegiline, benzofuranylpropylaminopentane (BPAP), and phenylpropylaminopentane (PPAP), have been claimed to act as TAAR1 agonists to mediate their MAE effects, but TAAR1 agonism for BPAP and PPAP has yet to be assessed or confirmed. Selegiline is only a weak agonist of the mouse TAAR1, with dramatically lower potency than amphetamine or methamphetamine, and does not seem to have been assessed at the human TAAR1.

=== Antagonists and inverse agonists ===
- Compound 22 – a very low-potency and non-selective TAAR1 antagonist
- EPPTB (RO5212773) – a selective mouse TAAR1 inverse agonist but far less potent rat and human TAAR1 neutral antagonist
- RTI-7470-44 – a potent and selective human TAAR1 neutral antagonist but far less potent mouse and rat TAAR1 antagonist

A few other less well-known TAAR1 antagonists have also been discovered and characterized.

RO5073012 is an antagonist-esque weak partial agonist of the rodent and human TAAR1 (E_{max} = 24–35%). Similarly, MDA and MDMA are weak to very weak partial agonists or antagonists of the human TAAR1 (E_{max} = 11% and 26%, respectively), albeit with very low potency.

It has been claimed that rasagiline may act as a TAAR1 antagonist, but TAAR1 interactions have yet to be assessed or confirmed for this agent.

== Function ==
Phenethylamine and amphetamine in a TAAR1-localized dopamine neuron
Amphetamine enters the presynaptic neuron across the neuronal membrane or through DAT. Once inside, it binds to TAAR1 or enters synaptic vesicles through VMAT2. When amphetamine enters synaptic vesicles through VMAT2, it collapses the vesicular pH gradient, which in turn causes dopamine to be released into the cytosol (light tan-colored area) through VMAT2. When amphetamine binds to TAAR1, it reduces the firing rate of the dopamine neuron via G protein-coupled inwardly rectifying potassium channels (GIRKs) and activates protein kinase A (PKA) and protein kinase C (PKC), which subsequently phosphorylate DAT. PKA phosphorylation causes DAT to withdraw into the presynaptic neuron (internalize) and cease transport. PKC-phosphorylated DAT may either operate in reverse or, like PKA-phosphorylated DAT, internalize and cease transport. Amphetamine is also known to increase intracellular calcium, an effect which is associated with DAT phosphorylation through a CAMKIIα-dependent pathway, in turn producing dopamine efflux.

=== Monoaminergic systems ===
Before the discovery of TAAR1, trace amines were believed to serve very limited functions. They were thought to induce noradrenaline release from sympathetic nerve endings and compete for catecholamine or serotonin binding sites on cognate receptors, transporters, and storage sites. Today, they are believed to play a much more dynamic role by regulating monoaminergic systems in the brain.

One of the downstream effects of active TAAR1 is to increase cAMP in the presynaptic cell via Gα_{s} G-protein activation of adenylyl cyclase. This alone can have a multitude of cellular consequences. A main function of the cAMP may be to up-regulate the expression of trace amines in the cell cytoplasm. These amines would then activate intracellular TAAR1. Monoamine autoreceptors (e.g., D_{2} short, presynaptic α_{2}, and presynaptic 5-HT_{1A}) have the opposite effect of TAAR1, and together these receptors provide a regulatory system for monoamines. Notably, amphetamine and trace amines possess high binding affinities for TAAR1, but not for monoamine autoreceptors. The effect of TAAR1 agonists on monoamine transporters in the brain appears to be site-specific. Imaging studies indicate that monoamine reuptake inhibition by amphetamine and trace amines is dependent upon the presence of TAAR1 co-localization in the associated monoamine neurons. As of 2010, co-localization of TAAR1 and the dopamine transporter (DAT) has been visualized in rhesus monkeys, but co-localization of TAAR1 with the norepinephrine transporter (NET) and the serotonin transporter (SERT) has only been evidenced by messenger RNA (mRNA) expression.

In neurons with co-localized TAAR1, TAAR1 agonists can regulate monoamine concentrations in the synaptic cleft through effects on neuronal excitability and monoamine transporter function. Through direct activation of G protein-coupled inwardly-rectifying potassium channels (GIRKs), TAAR1 can reduce the firing rate of dopamine neurons, in turn preventing a hyper-dopaminergic state. Amphetamine and trace amines can enter the presynaptic neuron either through DAT or by diffusing across the neuronal membrane directly. As a consequence of DAT uptake, amphetamine and trace amines produce competitive reuptake inhibition at the transporter. Upon entering the presynaptic neuron, these compounds activate can activate TAAR1 which, through protein kinase A (PKA), protein kinase C (PKC), and Ras Homolog family member A (RhoA) signaling, causes DAT phosphorylation. Activation of any these intracellular signaling pathways can result in DAT internalization (non-competitive reuptake inhibition), but PKC-mediated phosphorylation alone induces reverse transporter function (dopamine efflux).

Electrophysiological studies have linked TAAR1 activation to reduced excitability of midbrain dopamine neurons, including increased spontaneous firing in TAAR1 gene knockout animals and TAAR1-dependent suppression of neuronal firing in wild-type tissue. A review noted that reduced VTA dopamine neuron firing would be expected to decrease extracellular dopamine, whereas TAAR1-mediated regulation of DAT function, including transporter internalization and reverse transport, would be expected to increase extracellular dopamine. To address comparatively limited work on whether TAAR1 agonists affect synaptic dopamine via DAT, a 2025 study on TAAR1-mediated regulation of transporter function compared amphetamine with three other TAAR1 agonists (RO5166017, RO5256390, and ulotaront) and reported that these TAAR1 agonists produce distinct effects on DAT function. In HEK 293T cells stably expressing human TAAR1 (hTAAR1) and human DAT (hDAT), RO5166017 and RO5256390 were shown to bind to hDAT and competitively inhibited hDAT-mediated dopamine reuptake, whereas ulotaront did not show detectable hDAT binding. In the same cell system, RO5256390 and ulotaront reduced dopamine reuptake, while RO5166017 increased reuptake, and these reuptake changes were hTAAR1-dependent. RO5166017 increased hDAT expression at the plasma membrane and potentiated amphetamine-induced reverse transport in a hTAAR1-dependent manner, whereas RO5256390 and ulotaront did not alter amphetamine-induced hDAT efflux. The authors concluded that although these hTAAR1 agonists are relatively consistent in their effects on reducing VTA dopamine neuron firing, they are less consistent in effects on hDAT uptake and membrane expression, and only amphetamine induced hDAT-mediated dopamine efflux.

=== Immune system ===
Expression of TAAR1 on lymphocytes is associated with activation of lymphocyte immuno-characteristics. In the immune system, TAAR1 transmits signals through active PKA and PKC phosphorylation cascades. In a 2012 study, Panas et al. observed that methamphetamine had these effects, suggesting that, in addition to brain monoamine regulation, amphetamine-related compounds may have an effect on the immune system. A recent paper showed that, along with TAAR1, TAAR2 is required for full activity of trace amines in PMN cells.

Phytohaemagglutinin upregulates hTAAR1 mRNA in circulating leukocytes; in these cells, TAAR1 activation mediates leukocyte chemotaxis toward TAAR1 agonists. TAAR1 agonists (specifically, trace amines) have also been shown to induce interleukin 4 secretion in T-cells and immunoglobulin E (IgE) secretion in B cells.

Astrocyte-localized TAAR1 regulates EAAT2 levels and function in these cells; this has been implicated in methamphetamine-induced pathologies of the neuroimmune system.

== Clinical significance ==
Low phenethylamine (PEA) concentration in the brain is associated with major depressive disorder, and high concentrations are associated with schizophrenia. Low PEA levels and under-activation of TAAR1 also appears to be associated with ADHD. It is hypothesized that insufficient PEA levels result in TAAR1 inactivation and overzealous monoamine uptake by transporters, possibly resulting in depression. Some antidepressants function by inhibiting monoamine oxidase (MAO), which increases the concentration of trace amines, which is speculated to increase TAAR1 activation in presynaptic cells. Decreased PEA metabolism has been linked to schizophrenia, a logical finding considering excess PEA would result in over-activation of TAAR1 and prevention of monoamine transporter function. Mutations in region q23.1 of human chromosome 6 – the same chromosome that codes for TAAR1 – have been linked to schizophrenia.

Medical reviews from February 2015 and 2016 noted that TAAR1-selective ligands have significant therapeutic potential for treating psychostimulant addictions (e.g., cocaine, amphetamine, methamphetamine, etc.). Despite wide distribution outside of the CNS and PNS, TAAR1 does not affect hematological functions and the regulation of thyroid hormones across different stages of ageing. Such data represent that future TAAR1-based therapies should exert little hematological effect and thus will likely have a good safety profile.

=== Research ===
A large candidate gene association study published in September 2011 found significant differences in TAAR1 allele frequencies between a cohort of fibromyalgia patients and a chronic pain-free control group, suggesting this gene may play an important role in the pathophysiology of the condition; this possibly presents a target for therapeutic intervention.

In preclinical research on rats, TAAR1 activation in pancreatic cells promotes insulin, peptide YY, and GLP-1 secretion; therefore, TAAR1 is potentially a biological target for the treatment of obesity and diabetes.

Lack of TAAR1 significantly increase mice aggressive behavior, but does not affect sexual motivation and routine lipid and metabolic blood biochemical parameters, suggesting that future TAAR1-based therapies should have a favorable safety profile. Moreover, agonist RO5263397 reduces social aggression in brain serotonin-deficient tryptophan hydroxylase 2 knockout rats. This establishes the biological plausibility of TAAR1 agonism as a treatment for aggressive behavior.

== See also ==
- Locomotor activity § TAAR1 modulators
