= Lu AF35700 =

Clinical data
- Other names: Lu-AF35700; Lu-AF-35700; Deuterated zicronapine; Deuzicronapine; d8-Zicronapine; Zicronapine-D8
- Routes of administration: Oral
- Drug class: Dopamine receptor antagonist; Serotonin receptor antagonist
- ATC code: None

Identifiers
- IUPAC name: 4-[(1R,3S)-6-chloro-3-(2,3,4,5,6-pentadeuteriophenyl)-2,3-dihydro-1H-inden-1-yl]-2,2-dimethyl-1-(trideuteriomethyl)piperazine
- CAS Number: 1416227-06-9
- PubChem CID: 71498955
- ChemSpider: 52085147
- UNII: 2K038J69PK
- ChEMBL: ChEMBL5191141

Chemical and physical data
- Formula: C_{22}H_{27}ClN_{2}
- Molar mass: 354.92 g·mol^{−1}
- 3D model (JSmol): Interactive image
- SMILES: [2H]C1=C(C(=C(C(=C1[2H])[2H])[C@@H]2C[C@H](C3=C2C=CC(=C3)Cl)N4CCN(C(C4)(C)C)C([2H])([2H])[2H])[2H])[2H]
- InChI: InChI=1S/C22H27ClN2/c1-22(2)15-25(12-11-24(22)3)21-14-19(16-7-5-4-6-8-16)18-10-9-17(23)13-20(18)21/h4-10,13,19,21H,11-12,14-15H2,1-3H3/t19-,21+/m0/s1/i3D3,4D,5D,6D,7D,8D; Key:BYPMJBXPNZMNQD-WHCYFCLHSA-N

Lu AF35700, also known as d8-zicronapine, is an experimental antipsychotic which was under development for the treatment of schizophrenia and schizoaffective disorder but was never marketed. It is taken orally.

The drug is a non-selective dopamine receptor antagonist, including of the dopamine D_{1}, D_{2}, D_{3}, D_{4}, and D_{5} receptors (K_{i} = 0.56 nM, 4.1 nM, 16 nM, 6.8 nM, and 0.37 nM, respectively). In addition, it is an antagonist of the serotonin 5-HT_{2A}, 5-HT_{2B}, 5-HT_{2C}, and 5-HT_{6} receptors (K_{i} = 0.96 nM, 0.4 nM, 1.5 nM, and 0.59 nM, respectively). The drug also shows affinity for and acts as an antagonist of various adrenergic receptors. It is not an antagonist of the muscarinic acetylcholine receptors, but does show high affinity for the histamine H_{1} receptor (K_{i} = 4 nM). Lu AF35700 is unusual among antipsychotics in that it shows marked and in fact preferential blockade of the dopamine D_{1}-like receptors in addition to the dopamine D_{2}-like receptors. This has conferred it with unique preclinical pharmacological effects and potential therapeutic benefits.

The drug is an octadeuterated isotopologue of zicronapine (Lu 31-130). Lu AF36152 is the N-desmethyl active metabolite of Lu AF35700.

Lu AF35700 was under development by Lundbeck A/S. It reached phase 3 clinical trials for schizophrenia and phase 1 trials for schizoaffective disorder prior to the discontinuation of its development. The development of the drug appears to have been stopped by 2019. Although it demonstrated clinical antipsychotic effectiveness, the drug failed to differentiate itself from conventional antipsychotics like olanzapine and risperidone for treatment-resistant schizophrenia in phase 3 trials.

== See also ==
- List of investigational antipsychotics
- List of investigational bipolar disorder drugs
- Zicronapine (Lu 31-130)
