= JNJ-39393406 =

Chemical compound

Clinical data
- Routes of administration: By mouth
- Drug class: Antinicotinic

Identifiers
- IUPAC name: 3-[3-[(2,2-Difluoro-1,3-benzodioxol-5-yl)amino]-5-pyridin-4-yl-1,2,4-triazol-1-yl]-N,N-dimethylpropanamide
- CAS Number: 953428-73-4
- PubChem CID: 16755766
- ChemSpider: 28424208
- UNII: T930SOU82P
- ChEMBL: ChEMBL3545291
- CompTox Dashboard (EPA): DTXSID401110616

Chemical and physical data
- Formula: C_{19}H_{18}F_{2}N_{6}O_{3}
- Molar mass: 416.389 g·mol^{−1}
- 3D model (JSmol): Interactive image
- SMILES: CN(C)C(=O)CCN1C(=NC(=N1)NC2=CC3=C(C=C2)OC(O3)(F)F)C4=CC=NC=C4
- InChI: InChI=1S/C19H18F2N6O3/c1-26(2)16(28)7-10-27-17(12-5-8-22-9-6-12)24-18(25-27)23-13-3-4-14-15(11-13)30-19(20,21)29-14/h3-6,8-9,11H,7,10H2,1-2H3,(H,23,25); Key:IURMHZBQEYNQOH-UHFFFAOYSA-N

JNJ-39393406 is an experimental medication which is under development by Janssen Pharmaceutica, a division of Johnson & Johnson, for the treatment of depressive disorders and smoking withdrawal. It acts as a selective positive allosteric modulator of the α7 nicotinic acetylcholine receptor (nAChR). It does not act on the α4β2 or α3β4 nAChRs or the serotonin 5-HT_{3} receptor, and does not interact with a panel of 62 other receptors and enzymes. The drug has been found to lower the agonist and nicotine threshold for activation of the α7 nAChR by 10- to 20-fold and to increase the maximum agonist response of the α7 nAChR by 17- to 20-fold.

As of February 2018, JNJ-39393406 is in phase II clinical trials for both depressive disorders and smoking withdrawal. It was also under investigation for the treatment of schizophrenia and Alzheimer's disease, but development for these indications was discontinued.

== See also ==
- List of investigational antidepressants
- List of investigational antipsychotics
