= SDZ-PSD-958 =

Clinical data
- Other names: SDZ PSD 958
- Routes of administration: Unknown
- Drug class: Dopamine D_{1} and D_{5} receptor antagonist
- ATC code: None

Identifiers
- IUPAC name: (4aR,10aR)-4-(4-chloro-2-methylphenyl)-1-methyl-2,3,4a,5,10,10a-hexahydrobenzo[g]quinoxalin-6-ol
- PubChem CID: 9906075
- ChemSpider: 8081728

Chemical and physical data
- Formula: C_{20}H_{23}ClN_{2}O
- Molar mass: 342.87 g·mol^{−1}
- 3D model (JSmol): Interactive image
- SMILES: CC1=C(C=CC(=C1)Cl)N2CCN([C@H]3[C@H]2CC4=C(C3)C=CC=C4O)C
- InChI: InChI=1S/C20H23ClN2O/c1-13-10-15(21)6-7-17(13)23-9-8-22(2)18-11-14-4-3-5-20(24)16(14)12-19(18)23/h3-7,10,18-19,24H,8-9,11-12H2,1-2H3/t18-,19-/m1/s1; Key:VCFAZLUWIBQVRD-RTBURBONSA-N

SDZ-PSD-958 is a selective dopamine D_{1} and D_{5} receptor antagonist which was under development for the treatment of psychotic disorders but was never marketed. Its route of administration is unknown. The drug has very high affinity for the D_{1}-like receptors (K_{i} = 0.16–0.20 nM) and more than 400-fold selectivity for these receptors over the D_{2}-like receptors. It has been found to produce hypolocomotion, inhibit dizocilpine (MK-801)-induced hyperlocomotion, inhibit apomorphine-induced rearing, reverse the prolongation of novelty-induced hyperlocomotion by the dopamine D_{1} receptor agonist CY 208-243, not induce catalepsy, and only weakly inhibit apomorphine-induced stereotyped gnawing in rodents. SDZ-PSD-958 was under development by Novartis. It reached the preclinical research stage of development by 1997, whereas no recent development was reported by 2001.

== See also ==
- List of investigational antipsychotics
