= DHA-clozapine =

Chemical compound

Clinical data
- Trade names: Clozaprexin
- Other names: Docosahexaenoyl clozapine
- ATC code: none

Legal status
- Legal status: US: Investigational New Drug

Identifiers
- IUPAC name: (4Z,7Z,10Z,13Z,16Z,19Z)-1-[3-chloro-6-(4-methylpiperazin-1-yl)benzo[b][1,4]benzodiazepin-11-yl]docosa-4,7,10,13,16,19-hexaen-1-one
- CAS Number: 225916-82-5
- PubChem CID: 9852332
- ChemSpider: 8028044
- UNII: Q5Q5VSN8DL
- CompTox Dashboard (EPA): DTXSID001027067

Chemical and physical data
- Formula: C_{40}H_{49}ClN_{4}O
- Molar mass: 637.31 g·mol^{−1}
- 3D model (JSmol): Interactive image
- SMILES: Clc1ccc2N(C(=O)CC\C=C/C\C=C/C\C=C/C\C=C/C\C=C/C\C=C/CC)c4ccccc4C(=N/c2c1)\N3CCN(C)CC3
- InChI: InChI=1S/C40H49ClN4O/c1-3-4-5-6-7-8-9-10-11-12-13-14-15-16-17-18-19-20-21-26-39(46)45-37-25-23-22-24-35(37)40(44-31-29-43(2)30-32-44)42-36-33-34(41)27-28-38(36)45/h4-5,7-8,10-11,13-14,16-17,19-20,22-25,27-28,33H,3,6,9,12,15,18,21,26,29-32H2,1-2H3/b5-4-,8-7-,11-10-,14-13-,17-16-,20-19-; Key:RPSJOJIGGSRDMO-JDPCYWKWSA-N

DHA-clozapine (tentative trade name Clozaprexin) is an atypical antipsychotic drug candidate that was created and originally tested by chemists at Protarga, a small pharmaceutical in Pennsylvania, and scientists at Harvard University.

It is a prodrug of clozapine; the fatty acid docosahexaenoic acid (DHA) was added to clozapine in order to increase penetration of the blood–brain barrier.

Protarga was purchased by Luitpold Pharmaceuticals in 2003 and development was discontinued in 2007.

== See also ==
- List of investigational antipsychotics
