= F-17464 =

Clinical data
- Other names: F17464; F-17,464
- Routes of administration: Oral
- Drug class: Dopamine D_{3} receptor antagonist; Serotonin 5-HT_{1A} receptor agonist
- ATC code: None

Pharmacokinetic data
- Elimination half-life: 1.32 hours

Identifiers
- IUPAC name: N-[3-[4-[4-(8-oxo-[1,3]dioxolo[4,5-g]chromen-7-yl)butyl]piperazin-1-yl]phenyl]methanesulfonamide
- CAS Number: 1268334-25-3
- PubChem CID: 51000839
- ChemSpider: 129324186
- UNII: TDB64DDB5X
- ChEMBL: ChEMBL5316163

Chemical and physical data
- Formula: C_{25}H_{29}N_{3}O_{6}S
- Molar mass: 499.58 g·mol^{−1}
- 3D model (JSmol): Interactive image
- SMILES: CS(=O)(=O)NC1=CC(=CC=C1)N2CCN(CC2)CCCCC3=COC4=CC5=C(C=C4C3=O)OCO5
- InChI: InChI=1S/C25H29N3O6S/c1-35(30,31)26-19-6-4-7-20(13-19)28-11-9-27(10-12-28)8-3-2-5-18-16-32-22-15-24-23(33-17-34-24)14-21(22)25(18)29/h4,6-7,13-16,26H,2-3,5,8-12,17H2,1H3; Key:KLOYLPZTHLSRRB-UHFFFAOYSA-N

F-17464 is a dopamine D_{3} receptor antagonist and serotonin 5-HT_{1A} receptor partial agonist which was under development for the treatment of schizophrenia but was never marketed. It is taken orally.

The drug's affinities (K_{i}) have been found to be 0.17 nM for the dopamine D_{3} receptor, 0.16 nM for the serotonin 5-HT_{1A} receptor, and 8.9 to 12.1 nM for the dopamine D_{2} receptor, with more than 50-fold selectivity for the dopamine D_{3} receptor over the dopamine D_{2} receptor. It also shows a much slower dissociation rate from the dopamine D_{3} receptor than from the dopamine D_{2} receptor. The drug possesses low affinity for the serotonin 5-HT_{2A} and 5-HT_{2C} receptors (K_{i} = 437 nM and 1,995 nM, respectively). F-17464 showed more than 80% occupancy of the dopamine D_{3} receptor and only 20% occupancy of the dopamine D_{2} receptor with positron emission tomography (PET) imaging in humans. It inhibited amphetamine- and dizocilpine (MK-801)-induced hyperlocomotion in rodents.

F-17464 was first described in the scientific literature by 2015. It was under development by Pierre Fabre. The drug reached phase 2 clinical trials for schizophrenia prior to the discontinuation of its development in 2021. The findings of a phase 2 trial have been published.

== See also ==
- List of investigational antipsychotics
