= LY03020 =

Clinical data
- Other names: LY-03020; LPM787000048; LPM-787000048
- Routes of administration: Oral
- Drug class: Serotonin 5-HT_{2C} receptor agonist
- ATC code: None

LY03020 is a dual serotonin 5-HT_{2C} receptor agonist and trace amine-associated receptor 1 (TAAR1) agonist which is under development for the treatment of schizophrenia and Alzheimer's disease. It is taken orally as a controlled-release formulation. The drug is under development by Luye Pharma Group. As of February 2026, it is in phase 1 clinical trials for both indications. The chemical structure of LY03020 does not yet appear to have been disclosed.

== See also ==
- Serotonin 5-HT_{2C} receptor agonist
- List of investigational antipsychotics
