= Batelapine =

Chemical compound

Clinical data
- Other names: CGS-13429
- Routes of administration: By mouth
- ATC code: None

Pharmacokinetic data
- Elimination half-life: 8.1 Hours

Identifiers
- IUPAC name: 2-methyl-5-(4-methylpiperazin-1-yl)-11H-[1,2,4]triazolo[1,5-c][1,3]benzodiazepine
- CAS Number: 95634-82-5
- PubChem CID: 60717
- ChemSpider: 6721
- UNII: P71TE299SG
- ChEMBL: ChEMBL2110765
- CompTox Dashboard (EPA): DTXSID50241906

Chemical and physical data
- Formula: C_{16}H_{20}N_{6}
- Molar mass: 296.378 g·mol^{−1}
- 3D model (JSmol): Interactive image
- SMILES: CC1=NN2C(=N1)CC3=CC=CC=C3N=C2N4CCN(CC4)C
- InChI: InChI=1S/C16H20N6/c1-12-17-15-11-13-5-3-4-6-14(13)18-16(22(15)19-12)21-9-7-20(2)8-10-21/h3-6H,7-11H2,1-2H3; Key:PUHMYHQVPODHCZ-UHFFFAOYSA-N

Batelapine (developmental code name CGS-13429) is a structural analogue of clozapine which was investigated as a potential antipsychotic.

== See also ==
- List of investigational antipsychotics
