= DSP-0038 =

Clinical data
- Other names: DSP0038
- Drug class: Serotonin 5-HT_{1A} receptor agonist and 5-HT_{2A} receptor antagonist
- ATC code: None

DSP-0038 is a serotonin receptor modulator that acts as a 5-HT2A receptor antagonist and 5-HT1A receptor agonist. It is under development for psychosis related to Alzheimer's disease. The drug was developed using artificial intelligence that enabled it to proceed from discovery to Phase I trial in one year, compared to an industry average of 4 to 6 years.

== See also ==
- List of investigational antipsychotics
