= Olinciguat =

Chemical compound

Clinical data
- Other names: IW-1701

Legal status
- Legal status: Investigational

Identifiers
- IUPAC name: (2R)-3,3,3-Trifluoro-2-[[[5-fluoro-2-[1-[(2-fluorophenyl)methyl]-5-(1,2-oxazol-3-yl)pyrazol-3-yl]pyrimidin-4-yl]amino]methyl]-2-hydroxypropanamide
- CAS Number: 1628732-62-6
- PubChem CID: 90445883
- IUPHAR/BPS: 10213
- DrugBank: DB15238
- ChemSpider: 64835205
- UNII: PD5F4ZXD21
- KEGG: D11475
- ChEMBL: ChEMBL4297616

Chemical and physical data
- Formula: C_{21}H_{16}F_{5}N_{7}O_{3}
- Molar mass: 509.397 g·mol^{−1}
- 3D model (JSmol): Interactive image
- SMILES: C1=CC=C(C(=C1)CN2C(=CC(=N2)C3=NC=C(C(=N3)NC[C@@](C(=O)N)(C(F)(F)F)O)F)C4=NOC=C4)F
- InChI: InChI=1S/C21H16F5N7O3/c22-12-4-2-1-3-11(12)9-33-16(14-5-6-36-32-14)7-15(31-33)18-28-8-13(23)17(30-18)29-10-20(35,19(27)34)21(24,25)26/h1-8,35H,9-10H2,(H2,27,34)(H,28,29,30)/t20-/m1/s1; Key:YWQFJNWMWZMXRW-HXUWFJFHSA-N

Olinciguat (IW-1701) is a soluble guanylate cyclase stimulator that was in development for sickle cell anemia. After receiving orphan drug status in 2018 and completing a phase II trial, its development for sickle cell anemia was discontinued in 2020.
