= SDZ 208-912 =

Clinical data
- Other names: SDZ-208912; SDZ-HDC-912; SDZ-MAR-327; N-(2-Chloro-6-methylergoline-8α-yl)-2,2-dimethylpropanamide
- Routes of administration: Unknown
- Drug class: Dopamine D_{2} receptor partial agonist
- ATC code: None

Identifiers
- IUPAC name: N-[(6aR,9S,10aR)-5-chloro-7-methyl-6,6a,8,9,10,10a-hexahydro-4H-indolo[4,3-fg]quinolin-9-yl]-2,2-dimethylpropanamide
- CAS Number: 101000-49-1 120478-65-1
- PubChem CID: 58145
- ChemSpider: 52381
- UNII: 60LR4NX4AK
- CompTox Dashboard (EPA): DTXSID70923434

Chemical and physical data
- Formula: C_{20}H_{26}ClN_{3}O
- Molar mass: 359.90 g·mol^{−1}
- 3D model (JSmol): Interactive image
- SMILES: CC(C)(C)C(=O)N[C@H]1C[C@H]2[C@@H](CC3=C(NC4=CC=CC2=C34)Cl)N(C1)C
- InChI: InChI=1S/C20H26ClN3O/c1-20(2,3)19(25)22-11-8-13-12-6-5-7-15-17(12)14(18(21)23-15)9-16(13)24(4)10-11/h5-7,11,13,16,23H,8-10H2,1-4H3,(H,22,25)/t11-,13+,16+/m0/s1; Key:QXOFQMUQMXGKGQ-NORZTCDRSA-N

SDZ 208-912 is an experimental antipsychotic of the ergoline family which was under development for the treatment of psychotic disorders but was never marketed. Its route of administration is unknown.

The drug shows high affinity for the dopamine D_{2} receptor, α_{1}-adrenergic receptor, and serotonin 5-HT_{1A} receptor, as well as somewhat lower affinity for the dopamine D_{1} receptor, α_{2}-adrenergic receptor, and serotonin 5-HT_{2} receptor. It acts as a weak partial agonist of the dopamine D_{2} and D_{3} receptors. SDZ 208-912 inhibits dextroamphetamine-induced hyperlocomotion and apomorphine-induced compulsive gnawing in rodents. It has a low or negligible propensity for causing catalepsy. The drug strongly suppresses prolactin levels and produces antiparkinsonian-like effects in rodents.

SDZ 208-912 was first described in the scientific literature by 1988. It was under development by Novartis. The drug reached phase 2 clinical trials for psychotic disorders in the United States and European Union prior to the discontinuation of its development in 1998.

== See also ==
- List of investigational antipsychotics
- Terguride (transdihydrolisuride)
