= Plazinemdor =

Clinical data
- Other names: CAD-9303; CAD9303
- Routes of administration: Oral
- Drug class: NMDA receptor positive allosteric modulator
- ATC code: None

Identifiers
- IUPAC name: 5-(3-chloro-4-fluorophenyl)-7-cyclopropyl-3-[2-(3-fluoro-3-methylazetidin-1-yl)-2-oxoethyl]pyrrolo[2,3-d]pyrimidin-4-one
- CAS Number: 2378285-59-5
- PubChem CID: 146315728
- DrugBank: DB21493
- ChemSpider: 115007143
- UNII: S0CE8P9OKW
- ChEMBL: ChEMBL4650459

Chemical and physical data
- Formula: C_{21}H_{19}ClF_{2}N_{4}O_{2}
- Molar mass: 432.86 g·mol^{−1}
- 3D model (JSmol): Interactive image
- SMILES: CC1(CN(C1)C(=O)CN2C=NC3=C(C2=O)C(=CN3C4CC4)C5=CC(=C(C=C5)F)Cl)F
- InChI: InChI=1S/C21H19ClF2N4O2/c1-21(24)9-27(10-21)17(29)8-26-11-25-19-18(20(26)30)14(7-28(19)13-3-4-13)12-2-5-16(23)15(22)6-12/h2,5-7,11,13H,3-4,8-10H2,1H3; Key:NULHGWQIRTXKAY-UHFFFAOYSA-N

Plazinemdor (INN; developmental code name CAD-9303) is an NMDA receptor positive allosteric modulator which is or was under development for the treatment of schizophrenia. It is taken orally. The drug is intended for treatment of the negative and cognitive symptoms of schizophrenia. Plazinemdor was originated by Cadent Therapeutics and is or was under development by Novartis. As of April 2023, no recent development has been reported for schizophrenia.

== See also ==
- List of investigational antipsychotics
