= Luvadaxistat =

Chemical compound

Clinical data
- Other names: NBI-1065844; NBI1065844; TAK-831; TAK831

Legal status
- Legal status: Investigational

Identifiers
- IUPAC name: 6-[2-[4-(Trifluoromethyl)phenyl]ethyl]-1,2-dihydropyridazine-3,4-dione
- CAS Number: 1425511-32-5
- PubChem CID: 71270546
- DrugBank: DB16067
- ChemSpider: 29419992
- UNII: 76IC00YRVR
- KEGG: D11981
- ChEMBL: ChEMBL2338801

Chemical and physical data
- Formula: C_{13}H_{11}F_{3}N_{2}O_{2}
- Molar mass: 284.238 g·mol^{−1}
- 3D model (JSmol): Interactive image
- SMILES: C1=CC(=CC=C1CCC2=CC(=O)C(=O)NN2)C(F)(F)F
- InChI: InChI=1S/C13H11F3N2O2/c14-13(15,16)9-4-1-8(2-5-9)3-6-10-7-11(19)12(20)18-17-10/h1-2,4-5,7H,3,6H2,(H,17,19)(H,18,20); Key:QBQMUMMSYHUDFM-UHFFFAOYSA-N

Luvadaxistat (INN, USAN; NBI-1065844, TAK-831) is an experimental drug that works as a D-amino acid oxidase (DAAO) inhibitor and is supposed to increase NMDA receptor functionality. It is developed to treat Friedrich ataxia and negative symptoms of schizophrenia. As of September 2024, it is in phase 2 clinical trials for schizophrenia, no recent development has been reported for ataxia, and the drug has been discontinued for Friedreich's ataxia.

== See also ==
- List of investigational antipsychotics
