= Zagociguat =

Clinical data
- Other names: CY-6463; CY6463; IW-6463; IW6463
- Routes of administration: Oral
- Drug class: Soluble guanylate cyclase (sGC) stimulator

Pharmacokinetic data
- Elimination half-life: 52.8–67.1 hours

Identifiers
- IUPAC name: 8-[(2-fluorophenyl)methyl]-6-[5-(trifluoromethyl)-1H-1,2,4-triazol-3-yl]imidazo[1,2-a]pyrazine
- CAS Number: 2201048-82-8
- PubChem CID: 134304734
- DrugBank: DB18315
- ChemSpider: 115008007
- UNII: H7KEN3O8AI
- KEGG: D12516
- ChEMBL: ChEMBL5314620

Chemical and physical data
- Formula: C_{16}H_{10}F_{4}N_{6}
- Molar mass: 362.292 g·mol^{−1}
- 3D model (JSmol): Interactive image
- SMILES: C1=CC=C(C(=C1)CC2=NC(=CN3C2=NC=C3)C4=NNC(=N4)C(F)(F)F)F
- InChI: InChI=1S/C16H10F4N6/c17-10-4-2-1-3-9(10)7-11-14-21-5-6-26(14)8-12(22-11)13-23-15(25-24-13)16(18,19)20/h1-6,8H,7H2,(H,23,24,25); Key:GTKNNCQKFKGSHR-UHFFFAOYSA-N

Zagociguat (INN, USAN; developmental code names CY-6463 and IW-6463) is a brain-penetrant soluble guanylate cyclase (sGC) stimulator which is under development for the treatment of Alzheimer's disease, MELAS syndrome, mitochondrial disorders, dementia, and schizophrenia. It is taken orally. The drug shows pro-cognitive-like and neuroprotective effects in preclinical research. Zagociguat was originated by Ironwood Pharmaceuticals and is under development by Cyclerion Therapeutics and/or Tisento Therapeutics. As of January 2026, it is in phase 2 clinical trials for Alzheimer's disease, MELAS syndrome, and mitochondrial disorders, whereas no recent development has been reported for dementia or schizophrenia.

== See also ==
- Soluble guanylate cyclase stimulator
- List of investigational antipsychotics
