= Tazbentetol =

Clinical data
- Other names: SPG302; SPG-302; Phenylbenzothiazole-PEG4-OH
- Routes of administration: Oral
- Drug class: Synaptogenesis enhancer; Neuroprotective agent; Neurorestorative agent

Pharmacokinetic data
- Elimination half-life: 1–2 hours

Identifiers
- IUPAC name: 2-[2-[2-[2-[4-(1,3-benzothiazol-2-yl)phenoxy]ethoxy]ethoxy]ethoxy]ethanol
- CAS Number: 2274723-90-7
- PubChem CID: 137464756
- IUPHAR/BPS: 13262
- DrugBank: DB18103
- ChemSpider: 128915415
- UNII: CMJ4GT6MRD
- ChEBI: CHEBI:759657
- ChEMBL: ChEMBL5314966

Chemical and physical data
- Formula: C_{21}H_{25}NO_{5}S
- Molar mass: 403.49 g·mol^{−1}
- 3D model (JSmol): Interactive image
- SMILES: C1=CC=C2C(=C1)N=C(S2)C3=CC=C(C=C3)OCCOCCOCCOCCO
- InChI: InChI=1S/C21H25NO5S/c23-9-10-24-11-12-25-13-14-26-15-16-27-18-7-5-17(6-8-18)21-22-19-3-1-2-4-20(19)28-21/h1-8,23H,9-16H2; Key:XSAIPEACQNRHOL-UHFFFAOYSA-N

Tazbentetol (INN; developmental code name SPG302) is a synaptogenic drug which is under development for the treatment of Alzheimer's disease, amyotrophic lateral sclerosis (ALS), schizophrenia, diabetic retinopathy, and glaucoma. It is taken orally.

== Pharmacology ==
The drug targets an undisclosed regulator of the F-actin-based cytoskeleton to increase synaptogenesis. It shows neuroprotective, neurorestorative, and pro-cognitive effects in preclinical research. The pharmacokinetics of tazbentetol have been studied. It has an elimination half-life of 1 to 2 hours in humans.

== Development ==
Tazbentetol is under development by Spinogenix. As of July 2026, it is in phase 2 clinical trials for Alzheimer's disease, ALS, and schizophrenia and is in the preclinical research stage of development for diabetic retinopathy and glaucoma. The drug received Food and Drug Administration (FDA) fast-track designation for ALS in the United States in May 2026. An FDA expanded-access program of tazbentetol for ALS was also approved in May 2025. Positive phase 2 results for schizphrenia were disclosed in March 2026.
