= Neboglamine =

Chemical compound

Clinical data
- Other names: Nebostinel; N-(4,4-Dimethylcyclohexyl)-L-α-glutamine
- ATC code: None

Identifiers
- IUPAC name: (4S)-4-Amino-5-[(4,4-dimethylcyclohexyl)amino]-5-oxopentanoic acid
- CAS Number: 163000-63-3
- PubChem CID: 3074827
- ChemSpider: 2333649
- UNII: 12EA34U5B8
- CompTox Dashboard (EPA): DTXSID2045787
- ECHA InfoCard: 100.162.081

Chemical and physical data
- Formula: C_{13}H_{24}N_{2}O_{3}
- Molar mass: 256.346 g·mol^{−1}
- 3D model (JSmol): Interactive image
- SMILES: CC1(CCC(CC1)NC(=O)C(CCC(=O)O)N)C
- InChI: InChI=1S/C13H24N2O3/c1-13(2)7-5-9(6-8-13)15-12(18)10(14)3-4-11(16)17/h9-10H,3-8,14H2,1-2H3,(H,15,18)(H,16,17)/t10-/m0/s1; Key:VCRGLZYPNNAVRP-JTQLQIEISA-N

Neboglamine (INN) (developmental code names CR-2249, XY-2401), formerly known as nebostinel, is a positive allosteric modulator of the glycine site of the NMDA receptor which is under investigation for Rottapharm for the treatment of schizophrenia and cocaine dependence. It shows cognition- and memory-enhancing effects in animal models. As of June 2015, it is in phase II clinical trials for both schizophrenia and cocaine abuse.

== See also ==
- List of investigational antipsychotics
