= Raul Gainetdinov =

Pharmacologist and neuroscientist

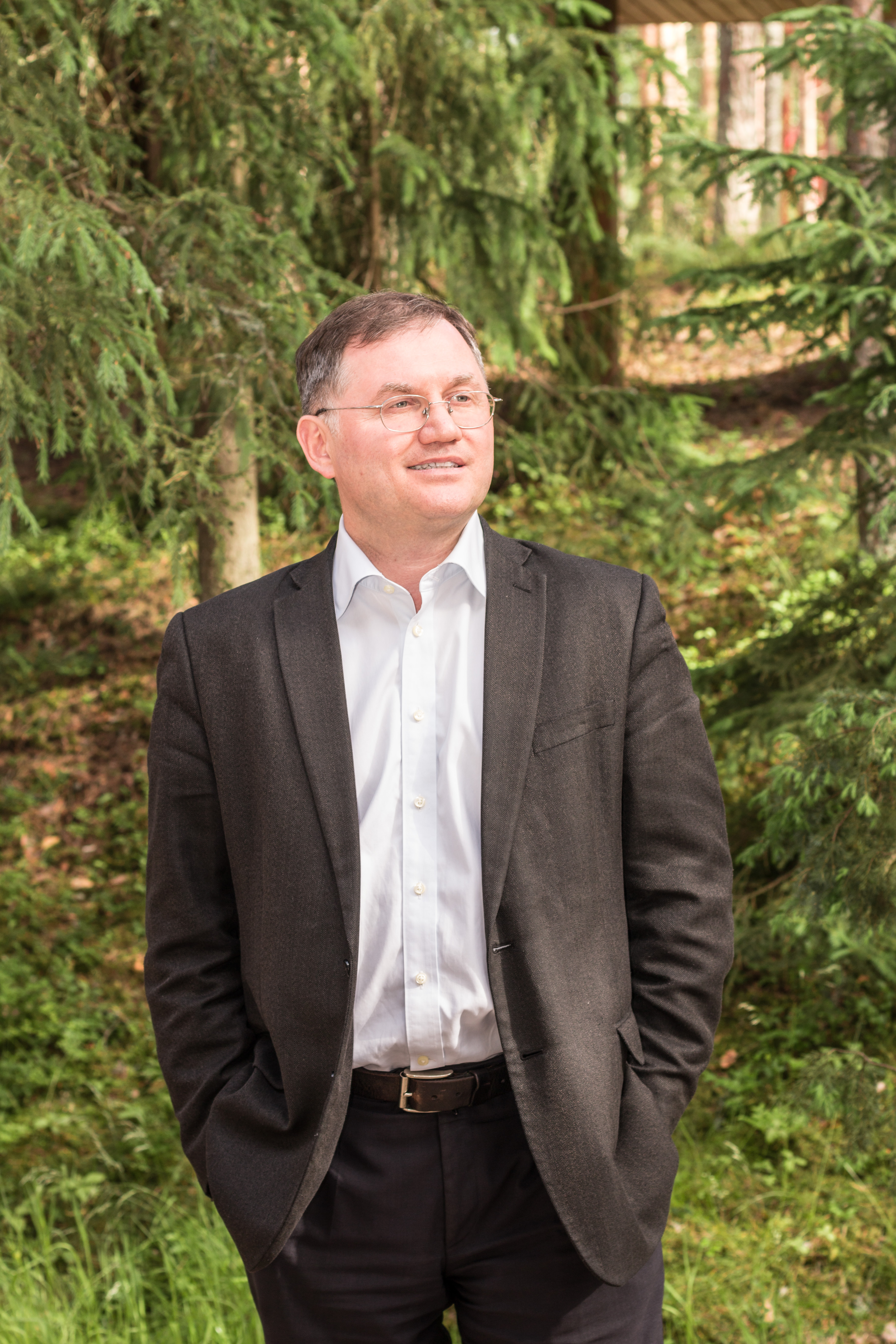
- Born: Raul R. Gainetdinov; September 1, 1964 (age 61)
- Known for: TAAR; Dopamine receptors
- Scientific career
- Fields: Neuropsychopharmacology; Medicine; Biology
- Institutions: Duke University; Italian Institute of Technology; Saint Petersburg University
- Academic advisors: Kirill Rayevsky; Marc G. Caron; Robert Lefkowitz

Raul Gainetdinov (born September 1, 1964) is a pharmacologist and neuroscientist. The main direction of his research is psychiatric and neurological diseases of the brain, such as schizophrenia, ADHD, depression and Parkinson's disease. He is the author of fundamental scientific works in pharmacology of dopamine, β-Arrestins and NMDA receptors. He is a pioneer researcher of Trace amine-associated receptors.

== Education ==
He earned an MD degree from the Second Moscow Medical Institute (now the Russian National Research Medical University) in 1988, followed by a PhD degree in Pharmacology in 1992 from the Russian Academy of Medical Sciences.

== Career ==
- 1996-2008 Postdoctoral Researcher - Associate Research Professor, Department of Cell Biology, Duke University, North Carolina, USA.
- 2008-2016 Senior Researcher, Department of Neuroscience and Brain Technologies, Italian Institute of Technology, Genova, Italy.
- 2013-2018 Professor, Skolkovo Institute of Science and Technology
- Since 2015 Director of Institute of Translational Biomedicine and Head of Laboratory of Neuroscience and Molecular Pharmacology, Saint Petersburg State University.

== Influence ==
Since 2013 he has been the chairman of the nomenclature committee for dopamine receptors of International Union of Basic and Clinical Pharmacology (IUPHAR).
