= Restorative neurology =

Transcranial direct-current stimulation
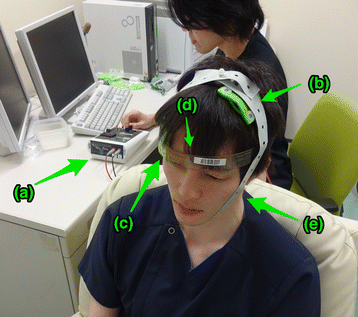
- tDCS administration. Anodal (b) and cathodal (c) electrodes with 35-cm^{2} size are put on F3 and right supraorbital region, respectively. A head strap is used (d) for convenience and reproducibility, and a rubber band (e) for reducing resistance.
- MeSH: D065908

Restorative neurology is a branch of neurology dedicated to improving functions of the impaired nervous system through selective structural or functional modification of abnormal neurocontrol according to underlying mechanisms and clinically unrecognized residual functions. When impaired, the body naturally reconstructs new neurological pathways and redirects activity. The field of restorative neurology works to accentuate these new pathways and primarily focuses on the theory of the plasticity of an impaired nervous system. Its main goal is to take a broken down and disordered nervous system and return it to a state of normal function. Certain treatment strategies are used to augment instead of fully replace any performance of surviving and also improving the potential of motor neuron functions. This rehabilitation of motor neurons allows patients a therapeutic approach to recovery opposed to physical structural reconstruction. It is applied in a wide range of disorders of the nervous system, including upper motor neuron dysfunctions like spinal cord injury, cerebral palsy, multiple sclerosis and acquired brain injury including stroke, and neuromuscular diseases as well as for control of pain and spasticity. Instead of applying a reconstructive neurobiological approach, i.e. structural modifications, restorative neurology relies on improving residual function. While subspecialties like neurosurgery and pharmacology exist and are useful in diagnosing and treating conditions of the nervous system, restorative neurology takes a pathophysiological approach. Instead of heavily relying on neurochemistry or perhaps an anatomical discipline, restorative neurology encompasses many fields and blends them together.

== History ==
William James is credited for the idea of neuroplasticity based on the ideas in his two-volume book, The Principles of Psychology, in 1890. Although it was not referred to neuroplasticity at the time, his concepts were clear. He was the first to recognize the brain as malleable, however his ideas were not widely accepted until the 1970s. Scientists had previously thought that a human adult brain was fixed, meaning that it was unable to generate new cells, and was essentially unchangeable. Children were the only group of individuals thought to have the ability to expand their knowledge and readily absorb new information. Several discoveries were made throughout the study of neuroplasticity. Eugenio Tanzi was responsible for the discovery of the neural articulations, known as synapses, and Ernesto Lugaro was later responsible for the association of neural plasticity with synaptic plasticity. It wasn’t until tests on rhesus monkeys, beginning in the 1920s, proved evidence of the brain activity described by William James. Karl Lashley worked with adult rhesus monkeys and found neurons to travel in different pathways in response to the same stimuli. This led him to believe that neural plasticity was possible, and the brain of an adult rhesus monkey was able to incorporate change and the ability to remodel itself. Despite these discoveries, the idea was largely unaccepted. Another study on rhesus monkeys in 1970, led by Michael Merzenich, researched sensory motor neurons in response to severed nerve endings in the hands of Rhesus monkeys. They discovered that the brain was able to rewire itself so that the monkeys could process signals from other parts of the hand where they could still feel. “Plasticity” was made popular by Livingstons work in 1966. He challenged the consensus that the brain only develops during a critical period in early childhood. He showed how many places of the brain continue to display plasticity through adulthood.

== Transcranial direct-current stimulation ==
Transcranial direct-current stimulation, tDCS, is a form of neurostimulation or neuromodulation. tDCS targets specific areas of the brain by using extremely low levels of constant electrical current. The use of electrical currents to modify brain function is a dated technique that dates back to more than 200 years ago. Various scientific studies have shown that tDCS has the ability to improve memory, coordination, and problem solving. Researchers have also documented that tDCS has the potential to treat other various disorders such as depression, anxiety, and PTSD.Another parameter to take into account is the orientation of the electric field on the patient. The cathode is the negatively charged electrode while the anode is the positively charged electrode. When the electricity is turned on, the current flows from the cathode to the anode, exciting the brain. tDCS is based on the duration and strength of the current. It has been shown that larger current densities results in larger and longer after effects of tDCS.

== Use ==
Restorative neurology is a new way and a combination of neural components that are able to determine how long a natural functional recovery can take place and to what extent clinical interventions can help such recovery. Although detecting any anatomy of the injured nervous system can be considered really difficult, this approach has made it possible to be able to track changes or improvements occurring in the neural injury. Restorative neurology’s main goal is to take advantage of the new anatomy and physiology approach for enhanced neurological recovery. A study has been done on a 37-year-old male who had unilateral spastic cerebral palsy (USCP). USCP, being the common subtype results with movement impairments on one side of the body. There are a few therapies for this type of rehabilitation. The study participant was diagnosed with USCP at 18 months due to a car accident. Along with robotic therapy, they also used tDCS. They applied them over the motor map of the affected hand. For each therapy session, the participant received 20 min of anodal tDCS. The excitatory sponge was placed over the location of motor map of the damaged hand. The anodal sponge was then place on the contralateral forehead. Both of these sponges were moistened with saline and held in place with a headband. By the end of the study it was confirmed that combined tDCS and robotic upper limb therapy safely improves upper limb function. - This study was adopted from their work with stroke rehab, that being said it is not known if the duration and dose of therapy is actually ideal for people with USCP. For this study in particular, it is stated that the participant confirmed that he reached the max accuracy with the robots by the midpoint of the study. However, it is not known if the effects of therapy would have been persistent had the training been shorter. That being said more work and research has yet to be done to identify “stop signals”, which indicate that participant has reached their improvement goal. There is another study in which Another study in which eight adults with chronic incomplete cervical spinal cord injury (iCSCI) participated. Being diagnosed with iCSCI meant minimal finger motor function. tDCS current was transferred by two saline soaked surface sponge electrodes. In order to stimulate the primary motor cortex, the anode electrode was place over C3 and C4. The cathode electrode was then placed over the contralateral supraorbital area. Results proved that the combination therapy protocol of 20 minutes of 2mA anodal tDCS over M1 with 60 minutes of high intensity training along with robotic exoskeleton is known to be safe in treatment of impaired arm and hand functions due to chronic incomplete spinal cord injury. This study’s report proved a promise in improving arm and hand function due to the therapy.
