= List of investigational antipsychotics =

Investigational antipsychotics

This is a list of investigational antipsychotics, or drugs that are currently under development for clinical use as antipsychotics for the treatment of schizophrenia and other psychotic disorders but are not yet approved. Psychotic disorders include schizophrenia, schizoaffective disorder, and others such as psychotic depression, Parkinson's disease psychosis, and Alzheimer's disease psychosis.

Chemical/generic names are listed first, with developmental code names, synonyms, and brand names in parentheses. The format of list items is "Name (Synonyms) – Mechanism of Action – Indication [Reference]".

This list was last comprehensively updated in June 2026. It is likely to become outdated with time.

== Under development ==
=== Preregistration ===
- Olanzapine long acting injectable (mdc-TJK; TEV-749; TV-44749) – dopamine D_{1} receptor antagonist, dopamine D_{2} receptor antagonist, serotonin 5-HT_{2A} receptor antagonist, and other actions – schizophrenia
- Roluperidone (CYR-101; MIN-101; MT-210) – serotonin 5-HT_{2A} receptor antagonist, sigma σ_{2} receptor antagonist, and other actions – schizophrenia

=== Phase 3 ===
- Brilaroxazine (RP-5000; RP-5063; oxaripiprazole) – dopamine D_{2} receptor partial agonist, serotonin 5-HT_{2A} receptor antagonist, and other actions – schizophrenia
- Direclidine (HTL-0016878; NBI-1117568; NBI-568) – muscarinic acetylcholine M_{4} receptor agonist – schizophrenia
- Evenamide (EA-8001; NW-3509; NW-3509A) – voltage-gated sodium channel (VGSC) blocker – schizophrenia
- Iclepertin (BI-425809) – glycine transporter 1 (GlyT1) inhibitor – schizophrenia
- N-Methylamisulpride (LB-102) – dopamine D_{2} and D_{3} receptor antagonist, serotonin 5-HT_{2B} receptor antagonist, and serotonin 5-HT_{7} receptor antagonist – schizophrenia
- Remlifanserin (ACP-204) – serotonin 5-HT_{2A} receptor inverse agonist – psychotic disorders
- Risperidone extended release (LYN-005) – dopamine D_{2} receptor antagonist and serotonin 5-HT_{2A} receptor antagonist – schizophrenia, schizoaffective disorder
- Ulotaront (SEP-363856; SEP-856) – trace amine-associated receptor 1 (TAAR1) agonist and serotonin 5-HT_{1A} receptor agonist – schizophrenia
- Valbenazine (Dysval; Ingrezza; MT-5199; NBI-98854; Remleas) – vesicular monoamine transporter 2 (VMAT2) blocker and monoamine depleting agent – schizophrenia
- Xanomeline enteric coated (BMS-986519; KarX-EC; LY-246708; Memcor; NNC-110232) – muscarinic acetylcholine M_{1} and M_{4} receptor agonist – psychotic disorders
- Xanomeline/trospium chloride (BMS-986510; Cobenfy; KarXT; trospium/LY-246708; trospium/xanomeline) – combination of xanomeline (muscarinic acetylcholine M_{1} and M_{4} receptor agonist) and trospium chloride (peripherally selective non-selective muscarinic acetylcholine receptor antagonist) – psychotic disorders

=== Phase 2/3 ===
- AVN-211 (CD-008-0173) – serotonin 5-HT_{6} receptor antagonist – schizophrenia
- Deudextromethorphan (AVP-786; CTP-786; d-DM; d6-DM; deudextromethorphan/quinidine; deuterated dextromethorphan; deuterated-DM) – combination of deudextromethorphan (sigma receptor agonist, ionotropic glutamate NMDA receptor antagonist, serotonin reuptake inhibitor, other actions) and quinidine (CYP2D6 inhibitor) – schizophrenia
- Sodium benzoate (benzoate; Clozaben; NaBen; SND-51; SND-11; SND-12; SND-13; SND-14; Tannquilynne; Ω-NaBen) – D-amino acid oxidase inhibitor – schizophrenia

=== Phase 2 ===
- Alofropodect (CPL-500036; CPL'36; CPL-500-036-02; CPL500036; CZ20; PG203; SUB193569) – phosphodiesterase PDE10A inhibitor – schizophrenia
- ANAVEX 3-71 (ANAVEX3-71; AF710B; AF-710B) – muscarinic acetylcholine M_{1} receptor positive allosteric modulator and sigma σ_{1} receptor agonist – schizophrenia
- Balipodect (AXS-20; TAK-063) – phosphodiesterase PDE10A inhibitor – schizophrenia
- Brenipatide (LY-3537031) – glucagon-like peptide-1 (GLP-1) receptor agonist and gastric inhibitory polypeptide (GIP) receptor agonist – schizophrenia
- Brilaroxazine (RP-5000; RP-5063; oxaripiprazole) – dopamine D_{2} receptor partial agonist, serotonin 5-HT_{2A} receptor antagonist, and other actions – schizoaffective disorder
- Emraclidine (CVL-231; PF-06852231) – muscarinic acetylcholine M_{4} receptor positive allosteric modulator – schizophrenia
- FKF-02SC (FKF02SC; TGOF-02N) – dopamine D_{2} receptor antagonist and serotonin 5-HT_{2A} receptor antagonist – schizophrenia
- GXV-813 (EX-A8078) – muscarinic acetylcholine M_{4} receptor agonist – schizophrenia
- HS-10380 – undefined mechanism of action – schizophrenia
- Idazoxan extended release (TR-01-IR; TR-01-XR; TR-01-XRR; TR-01-XRS) – α_{2}-adrenergic receptor antagonist – schizophrenia
- Iloperidone (Fanapt; Fanaptum; Fiapta; HP-873; ILO-522; VYV-683; Zomaril) – dopamine D_{2} receptor antagonist, serotonin 5-HT_{2A} receptor antagonist, and other actions – psychotic disorders
- KYN-5356 (MT-5356) – kynurenine aminotransferase 2 (KAT-II) inhibitor – schizophrenia
- Lu AF11167 (Lu-AF-11167) – phosphodiesterase PDE10A inhibitor – schizophrenia
- Lumateperone deuterated (ITI-1284; ITI-1284 ODT-SL) – dopamine D_{2} receptor partial agonist, serotonin 5-HT_{2A} receptor antagonist, and other actions – psychotic disorders
- Luvadaxistat (NBI-1065844; TAK-831) – D-amino acid oxidase inhibitor – schizophrenia
- LY-03017 (LPM-526000133; LPM526000133) – serotonin 5-HT_{2A} and 5-HT_{2C} receptor antagonist – schizophrenia
- LY-03020 (LPM-787000048; LPM787000048) – trace amine-associated receptor 1 (TAAR1) agonist and serotonin 5-HT_{2C} receptor agonist – schizophrenia
- Masupirdine (M1; M1 of SUVN-502; SUVN502; SVN-502) – serotonin 5-HT_{6} receptor antagonist – schizophrenia
- ML-007/muscarinic antagonist (ML-007/PAC; ML-007C-MA) – combination of ML-007 (muscarinic acetylcholine M_{1} and M_{4} receptor agonist) and a muscarinic acetylcholine receptor antagonist – schizophrenia, psychotic disorders
- Neboglamine (nebostinel; CR-2249; XY-2401) – ionotropic glutamate NMDA receptor glycine site positive allosteric modulator – schizophrenia
- NS-136 – muscarinic acetylcholine M_{4} receptor positive allosteric modulator – schizophrenia
- Osoresnontrine (BI-409306; SUB-166499) – phosphodiesterase PDE9A inhibitor – schizophrenia, psychotic disorders
- Pomaglumetad methionil (DB103; DB-103; LY-2140023; LY2140023; LY-2812223; LY-404039 prodrug) – metabotropic glutamate mGlu_{2} and mGlu_{3} receptor agonist (pomaglumetad prodrug) – schizophrenia
- Pyridoxamine (BST-4001; K-163; K163SZ; Pyridorin) – vitamin B_{6} and antioxidant – schizophrenia
- Sodium benzoate (benzoate; Clozaben; NaBen; SND-51; SND-11; SND-12; SND-13; SND-14; Tannquilynne; Ω-NaBen) – D-amino acid oxidase inhibitor – psychotic disorders
- Tazbentetol (SPG302; SPG-302) – undefined mechanism of action (targets an undisclosed regulator of the F-actin-based cytoskeleton to increase synaptogenesis) – schizophrenia
- Vafidemstat (ORY-2001) – lysine-specific demethylase 1 (LSD-1) inhibitor and monoamine oxidase B (MAO-B) inhibitor – schizophrenia

=== Phase 1/2 ===
- Cariprazine depot – dopamine D_{2} receptor partial agonist, serotonin 5-HT_{2A} receptor antagonist, and other actions – schizophrenia
- Forvisirvat (SP-624) – sirtuin-6 (SIRT6) activator – schizophrenia
- PF-6412562 (PF6412562; PF-06412562; PF06412562) – dopamine D_{1} and D_{5} receptor partial agonist – schizophrenia
- SKL-15508 (SKL–A4R; SKL15508) – α_{7} nicotinic acetylcholine receptor agonist – schizophrenia

=== Phase 1 ===
- DSP-0038 – serotonin 5-HT_{1A} receptor agonist and serotonin 5-HT_{2A} receptor antagonist – psychotic disorders
- HTL-0048149 (HTL'149; HTL-0048149; HTL-A; NXE-0048149; NXE-149) – GPR52 agonist – schizophrenia
- LTX-001 – glutaminase inhibitor – schizophrenia
- MK-5720 – undefined mechanism of action – schizophrenia
- ML-007 – muscarinic acetylcholine M_{1} and M_{4} receptor agonist – psychotic disorders
- NMRA-861 – muscarinic acetylcholine M_{4} receptor positive allosteric modulator – schizophrenia
- NMRA-898 – muscarinic acetylcholine M_{4} receptor positive allosteric modulator – schizophrenia
- OV-4071 – K+Cl– cotransporter 2 (KCC2) direct activator – psychotic disorders
- SEP-380135 – undefined mechanism of action – schizophrenia
- Squalamine (ENT-01; Enterin-01; kenterin) – various actions – psychotic disorders
- VV-119 (VV119) – undefined mechanism of action (dopamine and serotonin receptor modulator) – schizophrenia
- Zelquistinel (AGN-241751; GATE-251) – ionotropic glutamate NMDA receptor positive allosteric modulator – schizophrenia

=== Clinical phase unknown ===
- Quetiapine oral suspension – dopamine D_{1} receptor antagonist, dopamine D_{2} receptor antagonist, serotonin 5-HT_{2A} receptor antagonist, and other actions – schizophrenia

=== Preclinical ===
- BrAD-R13 (R13; Braegen-01) – tropomyosin receptor kinase B (TrkB) agonist (tropoflavin (7,8-dihydroxyflavone; 7,8-DHF) prodrug) – schizophrenia
- DPX-101 – α_{5} subunit-containing GABA_{A} receptor positive allosteric modulator – schizophrenia
- EM-221 – phosphodiesterase PDE10A inhibitor – schizophrenia
- NMRA-861 – muscarinic acetylcholine M_{4} receptor positive allosteric modulator – psychotic disorders
- OV-4071 – K+Cl– cotransporter 2 (KCC2) direct activator – schizphrenia
- TPT-0901 – cannabinoid CB_{1} and CB_{2} receptor agonist – schizophrenia
- Xanomeline/trospium prodrug (TerXT) – prodrug of xanomeline (muscarinic acetylcholine M_{1} and M_{4} receptor agonist) and trospium chloride (peripherally selective non-selective muscarinic acetylcholine receptor antagonist) – schizophrenia

=== Phase unknown ===
- Quetiapine long acting injection (CP-103) – dopamine D_{1} receptor antagonist, dopamine D_{2} receptor antagonist, serotonin 5-HT_{2A} receptor antagonist, and other actions – psychotic disorders

== Not under development ==
=== No development reported ===
- ADE-616 – undefined mechanism of action – schizophrenia
- AGX-201 (histamine dihydrochloride) – non-selective histamine receptor agonist – schizophrenia
- AMG-579 – phosphodiesterase PDE10A inhibitor – schizophrenia, schizoaffective disorder
- AMG-581 – undefined mechanism of action – schizophrenia, schizoaffective disorder
- Aripiprazole controlled release (ZY-102) – dopamine D_{2} receptor partial agonist, serotonin 5-HT_{2A} receptor antagonist, and other actions – schizophrenia
- Aripiprazole oral soluble film – dopamine D_{2} receptor partial agonist, serotonin 5-HT_{2A} receptor antagonist, and other actions – schizophrenia
- Aripiprazole transdermal (AQS-1301) – dopamine D_{2} receptor partial agonist, serotonin 5-HT_{2A} receptor antagonist, and other actions – schizophrenia
- ASP-4345 (ASP4345) – dopamine D_{1} receptor positive allosteric modulator – schizophrenia
- BIMG-80 – dopamine D_{1} receptor antagonist, dopamine D_{2} receptor antagonist, serotonin 5-HT_{2A} receptor antagonist, and other actions – schizophrenia
- Brexpiprazole long-acting injectable (MTD-211) – dopamine D_{2} receptor partial agonist, serotonin 5-HT_{2A} receptor antagonist, and other actions – schizophrenia
- Buspirone controlled release (buspirone ER) – serotonin 5-HT_{1A} receptor agonist – schizophrenia
- Cannabidiol (CBD; Arvisol) – atypical cannabinoid and various actions – schizophrenia
- Cariprazine (CarMP-214; Reagila; RGH-188; Symvenu; Vraylar WID-RGC20) – dopamine D_{2} receptor partial agonist, serotonin 5-HT_{2A} receptor antagonist, and other actions – schizophrenia
- Clozapine modified-release – dopamine D_{1} receptor antagonist, dopamine D_{2} receptor antagonist, serotonin 5-HT_{2A} receptor antagonist, and other actions – schizophrenia
- CM-182 – undefined mechanism of action – schizophrenia
- CVL-047 – phosphodiesterase PDE4 inhibitor – schizophrenia
- CY-150112 – undefined mechanism of action – schizophrenia
- GSK-729327 (GSK729327) – ionotropic glutamate AMPA receptor positive allosteric modulator – schizophrenia
- GT-001 (GT001) – GABA_{A} receptor positive allosteric modulator – psychotic disorders
- HW-165 – dopamine D_{2} and D_{3} receptor partial agonist – schizophrenia
- JNJ-17305600 – glycine transporter 1 (GlyT1) inhibitor – schizophrenia
- JNJ-37822681 – dopamine D_{2} receptor antagonist – schizophrenia
- LM-007 – undefined mechanism of action – schizophrenia
- MCD-386 (CDD-0102; CDD-0102-J; MCD-386 Forte/Transderm; MCD-386CR) – muscarinic acetylcholine M_{1} receptor agonist – schizophrenia
- Mesdopetam (IRL-790) – atypical dopamine D_{2} and D_{3} receptor antagonist and other actions – psychotic disorders
- ML-007 – muscarinic acetylcholine M_{1} and M_{4} receptor agonist – schizophrenia
- Olanzapine – dopamine D_{1} receptor antagonist, dopamine D_{2} receptor antagonist, serotonin 5-HT_{2A} receptor antagonist, and other actions – psychotic disorders
- Olanzapine/samidorphan (ALKS-33/olanzapine; ALKS-3831; Lybalvi; olanzapine/ALKS 33; OLZ/SAM; Samidorphan/olanzapine) – combination of olanzapine (dopamine D_{1} receptor antagonist, dopamine D_{2} receptor antagonist, serotonin 5-HT_{2A} receptor antagonist, and other actions) and samidorphan (non-selective opioid receptor antagonist) – psychotic disorders
- Paliperidone controlled-release (DLP-115) – dopamine D_{2} receptor antagonist, serotonin 5-HT_{2A} receptor antagonist, and other actions – schizophrenia
- PF-06266047 (PF06266047; PF-6266047; PF6266047) – undefined mechanism of action – schizophrenia
- Plazinemdor (CAD-9303) – ionotropic glutamate NMDA receptor positive allosteric modulator – schizophrenia
- Prochlorperazine sublingual – dopamine D_{2} receptor antagonist, serotonin 5-HT_{2A} receptor antagonists, and other actions – psychotic disorders
- Research programme: AMPA receptor agonists - RespireRx (Ampakines; CX-929; CX1501; CX1763; CX1796; CX1837; CX1846; CX1942; CX2007; CX2076; CX516; CX614; CX707) – ionotropic glutamate AMPA receptor positive allosteric modulators – schizophrenia
- Research programme: CNS disorder therapeutics - Promentis Pharmaceuticals – antioxidants, glutamate receptor modulators, and SLC7A11 modulators – schizophrenia
- Research programme: CNS disorders therapeutics - Sage Therapeutics – GABA_{A} receptor modulators and ionotropic glutamate NMDA receptor modulators – schizophrenia, psychotic disorders
- Research programme: glutamate receptor modulators - Eli Lilly and Company (LY-503430; LY-2607540; LY-450108) – ionotropic glutamate AMPA receptor agonists, ionotropic glutamate kainate receptor antagonists, and metabotropic glutamate mGlu_{2} receptor modulators – schizophrenia
- Research programme: kynurenine aminotransferase II inhibitors - Pfizer – kynurenine aminotransferase 2 (KAT-II) inhibitors – schizophrenia
- Research programme: long-acting neuropsychiatric therapeutics - Teva (NP-201; NP-202; risperidone long-acting implant; ropinirole long-acting implant) – dopamine D_{2} receptor agonists, dopamine D_{2} receptor antagonists, and serotonin 5-HT_{2A} receptor antagonists – schizophrenia
- Research programme: neuropsychiatric therapeutics - GeNeuro – viral envelope protein inhibitors – psychotic disorders
- Research programme: neuropsychiatric disorder therapies - Neumora Therapeutics/Vanderbilt University – muscarinic M_{4} receptor modulators – schizophrenia
- Research programme: phosphodiesterase 10 inhibitors - Merck (SCH-1518291) – phosphodiesterase PDE10A inhibitor – schizophrenia
- Research programme: psychiatric disorder therapeutics - NeuroProfile – neuron modulators – schizophrenia
- Research programme: psychiatric disorder therapies - Chakra Biotech/Tikvah Therapeutics (CB-010002; CB-020001; CB-030004; CB-030006) – serotonin 5-HT_{2C} receptor antagonists, adrenergic receptor antagonists, dopamine D_{2} receptor antagonists, serotonin 5-HT_{2A} receptor modulators, and serotonin 5-HT_{6} receptor antagonists – schizophrenia
- Research programme: psychotic disorders therapeutics - GeNeuro (New anti-HERV-W Ab; New anti-HERV-W mab) – Env gene product inhibitors – psychotic disorders
- Research programme: schizophrenia therapeutics - Lundbeck/Vanderbilt University – dopamine release inhibitors – schizophrenia
- Research programme: small molecule therapeutics - Saniona/Boehringer Ingelheim – α_{4}β_{2} nicotinic acetylcholine receptor modulators – schizophrenia
- RO-5545965 (RO5545965; RG-7203) – phosphodiesterase PDE10A inhibitor – schizophrenia
- SDZ-PSD-958 – dopamine D_{1} receptor antagonist – psychotic disorders
- TAK-058 (ENV-8058) – serotonin 5-HT_{3} receptor antagonist – schizophrenia
- Talnetant (SB-223242; SB-223412; SB-223412A) – neurokinin NK_{3} receptor antagonist – schizophrenia
- Tetrahydrocannabinol/cannabidiol (THC/CBD; cannabidiol/tetrahydrocannabinol; CBD/THC; CanChew; MedChew) – combination of tetrahydrocannabinol (THC; cannabinoid CB_{1} and CB_{2} receptor agonist) and cannabidiol (CBD; atypical cannabinoid and various actions) – psychotic disorders
- TPN-672 – serotonin 5-HT_{1A} receptor agonist, dopamine D_{2} receptor antagonist, and serotonin 5-HT_{2A} receptor antagonist – schizophrenia
- TS-134 (TS-1341) – undefined mechanism of action – schizophrenia
- TV-48438 – undefined mechanism of action – schizophrenia
- Usmarapride (SUVN-D-4010) – serotonin 5-HT_{4} receptor agonist – schizophrenia
- VLT-015 (FAP-2015) – undefined mechanism of action – schizophrenia
- Zagociguat (CY-6463; IW-6463) – soluble guanylyl cyclase (sGC) agonist – schizophrenia
- Ziprasidone extended release – dopamine D_{2} receptor antagonist, serotonin 5-HT_{2A} receptor antagonist, and other actions – schizophrenia

=== Suspended ===
- Loxapine film (INT 0036/2012; INT 0036/2013; INT0036; Loxapine VersaFilm) – dopamine D_{1} receptor antagonist, dopamine D_{2} receptor antagonist, serotonin 5-HT_{2A} receptor antagonist, and other actions – schizophrenia
- OMS-824 (OMS-643762) – phosphodiesterase PDE10A inhibitor – schizophrenia
- Pimavanserin (ACP-103; BVF-048; Nuplazid) – serotonin 5-HT_{2A} receptor inverse agonist – schizophrenia

=== Discontinued ===
- A-69024 – dopamine D_{1} receptor antagonist – psychotic disorders
- ABT-925 (A-437203; BSF-201640; DTA-201; LU-201640) – dopamine D_{3} receptor antagonist – schizophrenia
- ACP-319 (VU0467319; VU-0467319; VU319; VU-319) – muscarinic acetylcholine M_{1} receptor positive allosteric modulator – schizophrenia
- Adipiplon (NG-273; NG2-73) – GABA_{A} receptor positive allosteric modulator – schizophrenia
- ADX-71149 (JNJ-1813; JNJ-40411813; JNJ-mGluR2-PAM) – metabotropic glutamate mGlu_{2} receptor positive allosteric modulator – schizophrenia
- Alosetron (GR-68755; GR-68755C; Lotronex) – serotonin 5-HT_{3} receptor antagonist – schizophrenia
- AM-831 (AM831; PCAP programme) – dopamine D_{2} receptor antagonist, serotonin 5-HT_{2A} receptor antagonist, and muscarinic acetylcholine M_{1} receptor agonist – schizophrenia
- Aplindore (DAB-452; Palindore; SLS-006; WAY-DAB 452) – dopamine D_{2} receptor agonist – schizophrenia
- Aprepitant (Emend; L-754030; MK-0869; MK-869; ONO-7436) – neurokinin NK_{1} receptor antagonist – schizophrenia
- Aripiprazole (Abilify; Abilify Asimtufii; Abilify Maintena; Abilify MyCite; Abilitat; Ao Pai; Arlemide; Asimtufii; OPC-14597; OPC-31) – dopamine D_{2} receptor partial agonist, serotonin 5-HT_{2A} receptor antagonist, and other actions – psychotic disorders
- Armodafinil (CEP-10953; Nuvigil; R-modafinil) – atypical dopamine reuptake inhibitor (DRI) – schizophrenia
- ASP-2535 (ASP2535) – undefined mechanism of action – schizophrenia
- ASP-2905 (ASP2905) – undefined mechanism of action – schizophrenia
- AUT-00201 – voltage-gated potassium channel K_{v}3.1, K_{v}3.2, and K_{v}3.4 positive allosteric modulator – schizophrenia
- AUT-00206 – voltage-gated potassium channel K_{v}3.1 and K_{v}3.2 positive allosteric modulator – schizophrenia
- AZD-0328 (AZD0328) – α_{7} nicotinic acetylcholine receptor agonist – schizophrenia
- Basmisanil (NTX-1511; RG-1662; RO-5186582) – α_{5} subunit-containing GABA_{A} receptor negative allosteric modulator – schizophrenia
- Batelapine (CGS-13429; CGS-13429A) – undefined mechanism of action (clozapine analogue) – psychotic disorders
- Berupipam (NNC 22-0010) – dopamine D_{1} receptor antagonist – psychotic disorders
- Bifeprunox (DU-127090) – dopamine D_{2} receptor partial agonist and serotonin 5-HT_{1A} receptor agonist – schizophrenia
- Bitopertin (DISC-1459; R-1678; RG-6718; RG-6178; RG1678; RO-4917838; RO4917838) – glycine transporter 1 (GlyT1) inhibitor – schizophrenia
- BL-1020 (AN-168; CYP-1020; perphenazine GABA ester; perphenazine-4-aminobutyrate) – prodrug of perphenazine (dopamine D_{2} receptor antagonist, other actions) and γ-aminobutyric acid (GABA) (GABA receptor agonist) – schizophrenia, schizoaffective disorder
- BMS-181100 (BMY-14802; MJ-14802) – serotonin 5-HT_{1A} receptor agonist, sigma receptor antagonist, and other actions – psychotic disorders
- Cannabidiol (CBD; Epidiolex; Epidyolex; GW-42003; GWP-42003; GWP-42003-P; JZP-926) – atypical cannabinoid and various actions – schizophrenia
- Cerlapirdine (PF-05212365; PF-5212365; SAM-531; WAY-262531) – serotonin 5-HT_{6} receptor antagonist – schizophrenia
- CX-516 (1-BCP; AMPAlex; BDP-12; SPD-420) – ionotropic glutamate AMPA receptor positive allosteric modulator – schizophrenia
- Davunetide intranasal (AL-108; NAP; NAPVSIPQ) – microtubule modulator – schizophrenia
- DB-105 (ORM-12741) – α_{2C}-adrenergic receptor antagonist – schizophrenia
- Deutarserine (C-21692; CTP-692; D-serine deuterated) – ionotropic glutamate NMDA receptor agonist – schizophrenia
- DHA-clozapine (Clozaprexin; docosahexaenoic acid-clozapine) – dopamine D_{1} receptor antagonist, dopamine D_{2} receptor antagonist, serotonin 5-HT_{2A} receptor antagonist, and other actions (clozapine prodrug with enhanced central penetration) – schizophrenia
- Drinabant (AVE-1625; INDV-5004; OPNT-004) – cannabinoid CB_{1} receptor antagonist – schizophrenia
- DSP-6745 – serotonin 5-HT_{2A} and 5-HT_{2C} receptor antagonist – psychotic disorders
- Ecopipam (EBS-101; PSYRX-101; SCH-39166) – dopamine D_{1} receptor antagonist – schizophrenia
- Eglumetad (eglumegad; LY-354740) – metabotropic glutamate mGlu_{2} and mGlu_{3} receptor agonist – schizophrenia, psychotic disorders
- Elinzanetant (BAY-3427080; GSK-1144814A; GSK-1144814; Lynkuet; NT-814) – neurokinin NK_{1} and NK_{3} receptor antagonist – schizophrenia
- Eltoprazine (DU-28853) – serotonin 5-HT_{1A} and 5-HT_{1B} receptor agonist – psychotic disorders
- Erteberel (LY-500307; SERBA-1) – estrogen receptor beta (ERβ) agonist – schizophrenia
- Ethyl eicosapentaenoic acid (AMR-101; eicosapentaenoic acid ethyl ester; ethyl eicosapentaenoate; ethyl icopenate; ethyl-EPA; icosapent ethyl-LAX-101; LAX-101c; Miraxion; Vascepa; Vazkepa) – omega-3 fatty acid – psychotic disorders
- F-17464 – dopamine D_{3} receptor antagonist and serotonin 5-HT_{1A} receptor agonist – schizophrenia
- Fananserin (RP-62203) – dopamine D_{4} receptor antagonist and serotonin 5-HT_{2} receptor antagonist – schizophrenia
- Farampator (CX-691; ORG-24448) – ionotropic glutamate AMPA receptor positive allosteric modulator – schizophrenia
- Fluperlapine (NB-106689) – dopamine D_{2} receptor antagonist, serotonin 5-HT_{2A} receptor antagonist, and other actions (clozapine analogue) – schizophrenia
- FRM-6308 (EVP-6308) – phosphodiesterase PDE10A inhibitor – schizophrenia
- GSK-239512 (GSK239512) – histamine H_{3} receptor antagonist – schizophrenia
- HP-370 – undefined mechanism of action – psychotic disorders
- Idazoxan (CGP-25811A; RX-781094) – α_{2}-adrenergic receptor antagonist – schizophrenia
- Ibipinabant (BMS-646256; SLV-319) – cannabinoid CB_{1} receptor antagonist – psychotic disorders
- Itasetron (DAU-6215; U-98079) – serotonin 5-HT_{3} receptor antagonist – psychotic disorders
- JNJ-39393406 – α_{7} nicotinic acetylcholine receptor positive allosteric modulator – schizophrenia
- Lamotrigine (BW-430C78; BW-430C; Labileno; Lamactil; Lamictal; Lamictin; Lamitrin) – voltage-gated sodium channel (VGSC) blocker – schizophrenia
- Lisdexamfetamine (Elvanse; LDX; NRP-104; S-877489; SHP-489; SPD-489; Tyvense; Venvanse; Vyvanse) – norepinephrine–dopamine releasing agent (NDRA) – schizophrenia
- LU-35138 – dopamine D_{4} receptor antagonist – schizophrenia
- Lu AA39959 (LUAA-399599) – undefined mechanism of action (ion channel modulator) – schizophrenia
- Lu AF35700 (d8-zicronapine) – dopamine D_{1} and D_{2} receptor antagonist, serotonin 5-HT_{2A} receptor antagonist, serotonin 5-HT_{6} receptor antagonist, and other actions – schizophrenia, schizoaffective disorder
- Mardepodect (MP-10; PF-02545920; PF02545920; PF-2545920; PF2545920) – phosphodiesterase PDE10A inhibitor – schizophrenia
- Meclinertant (reminertant; SR-48692) – neurotensin NTS_{1} receptor antagonist – schizophrenia
- Melperone (Bunil; Buronil; Melperon; Methylperon; Methylperone; Metylperon; Metylperone) – dopamine D_{2} receptor antagonist, serotonin 5-HT_{2A} receptor antagonist, and other actions – psychotic disorders
- Mifepristone (C-1073; Corlux; Corluxin; Korlym; Mifegyne; Mifeprex; RU-38486; RU-486) – glucocorticoid receptor antagonist, progesterone receptor antagonist, and other actions – psychotic affective disorders
- MIN-301 (NRG-101) – ERBB4 (HER4) receptor agonist – schizophrenia
- MK-0249 – histamine H_{3} receptor antagonist – schizophrenia
- MK-0777 (L-830982; TPA-023) – GABA_{A} receptor positive and negative allosteric modulator – schizophrenia
- MK-8189 – phosphodiesterase PDE10A inhibitor – schizophrenia
- Nerisopam (EGIS-6775; GYKI-52322) – undefined mechanism of action (atypical benzodiazepine analogue) – psychotic disorders
- NGD-931 – undefined mechanism of action – psychotic disorders
- NLX-101 (F-15599; F15599) – serotonin 5-HT_{1A} receptor agonist – schizophrenia
- NNC 01-0687 (ADX-10061; CEE-03-310; NNC-687) – dopamine D_{1} receptor antagonist – schizophrenia
- NS-626 – calcium channel blocker – psychotic disorders
- Ocaperidone (R-79598) – dopamine D_{2} receptor antagonist, serotonin 5-HT_{2A} receptor antagonist, and other actions – schizophrenia, psychotic disorders
- Odapipam (NNC 01-0756, NNC-756, NO-756) – dopamine D_{1} receptor antagonist – psychotic disorders
- ORM-10921 – α_{2C}-adrenergic receptor antagonist – schizophrenia
- Oxytocin intranasal – oxytocin receptor agonist – schizophrenia
- Panamesine (EMD-57445) – sigma σ_{1} and σ_{2} receptor antagonist
- Pavinetant (AZ-12472520; AZD-2624; AZD-4901; MLE-4901) – neurokinin NK_{3} receptor antagonist – schizophrenia
- PF-3463275 (PF3463275; PF-03463275; PF03463275) – glycine transporter 1 (GlyT1) inhibitor – schizophrenia
- PF-5180999 (PF5180999; PF-05180999; PF05180999) – phosphodiesterase PDE2 inhibitor – schizophrenia
- Pozanicline (A-87089.0; ABT-089) – α_{4}β_{2} nicotinic acetylcholine receptor agonist, nicotinic acetylcholine receptor agonist – schizophrenia
- Pramipexole (BI-Sifrol; Daquiran; Mirapex; Mirapex ER; Mirapex LA; Mirapexin; Pexola; Sifrol; Sirfrol ER; SND-919; SND-919Y) – dopamine D_{2}, D_{3}, and D_{4} receptor agonist – schizophrenia
- Preclamol (3-PPP) – dopamine D_{2} receptor partial agonist – schizophrenia, psychotic disorders
- Pridopidine (ACR-16; ASP-2314; FNP-253; FNP-254; FR-310826; Huntexil; Nurzigma; TV-7820) – sigma σ_{1} receptor agonist – schizophrenia
- Quetiapine (FK-949; FK949E; ICI-204636; Seroquel; Seroquel XL; Seroquel XR) – dopamine D_{1} receptor antagonist, dopamine D_{2} receptor antagonist, serotonin 5-HT_{2A} receptor antagonist, and other actions – psychotic disorders
- Ralmitaront (NTX-2001; RG-7906; RO-6889450) – trace amine-associated receptor 1 (TAAR1) agonist – schizophrenia, schizoaffective disorder
- Research programme: CEB 1310 series - Vernalis – undefined mechanism of action – psychotic disorders
- Research programme: dopamine D4 receptor antagonists - Sanofi-Aventis/NPS Allelix – dopamine D_{4} receptor antagonists – schizophrenia
- Research programme: metabotropic glutamate receptor 5 modulators - Addex Therapeutics (ADX-47273; ADX-50938; ADX-63365; ADX63365 CDPPB) – metabotropic glutamate mGlu_{5} receptor positive allosteric modulators – schizophrenia
- Research programme: mGluR2 modulators - Addex Pharmaceuticals/Ortho-McNeil (ADX-92639; JNJ-40068782) – metabotropic glutamate mGlu_{2} receptor modulators – schizophrenia
- Research programme: NMDA receptor modulators - AbbVie (NRX-1050; NRX-1051; NRX-1059; NRX-105x; NRX-1060; NRX-2085; NRX-20xx) – ionotropic glutamate NMDA receptor modulators – schizophrenia
- Research programme: schizophrenia therapeutics - Myrobalan Therapeutics – synaptic transmission modulators – schizophrenia
- RG-7410 (RG7410) – trace amine-associated receptor 1 (TAAR1) agonist – schizophrenia
- Riluzole (PK-26124; Rilutek; RP-54274) – various actions – psychotic disorders
- Rimonabant (Acomplia; SR-141716; SR-141716A; Zimulti) – cannabinoid CB_{1} receptor antagonist – schizophrenia
- Risperidone (Risperidone LAI) – dopamine D_{2} receptor antagonist, serotonin 5-HT_{2A} receptor antagonist, and other actions – schizophrenia
- Risperidone controlled-release implant (BB0817; EN-3342) – dopamine D_{2} receptor antagonist, serotonin 5-HT_{2A} receptor antagonist, and other actions – schizophrenia
- Risperidone extended release (Risperisphere) – dopamine D_{2} receptor antagonist, serotonin 5-HT_{2A} receptor antagonist, and other actions – schizophrenia
- Roflumilast (APTA-2217; B-9302-107; BY-217; BYK-20869; Daliresp; Daxas; IN-ALR-01; Libertek) – phosphodiesterase PDE4 inhibitor – schizophrenia
- S-14506 – serotonin 5-HT_{1A} receptor agonist – psychotic disorders
- Sabcomeline (BCI-224; CEB 242; Memric; SB-202026) – muscarinic acetylcholine M_{1} receptor agonist – schizophrenia
- Savoxepin (CGP-19486; CGP-19486A; cipazoxapine; savoxepine) – dopamine D_{2} receptor antagonist – psychotic disorders
- SDZ 208-912 (SDZ-208912; HDC-912; MAR-327; SDZ-HDC-912; SDZ-MAR-327) – dopamine D_{2} receptor partial agonist and other actions – psychotic disorders
- Secretin (INN-329; RG-1068; SecreFlo) – imaging enhancer – schizophrenia (diagnosis)
- SLV-354 (ABT-354) – serotonin 5-HT_{6} receptor antagonist – schizophrenia
- Sonepiprazole (U-101387; PNU-101387) – dopamine D_{4} receptor antagonist – schizophrenia
- Squalamine (ENT-01; Enterin-01; kenterin) – various actions – schizophrenia
- SR-31742A (SR-31742) – sigma receptor modulator – schizophrenia
- SSR-241586 (SSR241586) – neurokinin NK_{2} and NK_{3} receptor antagonist – schizophrenia
- SSR-504734 (SSR504734) – glycine transporter 1 (GlyT1) inhibitor – schizophrenia
- Surinabant (SR-147778; SR147778) – cannabinoid CB_{1} receptor antagonist – psychotic disorders
- Suvecaltamide (CX-8998; JZP-385; MK-8998) – T-type calcium channel blocker – schizophrenia
- TAK-915 (TAK915) – phosphodiesterase PDE2 inhibitor – schizophrenia
- Talipexole (BHT-920; Domin) – dopamine D_{2} receptor agonist and α_{2}-adrenergic receptor agonist – psychotic disorders
- Terguride (Dironyl; Mysalfon; SH-406; Teluron; transdihydrolisuride; VUFB-6638; ZK-31224) – dopamine D_{2} receptor partial agonist, serotonin 5-HT_{2A} receptor partial agonist, and other actions – schizophrenia
- Tiospirone (BMY-13859) – dopamine D_{2} receptor antagonist, serotonin 5-HT_{2A} receptor antagonist, and other actions – psychotic disorders
- TS-032 (PF-4802540; PF4802540; PF-04802540; PF04802540) – metabotropic glutamate mGlu_{2} receptor agonist – schizophrenia
- UH-232 ((+)-UH-232) – dopamine D_{2} and D_{3} autoreceptor antagonist, other actions – schizophrenia
- Ulotaront (SEP-363856; SEP-856) – trace amine-associated receptor 1 (TAAR1) agonist and serotonin 5-HT_{1A} receptor agonist – schizophrenia
- Umespirone (KC-7218; KC-9172) – dopamine D_{2} receptor partial agonist, serotonin 5-HT_{1A} receptor agonist, and α_{1}-adrenergic receptor antagonist – psychotic disorders
- Vabicaserin (PF-05208769; PF-5208769; SCA-136) – serotonin 5-HT_{2C} receptor agonist – schizophrenia
- Volinanserin (M-100907; MDL-100907) – serotonin 5-HT_{2A} receptor antagonist – schizophrenia
- Y-20024 – dopamine D_{2} receptor antagonist – psychotic disorders
- YKP-1447 (YKP-1358) – dopamine D_{2} receptor antagonist, serotonin 5-HT_{2A} receptor antagonist, and other actions – schizophrenia
- ZD-3638 – dopamine D_{1} receptor antagonist, dopamine D_{2} receptor antagonist, and serotonin 5-HT_{2} receptor antagonist – schizophrenia, psychotic disorders
- Zelatriazin (TAK-041; NBI-1065846; NBI-846) – GPR139 agonist – schizophrenia

== Clinically used drugs ==
=== Approved drugs ===
==== First-generation antipsychotics ====
- Chlorpromazine (Thorazine, Largactil) – dopamine D_{2} receptor antagonist, serotonin 5-HT_{2A} receptor antagonist, and other actions – schizophrenia
- Haloperidol (Haldol) – dopamine D_{2} and D_{3} receptor antagonist, sigma σ_{1} receptor antagonist, and other actions – schizophrenia
- Many others...

==== Second-generation antipsychotics ====
- Asenapine (Atisenap; ME2136; ORG-5222; Saphris; SCH-900274; Sycrest) – dopamine D_{1} receptor antagonist, dopamine D_{2} receptor antagonist, serotonin 5-HT_{2A} receptor antagonist, and other actions – schizophrenia
- Asenapine transdermal (HP-3070; Secuado) – dopamine D_{1} receptor antagonist, dopamine D_{2} receptor antagonist, serotonin 5-HT_{2A} receptor antagonist, and other actions – schizophrenia
- Blonanserin (AD-5423; DSP-5423; DSP-5423P; Lonasen) – dopamine D_{2} receptor antagonist, serotonin 5-HT_{2A} receptor antagonist, and other actions – schizophrenia
- Clozapine (Clozaril) – dopamine D_{1} receptor antagonist, dopamine D_{2} receptor antagonist, serotonin 5-HT_{2A} receptor antagonist, and other actions – schizophrenia
- Clozapine (clozapine ODT; clozapine once-daily; Clozapine QD; FazaClo HD; FazaClo LD; FazaClo ODT; Versacloz) – dopamine D_{1} receptor antagonist, dopamine D_{2} receptor antagonist, serotonin 5-HT_{2A} receptor antagonist, and other actions – schizophrenia
- Iloperidone (Fanapt; Fanaptum; Fiapta; HP-873; ILO-522; VYV-683; Zomaril) – dopamine D_{2} receptor antagonist, serotonin 5-HT_{2A} receptor antagonist, and other actions – schizophrenia
- Lurasidone (DSP-1349M; Latuda; SM-13496; SMP-13496) – dopamine D_{2} receptor antagonist, serotonin 5-HT_{2A} receptor antagonist, and other actions – schizophrenia
- Melperone (Buronil) – dopamine D_{2} receptor antagonist, serotonin 5-HT_{2A} receptor antagonist, and other actions – schizophrenia
- Milsaperidone (Bysanti; P-88; VHX-869; VHX-896) – dopamine D_{2} receptor antagonist, serotonin 5-HT_{2A} receptor antagonist, and other actions – schizophrenia
- Olanzapine (BR-5402; LY-170053; LY-170052; Midax; Zypadhera; Zyprexa; Zyprexa Relprevv; Zyprexa Velotab; Zyprexa Zydis) – dopamine D_{1} receptor antagonist, dopamine D_{2} receptor antagonist, serotonin 5-HT_{2A} receptor antagonist, and other actions – schizophrenia
- Paliperidone (9-hydroxyrisperidone; Invega; JNS-007ER; R0-76477; RO-76477) – dopamine D_{2} receptor antagonist and serotonin 5-HT_{2} receptor antagonist – schizophrenia, schizoaffective disorder
- Paliperidone palmitate (Byannli; Invega Hafyera; Invega Sustenna; Invega Trinza; paliperidone palmitate 1–6-month; R0-92670; RO-92670; Sustenna; Trevicta; Xeplion) – dopamine D_{2} receptor antagonist and serotonin 5-HT_{2} receptor antagonist – schizophrenia, schizoaffective disorder
- Paliperidone palmitate extended-release (Erzofri; LY-03010; Meibirui; Ruibailai) – dopamine D_{2} receptor antagonist and serotonin 5-HT_{2} receptor antagonist – schizophrenia, schizoaffective disorder
- Perospirone (Lullan; SM-9018) – dopamine D_{2} receptor antagonist, serotonin 5-HT_{2A} receptor antagonist, and other actions – schizophrenia
- Quetiapine (FK-949; FK949E; ICI-204636; Seroquel; Seroquel XL; Seroquel XR) – dopamine D_{1} receptor antagonist, dopamine D_{2} receptor antagonist, serotonin 5-HT_{2A} receptor antagonist, and other actions – schizophrenia
- Risperidone (JNJ-410397-AAA; R-64766; R064766; Risperdal; Risperdal Consta; Risperdal Depot) – dopamine D_{2} receptor antagonist, serotonin 5-HT_{2A} receptor antagonist, and other actions – schizophrenia
- Risperidone extended release (LY-03004; risperidone ER microspheres for injection; Rykindo) – dopamine D_{2} receptor antagonist, serotonin 5-HT_{2A} receptor antagonist, and other actions – schizophrenia
- Risperidone extended release (Doria; Okedi; Risperidona ISM; Risperidone-ISM; Risvan) – dopamine D_{2} receptor antagonist, serotonin 5-HT_{2A} receptor antagonist, and other actions – schizophrenia
- Risperidone long-acting injectable (Longavo; mdc-IRM; TEV-46000; TV-46000; Uzedy) – dopamine D_{2} receptor antagonist, serotonin 5-HT_{2A} receptor antagonist, and other actions – schizophrenia
- Sertindole (Serdolect) – dopamine D_{2} receptor antagonist, serotonin 5-HT_{2A} receptor antagonist, and other actions – schizophrenia
- Ziprasidone (CP-88059-01; CP-88059-1; Geodon; ME-2112; RQ-00000003; Zeldox) – dopamine D_{2} receptor antagonist, serotonin 5-HT_{2A} receptor antagonist, and other actions – schizophrenia
- Zotepine (Lodopin; Nipolept; Zoleptil) – dopamine D_{1} receptor antagonist, dopamine D_{2} receptor antagonist, serotonin 5-HT_{2A} receptor antagonist, and other actions – schizophrenia

==== Third-generation antipsychotics ====
- Aripiprazole (Abilify; Abilify Asimtufii; Abilify Maintena; Abilify MyCite; Abilitat; Ao Pai; Arlemide; Asimtufii; OPC-14597; OPC-31) – dopamine D_{2} receptor partial agonist, serotonin 5-HT_{2A} receptor antagonist, and other actions – schizophrenia
- Aripiprazole lauroxil (ALNCD; ALKS-9070; ALKS-9072; Aripiprazole Lauroxil NanoCrystal Dispersion; Aristada; Aristada Initio) – dopamine D_{2} receptor partial agonist, serotonin 5-HT_{2A} receptor antagonist, and other actions – schizophrenia
- Brexpiprazole (Lu-AF41156; OPC-34712; OPDC-34712; Rexulti; Rxulti) – dopamine D_{2} receptor partial agonist, serotonin 5-HT_{2A} receptor antagonist, and other actions – schizophrenia
- Cariprazine (CarMP-214; Reagila; RGH-188; Symvenu; Vraylar WID-RGC20) – dopamine D_{2} receptor partial agonist, serotonin 5-HT_{2A} receptor antagonist, and other actions – schizophrenia
- Lumateperone (Caplyta; ITI-007; ITI-722) – dopamine D_{2} receptor partial agonist, serotonin 5-HT_{2A} receptor antagonist, and other actions – schizophrenia

==== Disputed-generation antipsychotics ====
- Amisulpride (aminosultopride; Amitrex; DAN-2163; Deniban; Enorden; Socian; Solian; Sulamid) – dopamine D_{2} and D_{3} receptor antagonist, serotonin 5-HT_{2B} receptor antagonist, serotonin 5-HT_{7} receptor antagonist, and other actions – schizophrenia
- Levosulpiride (L-sulpiride; Levobren; Levopraid; levosulpride; RV-12309) – dopamine D_{2} receptor antagonist, serotonin 5-HT_{4} receptor agonist, and other actions – psychotic disorders
- Loxapine (Loxitane) – dopamine D_{1} receptor antagonist, dopamine D_{2} receptor antagonist, serotonin 5-HT_{2A} receptor antagonist, and other actions – schizophrenia
- Molindone (Moban) – dopamine D_{2} receptor antagonist, serotonin 5-HT_{2B} receptor antagonist, and other actions – schizophrenia
- Nemonapride (emonapride; Emilace; YM-09151) – dopamine D_{2}, D_{3}, and D_{4} receptor antagonist and other actions – schizophrenia
- Remoxipride (Roxiam) – dopamine D_{2} and D_{3} receptor antagonist and sigma receptor modulator – schizophrenia
- Sulpiride (Dogmatil) – dopamine D_{2} and D_{3} receptor antagonist and other actions – schizophrenia
- Sultopride (Barnetil, Barnotil, Topral) – dopamine D_{2} and D_{3} receptor antagonist and other actions – schizophrenia

==== Other antipsychotics ====
- Azacyclonol (γ-pipradrol; Ataractan; Calmeran; Frenoton; Frenquel; Psychosan) – unknown mechanism of action – schizophrenia
- Olanzapine/samidorphan (ALKS-33/olanzapine; ALKS-3831; Lybalvi; olanzapine/ALKS 33; OLZ/SAM; Samidorphan/olanzapine) – combination of olanzapine (dopamine D_{1} receptor antagonist, dopamine D_{2} receptor antagonist, serotonin 5-HT_{2A} receptor antagonist, and other actions) and samidorphan (non-selective opioid receptor antagonist) – schizophrenia
- Pimavanserin (ACP-103; BVF-048; Nuplazid) – serotonin 5-HT_{2A} receptor inverse agonist – psychotic disorders (specifically Parkinson's disease psychosis)
- Xanomeline/trospium chloride (BMS-986510; Cobenfy; KarXT; trospium/LY-246708; trospium/xanomeline) – combination of xanomeline (muscarinic acetylcholine M_{1} and M_{4} receptor agonist) and trospium (peripherally selective non-selective muscarinic acetylcholine receptor antagonist) – schizophrenia

=== Market withdrawal ===
- Remoxipride (A-33547; FLA-731; Remide; Roxiam) – dopamine D_{2} and D_{3} receptor antagonist and sigma receptor modulator – psychotic disorders
- Risperidone sustained-release (Perseris RBP-7000) – dopamine D_{2} receptor antagonist, serotonin 5-HT_{2A} receptor antagonist, and other actions – schizophrenia

=== Off-label drugs ===
- Reserpine (Serpasil) – vesicular monoamine transporter 2 (VMAT2) blocker and monoamine depleting agent – schizophrenia
- Tetrabenazine (Nitoman, Xenazine) – vesicular monoamine transporter 2 (VMAT2) blocker and monoamine depleting agent – schizophrenia

== See also ==
- Lists of investigational drugs
- List of investigational bipolar disorder drugs
- List of investigational aggression drugs
- List of investigational agitation drugs
- List of investigational antidepressants
- List of investigational cognition and memory disorder drugs
- Antipsychotic, typical antipsychotic, and atypical antipsychotic
- Management of schizophrenia
- Psychosis § Treatment
