= Evenamide =

Investigational antipsychotic drug

Clinical data
- Other names: NW-3509; NW-3509A
- Routes of administration: oral
- ATC code: None

Identifiers
- IUPAC name: 2-[2-(3-butoxyphenyl)ethylamino]-N,N-dimethylacetamide
- CAS Number: 1092977-61-1
- PubChem CID: 25105689
- ChemSpider: 44208827
- UNII: ON5S6N53JS
- CompTox Dashboard (EPA): DTXSID101032897

Chemical and physical data
- Formula: C_{16}H_{26}N_{2}O_{2}
- Molar mass: 278.396 g·mol^{−1}
- 3D model (JSmol): Interactive image
- SMILES: CCCCOc1cccc(CCNCC(=O)N(C)C)c1
- InChI: InChI=1S/C16H26N2O2/c1-4-5-11-20-15-8-6-7-14(12-15)9-10-17-13-16(19)18(2)3/h6-8,12,17H,4-5,9-11,13H2,1-3H3; Key:GRHBODILPPXVKN-UHFFFAOYSA-N

Evenamide (INN; developmental codes NW-3509 and NW-3509A) is a selective voltage-gated sodium channel blocker, including (and not limited to) subtypes Na_{v}1.3, Na_{v}1.7, and Na_{v}1.8, which is described as an antipsychotic and is under development by Newron Pharmaceuticals as an add-on therapy for the treatment of schizophrenia. The drug has shown efficacy in animal models of psychosis, mania, depression, and aggression.

The drug was discovered by Newron Pharmaceuticals SpA, a pharmaceutical company located in Italy. Enigma TRS -1 and -2 Phase 3 trials were announced in late 2025.

== Clinical studies ==
In a randomized study with treatment-resistant schizophrenia patients, evenamide was added to the treatment regimen, with the psychological assessors being blinded to whether evenamide was taken. 70% of the participants reported a significant lowering of their impairments; and in 25%, schizophrenia went in full remission. A full double-blind phase III study with treatment-resistant schizophrenia patients is in preparation as of January 2023.

The 4 week placebo trial of 2021 to evaluate the safety, tolerability and preliminary evidence of efficacy of evenamide for people with chronic schizophrenia was selected to address patients who are receiving treatment at constant doses of one of the following atypical antipsychotics: aripiprazole, clozapine, quetiapine, olanzapine, paliperidone or risperidone.

== See also ==
- List of investigational antipsychotics
