= Soluble guanylate cyclase stimulator =

Class of pharmaceutical drugs

Soluble guanylate cyclase (sGC) stimulators are a class of drugs developed to treat heart failure, pulmonary hypertension, and other diseases. The first-in-class medication was riociguat, approved in 2013 for pulmonary hypertension. They have also been investigated for hypertension, systemic sclerosis, and sickle cell disease.

== Background ==
In 1998, the role of nitric oxide (NO) in cardiovascular disease received the Nobel Prize in Physiology. Although NO is still used to treat angina, its side effects, potential for tolerance, short duration of action, and narrow therapeutic index limit its therapeutic use. PDE5 inhibitors increase NO and are approved for erectile dysfunction, pulmonary arterial hypertension (PAH), and benign prostatic hyperplasia, but they are less effective in patients for whom NO production is suppressed, such as people with diabetes or obesity. Soluble guanylate cyclase is one of the downstream targets of NO, but the stimulators operate independently of it. sGC activators, another experimental class of drugs, may be more effective than stimulators when oxidative stress is high.

The drugs are also considered to possibly have the potential to treat kidney disease, lung fibrosis, scleroderma, and sickle cell disease.

== List of drugs ==
=== FDA approved ===
- Riociguat, approved in 2013 for pulmonary hypertension
- Vericiguat, approved in 2021 for heart failure

=== Investigational ===
- Praliciguat was tried in a phase II trial for heart failure with preserved ejection fraction
- Olinciguat was developed for sickle cell disease but its development was discontinued in 2020.
- Zagociguat (CY-6463) is under development for Alzheimer's disease and other indications
