= Ralmitaront =

Investigational antipsychotic

Clinical data
- Other names: RG-7906; RG7906; RO-6889450; RO6889450

Identifiers
- IUPAC name: 5-Ethyl-4-methyl-N-[4-[(2S)-morpholin-2-yl]phenyl]-1H-pyrazole-3-carboxamide
- CAS Number: 2133417-13-5
- PubChem CID: 130429734
- ChemSpider: 88298290
- UNII: QA8MW1Q80P
- KEGG: D11830
- ChEMBL: ChEMBL4594376
- CompTox Dashboard (EPA): DTXSID901336976

Chemical and physical data
- Formula: C_{17}H_{22}N_{4}O_{2}
- Molar mass: 314.389 g·mol^{−1}
- 3D model (JSmol): Interactive image
- SMILES: CCC1=C(C(=NN1)C(=O)NC2=CC=C(C=C2)[C@H]3CNCCO3)C
- InChI: InChI=1S/C17H22N4O2/c1-3-14-11(2)16(21-20-14)17(22)19-13-6-4-12(5-7-13)15-10-18-8-9-23-15/h4-7,15,18H,3,8-10H2,1-2H3,(H,19,22)(H,20,21)/t15-/m1/s1; Key:XHHXGKRFUPEPFM-OAHLLOKOSA-N

Ralmitaront (INN, USAN; developmental code names RG-7906 and RO-6889450) is an investigational antipsychotic drug which was undergoing a Phase II clinical trial for the treatment of negative symptoms in schizophrenia and schizoaffective disorder, but the trial was discontinued due to lack of efficacy. Another Phase II clinical trial targeting acute psychotic symptoms of schizophrenia was also terminated for the same reason. It is a partial agonist of the TAAR1 protein. The medication is being developed by the pharmaceutical company Hoffmann-La Roche. Ralmitaront had completed Phase I clinical trials.

== See also ==
- List of investigational antipsychotics
- Ulotaront
