= Ulotaront =

Investigational antipsychotic

Clinical data
- Other names: SEP-363856; SEP363856; SEP-856; SEP856

Identifiers
- IUPAC name: 1-[(7S)-5,7-dihydro-4H-thieno[2,3-c]pyran-7-yl]-N-methylmethanamine
- CAS Number: 1310426-33-5
- PubChem CID: 89532783
- ChemSpider: 61321168
- UNII: 3K6270MG59
- KEGG: D12474
- ChEBI: CHEBI:228346

Chemical and physical data
- Formula: C_{9}H_{13}NOS
- Molar mass: 183.27 g·mol^{−1}
- 3D model (JSmol): Interactive image
- SMILES: CNC[C@H]1C2=C(CCO1)C=CS2
- InChI: InChI=1S/C9H13NOS/c1-10-6-8-9-7(2-4-11-8)3-5-12-9/h3,5,8,10H,2,4,6H2,1H3/t8-/m0/s1; Key:ABDDQTDRAHXHOC-QMMMGPOBSA-N

Ulotaront (INN; developmental codes SEP-363856, SEP-856) is an investigational antipsychotic that is undergoing clinical trials for the treatment of schizophrenia and psychosis in Parkinson's disease. The medication was discovered in collaboration between PsychoGenics Inc. and Sunovion Pharmaceuticals (which was subsequently merged into Sumitomo Pharma) using PsychoGenics' behavior and AI-based phenotypic drug discovery platform, SmartCube.

Ulotaront is in phase III clinical trial for schizophrenia, phase II/III for generalized anxiety disorder and major depressive disorder, and discontinued for narcolepsy and psychotic disorders.

Research has shown that ulotaront results in a greater reduction from baseline in the PANSS total score than placebo. Treatment with ulotaront, as compared with placebo, was also associated with an improvement in sleep quality. Ulotaront was awarded a Breakthrough Therapy designation due to its increased efficacy and greatly reduced side effects compared to current treatments.

== Adverse effects ==
Some adverse events reported in preliminary clinical trials are somnolence, agitation, nausea, diarrhea, and dyspepsia. The adverse effect profile of ulotaront differs from that of other antipsychotics because its mechanism of action does not involve antagonism of dopamine receptors in the brain, which is responsible for the drug-induced movement disorders (like akathisia) that may occur with those agents.

== Pharmacology ==
=== Pharmacodynamics ===
The mechanism of action of ulotaront in the treatment of schizophrenia is unclear. However, it is thought to be an agonist at the trace amine-associated receptor 1 (TAAR1) and serotonin 5-HT_{1A} receptors. This mechanism of action is unique among available antipsychotics, which generally antagonize dopamine receptors (especially dopamine D_{2} receptor).

Ulotaront is a full agonist of the human TAAR1 with an EC_{50} of 140 nM and an E_{max} of 101.3%. It is also a partial agonist of the serotonin 5-HT_{1A} receptor (EC_{50} = 2,300 nM; E_{max} = 74.7%) and of the serotonin 5-HT_{1D} receptor (EC_{50} = 262 nM; E_{max} = 57.1%). Conversely, its activities at various other targets, such as various other serotonin receptors as well as adrenergic and dopamine receptors, are much less potent.

TAAR1 agonism is known to reduce the firing rate of dopaminergic neurons. The inhibitory effects of TAAR1 agonists on dopaminergic neurotransmission are most pronounced in hyperdopaminergic states.

Ulotaront decreases basal locomotor activity in rodents and this effect was absent in TAAR1 knockout mice. It prevented the hyperlocomotion induced by the NMDA receptor antagonist phencyclidine (PCP). Conversely, ulotaront did not affect dextroamphetamine-induced hyperlocomotion. Similarly, it did not reverse apomorphine-induced climbing behavior.

=== Pharmacokinetics ===
The precise pharmacokinetic profile of ulotaront has not been reported, though the developer has suggested that the pharmacokinetic data supports once daily dosing.

== Research ==
As of 2018, Sunovion, the maker of another antipsychotic called lurasidone (Latuda), is conducting clinical trials on ulotaront in partnership with the preclinical research company PsychoGenics. The US Food and Drug Administration (FDA) has granted ulotaront the breakthrough therapy designation. In addition to schizophrenia, ulotaront is also being studied for the treatment of psychosis associated with Parkinson's disease.

The Brief Negative Symptom Scale (BNSS) has been used to assess the effect of Ulotaront on the negative symptoms of schizophrenia.

In July 2023, the pharmaceutical company behind the drug announced that the drug had failed to outperform placebo in the treatment of acutely psychotic patients with schizophrenia, as measured by the PANSS.

== See also ==
- List of investigational antipsychotics
- Ralmitaront
