= Compound 22 (TAAR1 antagonist) =

Clinical data
- Other names: C22
- Drug class: Trace amine-associated receptor 1 (TAAR1) antagonist; Other unknown actions

Identifiers
- IUPAC name: N-[(2,4-dichlorophenyl)methyl]-1-[4-(1,2,4-triazol-1-ylmethyl)phenyl]methanamine
- PubChem CID: 37762070
- ChemSpider: 35523087
- ChEMBL: ChEMBL3771158

Chemical and physical data
- Formula: C_{17}H_{16}Cl_{2}N_{4}
- Molar mass: 347.24 g·mol^{−1}
- 3D model (JSmol): Interactive image
- SMILES: C1=CC(=CC=C1CNCC2=C(C=C(C=C2)Cl)Cl)CN3C=NC=N3
- InChI: InChI=1S/C17H16Cl2N4/c18-16-6-5-15(17(19)7-16)9-20-8-13-1-3-14(4-2-13)10-23-12-21-11-22-23/h1-7,11-12,20H,8-10H2; Key:ZNYUDRCDVDXULZ-UHFFFAOYSA-N

Compound 22 is a low-potency and non-selective trace amine-associated receptor 1 (TAAR1) antagonist that was identified in 2015 and was further studied in animals in 2018. The drug enhances the firing rates of dopaminergic neurons ex vivo and potentiates psychostimulant-induced hyperlocomotion and stereotypy in rodents in vivo. The latter effects are partially or fully independent of the TAAR1 however, with the mechanisms underlying these effects being unknown. Compound 22, along with EPPTB and RTI-7470-44, is one of the only TAAR1 antagonists that has been identified as of 2022.

== Pharmacology ==
=== Pharmacodynamics ===
==== Actions ====
Compound 22 is a low-potency antagonist of the trace amine-associated receptor 1 (TAAR1). It has shown significant inhibition of TAAR1 signaling at a concentration of 100 μM in vitro. The drug's IC_{50} value for TAAR1 antagonism is unknown but is greater than 100 μM.

Compound 22 was also screened for off-target activity at 47 targets at a concentration of 10 μM. The screened targets included monoamine receptors, monoamine transporters, histamine receptors, muscarinic acetylcholine receptors, glutamate receptors, GABA receptors, opioid receptors, and sigma receptors. There were five hits (>50% binding inhibition), which included the serotonin transporter (SERT), dopamine transporter (DAT), and norepinephrine transporter (NET), as well as the sigma σ_{1} and σ_{2} receptors. Its affinities (K_{i}) were 1,800 nM for the SERT, 1,053 nM for the DAT, 1,902 nM for the NET, 276 nM for the sigma σ_{1} receptor, and 412 nM for the sigma σ_{2} receptor. Although compound 22 bound with significant affinity to the DAT, it did not inhibit dopamine reuptake and did not interfere with cocaine-induced dopamine reuptake inhibition at concentrations of up to 100 μM.

==== Effects ====
Compound 22 increases the firing rate of dopaminergic neurons in mouse ventral tegmental area (VTA) slices ex vivo similarly to the TAAR1 antagonist EPPTB. It increased the firing rate by 88% at a concentration of 100 μM, whereas EPPTB increased the firing rate by 74% at a concentration of 10 nM.

Compound 22 decreased basal locomotor activity in mice in vivo significantly by 58% at 5 mg/kg and non-significantly by 26% at 30 mg/kg. It was not found to stimulate locomotion at any dose. In subsequent experiments, compound 22 did not significantly affect locomotor activity at 5 or 25 mg/kg in either normal mice or TAAR1 knockout mice.

The drug dose-dependently enhanced amphetamine-induced hyperlocomotion in mice. The increases were 28% at 5 mg/kg, 44% at 15 mg/kg, 57% at 20 mg/kg, and 77% at 30 mg/kg, but no difference at 50 mg/kg. Compound 22 likewise potentiated cocaine-induced hyperlocomotion in mice. The increases were 77% at 5 mg/kg, 84% at 15 mg/kg, and 124% at 25 mg/kg. Compound 22 augmented amphetamine- and cocaine-induced stereotypy as well.

In subsequent experiments, compound 22 potentiated amphetamine-induced hyperlocomotion in normal mice by 44% at a dose of 5 mg/kg but had no significant effect at doses of 2.5 and 15 mg/kg. In TAAR1 knockout mice, compound 22 augmented amphetamine-induced hyperlocomotion by 84% at a dose of 15 mg/kg. The drug dose-dependently potentiated cocaine-induced hyperlocomotion at doses of 5, 15, and 25 mg/kg to similar extents in both normal mice and TAAR1 knockout mice. Similar effects of compound 22 were found for amphetamine- and cocaine-induced stereotypy in normal mice and TAAR1 knockout mice.

On the basis of the preceding findings, it was concluded that compound 22 augments psychostimulant-induced hyperlocomotion in a manner that is partially or fully independent of TAAR1 antagonism. The biological targets and mechanisms of compound 22 mediating these effects are unknown.

=== Pharmacokinetics ===
Compound 22 was predicted to have good physicochemical and pharmacokinetic properties and to be able to cross the blood–brain barrier. As an example, its predicted logP is 3.3 to 3.7. In accordance with predictions, compound showed clear centrally mediated effects in rodents, indicating that it indeed crosses the blood–brain barrier.

== History ==
Compound 22 was identified in 2015 by virtual screening of over 3 million compounds at the human TAAR1 in silico followed by experimental evaluation of 42 top candidate compounds at the TAAR1 in vitro. Compound 22 is one of the only TAAR1 antagonists that has been identified as of 2022.
