= RO5203648 =

Clinical data
- Other names: RO-5203648
- Drug class: Trace amine-associated receptor 1 (TAAR1) partial agonist

Identifiers
- IUPAC name: (4S)-4-(3,4-dichlorophenyl)-4,5-dihydro-1,3-oxazol-2-amine
- CAS Number: 1043491-54-8
- PubChem CID: 24966113
- ChemSpider: 34959808
- ChEMBL: ChEMBL3680154

Chemical and physical data
- Formula: C_{9}H_{8}Cl_{2}N_{2}O
- Molar mass: 231.08 g·mol^{−1}
- 3D model (JSmol): Interactive image
- SMILES: C1[C@@H](N=C(O1)N)C2=CC(=C(C=C2)Cl)Cl
- InChI: InChI=1S/C9H8Cl2N2O/c10-6-2-1-5(3-7(6)11)8-4-14-9(12)13-8/h1-3,8H,4H2,(H2,12,13)/t8-/m1/s1; Key:HGGPGNSCBBAGJN-MRVPVSSYSA-N

RO5203648 is a trace amine-associated receptor 1 (TAAR1) partial agonist. It is a potent and highly selective partial agonist of both rodent and primate TAAR1. The drug suppresses the effects of psychostimulants like cocaine and methamphetamine. It also produces a variety of other behavioral effects, such as antidepressant-like, antipsychotic-like, and antiaddictive effects. Research with RO5203648 has led to interest in TAAR1 agonists for potential treatment of drug addiction. RO5203648 itself was not developed for potential medical use due to poor expected human pharmacokinetics.

== Pharmacology ==
=== Pharmacodynamics ===
==== Actions ====
RO5203648 binds to the mouse, rat, cynomolgus monkey, and human TAAR1 all with high affinity (K_{i} = 0.5–6.8 nM). It is a potent partial agonist in all species (EC_{50} = 4.0 to 31 nM), with an efficacy of 48 to 73% relative to the endogenous TAAR1 agonists β-phenethylamine and tyramine and the TAAR1 full agonist RO5166017. RO5203648 is highly selective for the TAAR1, showing ≥130-fold selectivity for the mouse TAAR1 over 149 other targets.

RO5203648 at TAAR1 in different species
Species	Affinity (K_{i}, nM)	EC_{50} (nM)	E_{max} (%)
Mouse	0.5	2.1–4.0	48–71%
Rat	1.0	6.8	59%
Monkey	2.6	31	69%
Human	6.8	30	73%

==== Effects ====
RO5203648 has been found to increase the firing rate of ventral tegmental area (VTA) dopaminergic neurons and dorsal raphe nucleus (DRN) serotonergic neurons in mouse brain slices ex vivo. This is in contrast to the TAAR1 full agonist RO5166017, which suppresses their firing rates, but is analogous to the TAAR1 antagonist EPPTB, which dramatically increases their firing rates. RO5203648 failed to show these effects in the neurons of TAAR1 knockout mice, indicating that its actions are mediated by interactions with the TAAR1. RO5203648 alone does not affect electrically evoked dopamine release or reuptake (as measured by tau) in rat nucleus accumbens (NAc) slices ex vivo. Conversely, RO5203648 prevented cocaine-induced dopamine elevations in this system without affecting the dopamine reuptake inhibition of cocaine. As such, its inhibition of cocaine's dopaminergic actions is likely to be independent of dopamine transporter (DAT) interactions. RO5203648 did not affect methamphetamine-induced dopamine efflux or reuptake inhibition in rat striatal synaptosomes in vitro. However, RO5203648 blunted and delayed methamphetamine-induced dopamine elevations in the NAc in rodents in vivo. Hence, as with cocaine, RO5203648's regulation of methamphetamine's actions appears to be independent of DAT interactions.

Some in-vitro studies have suggested that TAAR1 agonism by amphetamines and β-phenethylamine may mediate induction of monoamine release and reuptake inhibition by these agents. However, a subsequent study failed to replicate these findings under similar conditions. In addition, as previously described, RO5203648 did not affect methamphetamine-induced dopamine release and reuptake inhibition in synaptosomes in vitro. The dopamine elevations and psychostimulant-like effects of amphetamines are not only preserved but are actually augmented in TAAR1 knockout mice in vivo. Concordant in-vivo findings have been made with amphetamines combined with TAAR1 agonists and antagonists as well as with TAAR1 overexpression. It appears that TAAR1 agonism by amphetamines, such as amphetamine, methamphetamine, and MDMA, auto-inhibits their monoaminergic effects. Conversely, most cathinones lack TAAR1 agonism, and this might enhance their effects compared to amphetamines.

RO5203648 does not significantly affect basal locomotion. Conversely, the drug has been found to dose-dependently suppress cocaine-induced hyperlocomotion in mice and rats, whereas it only suppressed dextroamphetamine-induced hyperactivity at a high dose in rats and did not affect dextroamphetamine-induced hyperlocomotion in mice. RO5203648 reduced early but potentiated late hyperlocomotion induced by methamphetamine. With chronic administration of RO5203648 and methamphetamine, RO5203648 dose-dependently and progressively decreased methamphetamine-induced hyperlocomotion. TAAR1 full agonists like RO5166017 and RO5256390 also suppress psychostimulant-induced hyperlocomotion. RO5203648 suppressed spontaneous hyperactivity in a novel environment in dopamine transporter (DAT) knockout mice, similarly to antipsychotics like haloperidol and olanzapine. RO5203648 has also been found to suppress hyperlocomotion induced by the NMDA receptor antagonist L-687,414 or in genetically modified mice with a hypoactive NMDA receptor. The effects of RO5203648 on hyperdopaminergic- and hypoglutamatergic-mediated hyperlocomotion are similar to those of the TAAR1 full agonist RO5166017.

The drug has shown anti-cataleptic, pro-cognitive, antipsychotic-like, antidepressant-like, anxiolytic-like, anti-addictive, and wakefulness-promoting effects in animals. RO5203648, as well as the TAAR1 full agonist RO5256390, have been found to suppress cocaine and methamphetamine self-administration, and hence presumably their rewarding and reinforcing effects. RO5203648 also blocked methamphetamine-induced locomotor sensitization, but cross-sensitized with methamphetamine at the highest dose. RO5203648 by itself is not self-administered in animals, suggesting that it lacks reinforcing effects and misuse liability of its own.

=== Pharmacokinetics ===
RO5203648 showed favorable pharmacokinetics orally and intravenously in mice, rats, and monkeys. However, it was found to be very rapidly metabolized in human hepatocytes in vitro.

== Chemistry ==
In terms of chemical structure, RO5203648 is a 2-aminooxazoline derivative. This group also includes a number of other selective TAAR1 ligands, including the near-full agonist RO5166017, the full agonist RO5256390, and the partial agonist RO5263397. RO5203648 is also very closely structurally related to the monoamine releasing agents and psychostimulants aminorex and clominorex.

== History ==
RO5203648 was first described by 2012. It was the first selective TAAR1 partial agonist to be developed. The drug followed the first TAAR1 antagonist EPPTB and the first TAAR1 full agonist RO5166017. It was under investigation for potential clinical use in humans, but showed indication of very rapid human metabolism in vitro. As a result, it was deselected from development, and other compounds, such as the TAAR1 partial agonist RO5263397, were pursued instead.

== See also ==
- RO5073012 – TAAR1 weak partial agonist
- RO5166017 – TAAR1 partial or full agonist
- RO5256390 – TAAR1 partial or full agonist
- RO5263397 – TAAR1 partial agonist
- EPPTB – TAAR1 antagonist/inverse agonist
