= RO5256390 =

Chemical compound

RO-5256390
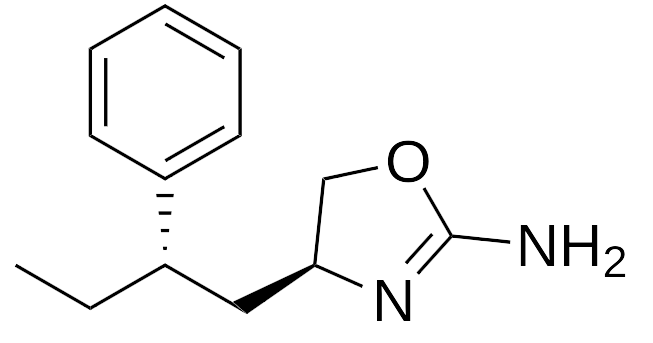

Clinical data
- Drug class: Trace amine-associated receptor 1 (TAAR1) partial or full agonist

Identifiers
- IUPAC name: (S)-4-((S)-2-phenyl-butyl)-4,5-dihydro-oxazol-2-ylamine
- CAS Number: 1043495-96-0
- PubChem CID: 24963286
- ChemSpider: 34959936
- ChEMBL: ChEMBL3684869

Chemical and physical data
- Formula: C_{13}H_{18}N_{2}O
- Molar mass: 218.300 g·mol^{−1}
- 3D model (JSmol): Interactive image
- SMILES: NC1=N[C@@H](C[C@@H](C2=CC=CC=C2)CC)CO1
- InChI: InChI=1S/C13H18N2O/c1-2-10(11-6-4-3-5-7-11)8-12-9-16-13(14)15-12/h3-7,10,12H,2,8-9H2,1H3,(H2,14,15)/t10-,12-/m0/s1; Key:IXDKFUBXESWHSL-JQWIXIFHSA-N

RO5256390 or RO-5256390 is a drug developed by Hoffmann-La Roche which acts as an agonist for the trace amine associated receptor 1 (TAAR1). It is a full agonist of the rat, cynomolgus monkey, and human TAAR1, but a partial agonist of the mouse TAAR1.

== Pharmacology ==
=== Pharmacodynamics ===
==== Actions ====
RO5256390 is a full agonist of the rat, cynomolgus monkey, and human TAAR1, but a high-efficacy partial agonist of the mouse TAAR1.

RO5256390 at TAAR1 in different species
| Species | Affinity (K_{i}, nM) | EC_{50} (nM) | E_{max} (%) |
|---|---|---|---|
| Mouse | 4.4 | 2–18 | 68–79% |
| Rat | 2.9 | 5.1 | 107% |
| Monkey | 16 | 16 | 100% |
| Human | 24 | 16 | 98% |

==== Effects ====
RO5256390 has been found to suppress the firing rates of ventral tegmental area (VTA) dopaminergic neurons and dorsal raphe nucleus (DRN) serotonergic neurons in mouse brain slices ex vivo. This effect was absent in slices from TAAR1 knockout mice. Similarly, acute RO5256390 suppressed VTA dopaminergic and DRN serotonergic neuronal excitability in rats in vivo, whereas the excitability of locus coeruleus (LC) noradrenergic neurons was unaffected. In contrast with acute exposure however, chronic administration of RO5256390 for 14 days increased the excitability of VTA dopaminergic and DRN serotonergic neurons. The drug has been found to dose-dependently block cocaine-induced inhibition of dopamine clearance (reuptake inhibition) in rat nucleus accumbens (NAc) slices ex vivo whilst having no effect on dopamine clearance by itself.

RO5256390 has been found to fully suppress the hyperlocomotion (a psychostimulant-like effect) induced by cocaine in rodents. In addition, it dose-dependently inhibited the hyperlocomotion induced by the NMDA receptor antagonists phencyclidine (PCP) and L-687,414. RO5256390 is said to produce a brain activity pattern similar to that of the antipsychotic olanzapine in rodents and hence is presumed to have antipsychotic-like properties. In contrast to classical antipsychotics however, RO5256390 did not produce extrapyramidal-like symptoms in rodents and instead could reduce the catalepsy induced by haloperidol. RO5256390 has been found to dose-dependently inhibit cocaine self-administration and context-triggered cocaine-seeking behavior in rodents.

RO5256390 shows robust aversive and locomotor-suppressing effects in rodents that are dependent on TAAR1 activation. Similar aversive effects have also been observed with other TAAR1 agonists like RO5263397 and RO5166017. RO5256390 has been shown to decrease motor hyperactivity, novelty-induced locomotor activity, and induce anxiolytic-like effects in the spontaneously hypertensive rat (SHR), a rodent model of attention deficit hyperactivity disorder (ADHD). In contrast to the TAAR1 partial agonist RO5263397, RO5256390 did not produce antidepressant-like effects in rodents. Conversely however, both agents produced antidepressant-like effects in monkeys.

RO5256390 has been found to produce pro-cognitive effects in rodents and monkeys. It has been shown to strongly suppress rapid eye movement (REM) sleep in rodents. On the other hand, it did not promote wakefulness in rodents. RO5256390 has been shown to block compulsive and binge-like eating behavior in rats. For this reason, it is being investigated as a potential drug to treat binge eating disorder.

== History ==
RO5256390 was first described in the scientific literature by 2013.

== See also ==
- RO5073012 – TAAR1 weak partial agonist
- RO5166017 – TAAR1 partial or full agonist
- RO5203648 – TAAR1 partial agonist
- RO5263397 – TAAR1 partial agonist
- EPPTB – TAAR1 antagonist/inverse agonist
