= RO5263397 =

TAAR1 agonist

Clinical data
- Other names: RO-5263397; Ro 5263397; Ro-5263397
- Drug class: Trace amine-associated receptor 1 (TAAR1) partial or full agonist

Identifiers
- IUPAC name: (4S)-4-(3-fluoro-2-methylphenyl)-4,5-dihydro-1,3-oxazol-2-amine
- CAS Number: 1357266-05-7
- PubChem CID: 56835991
- ChemSpider: 35523070
- UNII: Y2P4KD8GDR
- ChEMBL: ChEMBL3781694

Chemical and physical data
- Formula: C_{10}H_{11}FN_{2}O
- Molar mass: 194.209 g·mol^{−1}
- 3D model (JSmol): Interactive image
- SMILES: CC1=C(C=CC=C1F)[C@H]2COC(=N2)N
- InChI: InChI=1S/C10H11FN2O/c1-6-7(3-2-4-8(6)11)9-5-14-10(12)13-9/h2-4,9H,5H2,1H3,(H2,12,13)/t9-/m1/s1; Key:IOHOUWIYOVWGHV-SECBINFHSA-N

RO5263397, or RO-5263397, is a trace amine-associated receptor 1 (TAAR1) partial or full agonist which is used in scientific research. It is the most well-studied of all of the synthetic TAAR1 ligands. In addition to its use in research, RO5263397 is or was under development for potential clinical use as a medication.

== Pharmacology ==
=== Pharmacodynamics ===
==== Actions ====
RO5263397 is a trace amine-associated receptor 1 (TAAR1) partial agonist to full agonist. Its EC_{50} values are 0.12 to 7.5 nM for the mouse TAAR1 (mTAAR1), 35 to 47 nM for the rat TAAR1 (rTAAR1), 251 nM at the cynomolgus monkey TAAR1, and 17 to 85 nM for the human TAAR1 (hTAAR1). Its intrinsic activity (E_{max}) is 59 to 100% at the mTAAR1, 69 to 76% at the rTAAR1, 85% at the cynomolgus monkey TAAR1, and 81 to 82% at the hTAAR1.

RO5263397 at TAAR1 in different species
| Species | Affinity (K_{i}, nM) | EC_{50} (nM) | E_{max} (%) |
|---|---|---|---|
| Mouse | 0.9 | 0.12–7.5 | 59–100% |
| Rat | 9.1 | 35–47 | 69–76% |
| Monkey | 24 | 251 | 85% |
| Human | 4.1 | 17–85 | 81–82% |

The drug was found to have 392-fold higher potency at the mTAAR1 compared to the hTAAR1 in vitro in one comparative study, although it still activated the hTAAR1 with low-nanomolar potency (EC_{50} = 0.12 nM).

==== Effects ====
RO5263397 has been found to increase the firing rates of ventral tegmental area (VTA) dopaminergic neurons and dorsal raphe nucleus (DRN) serotonergic neurons in mouse brain slices ex vivo. This is in contrast to the high-efficacy TAAR1 agonists p-tyramine, RO5166017, and RO5256390, which inhibit these neurons in such systems, but is similar to the increased firing rates with the TAAR1 antagonist EPPTB, supporting a partially agonistic profile of RO5263397 at the mTAAR1. RO5263397 can partially and dose-dependently reverse the suppressive effects of RO5256390 on monoaminergic neuron firing in brain slices ex vivo. In contrast to VTA dopaminergic and DRN serotonergic neurons, RO5263397 had no effect on locus coeruleus (LC) noradrenergic neurons in the system, where the TAAR1 is notably not expressed. The effects of RO5263397 on the firing frequencies of monoaminergic neurons are absent in TAAR1 knockout mice. RO5263397 has been found to fully prevent methamphetamine-induced dopamine release in rat nucleus accumbens core (NAcc) brain slices ex vivo. Conversely, RO5263397 by itself had no effect on dopamine overflow in rat NAcc slices ex vivo.

RO5263397 alone has no effect on locomotor activity in rodents in vivo. Similarly, RO5263397 did not affect locomotor activity in monkeys. Conversely, RO5263397 has been found to dose-dependently and fully inhibit cocaine-induced hyperlocomotion in mice in vivo. Likewise, it dose-dependently inhibited hyperlocomotion induced by the NMDA receptor antagonists phencyclidine (PCP) and L-687,414 in mice in vivo. The TAAR1 full agonist RO5166017 and the high-efficacy TAAR1 partial agonist RO5256390, as well as the antipsychotic olanzapine, produced similar effects in these paradigms. Relatedly, RO5263397 produced a pattern of brain activity in rodents similar to that of antipsychotics. In addition, RO5263397 potently suppresses hyperlocomotion in dopamine transporter (DAT) knockout mice. The preceding findings suggest that TAAR1 agonists like RO5263397 have antipsychotic-like properties. In contrast to classical antipsychotics however, RO5263397 did not show extrapyramidal-like symptoms like catalepsy in mice, and instead partially prevented haloperidol-induced catalepsy, suggesting the potential for an improved tolerability profile.

RO5263397 has been shown to reduce behavioral sensitization induced by cocaine in mice. Similarly, it reduces the expression but not development of conditioned place preference (CPP) by cocaine in mice. Analogously to cocaine, RO5263397 dose-dependently attenuates behavioral sensitization to methamphetamine, reduces self-administration of methamphetamine, and blocks reinstatement of methamphetamine-seeking behaviors in rodents. It also attenuates methamphetamine-induced impulsivity in rodents. In general, the drug has been found to suppress methamphetamine-, cocaine, and nicotine-induced stimulant-like and reinforcing effects in animals in vivo. Analogous findings have been made for morphine and ethanol. RO5263397 has similar effects compared to TAAR1 full agonists like RO5256390 in vivo in terms of psychostimulant modulation. Unlike methamphetamine and other misused drugs, RO5263397 itself is not self-administered at any dose and shows no misuse liability.

The drug has shown wakefulness-promoting, pro-cognitive-like and antidepressant-like effects in rodents and/or monkeys. The wakefulness-promoting effects of RO5263397 appear to be mediated through dopaminergic signaling, specifically increased activation of dopamine D_{1} and D_{2} receptors. Similarly to other TAAR1 agonists like RO5166017 and RO5256390, RO5263397 shows aversive effects in animals. The drug has been reported to affect measures of executive function in rats, such as increasing attention, decreasing cognitive flexibility, and modifying impulsivity. RO5263397 has been reported to inhibit aggression and autism-esque irritability-like behavior induced by serotonin depletion and prenatal exposure to valproic acid.

=== Pharmacokinetics ===
RO5263397 has shown favorable pharmacokinetic properties for in vivo use based on its physicochemical properties and preclinical research. It is mainly metabolized by N-glucuronidation in humans. UGT2B10 polymorphisms can result in profoundly altered exposure to RO5263397 in humans. Implicated polymorphisms appear to be especially prevalent in people of African descent.

== History ==
RO5263397 was first described in the scientific literature by 2013. Some findings from a clinical study were reported in 2015.

== Clinical development ==
The drug was under development by Roche for treatment of schizophrenia and reached phase 3 clinical trials for this indication by 2019. The phase 2 results of RO5263397 do not appear to have been disclosed as of this date. However, some findings from one clinical study were published in 2015.

== See also ==
- RO5073012 – TAAR1 weak partial agonist
- RO5166017 – TAAR1 partial or full agonist
- RO5203648 – TAAR1 partial agonist
- RO5256390 – TAAR1 partial or full agonist
- EPPTB – TAAR1 antagonist/inverse agonist
