= EPPTB =

Chemical compound

Clinical data
- Other names: Ro 5212773; Ro-5212773; Ro5212773; RO-5212773; RO5212773
- Drug class: Trace amine-associated receptor 1 (TAAR1) antagonist or inverse agonist

Identifiers
- IUPAC name: N-(3-ethoxyphenyl)-4-pyrrolidin-1-yl-3-trifluoromethylbenzamide
- CAS Number: 1110781-88-8
- PubChem CID: 25175634
- IUPHAR/BPS: 5457
- ChemSpider: 26387935
- ChEMBL: ChEMBL1669669
- CompTox Dashboard (EPA): DTXSID501030324

Chemical and physical data
- Formula: C_{20}H_{21}F_{3}N_{2}O_{2}
- Molar mass: 378.395 g·mol^{−1}
- 3D model (JSmol): Interactive image; Interactive image
- SMILES: CCOc2cc(ccc2)NC(=O)c(cc1C(F)(F)F)ccc1N3CCCC3; CCOc1cccc(c1)NC(=O)c2ccc(c(c2)C(F)(F)F)N3CCCC3
- InChI: InChI=1S/C20H21F3N2O2/c1-2-27-16-7-5-6-15(13-16)24-19(26)14-8-9-18(25-10-3-4-11-25)17(12-14)20(21,22)23/h5-9,12-13H,2-4,10-11H2,1H3,(H,24,26); Key:KLFVWQCQUXXLOU-UHFFFAOYSA-N

EPPTB, also known as RO5212773 or RO-5212773, is a drug developed by Hoffmann-La Roche which acts as a potent and selective antagonist or inverse agonist of the trace amine-associated receptor 1 (TAAR1). The drug was the first selective antagonist developed for the TAAR1. It is a potent antagonist of the mouse and rat TAAR1, but is dramatically less potent as an antagonist of the human TAAR1. EPPTB has been used in scientific research to demonstrate an important role for TAAR1 in regulation of dopaminergic signaling in the limbic system.

== Pharmacology ==
=== Pharmacodynamics ===
==== Actions ====
EPPTB acts as a potent and selective trace amine-associated receptor 1 (TAAR1) full antagonist. Although EPPTB has high affinity for the mouse TAAR1 (mTAAR1) (K_{i} = 0.9 nM), it has much lower affinity for rat TAAR1 (rTAAR1) (K_{i} = 942 nM) and human TAAR1 (hTAAR1) (K_{i} = >5,000 nM), which limits its use in research. While the mTAAR1 and hTAAR1 have similar functions and bind similar ligands, the actual binding affinities of individual ligands often vary significantly between the two versions of the receptor.

Compared to the mTAAR1 (IC_{50} = 27.5 nM), EPPTB is 272-fold less potent at the hTAAR1 (IC_{50} = 7,487 nM) and 165-fold less potent at the rTAAR1 (IC_{50} = 4,539 nM) in vitro. EPPTB seems to not be an antagonist of the TAAR1 but rather an inverse agonist, reducing mTAAR1-stimulated cAMP production (–12.3 ± 4.7%).

EPPTB at TAAR1 in different species
Species	Affinity (K_{i}, nM)	IC_{50} (nM)	E_{max} (%)
Mouse	0.9	27.5	–12%
Rat	942	4,539	0%
Human	>5,000	7,487	0%

EPPTB has no known significant activity at other targets besides the TAAR1.

==== Effects ====
EPPTB dramatically increases the firing rates of dopamine neurons in ventral tegmental area (VTA) slices and of serotonin neurons in dorsal raphe nucleus (DRN) slices ex vivo. Similarly, EPPTB enhances electrically evoked dopamine release in nucleus accumbens (NAcc) but not dorsal striatum (DStr) slices ex vivo. However, despite the increased dopamine neuron firing rates, basal extracellular dopamine levels in the striatum were not enhanced in TAAR1 knockout mice. EPPTB also blocks the suppression of dopamine neuron firing and evoked dopamine release in VTA and NAcc slices by TAAR1 agonists like tyramine and RO5166017 ex vivo. EPPTB blocked the suppression of DRN serotonin neuron firing by tyramine and RO5166017 as well. The preceding effects of EPPTB were absent in slices from TAAR1 knockout mice. As with ex vivo studies, EPPTB enhances VTA dopamine neuron firing rates in vivo in rats and prevents the suppression of the firing of these neurons by high doses of LSD (a serotonergic psychedelic and potent rodent TAAR1 agonist) and by apomorphine (a dopamine D_{2} receptor agonist). The inhibition of dopamine and serotonin neuron firing rates by TAAR1 signaling appears to be mediated by tonic activation of inwardly rectifying potassiums (IRK) channels and consequent neuronal inhibition.

The TAAR1 partial agonists RO5203648 and RO5263397 enhance the firing rates of dopamine and serotonin neurons in brain slices ex vivo. These findings suggest that the TAAR1 is constitutively and/or tonically active and that TAAR1 partial agonists produce net antagonism. However, TAAR1 partial agonists like RO5203648 have shown effects similar to those of TAAR1 full agonists like RO5166017 in vivo, for instance suppression of hyperlocomotion induced by psychostimulants like cocaine and dextroamphetamine and by NMDA receptor antagonists like L-687,414.

In an unpublished study, EPPTB was reported to substantially reduce methamphetamine-induced hyperlocomotion in mice chronically exposed to methamphetamine in vivo, an effect that was absent in TAAR1 knockout mice. This was interpreted as possible support for TAAR1 agonism mediating psychostimulant-like effects of amphetamines. In other research however, the low-efficacy and antagonist-like TAAR1 partial agonist RO5073012 (E_{max} ≈ 25% for mTAAR1) did not affect amphetamine-induced hyperlocomotion in normal mice and substantially rescued amphetamine-induced hyperlocomotion in the context of transgenic TAAR1 overexpression, a situation in which amphetamine-induced hyperlocomotion is otherwise weak and dramatically reduced compared to usual.

The TAAR1 agonist 3-iodothyronamine (T1AM), but not the TAAR1 agonists β-phenethylamine or tyramine, increased tyrosine hydroxylase (TA) phosphorylation and expected functional activity in DStr slices ex vivo. This effect involved CaMKII and PKA activation. In accordance with the enhanced expected TH activity, higher L-DOPA accumulation was observed in animals treated with T1AM and a DOPA decarboxylase inhibitor. These effects of T1AM were abolished by TAAR1 knockout and by EPPTB. In accordance with the preceding findings, T1AM also enhanced electrically evoked dopamine release in DStr slices ex vivo. This effect was likewise reduced by TAAR1 knockout and by EPPTB. By itself, EPPTB had no effect on evoked dopamine release in DStr slices ex vivo. The preceding findings conflict with previous results that TAAR1 signaling inhibits the firing rates of VTA dopamine neurons. These differing findings may be related to differential regulation of dopaminergic signaling in the VTA versus the DStr as well as other factors. On the other hand, previous studies have found that TAAR1 agonism blunted MDMA- and para-chloroamphetamine (PCA)-induced dopamine release in both the ventral and dorsal striatum.

Owing to their pro-dopaminergic effects, TAAR1 antagonists like EPPTB are not expected to be useful in the treatment of drug addiction, but might be useful in the treatment of hypodopaminergic conditions like Parkinson's disease. Relatedly, systemic or intra-NAcc shell administration of the TAAR1 agonist RO5166017 reduced drug-induced reinstatement of cocaine-seeking in rats and prevented drug priming-induced CaMKIIα activation in the NAcc shell. CaMKIIα was inhibited but PKA, PKC, ERK1/2, CREB, or GSK3β were unaffected in NAcc slices from rats administered RO5166017. The behavioral effects were blocked by viral expression of CaMKIIα in the NAcc shell. In contrast to RO5166017, injection of EPPTB into the NAcc shell augmented drug-induced reinstatement of cocaine-seeking and enhanced CAMKIIα activity.

Neither EPPTB, RO5166017, nor TAAR1 KO affected dopamine reuptake in NAcc or DStr slices ex vivo, indicating that TAAR1 does not affect the function of the dopamine transporter (DAT). These findings contradict previous findings of the TAAR1 modulating DAT activity that were mostly from in-vitro cell culture studies conducted by a single research group. On the other hand, EPPTB has been found to increase the affinity of dopamine for the dopamine D_{2} receptor and to reduce the desensitization rate of these receptors in VTA slices ex vivo, similarly to what has been observed for TAAR1 knockout mice. Likewise, EPPTB reduced the desensitization rate of serotonin 5-HT_{1A} receptors in DRN slices ex vivo.

EPPTB does not affect anxiety or has anxiolytic effects in the elevated plus maze and does not affect locomotor activity in the open field test in animals. Similarly, locomotion is unchanged in TAAR1 knockout mice. In contrast to EPPTB, TAAR1 agonists show anxiolytic or anxiogenic effects in different studies as well as hypolocomotive effects. EPPTB has shown anticonvulsant and neuroprotective effects in preclinical research. EPPTB has been found to reduce the 5-hydroxytryptophan (5-HTP)-induced but not psilocybin-induced head-twitch response (HTR) in rodents.

EPPTB is an antagonist of the effects of monoaminergic activity enhancers (MAEs) like selegiline and benzofuranylpropylaminopentane (BPAP) in vitro, for instance enhancement of exocytotic dopamine release in the striatum. Selegiline is a weak mTAAR1 agonist in vitro. In relation to the preceding, it has been hypothesized that the effects of MAEs may be mediated by TAAR1 agonism.

=== Pharmacokinetics ===
EPPTB shows good bioavailability with intraperitoneal administration. It crosses the blood–brain barrier and has a favorable ratio of brain-to-plasma concentrations (0.5). Systemic administration produces centrally mediated effects in animals. However, the drug has high clearance, and this has limited its research usefulness.

== History ==
EPPTB was first described in the scientific literature by 2009. It was the first selective antagonist of the TAAR1 to be discovered. The drug was identified via high-throughput screening (HTS) of approximately 788,000 compounds followed by structure–activity optimization. For many years, EPPTB was the only TAAR1 antagonist available for scientific research. In 2022 however, the TAAR1 antagonist RTI-7470-44, a potent antagonist of the hTAAR1 and to a much lesser extent of the mTAAR1 and rTAAR1, was described.

== See also ==
- RTI-7470-44 – human TAAR1 antagonist
- RO5073012 – TAAR1 weak partial agonist
- RO5166017 – TAAR1 partial or full agonist
- RO5203648 – TAAR1 partial agonist
- RO5256390 – TAAR1 partial or full agonist
- RO5263397 – TAAR1 partial agonist
