= RO5166017 =

Chemical compound

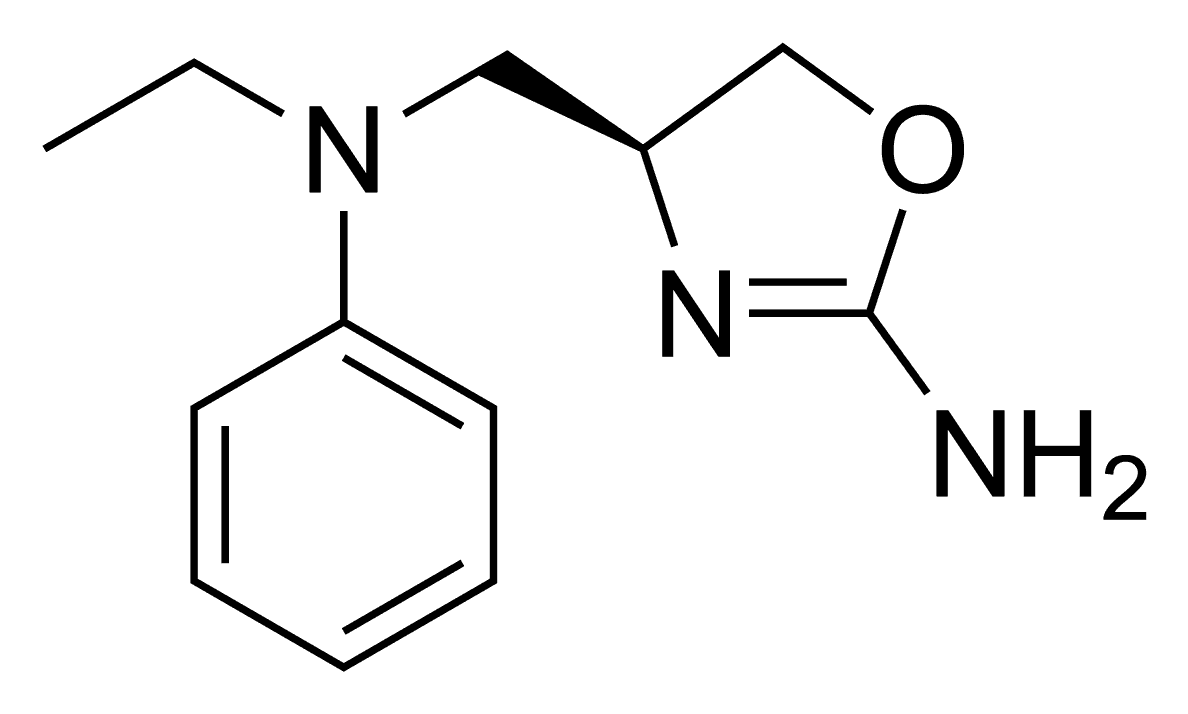

Clinical data
- Drug class: Trace amine-associated receptor 1 (TAAR1) partial or near-full agonist

Identifiers
- IUPAC name: (S)-4-[(ethyl-phenyl-amino)-methyl]-4,5-dihydro-oxazol-2-ylamine
- CAS Number: 1048346-74-2
- PubChem CID: 25016538
- ChemSpider: 34980944
- UNII: YK98JFQ52U
- CompTox Dashboard (EPA): DTXSID801030323

Chemical and physical data
- Formula: C_{12}H_{17}N_{3}O
- Molar mass: 219.288 g·mol^{−1}
- 3D model (JSmol): Interactive image
- SMILES: NC1=N[C@@H](CN(C2=CC=CC=C2)CC)CO1
- InChI: InChI=1S/C12H17N3O/c1-2-15(11-6-4-3-5-7-11)8-10-9-16-12(13)14-10/h3-7,10H,2,8-9H2,1H3,(H2,13,14)/t10-/m0/s1; Key:PPONHQQJLWPUPH-JTQLQIEISA-N

RO5166017, or RO-5166017, is a drug developed by Hoffmann-La Roche which acts as a potent and selective agonist for the trace amine-associated receptor 1 (TAAR1), with no significant activity at other targets. It is a partial agonist or near-full agonist depending on the species.

The drug is important for the study of the TAAR1 receptor, as while numerous other compounds are known which act as TAAR1 agonists, such as methamphetamine, MDMA, and 3-iodothyronamine, all previously known TAAR1 agonists are either weak and rapidly metabolized (endogenous ligands), or have strong pharmacological activity at other targets (amphetamines, thyronamines), making it very difficult to assess which effects are due to TAAR1 activation. The discovery of RO-5166017 allows purely TAAR1 mediated effects to be studied.

== Pharmacology ==
=== Pharmacodynamics ===
==== Actions ====
RO5166017 is a partial agonist or near-full agonist of the TAAR1 depending on the species examined. Its EC_{50} values are 3.3 to 8.0 nM for the mouse TAAR1 (mTAAR1), 14 nM for the rat TAAR1 (rTAAR1), 97 nM for the cynomolgus monkey TAAR1, and 55 nM for the human TAAR1. Its E_{max} values are 65 to 72% for the mTAAR1, 90% for the rTAAR1, 81% for the cynomolgus monkey TAAR1, and 95% for the hTAAR1. RO5166017 is selective for the TAAR1 over a large array of other targets.

RO5166017 at TAAR1 in different species
Species	Affinity (K_{i}, nM)	EC_{50} (nM)	E_{max} (%)
Mouse	1.9	3.3–8.0	65–72%
Rat	2.7	14	90%
Monkey	24	97	81%
Human	31	55	95%

==== Effects ====
RO5166017 has been found to inhibit the firing rates of ventral tegmental area (VTA) dopaminergic neurons and dorsal raphe nucleus (DRN) serotonergic neurons in mouse brain slices ex vivo. Conversely, it had no effect on the firing rates of locus coeruleus (LC) noradrenergic neurons, an area where TAAR1 has relatively low expression. The effects of RO5166017 on monoaminergic neuron firing frequencies were absent in TAAR1 knockout mice and could be reversed by the TAAR1 antagonist RTI-7470-44, indicating that they were mediated by TAAR1 activation. Similar effects have been observed with the TAAR1 full agonist p-tyramine. Likewise, RO5166017 inhibited electrically evoked dopamine release in dorsal striatum (DStr) and nucleus accumbens (NAc) mouse brain slices ex vivo. Inhibition of NAc dopamine overflow by RO5166017 could be reversed by the TAAR1 antagonist EPPTB. Neither RO5166017 nor EPPTB had any effect on measures of dopamine reuptake or clearance (tau and half-life) in dopaminergic brain slices ex vivo.

Previous in-vitro studies found that TAAR1 could activate several signaling cascades including PKA, PKC, ERK1/2, and CREB. However, RO5166017 did not affect these signaling pathways, nor GSK3β, in rats in vivo, and instead selectively and TAAR1-dependently inhibited CaMKIIα activity in the NAc.

In animal studies, RO5166017 has little or no effect on locomotor activity itself. In contrast to psychostimulants like amphetamine and cocaine, it does not show stimulant-like or rewarding effects across a broad dose range. The drug dose-dependently suppresses cocaine-induced hyperlocomotion and stereotypies. Likewise, it suppresses hyperlocomotion induced by the NMDA receptor antagonist L-687,414. In dopamine transporter (DAT) knockout mice, which show spontaneous hyperactivity in novel environments, RO5166017 suppresses hyperlocomotion. These effects of RO5166017 are similar to those of antipsychotics like haloperidol and olanzapine. They are absent in TAAR1 knockout mice, indicating that they are mediated by the TAAR1. These findings indicate that RO5166017 has antipsychotic-like effects.

RO5166017 has been found to inhibit expression, though not reconsolidation or retention, of cocaine-induced conditioned place preference (CPP) in mice. Systemic administration or microinjection of RO5166017 into various brain regions has been found to inhibit other cocaine-induced relapse-like behaviors in rodents as well. As with cocaine, RO5166017 has been found to inhibit nicotine-induced dopamine release in the NAc and to reduce nicotine intake and relapse-like behaviors.

RO5166017 has been shown shown to prevent stress-induced hyperthermia in rodents. It has shown robust aversive effects in rodents, similarly to other TAAR1 agonists like RO5256390 and RO5263397. RO5166017 has shown anxiolytic-like effects in mice. It has been found to produce anti-impulsivity-like effects in mice. The drug has been found to augment 6-hydroxydopamine (6-OHDA)-induced dopaminergic neurodegeneration in mice and to counteract levodopa-induced contralateral rotations and dyskinesia. RO5166017 has shown anti-post-traumatic stress disorder (PTSD)-like effects in rodents.

=== Pharmacokinetics ===
RO5166017 has shown favorable pharmacokinetic properties for in vivo use.

== History ==
RO5166017 was first described in the scientific literature by 2011. It was the first selective TAAR1 agonist to be discovered.

== See also ==
- RO5073012 – TAAR1 weak partial agonist
- RO5203648 – TAAR1 partial agonist
- RO5256390 – TAAR1 partial or full agonist
- RO5263397 – TAAR1 partial agonist
- EPPTB – TAAR1 antagonist/inverse agonist
- o-Phenyl-3-iodotyramine
- List of aminorex analogues
