= O-Phenyl-3-iodotyramine =

Chemical compound

o-Phenyl-3-iodotyramine
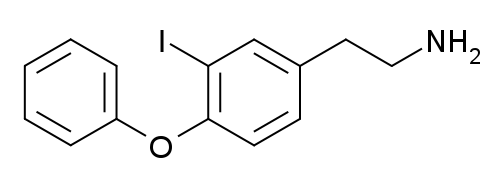

Clinical data
- Other names: o-PIT; o-Phenyl-iodotyramine; o-Phenyliodotyramine
- Drug class: Trace amine-associated receptor 1 (TAAR1) agonist

Identifiers
- IUPAC name: 2-(3-Iodo-4-phenoxyphenyl)ethanamine
- CAS Number: 794507-61-2
- PubChem CID: 11501691
- ChemSpider: 9676493
- UNII: H3WFC2TGK2
- CompTox Dashboard (EPA): DTXSID401030333

Chemical and physical data
- Formula: C_{14}H_{14}INO
- Molar mass: 339.176 g·mol^{−1}
- 3D model (JSmol): Interactive image
- SMILES: Ic1cc(CCN)ccc1Oc2ccccc2
- InChI: InChI=1S/C14H14INO/c15-13-10-11(8-9-16)6-7-14(13)17-12-4-2-1-3-5-12/h1-7,10H,8-9,16H2

o-Phenyl-3-iodotyramine (o-PIT) is a drug which acts as a selective agonist for the trace amine-associated receptor 1 (TAAR1). It has reasonable selectivity for TAAR1 but relatively low potency, and is rapidly metabolised in vivo, making it less useful for research than newer ligands such as RO5166017. Its EC_{50} values have been reported to be 35 nM for the mouse TAAR1, 2.4 nM at the rat TAAR1, and 9.5 nM at the human TAAR1.

o-PIT has been found to produce effects in animals including hypothermia, hypolocomotion, antidepressant-like effects, anxiolytic-like effects, anti-obsessional-like effects, and antipsychotic-like effects, and inhibition of prepulse inhibition (PPI). These actions may be partially to fully dependent on TAAR1 agonism depending on the effect in question.

TAAR1 agonism has been implicated in modulating the effects of monoamine releasing agents (MRAs) like amphetamines. The MRA 3,4-methylenedioxymethamphetamine (MDMA) is a potent agonist of the mouse TAAR1, whereas the MRA para-chloroamphetamine (PCA) is not a significant agonist of the human TAAR1 or presumably of the mouse TAAR1. MDMA-induced in-vivo brain serotonin and dopamine release and hyperlocomotion are augmented in TAAR1 knockout mice relative to normal mice, whereas the in-vivo brain serotonin and dopamine release of PCA are not different between normal mice and TAAR1 knockout mice. In the same study, o-PIT blunted the dopamine and serotonin release of PCA in mouse synaptosomes in vitro, an effect that was absent in synaptosomes from TAAR1 knockout mice. These findings led to conclusions that TAAR1 agonism by MDMA auto-inhibits and constrains its own effects in rodents. Although MDMA is a potent TAAR1 agonist in rodents, it is a very weak and non-significant TAAR1 agonist in humans.
