= SB-221284 =

Clinical data
- Other names: SB221284
- Drug class: Serotonin 5-HT_{2C} receptor antagonist; Serotonin 5-HT_{2B} receptor antagonist

Identifiers
- IUPAC name: 5-methylsulfanyl-N-pyridin-3-yl-6-(trifluoromethyl)-2,3-dihydroindole-1-carboxamide
- CAS Number: 196965-14-7
- PubChem CID: 443389
- IUPHAR/BPS: 191
- ChemSpider: 391618
- KEGG: C11741
- ChEBI: CHEBI:8978
- ChEMBL: ChEMBL276140
- CompTox Dashboard (EPA): DTXSID50332080

Chemical and physical data
- Formula: C_{16}H_{14}F_{3}N_{3}OS
- Molar mass: 353.36 g·mol^{−1}
- 3D model (JSmol): Interactive image
- SMILES: CSC1=C(C=C2C(=C1)CCN2C(=O)NC3=CN=CC=C3)C(F)(F)F
- InChI: InChI=1S/C16H14F3N3OS/c1-24-14-7-10-4-6-22(13(10)8-12(14)16(17,18)19)15(23)21-11-3-2-5-20-9-11/h2-3,5,7-9H,4,6H2,1H3,(H,21,23); Key:OQZOXHCRSXYSPM-UHFFFAOYSA-N

SB-221284 is a selective serotonin 5-HT_{2C} and 5-HT_{2B} receptor antagonist which is used in scientific research.

Its affinities (K_{i}) are 2.2 to 2.5 nM for the serotonin 5-HT_{2C} receptor, 2.5 to 12.6 nM for the serotonin 5-HT_{2B} receptor, and 398 to 550 nM for the serotonin 5-HT_{2A} receptor (where it is also an antagonist). The drug has 160- to 250-fold selectivity for the serotonin 5-HT_{2C} receptor over the serotonin 5-HT_{2A} receptor. It is said to have been the first serotonin 5-HT_{2C} receptor ligand to show 100-fold selectivity over the serotonin 5-HT_{2A} receptor.

SB-221284 has shown anxiolytic-like effects in animals. Conversely, it has been said to be inactive in terms of antidepressant-like, antiobsessional-like, antipanic-like, and sedative effects. It also showed no proconvulsant or hyperphagic effects in animals, phenotypes that are notably observed with serotonin 5-HT_{2C} receptor knockout.

The preferential serotonin 5-HT_{2C} receptor agonist meta-chlorophenylpiperazine (mCPP) and the serotonin reuptake inhibitor fluoxetine have been found to acutely reduce social interaction in rodents. SB-221284 was found to reverse the acute decreases in social interaction produced by mCPP and fluoxetine. The drug has also been found to block mCPP-induced hypolocomotion. Both SB-221284 and the selective serotonin 5-HT_{2C} receptor antagonist SB-242084 have been found to enhance the nucleus accumbens dopamine release and hyperlocomotion induced by NMDA receptor antagonists like phencyclidine (PCP) and dizocilpine (MK-801). Conversely, both drugs had no effect on locomotor activity or dopamine release in the nucleus accumbens by themselves. However, another study reported that SB-221284 by itself did enhance locomotion.

SB-221284 was first described in the scientific literature by 1996. It was researched by GlaxoSmithKline as a possible non-sedating anxiolytic and reached the preclinical research stage of development. However, it was found to be a potent inhibitor of a number of human cytochrome P450 enzymes (particularly CYP1A2), which precluded further development of the drug. Other sources have stated that SB-221284 was not further developed due to "toxicity" and that other drugs were pursued instead as SB-221284 was a "fairly weak" serotonin 5-HT_{2C} receptor antagonist.
