= ACSF =

ACSF may refer to:

- All-China Sports Federation
- American Clean Skies Foundation
- Artificial cerebrospinal fluid
- Atkinson Center for a Sustainable Future
