= C11H11Cl2N3O =

The molecular formula C_{11}H_{11}Cl_{2}N_{3}O (molar mass: 272.131 g/mol, exact mass: 271.0279 u) may refer to:

- Muzolimine
- WAY-161503
