= RO5073012 =

Clinical data
- Other names: Ro-5073012
- Drug class: Trace amine-associated receptor 1 (TAAR1) partial agonist

Identifiers
- IUPAC name: 4-chloro-N-(1H-imidazol-5-ylmethyl)-N-propan-2-ylaniline
- CAS Number: 1020814-70-3
- PubChem CID: 24947142
- ChemSpider: 28649830
- ChEMBL: ChEMBL2206375

Chemical and physical data
- Formula: C_{13}H_{16}ClN_{3}
- Molar mass: 249.74 g·mol^{−1}
- 3D model (JSmol): Interactive image
- SMILES: CC(C)N(CC1=CN=CN1)C2=CC=C(C=C2)Cl
- InChI: InChI=1S/C13H16ClN3/c1-10(2)17(8-12-7-15-9-16-12)13-5-3-11(14)4-6-13/h3-7,9-10H,8H2,1-2H3,(H,15,16); Key:AOHLEOYTKMSKPD-UHFFFAOYSA-N

RO5073012 is a selective low-efficacy partial agonist of the trace amine-associated receptor 1 (TAAR1) which has been used in scientific research. TAAR1 partial agonists like RO5073012 can have agonist- or antagonist-like effects at the TAAR1 depending on the context and level of TAAR1 signaling.

== Pharmacology ==
=== Pharmacodynamics ===
==== Actions ====
RO5073012 has high affinity for the mouse, rat, cynomolgus monkey, and human TAAR1 (K_{i} = 0.5–6 nM), is highly potent and selective as an agonist of the TAAR1 of these species (EC_{50} = 8.8–25 nM), and has relatively low intrinsic activity at the TAAR1 of these species (E_{max} = 24–43% relative to β-phenethylamine).

RO5073012 at TAAR1 in different species
Species	Affinity (K_{i}, nM)	EC_{50} (nM)	E_{max} (%)
Mouse	3.2	23	26%
Rat	1.1	25	24%
Monkey	0.5	8.8	43%
Human	5.8–6	23–25	34–35%

==== Effects ====
RO5073012 by itself has no effect on locomotor activity in normal mice. It dose-dependently suppresses cocaine-induced hyperlocomotion (a psychostimulant-like effect) in rats, with near-complete suppression of cocaine-induced locomotor stimulation at the highest dose of RO5073012. Other TAAR1 agonists, including both partial agonists and full agonists, likewise suppress psychostimulant-induced hyperlocomotion. Conversely however, and in contrast to other TAAR1 partial agonists, RO5073012 non-significantly reduced the locomotor activity induced by amphetamine in normal mice. The reasons for this difference from other TAAR1 partial agonists are unclear, though RO5073012 has notably lower TAAR1 efficacy than other TAAR1 partial agonists. RO5073012 reduces basal locomotor activity in transgenic mice with TAAR1 overexpression. Amphetamine produces only weak locomotor stimulation in mice with TAAR1 overexpression, and RO5073012, by antagonizing the TAAR1, has been found to restore dextroamphetamine-induced hyperlocomotion in this context.

=== Pharmacokinetics ===
The drug has favorable physicochemical and pharmacokinetic properties for use in vivo.

== History ==
RO5073012 was first described in the scientific literature by 2012. It has been relatively little-studied compared to other TAAR1 partial agonists, for instance RO5166017, RO5203648, and RO5263397.

== See also ==
- RO5166017 – TAAR1 partial or full agonist
- RO5203648 – TAAR1 partial agonist
- RO5256390 – TAAR1 partial or full agonist
- RO5263397 – TAAR1 partial agonist
- EPPTB – TAAR1 antagonist/inverse agonist
