= RTI-7470-44 =

Potent human TAAR1 antagonist

Clinical data
- Drug class: Trace amine-associated receptor 1 (TAAR1) antagonist

Identifiers
- IUPAC name: 2-[6-(4-chlorophenyl)-3-cyano-4-(trifluoromethyl)pyridin-2-yl]sulfanyl-N-pyrimidin-2-ylacetamide
- CAS Number: 825658-63-7
- PubChem CID: 2225078
- ChemSpider: 1663640

Chemical and physical data
- Formula: C_{19}H_{11}ClF_{3}N_{5}OS
- Molar mass: 449.84 g·mol^{−1}
- 3D model (JSmol): Interactive image
- SMILES: C1=CN=C(N=C1)NC(=O)CSC2=C(C(=CC(=N2)C3=CC=C(C=C3)Cl)C(F)(F)F)C#N
- InChI: InChI=1S/C19H11ClF3N5OS/c20-12-4-2-11(3-5-12)15-8-14(19(21,22)23)13(9-24)17(27-15)30-10-16(29)28-18-25-6-1-7-26-18/h1-8H,10H2,(H,25,26,28,29); Key:WHNQNKYKDSLDKM-UHFFFAOYSA-N

RTI-7470-44 is a potent and selective antagonist of the human trace amine-associated receptor 1 (TAAR1) which is used in scientific research. It was discovered in 2022 and is the first potent antagonist of the human TAAR1 to be identified, following the potent mouse TAAR1 inverse agonist EPPTB in 2009.

== Pharmacology ==
The affinity (K_{i}) of RTI-7470-44 for the human TAAR1 is 0.3 nM and its inhibitory potency (IC_{50}) at the receptor is 8.4 nM in vitro. It is about 90-fold less potent at the rat TAAR1 (IC_{50} = 748 nM) and 140-fold less potent at the mouse TAAR1 (IC_{50} = 1,190 nM) compared to the human TAAR1. Surprisingly, RTI-7470-44 was found to be a competitive antagonist of the human and mouse TAAR1 but a non-competitive antagonist of the rat TAAR1.

RTI-7470-44 at TAAR1 in different species
Species	Affinity (K_{i}, nM)	IC_{50} (nM)	I_{max} (%)
Mouse	139	1,190	ND
Rat	ND	748	ND
Human	0.3	8.4	101%

The compound has favorable in vivo drug-like properties, including good blood–brain barrier permeability, moderate metabolic stability, and a favorable preliminary profile of off-target activity (≥1–10 μM at 42 other targets). It is far more potent (893-fold) as an antagonist of the human TAAR1 than the earlier TAAR1 inverse agonist EPPTB in vitro, which has dramatically lower potency (165–272-fold) at the human TAAR1 and rat TAAR1 compared to the mouse TAAR1.

RTI-7470-44 has been found to increase the spontaneous firing rate of dopaminergic neurons in mouse ventral tegmental area (VTA) slices ex vivo and to block the effects of the high-efficacy TAAR1 partial agonist RO5166017 in this system.

== History ==
RTI-7470-44 was first described in the scientific literature in 2022. It was identified via high throughput screening followed by structure–activity optimization.

== See also ==
- EPPTB – mouse TAAR1 antagonist or inverse agonist
