= Carbogen =

Mixture of carbon dioxide and oxygen

Carbogen, also called Meduna's Mixture after its inventor Ladislas Meduna, is a mixture of carbon dioxide (CO_{2}) and oxygen (O_{2}) gas. Meduna's original formula was 70% O_{2} and 30% CO_{2}, but the term carbogen can refer to any mixture of these two gases, from 1.5% to 50% CO_{2}. For comparison, normal air contains approximately 21% O_{2} and 0.04% CO_{2}. Inhalation of carbogen produces hallucinogenic effects.

== Mechanism ==
When carbogen is inhaled, the increased level of carbon dioxide causes a perception, both psychological and physiological, of suffocation because the brain interprets an increase in blood carbon dioxide as a decrease in oxygen level, which would generally be the case under natural circumstances. Inhalation of carbogen causes the body to react as if it were not receiving sufficient oxygen: breathing quickens and deepens, heart rate increases, and cells release alkaline buffering agents to remove carbonic acid from the bloodstream.

== Psychotherapy ==
Carbogen was once used in psychology and psychedelic psychotherapy to determine whether a patient would react to an altered state of consciousness or to a sensation of loss of control. Individuals who reacted especially negatively to carbogen were generally not administered other psychotherapeutic drugs for fear of similar reactions. Meduna administered carbogen to his patients to induce abreaction, which, with proper preparation and administration, he found could help clients become free of their neuroses. Carbogen users are said to have discovered unconscious contents of their minds, with the experience clearing away repressed material and freeing the subject for a smoother, more profound psychedelic experience.

One subject reported: "After the second breath came an onrush of color, first a predominant sheet of beautiful rosy-red, following which came successive sheets of brilliant color and design, some geometric, some fanciful and graceful …. Then the colors separated; my soul drawing apart from the physical being, was drawn upward seemingly to leave the earth and to go upward where it reached a greater Spirit with Whom there was a communion, producing a remarkable, new relaxation and deep security."

Carbogen is rarely used in therapy anymore, largely due to the decline in psychedelic psychotherapy.

== Uses ==
A carbogen mixture of 95% oxygen and 5% carbon dioxide can be used as part of the early treatment of central retinal artery occlusion. On this same premise it has also been proposed to be used in the management of sudden sensorineural hearing loss which can increase the blood flow to the inner ear and also possibly relieve the internal auditory artery spasm.

Carbogen is used in biology research to study in vivo oxygen and carbon dioxide flows, as well as to oxygenate the aCSF solution and stabilize the pH to about 7.4 in research on acute brain slices.

Its use with nicotinamide is also being investigated in conjunction with radiation therapy in the treatment strategy of certain cancers. Because increased tumor oxygenation improves the cell-killing effects of radiation, it is thought that the inhalation of these agents during radiation therapy could increase its effectiveness.

== See also ==
- Holotropic breathwork
- Hydrogen narcosis
- Nitrogen narcosis
