= Locomotor activity =

Behavioral measure in animals

Locomotor activity is a measure of animal behavior which is employed in scientific research.

Hyperlocomotion, also known as locomotor hyperactivity, hyperactivity, or increased locomotor activity, is an effect of certain drugs in animals in which locomotor activity (locomotion) is increased. It is induced by certain drugs like psychostimulants and NMDA receptor antagonists and is reversed by certain other drugs like antipsychotics and certain antidepressants. Stimulation of locomotor activity is thought to be mediated by increased signaling in the nucleus accumbens, a major brain area involved in behavioral activation and motivated behavior.

Hypolocomotion, also known as locomotor hypoactivity, hypoactivity, and decreased locomotor activity, is an effect of certain drugs in animals in which locomotor activity is decreased. It is a characteristic effect of many sedative agents and general anesthetics. Antipsychotics, which are dopamine receptor antagonists, and many serotonergic agents, such as meta-chlorophenylpiperazine (mCPP), can also produce this effect, often as a side effect.

Although locomotor activity is mainly an animal behavior test, it has also been evaluated in humans. People with attention deficit hyperactivity disorder (ADHD), in the manic phase of bipolar disorder, on acute amphetamine, and with schizophrenia show increased locomotor activity, while children with autism show decreased locomotor activity. Conversely, reduced locomotor activity is observed in bipolar individuals on mood stabilizers and may be a characteristic symptom of the inattentive type of ADHD (ADHD-PI) and sluggish cognitive tempo.

== Drugs affecting locomotor activity ==
=== Dopaminergic agents ===
==== Dopamine releasing agents ====
Hyperlocomotion is induced by dopamine releasing agents (DRAs) and psychostimulants like amphetamine and methamphetamine. These drugs likewise induce stereotypies.

==== Dopamine reuptake inhibitors ====
The dopamine reuptake inhibitors (DRIs) amineptine, bupropion, and nomifensine increase spontaneous locomotor activity in animals. The DRI cocaine increases locomotor activity similarly to the preceding DRIs and to amphetamines. The atypical DRI modafinil does not produce hyperlocomotion in animals.

==== Dopamine receptor agonists ====
Direct dopamine receptor agonists like apomorphine show biphasic effects, decreasing locomotor activity at low doses and increasing locomotor activity at high doses.

==== Dopamine receptor antagonists ====
Drug-induced hyperlocomotion can be reversed by various drugs, such as antipsychotics acting as dopamine D_{2} receptor antagonists. Reversal of drug-induced hyperlocomotion has been used as an animal test of drug antipsychotic-like activity. Reversal of amphetamine- and NMDA receptor antagonist-induced stereotypies is also employed as a test of drug antipsychotic-like activity.

=== Adrenergic agents ===
==== Norepinephrine releasing agents ====
Selective norepinephrine releasing agents (NRAs) include ephedrine, pseudoephedrine, phenylpropanolamine, levomethamphetamine, and D-phenylalaninol. However, these drugs also release dopamine to a much lesser extent (e.g., ~10-fold less potently).

Ephedrine consistently stimulates locomotor activity in rodents. However, the hyperlocomotion induced by ephedrine may be mediated by dopamine release rather than by norepinephrine release. On the other hand, lesioning the brain noradrenergic system with the noradrenergic neurotoxin DSP-4 reduces dextroamphetamine-induced hyperlocomotion. In addition, the selective α_{1}-adrenergic receptor antagonist prazosin antagonizes amphetamine-induced hyperlocomotion and knockout of the α_{1B}-adrenergic receptor dramatically reduces dextroamphetamine-induced hyperlocomotion. In contrast to ephedrine and amphetamine, pseudoephedrine and phenylpropanolamine do not stimulate locomotor activity in rodents. However, in another study, pseudoephedrine was able to increase locomotor activity. A potential confounding factor with β-hydroxyamphetamines like phenylpropanolamine, ephedrine, and pseudoephedrine is that they have lower lipophilicity compared to their amphetamine counterparts, with consequent reduced capacity to cross the blood–brain barrier and produce central nervous system effects.

Conversely, the potencies of monoamine releasing agents (MRAs) in producing amphetamine-type subjective effects in humans have been found to correlate with their potency to induce norepinephrine release and not with their potencies to induce dopamine release. In addition, self-administration of methamphetamine appeared to be relatively resistant to blockade by dopamine receptor antagonists. Findings on the modulation of the ventral tegmental area by the noradrenergic locus coeruleus are mixed and suggestive of both excitatory and inhibitory roles. The α_{1}-adrenergic receptor appears to be facilitatory, whereas the α_{2}-adrenergic receptor appears to be inhibitory, and the β-adrenergic receptors appear to not be involved. More research is needed to investigate the role of norepinephrine in dopamine modulation and stimulant-like effects.

In contrast to normal mice, psychostimulants like amphetamine, β-phenethylamine, and methylphenidate lose their ability to elevate brain dopamine but not norepinephrine in dopamine transporter (DAT) knockout mice and have been found to decrease locomotor activity in these mice. Paradoxically however, cocaine retains reinforcing effects in DAT knockout mice and cocaine and amphetamine are still able to elevate dopamine in the medial nucleus accumbens in these mice. It was found that the norepinephrine reuptake inhibitor reboxetine increases dopamine levels in the nucleus accumbens in DAT knockout mice but not in normal mice, suggesting that the effects of norepinephrine elevation change in the brains of DAT knockout mice.

Whereas dextromethamphetamine is a well-balanced norepinephrine–dopamine releasing agent (NDRA), levomethamphetamine is a selective NRA. Levomethamphetamine has similar potency as an NRA compared to dextromethamphetamine. Conversely, levomethamphetamine is about 15- to 20-fold less potent in inducing dopamine release than dextromethamphetamine. In accordance with the preceding, levomethamphetamine was found to selectively induce brain norepinephrine release with minimal effect on brain dopamine release across an assessed dosage range in rodents. The drug did not increase locomotor activity at the assessed doses, in which brain dopamine release was not affected. In contrast to levomethamphetamine, dextromethamphetamine at the same doses increased brain levels of both norepinephrine and dopamine and induced dose-dependent hyperlocomotion. Relatedly, levomethamphetamine shows similar sympathomimetic effects as dextromethamphetamine but is substantially less potent as a psychostimulant in animals. As in rodents, levomethamphetamine showed reduced reinforcing and stimulant-like effects compared to dextromethamphetamine in rhesus monkeys.

Animal studies of the reinforcing and cocaine-like effects of dopamine releasing agents (DRAs) with varying capacities to release norepinephrine and serotonin in rodents and monkeys have suggested that in contrast to the case of serotonin release, which inhibits the reinforcing and stimulant-like effects of these agents, norepinephrine release has minimal influence on their misuse liability and associated effects.

==== Norepinephrine reuptake inhibitors ====
Norepinephrine reuptake inhibitors (NRIs), like atomoxetine, reboxetine, and desipramine, do not increase locomotor activity in rodents and instead show no effect on locomotor activity or decrease it. In addition, NRIs decrease amphetamine-, cocaine-, methylphenidate-, and phencyclidine (PCP)-induced hyperlocomotion in rodents. Accordingly, atomoxetine has been reported to attenuate the stimulant and rewarding effects of dextroamphetamine in humans.

A variety of different NRIs were shown to decrease spontaneous locomotor activity in a novel environment when given acutely and to decrease locomotor activity in both novel and familiar environments when given chronically in rodents. Similarly, norepinephrine transporter (NET) knockout mice had low basal locomotor activity. However, combination of an NRI with dopamine reuptake inhibition resulted in increased locomotor activity. It was concluded that norepinephrine reuptake inhibition by itself decreases locomotor activity unless it is combined with dopamine reuptake inhibition.

=== Serotonergic agents ===
==== Serotonin releasing agents ====
Certain serotonin releasing agents (SRAs), like MDMA and MDAI, though notably not others, like chlorphentermine, fenfluramine, and MMAI, induce locomotor hyperactivity in animals. This is dependent on serotonin release allowed for by the serotonin transporter (SERT) and serotonin 5-HT_{2B} receptor. SERT knockout, pretreatment with serotonin reuptake inhibitors (SRIs) (which block MDMA-induced SERT-mediated serotonin release), or serotonin 5-HT_{2B} receptor knockout (which likewise blocks MDMA-induced serotonin release), all completely block MDMA-induced locomotor hyperactivity. In addition, locomotor hyperactivity produced by MDMA is partially attenuated by serotonin 5-HT_{1B} receptor antagonism (or knockout) or by serotonin 5-HT_{2A} receptor antagonism. The locomotor hyperactivity produced by MDMA is fully attenuated by combined serotonin 5-HT_{1B} and 5-HT_{2A} receptor antagonism. Conversely, the serotonin 5-HT_{1A} receptor is not involved in MDMA-induced hyperlocomotion. Serotonin 5-HT_{2C} receptor activation appears to inhibit MDMA-induced hyperlocomotion, and antagonism of this receptor has been reported to markedly enhance the locomotor hyperactivity induced by MDMA. Activation of the serotonin 5-HT_{2C} receptor is known to inhibit dopamine release in the mesolimbic pathway as well as to inhibit dopamine release in the nigrostriatal and mesocortical pathways.

Although the serotonin system has been implicated in the hyperlocomotion of SRAs, certain SRAs, such as MDMA, are actually serotonin–norepinephrine–dopamine releasing agents (SNDRAs), and catecholaminergic mechanisms are likely to additionally be involved. Relatedly, the α_{1}-adrenergic receptor antagonist prazosin completely blocks MDMA-induced hyperlocomotion in animals. In addition, the α_{1}-adrenergic receptor antagonists prazosin and doxazosin reduce the psychostimulant and/or euphoric effects of MDMA in humans. Similarly, the norepinephrine reuptake inhibitor (NRI) reboxetine, which prevents MDMA from inducing norepinephrine release, likewise reduces the stimulant effects and emotional excitation of MDMA in humans. Dopamine receptors also appear to be involved in MDMA-induced hyperlocomotion, although findings in this area, both in animals and humans, seem to be conflicting.

In contrast to non-selective SRAs like MDMA, the highly selective SRA MMAI induces hypolocomotion in animals. Similarly, the highly selective SRA chlorphentermine is said to weakly stimulate locomotor activity at low doses and to progressively suppress locomotor activity at higher doses.

The reasons for the differences in locomotor activity with different SRAs are not fully clear. In any case, they may be related to factors such as whether the agents are selective SRAs, whether they additionally act as agonists of serotonin 5-HT_{2} receptors, and whether they additionally induce the release of norepinephrine and/or dopamine.

==== Serotonin reuptake inhibitors ====
Selective serotonin reuptake inhibitors (SSRIs) have been reported to have no effect or to increase locomotor activity, at least under certain circumstances like novel environments. However, in other studies, SSRIs have been reported to produce hypolocomotion, an effect that could be reversed by the serotonin 5-HT_{2C} receptor antagonist SB-242084. In another study, the SSRIs fluoxetine and citalopram had no effect on locomotor activity alone or in combination with SB-242084.

Fluoxetine has been found to not affect dextroamphetamine-induced hyperlocomotion. Similarly, sertraline did not affect cocaine-induced hyperlocomotion.

==== Serotonin precursors ====
The serotonin precursor 5-hydroxytryptophan (5-HTP) combined with benserazide can suppress the hyperlocomotion induced by dextroamphetamine in rodents.

==== Serotonin receptor agonists ====
The non-selective serotonin receptor agonists and serotonergic psychedelics LSD and DOI decrease locomotor activity in animals. However, whereas LSD suppresses locomotion at all doses tested, DOI as well as DOM show an inverted U-shaped dose–response curve, with stimulation of locomotor activity at low doses and suppression of locomotion at higher doses. The hyperlocomotion of DOI at low doses is abolished in serotonin 5-HT_{2A} receptor knockout mice, whereas the hypolocomotion with DOI at higher doses is blocked by the selective serotonin 5-HT_{2C} receptor antagonist SER-082. Similarly, the hyperlocomotion of low doses of DOM is reduced by the serotonin 5-HT_{2A} receptor antagonist volinanserin (MDL-100907) and enhanced by the serotonin 5-HT_{2C} receptor antagonist SB-242084 and its hypolocomotion at high doses is attenuated by SB-242084. As such, it has been concluded that serotonin 5-HT_{2A} receptor activation increases locomotor activity while serotonin 5-HT_{2C} receptor agonism decreases locomotor activity.

The locomotor effects of many other serotonergic psychedelics have also been studied and have often been similar to the preceding agents. However, in other cases, they have been different. The tryptamine psychedelics psilocin and 5-MeO-DMT produce profound hypolocomotion in mice and this is blocked by the serotonin 5-HT_{1A} receptor antagonist WAY-100635 or by serotonin 5-HT_{1A} receptor knockout but not by the serotonin 5-HT_{2C} receptor antagonist SB-242084. 5-MeO-DALT dose-dependently increased locomotor activity but produced a sharp decrease at the highest tested dose. The relatively selective serotonin 5-HT_{2A} receptor agonist 25I-NBOMe has been found to show similar locomotor effects to phenylalkylamine psychedelics, increasing locomotor activity at low doses at decreasing it at higher doses. The selective serotonin 5-HT_{2A} receptor agonist 25CN-NBOH modestly increased locomotor activity or did not affect it.

The non-selective serotonin 5-HT_{2C} receptor agonists meta-chlorophenylpiperazine (mCPP) and Ro60-0175 as well as the selective serotonin 5-HT_{2C} receptor agonists WAY-161503 and CP-809101 produce hypolocomotion in rodents. In serotonin 5-HT_{2C} receptor knockout mice, on the other hand, mCPP produced hyperlocomotion. In contrast to most serotonin 5-HT_{2C} receptor agonists, the selective serotonin 5-HT_{2C} receptor agonist WAY-163909 had no effect on spontaneous locomotor activity. The selective serotonin 5-HT_{2C} receptor agonists WAY-163909 and CP-809101 have been found to suppress dextroamphetamine-induced hyperlocomotion. The non-selective serotonin 5-HT_{2C} receptor agonist Ro60-0175 has been found to suppress the hyperlocomotion induced by cocaine, and this effect could be blocked by the selective serotonin 5-HT_{2C} receptor antagonist SB-242084. CP-809101 has been found to decrease locomotor activity and antagonized phencyclidine (PCP)-induced hyperlocomotion.

==== Serotonin receptor antagonists ====
Serotonin 5-HT_{2A} receptor antagonists like volinanserin (MDL-100907) and ketanserin counteract the hyperactivity induced by amphetamine, cocaine, and NMDA receptor antagonists like PCP in animals. Less-selective serotonin 5-HT_{2A} receptor antagonists, like trazodone, have been found to decrease locomotor and behavioral activity and to inhibit amphetamine-, cocaine-, and PCP-induced hyperactivity in animals similarly. Blockade of the serotonin 5-HT_{2A} receptor by atypical antipsychotics like clozapine and olanzapine contributes to the hypolocomotion they produce. In addition to serotonin 5-HT_{2A} receptor antagonists, serotonin 5-HT_{2A} receptor biased agonists that selectively activate the β-arrestin pathway but not the G_{q} pathway, like 25N-N1-Nap, have been found to antagonize PCP-induced locomotor hyperactivity in rodents.

Serotonin 5-HT_{2B} receptor antagonists by themselves do not appear to affect locomotor activity. However, antagonists of the serotonin 5-HT_{2B} receptor decrease the locomotor hyperactivity of amphetamine, cocaine, and phencyclidine (PCP).

The selective serotonin 5-HT_{2C} receptor antagonist SB-242084 has been found to produce modest hyperlocomotion at high doses in rodents. The drug has also been found to produce modest stimulant-like effects in squirrel monkeys. SB-242084 has additionally been found to enhance the hyperlocomotion of dextroamphetamine in rodents. Similarly, it has been found to dose-dependently enhance the hyperlocomotion induced by dexfenfluramine in rodents. It has also been found to enhance the hyperlocomotion induced by MDMA, fenfluramine, cocaine, and methylphenidate, to modestly enhance nicotine- and morphine-induced hyperactivity, and to not affect the hyperactivity induced by RU-24969 or citalopram. The serotonin 5-HT_{2C} receptor antagonist SB-221284 has been found to augment the nucleus accumbens dopamine elevations and hyperlocomotion induced by NMDA receptor antagonists like phencyclidine (PCP) and dizocilpine (MK-801) in rodents.

=== Glutamatergic agents ===
==== NMDA receptor antagonists ====
Hyperlocomotion is induced by NMDA receptor antagonists and dissociative hallucinogens such as phencyclidine (PCP), ketamine, and dizocilpine (MK-801). These drugs likewise induce stereotypies.

=== Cholinergic agents ===
==== Muscarinic acetylcholine receptor antagonists ====
Non-selective muscarinic acetylcholine receptor antagonists, or antimuscarinics, such as atropine, hyoscyamine, and scopolamine, produce robust hyperactivity in animals, but also produce deliriant effects such as amnesia and hallucinations in both animals and humans.

=== Cannabinoids ===
Tetrahydrocannabinol (THC) produces hypolocomotion in rodents. Cannabidiol (CBD) does not appear to affect locomotor activity when administered by itself or when added to THC. However, in some studies, CBD augmented THC-induced hypolocomotion.

=== Opioids ===
Classical opioids or μ-opioid receptor agonists like morphine and fentanyl stimulate locomotor activity in rodents. However, high doses of μ-opioid receptor agonists induce locomotor depression. δ-Opioid receptor agonists like AZD-2327 likewise stimulate locomotor activity in rodents.

=== TAAR1 modulators ===
The trace amine-associated receptor 1 (TAAR1) regulates the monoaminergic system and is a biological target for trace amines like β-phenethylamine and tyramine, the thyronamine 3-iodothyronamine, and drugs like amphetamines.

TAAR1 knockout mice show unchanged basal locomotor activity. However, they show enhanced hyperlocomotion with amphetamine, methamphetamine, and MDMA, as well as with β-phenethylamine. TAAR1 overexpression likewise is associated with unchanged basal locomotor activity. However, overexpression of the TAAR1 results in only weak locomotor stimulation by amphetamine. The TAAR1 full agonists RO5256390, ulotaront (SEP-363856), and LK00764 have been found to suppress locomotion in mice. Conversely, the TAAR1 full agonist RO5166017 and the TAAR1 partial agonists RO5073012, RO5203648, and RO5263397 on their own did not affect basal locomotion in rodents. Similarly, the TAAR1 partial agonist RO5263397 did not affect locomotor activity in monkeys. The TAAR1 antagonist EPPTB does not affect basal locomotor activity in rodents.

The TAAR1 full agonists RO5166017, RO5256390, and ulotaront all suppress psychostimulant-induced hyperlocomotion in mice. The TAAR1 partial agonists RO5073012, RO5203648, and RO5263397 suppress locomotor stimulation induced by cocaine. The TAAR1 partial agonist RO5203648 suppressed dextroamphetamine-induced hyperlocomotion at the highest assessed dose in rats but did not affect dextroamphetamine-induced hyperactivity in mice. It showed complex effects on methamphetamine-induced hyperlocomotion in rats, reducing early but potentiating late methamphetamine-induced hyperlocomotion with acute administration and suppressing methamphetamine-induced hyperlocomotion with chronic administration. The dual TAAR1 full agonist and serotonin 5-HT_{1} receptor modulator ulotaront did not affect dextroamphetamine-induced hyperlocomotion in rats. The TAAR1 weak partial agonist RO5073012 did not affect amphetamine-induced hyperlocomotion in mice but substantially restored the locomotor stimulation of amphetamine in mice with TAAR1 overexpression. In an unpublished study, EPPTB was reported to considerably reduce methamphetamine-induced hyperlocomotion in mice chronically exposed to methamphetamine, an effect that was absent in TAAR1 knockout mice. The TAAR1 full agonists RO5166017, RO5256390, ulotaront, and LK00764 and the TAAR1 partial agonists RO5203648 and RO5263397 suppress the hyperlocomotion induced by NMDA receptor antagonists like phencyclidine (PCP), L-687,414, and dizocilpine (MK-801) in rodents.

=== Other agents ===
Many tricyclic antidepressants (TCAs) do not increase locomotion, and instead often actually show behavioral sedation.

== Non-drug stimuli affecting locomotor activity ==
Light exposure has been found to increase locomotor activity and exploratory behavior in rodents.

== Similar behavioral measures ==
Other similar behavioral measures include stereotypy, exploratory behavior, climbing behavior, and jumping behavior. Amphetamines, which are dopamine releasing agents (DRAs) induce stereotypies in addition to hyperlocomotion. The dopamine receptor agonist apomorphine induces stereotypy and climbing behavior. The dopamine precursor levodopa (L-DOPA) induces jumping behavior. These effects can all be reversed by antipsychotics, which are dopamine receptor antagonists.

== See also ==
- Open field (animal test)
- Conditioned avoidance response test
- Animal models of schizophrenia
- Dopamine hypothesis of schizophrenia
