= L-687,414 =

Clinical data
- Other names: L-687414; L687414; cis-4-Methyl-HA-966
- Drug class: Glycine-site NMDA receptor antagonist or very weak partial agonist

Identifiers
- IUPAC name: (3S,4S)-3-amino-1-hydroxy-4-methylpyrrolidin-2-one
- CAS Number: 132695-96-6
- PubChem CID: 125556
- ChemSpider: 111692
- ChEMBL: ChEMBL165945
- CompTox Dashboard (EPA): DTXSID00157720

Chemical and physical data
- Formula: C_{5}H_{10}N_{2}O_{2}
- Molar mass: 130.147 g·mol^{−1}
- 3D model (JSmol): Interactive image
- SMILES: C[C@H]1CN(C(=O)[C@H]1N)O
- InChI: InChI=1S/C5H10N2O2/c1-3-2-7(9)5(8)4(3)6/h3-4,9H,2,6H2,1H3/t3-,4-/m0/s1; Key:SKYSFPFYQBZGDC-IMJSIDKUSA-N

L-687,414 is a glycine-site NMDA receptor antagonist or low-efficacy partial agonist (E_{max} ≈ 10%) which is used in scientific research. It is a close analogue of HA-966. The drug has been found to produce hyperlocomotion (a psychostimulant-like effect), analgesia or antinociceptive effects, anticonvulsant effects, and neuroprotective effects in animals. In contrast to uncompetitive NMDA receptor antagonists like ketamine and phencyclidine (PCP), L-687,414 has not been associated with the development of brain vacuoles (i.e., Olney's lesions) in animals.

Trace amine-associated receptor 1 (TAAR1) partial and full agonists, including RO5166017, RO5203648, RO5256390, and RO5263397, have been found to reverse the hyperlocomotion induced by L-687,414 as well as by other NMDA receptor antagonists like PCP in rodents. Similarly, glycine transporter 1 (GlyT1) inhibitors reverse the hyperlocomotion induced by L-687,414 in rodents. As such, TAAR1 agonists and GlyT1 inhibitors may have antipsychotic-like properties.
