= Artificial cerebrospinal fluid =

Buffer solution

Artificial cerebrospinal fluid (aCSF) is a buffer solution prepared with a composition similar to that of cerebrospinal fluid, that is used experimentally to immerse isolated brains, brain slices, or exposed brain regions to supply oxygen, maintain osmolarity, and to buffer pH at biological levels. ACSF is commonly used for electrophysiology experiments to maintain the neurons that are being studied.

== Composition ==
One protocol for electrophysiology recording suggests the following composition for aCSF, with the pH and oxygen level stabilized by bubbling with carbogen (95% O_{2} and 5% CO_{2}):

- 127 mM NaCl
- 1.0 mM KCl
- 1.2 mM KH_{2}PO_{4}
- 26 mM NaHCO_{3}
- 10 mM D-glucose
- 2.4 mM CaCl_{2}
- 1.3 mM MgCl_{2}
