= WAY-161503 =

Chemical compound

Identifiers
- IUPAC name: 8,9-dichloro-2,3,4,4a-tetrahydro-1H-pyrazino[1,2-a]quinoxalin-5(6H)-one
- CAS Number: 75704-24-4
- PubChem CID: 3906894
- ChemSpider: 3130042
- UNII: SCG2HM6F3D

Chemical and physical data
- Formula: C_{11}H_{11}Cl_{2}N_{3}O
- Molar mass: 272.13 g·mol^{−1}
- 3D model (JSmol): Interactive image
- SMILES: Clc1cc2NC(=O)C3CNCCN3c2cc1Cl
- InChI: InChI=1S/C11H11Cl2N3O/c12-6-3-8-9(4-7(6)13)16-2-1-14-5-10(16)11(17)15-8/h3-4,10,14H,1-2,5H2,(H,15,17); Key:PHGWDAICBXUJDU-UHFFFAOYSA-N

WAY-161503 is a full agonist of 5-HT_{2C} receptors (Ki = 3.3 nM for displacement of DOI), ~6-fold less potent at 5-HT_{2A} receptors (Ki = 18 nM) and 20-fold less potent at 5-HT_{2B} receptors (Ki = 60 nM). In functional studies, it stimulates calcium mobilization coupled to 5-HT_{2C}, 5-HT_{2B}, and 5-HT_{2A} receptors with EC_{50} values of 0.8, 1.8, and 7 nM, respectively. WAY-161503 has been reported to produce dose-dependent decreases in food intake in 24-hour fasted normal Sprague-Dawley rats, diet-induced obese mice, and obese Zucker rats with ED_{50} values of 1.9, 6.8, and 0.73 mg/kg, respectively.

WAY-161503 has been used to examine the role of 5-HT_{2C} receptors in rodent models of depression, locomotor activity, reinforcement, or motivated behaviors.
