= Nucleus accumbens =

Region of the basal forebrain

- Approximate location of the nucleus accumbens in the brain as perceived externally
- Nucleus accumbens of the mouse brain

Details
- Part of: Mesolimbic pathway Basal ganglia (Ventral striatum)
- Parts: Nucleus accumbens shell Nucleus accumbens core

Identifiers
- Latin: nucleus accumbens septi
- Acronym: NAc or NAcc
- MeSH: D009714
- NeuroNames: 277
- NeuroLex ID: birnlex_727
- TA98: A14.1.09.440
- TA2: 5558
- FMA: 61889

The nucleus accumbens (NAc or NAcc; also known as the accumbens nucleus, or formerly as the nucleus accumbens septi, Latin for 'nucleus adjacent to the septum') is a region in the basal forebrain rostral to the preoptic area of the hypothalamus. The nucleus accumbens and the olfactory tubercle collectively form the ventral striatum. The ventral striatum and dorsal striatum collectively form the striatum, which is the main component of the basal ganglia. The dopaminergic neurons of the mesolimbic pathway project onto the GABAergic medium spiny neurons of the nucleus accumbens and olfactory tubercle. Each cerebral hemisphere has its own nucleus accumbens, which can be divided into two structures: the nucleus accumbens core and the nucleus accumbens shell. These substructures have different morphology and functions.

Different NAcc subregions (core vs shell) and neuron subpopulations within each region (D1-type vs D2-type medium spiny neurons) are responsible for different cognitive functions. As a whole, the nucleus accumbens has a significant role in the cognitive processing of motivation, aversion, reward (i.e., incentive salience, pleasure, and positive reinforcement), and reinforcement learning (e.g., Pavlovian-instrumental transfer); hence, it has a significant role in addiction. In addition, part of the nucleus accumbens core is centrally involved in the induction of slow-wave sleep. The nucleus accumbens plays a lesser role in processing fear (a form of aversion), impulsivity, and the placebo effect. It is involved in the encoding of new motor programs as well.

== Structure ==
The nucleus accumbens is an aggregate of neurons which is described as having an outer shell and an inner core.

=== Input ===
Major glutamatergic inputs to the nucleus accumbens include the prefrontal cortex (particularly the prelimbic cortex and infralimbic cortex), basolateral amygdala, ventral hippocampus, thalamic nuclei (specifically the midline thalamic nuclei and intralaminar nuclei of the thalamus), and glutamatergic projections from the ventral tegmental area (VTA). The nucleus accumbens receives dopaminergic inputs from the ventral tegmental area, which connect via the mesolimbic pathway. The nucleus accumbens is often described as one part of a cortico-basal ganglia-thalamo-cortical loop.

Dopaminergic inputs from the VTA modulate the activity of GABAergic neurons within the nucleus accumbens. These neurons are activated directly or indirectly by euphoriant drugs (e.g., amphetamine, opiates, etc.) and by participating in rewarding experiences (e.g., sex, music, exercise, etc.).

Another major source of input comes from the CA1 and ventral subiculum of the hippocampus to the dorsomedial area of the nucleus accumbens. Slight depolarizations of cells in the nucleus accumbens correlates with positivity of the neurons of the hippocampus, making them more excitable. The correlated cells of these excited states of the medium spiny neurons in the nucleus accumbens are shared equally between the subiculum and CA1. The subiculum neurons are found to hyperpolarize (increase negativity) while the CA1 neurons "ripple" (fire > 50 Hz) in order to accomplish this priming.

The nucleus accumbens is one of the few regions that receives a high density of histaminergic projections from the tuberomammillary nucleus (the sole source of histamine neurons in the brain).

=== Output ===
The output neurons of the nucleus accumbens send axonal projections to the basal ganglia and the ventral analog of the globus pallidus, known as the ventral pallidum (VP). The VP, in turn, projects to the medial dorsal nucleus of the dorsal thalamus, which projects to the prefrontal cortex as well as back to the ventral and to dorsal striatum. Other efferents from the nucleus accumbens include connections with the tail of the ventral tegmental area, substantia nigra, and the reticular formation of the pons.

=== Shell ===
The nucleus accumbens shell (NAcc shell) is a substructure of the nucleus accumbens. The shell and core together form the entire nucleus accumbens.

Location: The shell is the outer region of the nucleus accumbens, and – unlike the core – is considered to be part of the extended amygdala, located at its rostral pole.

Cell types: Neurons in the nucleus accumbens are mostly medium spiny neurons (MSNs) containing mainly D1-type (i.e., DRD1 and DRD5) or D2-type (i.e., DRD2, DRD3, and DRD4) dopamine receptors. A subpopulation of MSNs contain both D1-type and D2-type receptors, with approximately 40% of striatal MSNs expressing both DRD1 and DRD2 mRNA. These mixed-type NAcc MSNs with both D1-type and D2-type receptors are mostly confined to the NAcc shell. The neurons in the shell, as compared to the core, have a lower density of dendritic spines, less terminal segments, and less branch segments than those in the core. The shell neurons project to the subcommissural part of the ventral pallidum as well as the ventral tegmental area and to extensive areas in the hypothalamus and extended amygdala.

Function: The shell of the nucleus accumbens is involved in the cognitive processing of reward, including subjective "liking" reactions to certain pleasurable stimuli, motivational salience, and positive reinforcement. That NAcc shell has also been shown to mediate specific Pavlovian-instrumental transfer, a phenomenon in which a classically conditioned stimulus modifies operant behavior. A "hedonic hotspot" or pleasure center which is responsible for the pleasurable or "liking" component of some intrinsic rewards is also located in a small compartment within the medial NAcc shell. Addictive drugs have a larger effect on dopamine release in the shell than in the core.

=== Core ===
The nucleus accumbens core (NAcc core) is the inner substructure of the nucleus accumbens.

Location: The nucleus accumbens core is part of the ventral striatum, located within the basal ganglia.

Cell types: The core of the NAcc is made up mainly of medium spiny neurons containing mainly D1-type or D2-type dopamine receptors. The D1-type medium spiny neurons mediate reward-related cognitive processes, whereas the D2-type medium spiny neurons mediate aversion-related cognition. The neurons in the core, as compared to the neurons in the shell, have an increased density of dendritic spines, branch segments, and terminal segments. From the core, the neurons project to other sub-cortical areas such as the globus pallidus and the substantia nigra. GABA is one of the main neurotransmitters in the NAcc, and GABA receptors are also abundant.

Function: The nucleus accumbens core is involved in the cognitive processing of motor function related to reward and reinforcement and the regulation of slow-wave sleep. Specifically, the core encodes new motor programs which facilitate the acquisition of a given reward in the future. The indirect pathway (i.e., D2-type) neurons in the NAcc core which co-express adenosine A_{2A} receptors activation-dependently promote slow-wave sleep. The NAcc core has also been shown to mediate general Pavlovian-instrumental transfer, a phenomenon in which a classically conditioned stimulus modifies operant behavior.

== Cell types ==
Approximately 95% of neurons in the NAcc are GABAergic medium spiny neurons (MSNs) which primarily express either D1-type or D2-type receptors; about 1–2% of the remaining neuronal types are large aspiny cholinergic interneurons and another 1–2% are GABAergic interneurons. Compared to the GABAergic MSNs in the shell, those in the core have an increased density of dendritic spines, branch segments, and terminal segments. From the core, the neurons project to other sub-cortical areas such as the globus pallidus and the substantia nigra. GABA is one of the main neurotransmitters in the NAcc, and GABA receptors are also abundant. These neurons are also the main projection or output neurons of the nucleus accumbens.

== Neurochemistry ==
Some of the neurotransmitters, neuromodulators, and hormones that signal through receptors within the nucleus accumbens include:

Dopamine: Dopamine is released into the nucleus accumbens following exposure to rewarding stimuli, including recreational drugs like substituted amphetamines, cocaine, nicotine and morphine.

Phenethylamine and tyramine: Phenethylamine and tyramine are trace amines which are synthesized in neurons that express the aromatic amino acid hydroxylase (AADC) enzyme, which includes all dopaminergic neurons. Both compounds function as dopaminergic neuromodulators which regulate the reuptake and release of dopamine into the Nacc via interactions with VMAT2 and TAAR1 in the axon terminal of mesolimbic dopamine neurons.

Glucocorticoids and dopamine: Glucocorticoid receptors are the only corticosteroid receptors in the nucleus accumbens shell. L-DOPA, steroids, and specifically glucocorticoids are currently known to be the only known endogenous compounds that can induce psychotic problems, so understanding the hormonal control over dopaminergic projections with regard to glucocorticoid receptors could lead to new treatments for psychotic symptoms. A recent study demonstrated that suppression of the glucocorticoid receptors led to a decrease in the release of dopamine, which may lead to future research involving anti-glucocorticoid drugs to potentially relieve psychotic symptoms.

GABA: A recent study on rats that used GABA agonists and antagonists indicated that GABA_{A} receptors in the NAcc shell have inhibitory control on turning behavior influenced by dopamine, and GABA_{B} receptors have inhibitory control over turning behavior mediated by acetylcholine.

Glutamate: Studies have shown that local blockade of glutamatergic NMDA receptors in the NAcc core impaired spatial learning. Another study demonstrated that both NMDA and AMPA (both glutamate receptors) play important roles in regulating instrumental learning.

Serotonin (5-HT): Overall, 5-HT synapses are more abundant and have a greater number of synaptic contacts in the NAcc shell than in the core. They are also larger and thicker, and contain more large dense core vesicles than their counterparts in the core.

Oxytocin: Oxytocin receptors are expressed in the nucleus accumbens of several species. Oxytocin may influence the integration of social signals in the NAcc, as disruption of oxytocin receptors in the NAcc alters pair-bonding in prairie voles and the learning of socially-related signals in mice.

== Function ==
=== Reward and reinforcement ===
The nucleus accumbens, being one part of the reward system, plays an important role in processing rewarding stimuli, reinforcing stimuli (e.g., food and water), and those which are both rewarding and reinforcing (addictive drugs, sex, and exercise). The predominant response of neurons in the nucleus accumbens to the reward sucrose is inhibition; the opposite is true in response to the administration of aversive quinine. Substantial evidence from pharmacological manipulation also suggests that reducing the excitability of neurons in the nucleus accumbens is rewarding, as, for example, would be true in the case of μ-opioid receptor stimulation. The blood oxygen level dependent signal (BOLD) in the nucleus accumbens is selectively increased during the perception of pleasant, emotionally arousing pictures and during mental imagery of pleasant, emotional scenes. However, as BOLD is thought to be an indirect measure of regional net excitation to inhibition, the extent to which BOLD measures valence dependent processing is unknown. Because of the abundance of NAcc inputs from limbic regions and strong NAcc outputs to motor regions, the nucleus accumbens has been described by Gordon Mogensen as the interface between the limbic and motor system.

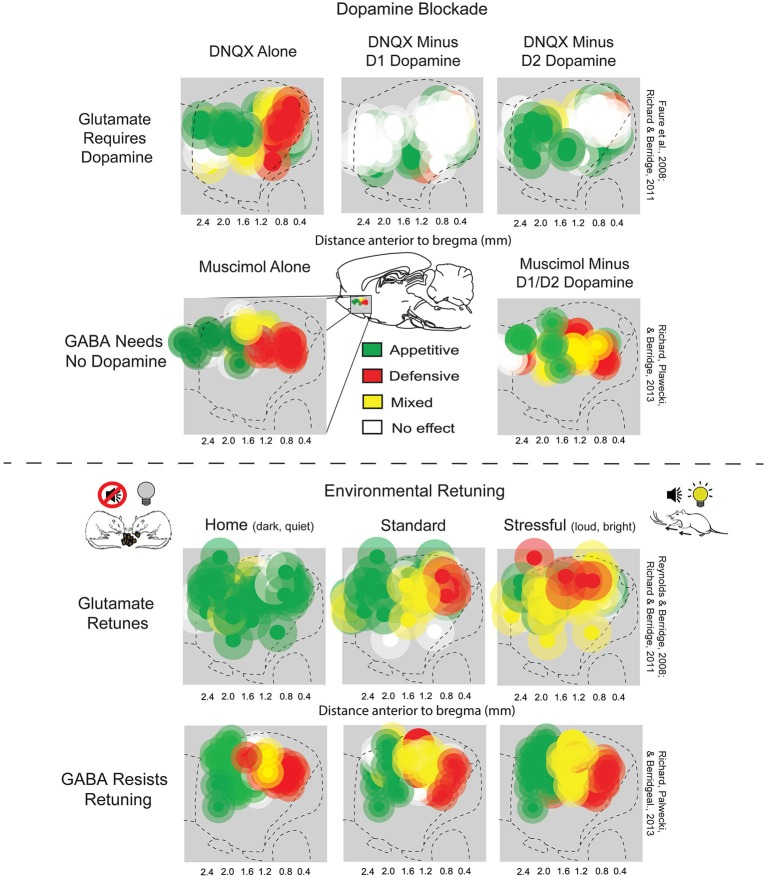
Tuning of appetitive and defensive reactions in the nucleus accumbens shell. (Above) AMPA blockade requires D1 function in order to produce motivated behaviors, regardless of valence, and D2 function to produce defensive behaviors. GABA agonism, on the other hand, does not require dopamine receptor function.(Below)The expansion of the anatomical regions that produce defensive behaviors under stress, and appetitive behaviors in the home environment produced by AMPA antagonism. This flexibility is less evident with GABA agonism.

The nucleus accumbens is causally related to the experience of pleasure. Microinjections of μ-opioid agonists, δ-opioid agonists or κ-opioid agonists in the rostrodorsal quadrant of the medial shell enhance "liking", while more caudal injections can inhibit disgust reactions, liking reactions, or both. The regions of the nucleus accumbens that can be ascribed a causal role in the production of pleasure are limited both anatomically and chemically, as besides opioid agonists only endocannabinoids can enhance liking. In the nucleus accumbens as a whole, dopamine, GABA receptor agonists, or AMPA antagonists solely modify motivation, while the same is true for opioid and endocannabinoids outside of the hotspot in the medial shell. A rostro-caudal gradient exists for the enhancement of appetitive versus fearful responses, the latter of which is traditionally thought to require only D1 receptor function, and the former of which requires both D1 and D2 function. One interpretation of this finding, the disinhibition hypothesis, posits that inhibition of accumbens MSNs (which are GABAergic) disinhibits downstream structures, enabling the expression of appetitive or consummatory behaviors. The motivational effects of AMPA antagonists, and to a lesser extent GABA agonists, is anatomically flexible. Stressful conditions can expand the fear inducing regions, while a familiar environment can reduce the size of the fear inducing region. Furthermore, cortical input from the orbitofrontal cortex (OFC) biases the response towards that of appetitive behavior, and infralimbic input, equivalent to the human subgenual cingulate cortex, suppresses the response regardless of valence.

The nucleus accumbens is neither necessary nor sufficient for instrumental learning, although manipulations can affect performance on instrumental learning tasks. One task where the effect of NAcc lesions is evident is Pavlovian-instrumental transfer (PIT), where a cue paired with a specific or general reward can enhance instrumental responding. Lesions to the core of the NAcc impair performance after devaluation and inhibit the effect of general PIT. On the other hand, lesions to the shell only impair the effect of specific PIT. This distinction is thought to reflect consummatory and appetitive conditioned responses in the NAcc shell and the NAcc core, respectively.

In the dorsal striatum, a dichotomy has been observed between D1-MSNs and D2-MSNs, with the former being reinforcing and enhancing locomotion, and the latter being aversive and reducing locomotion. Such a distinction has been traditionally assumed to apply to the nucleus accumbens as well, but evidence from pharmacological and optogenetics studies is conflicting. Furthermore, a subset of NAcc MSNs express both D1 and D2 MSNs, and pharmacological activation of D1 versus D2 receptors need not necessarily activate the neural populations exactly. While most studies show no effect of selective optogenetic stimulation of D1 or D2 MSNs on locomotor activity, one study has reported a decrease in basal locomotion with D2-MSN stimulation. While two studies have reported reduced reinforcing effects of cocaine with D2-MSN activation, one study has reported no effect. NAcc D2-MSN activation has also been reported to enhance motivation, as assessed by PIT, and D2 receptor activity is necessary for the reinforcing effects of VTA stimulation. A 2018 study reported that D2 MSN activation enhanced motivation via inhibiting the ventral pallidum, thereby disinhibiting the VTA.

==== Maternal behavior ====
An fMRI study conducted in 2005 found that when mother rats were in the presence of their pups the regions of the brain involved in reinforcement, including the nucleus accumbens, were highly active. Levels of dopamine increase in the nucleus accumbens during maternal behavior, while lesions in this area upset maternal behavior. When women are presented pictures of unrelated infants, fMRIs show increased brain activity in the nucleus accumbens and adjacent caudate nucleus, proportionate to the degree to which the women find these infants "cute".

=== Aversion ===
Activation of D1-type MSNs in the nucleus accumbens is involved in reward, whereas the activation of D2-type MSNs in the nucleus accumbens promotes aversion.

=== Slow-wave sleep ===
In late 2017, studies on rodents which utilized optogenetic and chemogenetic methods found that the indirect pathway (i.e., D2-type) medium spiny neurons in the nucleus accumbens core which co-express adenosine A_{2A} receptors and project to the ventral pallidum are involved in the regulation of slow-wave sleep. In particular, optogenetic activation of these indirect pathway NAcc core neurons induces slow-wave sleep and chemogenetic activation of the same neurons increases the number and duration of slow-wave sleep episodes. Chemogenetic inhibition of these NAcc core neurons suppresses sleep. In contrast, the D2-type medium spiny neurons in the NAcc shell which express adenosine A_{2A} receptors have no role in regulating slow-wave sleep.

== Clinical significance ==
=== Addiction ===
Current models of addiction from chronic drug use involve alterations in gene expression in the mesocorticolimbic projection. The most important transcription factors that produce these alterations are ΔFosB, cyclic adenosine monophosphate (cAMP) response element binding protein (CREB), and nuclear factor kappa B (NFκB). ΔFosB is the most significant gene transcription factor in addiction since its viral or genetic overexpression in the nucleus accumbens is necessary and sufficient for many of the neural adaptations and behavioral effects (e.g., expression-dependent increases in self-administration and reward sensitization) seen in drug addiction. ΔFosB overexpression has been implicated in addictions to alcohol (ethanol), cannabinoids, cocaine, methylphenidate, nicotine, opioids, phencyclidine, propofol, and substituted amphetamines, among others. Increases in nucleus accumbens ΔJunD expression can reduce or, with a large increase, even block most of the neural alterations seen in chronic drug abuse (i.e., the alterations mediated by ΔFosB).

ΔFosB also plays an important role in regulating behavioral responses to natural rewards, such as palatable food, sex, and exercise. Natural rewards, like drugs of abuse, induce ΔFosB in the nucleus accumbens, and chronic acquisition of these rewards can result in a similar pathological addictive state through ΔFosB overexpression. Consequently, ΔFosB is the key transcription factor involved in addictions to natural rewards as well; in particular, ΔFosB in the nucleus accumbens is critical for the reinforcing effects of sexual reward. Research on the interaction between natural and drug rewards suggests that psychostimulants and sexual behavior act on similar biomolecular mechanisms to induce ΔFosB in the nucleus accumbens and possess cross-sensitization effects that are mediated through ΔFosB.

Similar to drug rewards, non-drug rewards also increase the level of extracellular dopamine in the NAcc shell. Drug-induced dopamine release in the NAcc shell and NAcc core is usually not prone to habituation (i.e., the development of drug tolerance: a decrease in dopamine release from future drug exposure as a result of repeated drug exposure); on the contrary, repeated exposure to drugs that induce dopamine release in the NAcc shell and core typically results in sensitization (i.e., the amount of dopamine that is released in the NAcc from future drug exposure increases as a result of repeated drug exposure). Sensitization of dopamine release in the NAcc shell following repeated drug exposure serves to strengthen stimulus-drug associations (i.e., classical conditioning that occurs when drug use is repeatedly paired with environmental stimuli) and these associations become less prone to extinction (i.e., "unlearning" these classically conditioned associations between drug use and environmental stimuli becomes more difficult). After repeated pairing, these classically conditioned environmental stimuli (e.g., contexts and objects that are frequently paired with drug use) often become drug cues which function as secondary reinforcers of drug use (i.e., once these associations are established, exposure to a paired environmental stimulus triggers a craving or desire to use the drug which they've become associated with).

Unlike with drugs, the release of dopamine in the NAcc shell by many types of rewarding non-drug stimuli typically undergoes habituation following repeated exposure (i.e., the amount of dopamine that is released from future exposure to a rewarding non-drug stimulus normally decreases as a result of repeated exposure to that stimulus).

Summary of addiction-related plasticity
Form of neuroplasticity or behavioral plasticity	Type of reinforcer						Ref.
Form of neuroplasticity or behavioral plasticity	Opiates	Psychostimulants	High fat or sugar food	Sexual intercourse	Physical exercise (aerobic)	Environmental enrichment	Ref.
ΔFosB expression in nucleus accumbens D1-type MSNs	↑	↑	↑	↑	↑	↑	
Behavioral plasticity
Escalation of intake	Yes	Yes	Yes				
Psychostimulant cross-sensitization	Yes	Not applicable	Yes	Yes	Attenuated	Attenuated	
Psychostimulant self-administration	↑	↑	↓		↓	↓	
Psychostimulant conditioned place preference	↑	↑	↓	↑	↓	↑	
Reinstatement of drug-seeking behavior	↑	↑			↓	↓	
Neurochemical plasticity
CREB phosphorylation in the nucleus accumbens	↓	↓	↓		↓	↓	
Sensitized dopamine response in the nucleus accumbens	No	Yes	No	Yes			
Altered striatal dopamine signaling	↓DRD2, ↑DRD3	↑DRD1, ↓DRD2, ↑DRD3	↑DRD1, ↓DRD2, ↑DRD3		↑DRD2	↑DRD2	
Altered striatal opioid signaling	No change or ↑μ-opioid receptors	↑μ-opioid receptors ↑κ-opioid receptors	↑μ-opioid receptors	↑μ-opioid receptors	No change	No change	
Changes in striatal opioid peptides	↑dynorphin No change: enkephalin	↑dynorphin	↓enkephalin		↑dynorphin	↑dynorphin	
Mesocorticolimbic synaptic plasticity
Number of dendrites in the nucleus accumbens	↓	↑		↑			
Dendritic spine density in the nucleus accumbens	↓	↑		↑			

=== Depression ===
In April 2007, two research teams reported on having inserted electrodes into the nucleus accumbens in order to use deep brain stimulation to treat severe depression. In 2010, experiments reported that deep brain stimulation of the nucleus accumbens was successful in decreasing depression symptoms in 50% of patients who did not respond to other treatments such as electroconvulsive therapy. The nucleus accumbens has also been used as a target to treat small groups of patients with therapy-refractory obsessive-compulsive disorder.

=== Ablation ===
To treat addiction and in an attempt to treat mental illness radiofrequency ablation of the nucleus accumbens has been performed. The results are inconclusive and controversial.

=== Placebo effect ===
Activation of the NAcc has been shown to occur in the anticipation of effectiveness of a drug when a user is given a placebo, indicating a contributing role of the nucleus accumbens in the placebo effect.

== Additional images ==
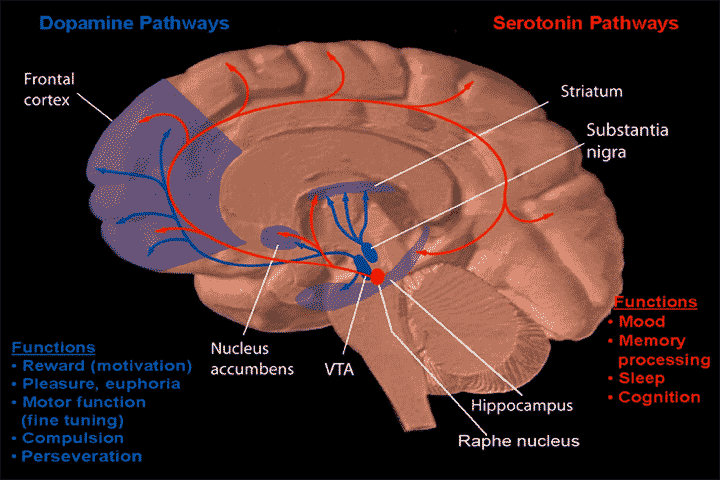
Dopamine and serotonin

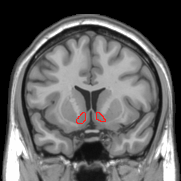
MRI coronal slice showing nucleus accumbens outlined in red

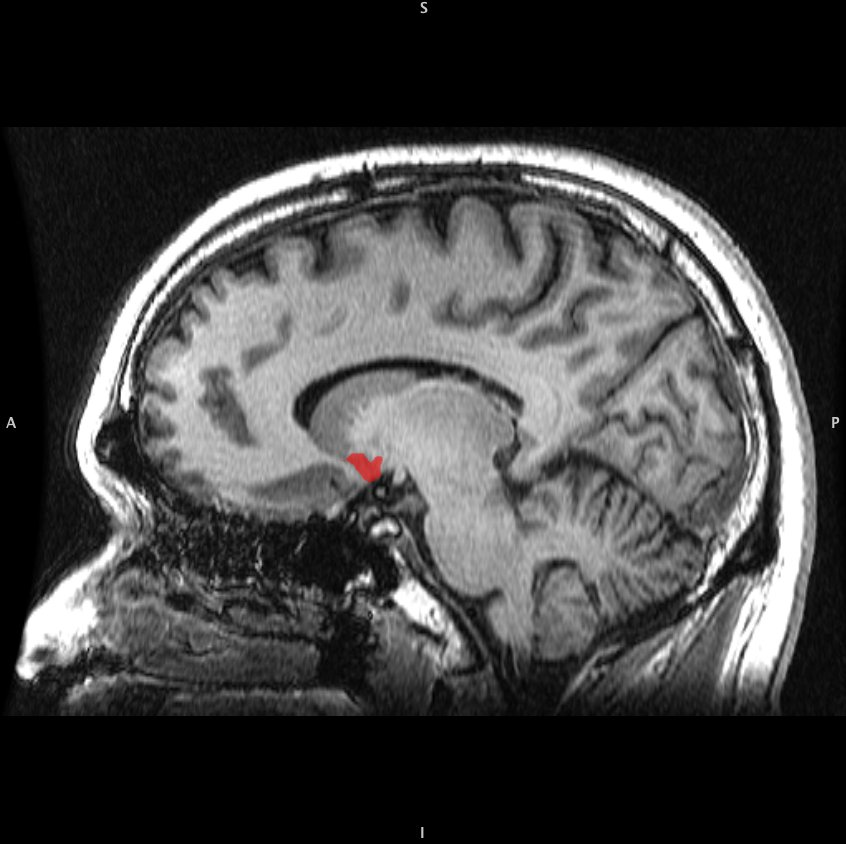
Sagittal MRI slice with highlighting (red) indicating the nucleus accumbens

Nucleus accumbens highlighted in green on coronal T1 MRI images

Nucleus accumbens highlighted in green on sagittal T1 MRI images

Nucleus accumbens highlighted in green on transversal T1 MRI images

== See also ==
- Septal nuclei
