= Self-administration =

- MeSH: D012646

Self-administration is, in its medical sense, the process of a subject administering a pharmacological substance to themself. A clinical example of this is the subcutaneous "self-injection" of insulin by a diabetic patient.

In animal experimentation, self-administration is a form of operant conditioning where the reward is a drug. This drug can be administered remotely through an implanted intravenous line or an intracerebroventricular injection. Self-administration of putatively addictive drugs is considered one of the most valid experimental models to investigate drug-seeking and drug-taking behavior. The higher the frequency with which a test animal emits the operant behavior, the more rewarding (and addictive), the test substance is considered. Self-administration of addictive drugs has been studied using humans, non-human primates, mice, and, most commonly, rats. It has also been observed in invertebrates such as ants, which is not a typical model animal used for the study of human addiction.

Self-administration of heroin and cocaine is used to screen drugs for possible effects in reducing drug-taking behavior, especially reinstatement of drug-seeking after extinction. Drugs with this effect may be useful for treating people with drug addiction by helping them establish abstinence or reducing their probability of relapsing to substance use after a period of abstinence.

In a prominent model of self-administration developed by George Koob, rats are allowed to self-administer cocaine for either 1 hour each day (short access) or 6 hours each day (long access). Those animals who are allowed to self-administer for 6 hours a day show behavior that is thought to resemble cocaine dependence, such as an escalation of the total dose taken during each session and an increase in the dose taken when cocaine is first made available.

== Background ==
The "self-administration" behavioral paradigm serves as an animal behavioral model of the human pathology of addiction. During the task, animal subjects are operant conditioned to perform one action, typically a lever press, in order to receive a drug. Reinforcement (through the use of the drug) occurs contingent upon the subject performing the desired behavior. Drug dosing in self-administration studies is response-dependent. This is an important element of creating a disease model of drug addiction in humans because response-independent drug administration is associated with increased toxicity and different neurobiological, neurochemical, and behavioral effects. In summary, the effects of response-dependent drug dosing greatly differ from response-independent drug dosing and self-administration studies appropriately capture this distinction.

=== History ===
As far back as the mid-20th century, researchers have investigated animals’ drive to consume addictive substances in order to better understand human addictive processes. Spragg was one of the first researchers to create a model of chronic morphinism in a chimpanzee to explore the role of operant conditioning in relation to a drug dependency. When deprived of both food and morphine, chimpanzees would repeatedly attempt to seek out the drug of choice, even doing so much as to physically pull the experimenter into the room housing morphine and syringes. Weeks (1962) published an account of the first true use of the intravenous self-administration paradigm in a study aiming to model morphine addiction in unrestrained rats. For the first time, an addictive substance served as an operant reinforcer and rats self-administered morphine to satiety in stereotyped response patterns.

The scientific community quickly adopted the self-administration paradigm as a behavioral means to examine addictive processes and adapted it to non-human primates. Thompson and Schuster (1964) studied the relative reinforcement properties of morphine in restrained rhesus monkeys using intravenous self-administration. Significant changes in response to other types of reinforcers (i.e., food, shock avoidance) were observed in drug-dependent subjects. In 1969, Deneau, Yanagita and Seevers provided macaque monkeys free access to a variety of addictive substances for investigating whether nonhuman primates would voluntarily initiate self-administration of these substances. Initiation and maintenance of self-administration produced dependence and toxicity in monkeys, thereby more closely approximating important aspects of drug addiction in humans and allowing for the first of modern self-administration studies.

The procedure of testing the efficacy of a pharmacological agent as a reinforcer would soon become a standard assay. Most frequently, studies were performed in nonhuman primates to identify addictive potential, as required by the drug development process. In 1983, Collins et al. published a landmark paper in which rats were exposed to a battery of 27 psychoactive substances. The team compared test drug self-administration rates with saline vehicle self-administration rates. If animals self-administered at a rate significantly greater than vehicles, the drug was considered an active reinforcer with addictive potential. With few exceptions, the abuse liability observed in rats paralleled that observed from previous research in monkeys. In light of these similarities between the different animal models, it was identified that the addictive potential of psychoactive substances could be investigated using rats instead of nonhuman primates.

== Technique ==
=== Acquisition ===
Operant conditioning represents the behavioral paradigm underlying self-administration studies. Although not always required, subjects may be first pre-trained to perform some action, such as a lever press or nose poke to receive a food or water reward (under food- or water- restricted conditions, respectively). Following this initial training, the reinforcer is replaced by a test drug to be administered by one of the following methods: oral, inhalation, intracerebral, intravenous. Intravenous catheterization is used most commonly because it maximizes bioavailability and has a rapid onset, although is inappropriate for drugs taken orally, such as alcohol. Humans suffering from addiction often resort to intravenous drug use for similar reasons, so this route of administration increases the face validity of the construct.

=== Maintenance ===
Upon presentation of the drug to the subject, a number of experimental variables might be manipulated to test hypotheses:

=== Dose-response relationship ===
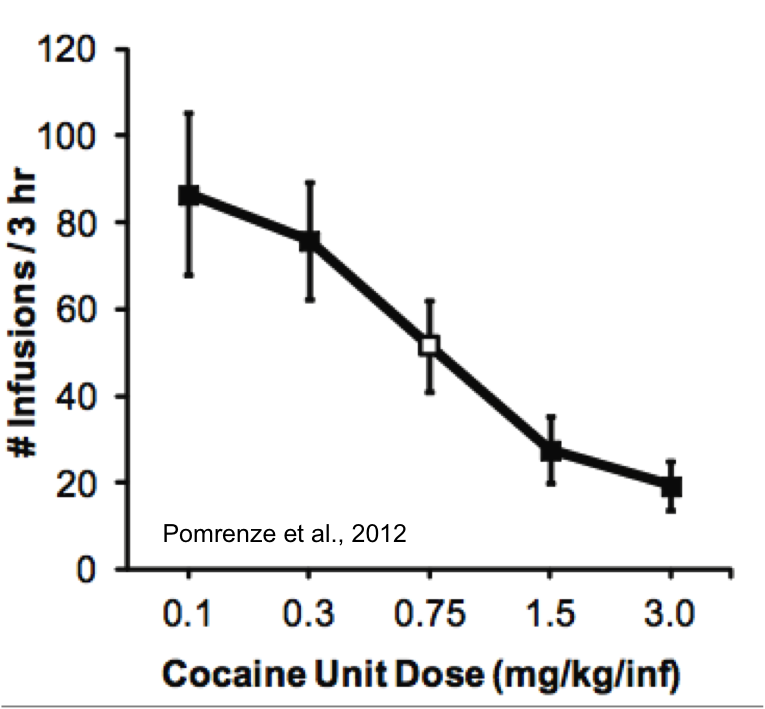
Dose-response relationship in cocaine self-administering mice

Both humans and animals will adjust the rate and number of drug infusions to maintain stable rewarding blood levels of drugs, like cocaine. A dilute dose of cocaine will be administered intravenously at a faster rate than a concentrated dose of cocaine.

=== Reinforcement schedules ===
Continuous reinforcement: A single operant response triggers the dispense of a single dose of the reinforcer. A time-out period may follow each operant response that successfully yields a dose of reinforcer; during this period the lever used in training may be retracted preventing the animal from making further responses. Alternatively, operant responses will fail to produce drug administration allowing previous injections to take effect. Moreover, time-outs also help prevent subjects from overdosing during self-administration experiments. Fixed-ratio studies require a predefined number of operant responses to dispense one unit of the reinforcer. Standard fixed ratio reinforcement schedules include FR5 and FR10, requiring 5 and 10 operant responses to dispense a unit of reinforcer, respectively. Progressive ratio reinforcement schedules utilize a multiplicative increase in the number of operant responses required to dispense a unit of the reinforcer. For example, successive trials might require 5 operant responses per unit of reward, then 10 responses per unit of reward, then 15, and so on. The number of operant responses required per unit of reinforcer may be altered after each trial, each session, or any other time period as defined by the experimenter. Progressive ratio reinforcement schedules provide information about the extent that a pharmacological agent is reinforcing through the breakpoint. The breakpoint is the number of operant responses at which the subject ceases engaging in self-administration, defined by some period of time between operant responses (generally up to an hour). The data from ratio schedules are also analyzed using behavioral economics, which treats the number of responses required per infusion as the drug's price. Plotting consumption across increasing prices produces a demand curve, and the curve's elasticity demonstrates how strongly an animal maintains its intake as the cost rises. Fixed interval (FI) schedules require that a set amount of time pass between drug infusions, regardless of the number of times that the desired response is performed. This “refractory” period can prevent the animal from overdosing on a drug. Variable interval (VI) schedules of reinforcement are identical to FI schedules, except that the amount of time between reinforced operant responses varies, making it more difficult for the animal to predict when the drug will be delivered.

Second-order reinforcement schedules build on basic reinforcement schedules by introducing a conditioned stimulus that has previously been paired with the reinforcer (such as the illumination of a light). Second-order schedules are built from two simpler schedules; completion of the first schedule results in the presentation of an abbreviated version conditioned stimulus, following completion of a fixed-interval, the drug is delivered, alongside the full-length conditioned stimulus. Second-order schedules result in a very high rate of operant responding at the presentation of the conditioned reinforcer becomes reinforcing in its own right. Benefits of this schedule include the ability to investigate the motivation to seek the drug, without the interference of the drug's own pharmacological effects, maintaining a high level of responding with relatively few drug infusions, reduced risk of self-administered overdose, and external validity to human populations where environmental context can provide a strong reinforcing effect for drug use.

=== Extinction and reinstatement ===
Extinction involves the discontinuation of a particular reinforcer in response to operant behavior, such as replacing a reinforcing drug infusion with a saline vehicle. When the reinforcing element of the operant paradigm is no longer present, a gradual reduction in operant responses results in the eventual cessation or “extinction” of the operant behavior. Reinstatement is the restoration of operant behavior to acquire a reinforcer, often triggered by external events/cues or exposure to the original reinforcer itself. Reinstatement can be broken into a few broad categories:

Drug-induced reinstatement: exposure to a reinforcing drug after the extinction of drug-seeking operant behavior can often reinstate drug-seeking, and can even occur when the new drug of exposure is different from the original reinforcer. This is thought to be strongly linked to drug sensitization Cue-induced reinstatement: environmental cues associated with drug administration can trigger drug reinstatement by acting as conditioned stimuli, even during drug abstinence

1. Environmental surroundings, as well as drug-associated behavior or actions, can function as environmental cues.

2. Stress-induced reinstatement: in many cases, a stressor can reinstate drug-seeking in a drug-abstinent animal. This can include (but is not limited to) acute stressors such as foot-shock or social defeat stress. In many cases, it appears that social stress can potentiate drug reinstatement just as strongly as exposure to the drug itself

== Apparatus ==
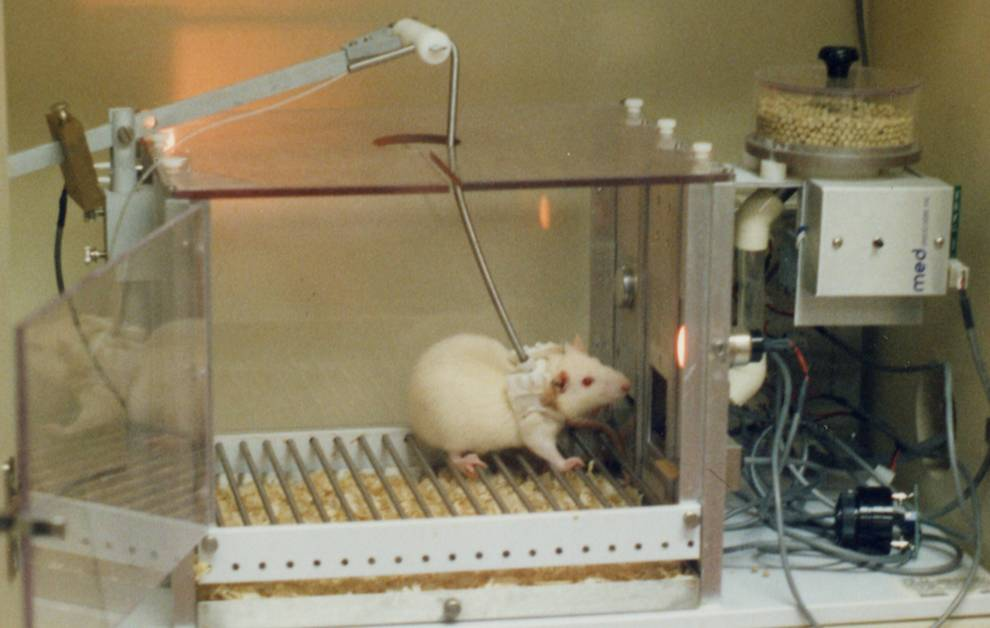
Self-administration apparatus

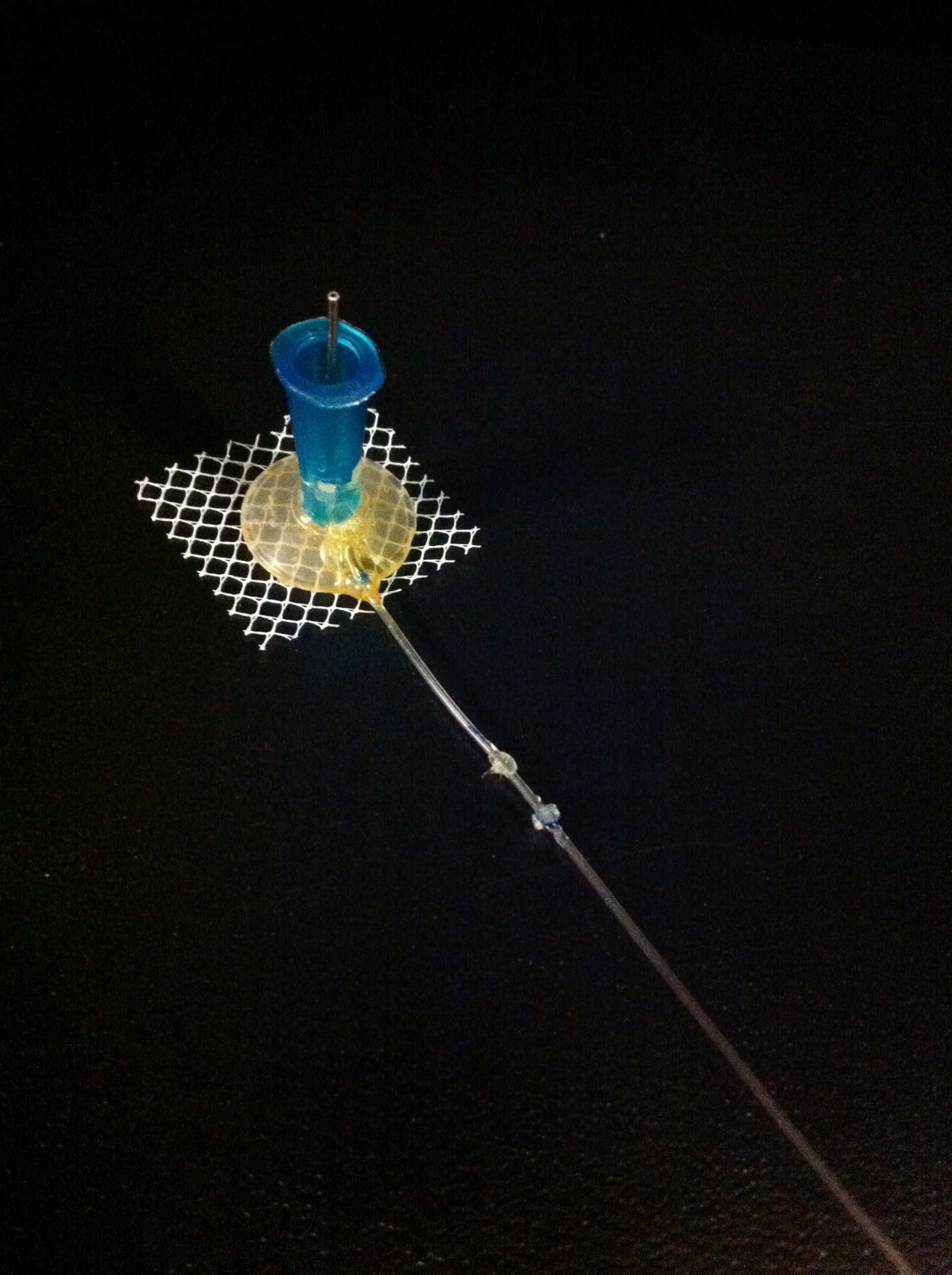
Back-mount intravenous mouse catheter for drug self-administration

Animal self-administration experiments are typically performed in standard operant conditioning chambers adapted for the catheters used to deliver a drug intravenously. The catheter is secured to the animal by a harness or backplate and is tethered to a protective leash that extends upward through a hole in the top of a chamber, where it attaches to a rotating swivel on a mechanical arm that allows the subject to move around freely. The chamber houses two levers: one whose depression results in the delivery of a drug, the other whose depression does nothing. Activity on these levers can be used to measure drug administration (via activity at the drug-inducing lever) as well as changes in nonspecific behavior that reflect short- and long-term effects of the drug (via activity at the non-inducing lever). The sterile intravenous catheter used to deliver the drug into the bloodstream of the subject is typically composed of flexible plastic, silastic tubing, and nylon mesh placed subcutaneously. It is attached to a mechanical pump that can be calibrated to deliver a specific amount of drug upon depression of one of the levers in the chamber. Other chamber modifications are required if the drug is to be delivered orally or via inhalation, such as liquid containers or an aerosol distribution mechanism.

== Significant findings ==
Self-administration studies have long been considered the “standard” in addiction research using both animal and human models. Conducting self-administration studies in animal models provides a much greater level of experimental flexibility than in humans because investigating the effects of novel pharmacological drug treatments poses significantly fewer ethical and practical barriers. In 1999, Pilla and colleagues published in Nature a study documenting the efficacy of a partial D3-agonist (BP-897) in reducing environmental cue-induced cocaine craving and vulnerability to relapse. An interesting aspect of this study was the use of second-order reinforcement schedules to identify a dissociation in the effects of BP-897 in that the drug inhibits cue-induced cocaine-seeking but has no primary reinforcement effect. This latter condition is important for any pharmacological agent to be used in the treatment of addiction—drugs used to treat addiction should be less reinforcing than the drug whose addiction they treat and optimally have no reinforcing effects.

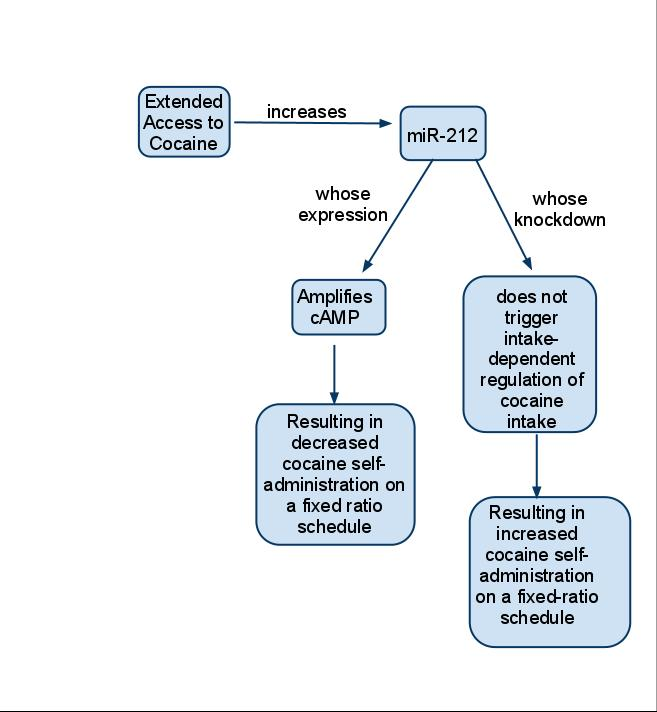

A 2010 study published in Nature showed an upregulation of microRNA-212 in the dorsal striatum of rats previously exposed to cocaine for extended periods. Animals infected with a viral vector overexpressing miR-212 in the dorsal striatum produced the same initial levels of cocaine intake; however, drug consumption progressively decreased as net cocaine exposure increased. The authors of the study noted that viral-infected animals exhibited decreased operant responding during the post-infusion time-out period and proposed that this demonstrated a reduction in compulsive drug-seeking behavior.(Hollander et al.) miR-212 acts through Raf1 to enhance the CREB response; CREB-TORC is known to negatively regulate the reinforcing effects of cocaine. (Hollander et al.) This study provides one example (miR-212, owing to its amplification of CREB) of a self-administration study that may provide potential therapeutic targets for the treatment of cocaine addiction. One of the most important advances to emerge from self-administration studies comes from a behavioral model for addiction in animals. This model relies on observation of three separate phenomena to classify a rat as “addicted:” 1) 'Persistence in drug-seeking: Depends on the attempts of rats to obtain drug during time-out or no-periods in the self-administration apparatus. 2) Resistance to punishment: Measured by how much rats maintain rates of self-administration when cocaine infusion is paired with an electric shock. 3) Motivation for the drug: Measured by the breakpoint in progressive ratio reinforcement.

The researchers used an additional test to further support the classification of a rat as “addicted” by measuring relapse rates during reinstatement paradigms. Human drug addicts reportedly relapse at a rate of >90% as measured from the initial diagnosis. Rats that responded at high rates after some form of cue-induced reinstatement could be considered likely to relapse. This model provided an important advancement for the method of self-administration because it allows animal models to better approximate the physiological and behavioral aspects of drug addiction in humans.

Self-administration experiments can also be paired with methods such as in vitro electrophysiology or molecular biology to understand the effects of addiction on neural circuitry. Self-administration studies have allowed researchers to locate a staggering number of changes in brain signaling that occur in addiction. One example of such a study involved examining synaptic plasticity in rats undergoing the behavioral shift to addiction. Using the criteria for classifying rats as “addicts” or “non-addicts” as put forth by Deroche-Gamonet et al., it was found that addicted rats display a prolonged and persistent impairment in mGluR2/3-dependent Long-Term Depression. Despite exposure to the same self-administration paradigm, control rats recovered this form of synaptic plasticity. The authors of the study propose an important explanation for their results in that this specific loss of plasticity over an extended period is responsible for the progressive loss of controlled drug use. This represents a potential molecular mechanism by which addicts might differ from non-addicts and undergo pathological learning processes during the development of addiction.

Much like animal studies, human experiments that pair self-administration studies with additional neuroscientific techniques provide unique insight into the disease of addiction. Human self-administration studies have gained momentum with the widespread use of fMRI technology to measure BOLD signals. Brain imaging coupled with human self-administration studies with the laboratory have led to the development of a three-stage model of human neurocircuitry of addiction: Binge/Intoxication, Preoccupation/Anticipation, and Withdrawal/Negative Effect. Koob, Lloyd, and Mason reviewed the laboratory models approximating each stage of the model of human addiction. The binge-intoxication phase traditionally has been modeled by drug or alcohol self-administration; the psychological effects of addiction might be modeled by the increased motivation for self-administration observed in drug-dependent animals. Self-administration studies capably model the somatic effects of addiction, but many of the most deleterious effects related to drug addiction can be considered psychological in nature. Models like the one published by Deroche-Gamonet and colleagues in 2004 better approximate the effects of addiction on physiology and psychology, but animal models are inherently limited in their ability to reproduce human behavior.

The use of the self-administration methodology to model human drug addiction provides insight into the physiological and behavioral effects of the disease. While self-administration experiments in humans or animals each pose barriers to complete understanding of addiction, the scientific community continues to invest an effort in both avenues of research in improving understanding and treatment of addiction.
