= Slice preparation =

Laboratory method involving brain slices

The slice preparation or brain slice is a laboratory technique in electrophysiology that allows the study of neurons from various brain regions in isolation from the rest of the brain, in an ex-vivo condition. Brain tissue is initially sliced via a tissue slicer then immersed in artificial cerebrospinal fluid (aCSF) for stimulation and/or recording. The technique allows for greater experimental control, through elimination of the effects of the rest of the brain on the circuit of interest, careful control of the physiological conditions through perfusion of substrates through the incubation fluid, to precise manipulation of neurotransmitter activity through perfusion of agonists and antagonists. However, the increase in control comes with a decrease in the ease with which the results can be applied to the whole neural system.

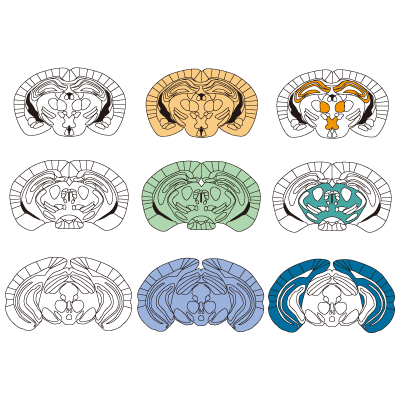
Mouse brain slices, schematically

== Slice preparation techniques ==
Free hand sectioning is a type of preparation techniques where a skilled operator uses razor blade for slicing. The blade is wetted with an isotonic solution before cutting to avoid tissue smudging during cutting. This method has several drawbacks such as sample size limitation and difficult to observe progress. Modern microtome devices such as Compresstome microtomes are used to prepare slices as these devices have less limitations.

== Benefits ==
When investigating mammalian CNS activity, slice preparation has several advantages and disadvantages when compared to in vivo study. Slice preparation is both faster and cheaper than in vivo preparation, and does not require anaesthesia beyond the initial sacrifice. The removal of the brain tissue from the body removes the mechanical effects of heartbeat and respiration, which allows for extended intracellular recording. The physiological conditions of the sample, such as oxygen and carbon dioxide levels, or pH of the extracellular fluid can be carefully adjusted and maintained. Slice work under a microscope also allows for careful placement of the recording electrode, which would not be possible in the closed in vivo system. Removing the brain tissue means that there is no blood–brain barrier, which allows drugs, neurotransmitters or their modulators, or ions to be perfused throughout the neural tissue. Furthermore, the slice preparation method can also be used as a brain-injury model. Finally, whilst the circuit isolated in a brain slice represents a simplified model of the circuit in situ, it maintains structural connections that are lost in cell cultures, or homogenised tissue.

== Limitations ==
Slice preparation also has some drawbacks. Most obviously, an isolated slice lacks the usual input and output connections present in the whole brain. Further, the slicing process may itself compromise the tissue. To minimize complications in the slicing process, a more sophisticated tissue slicer may be used such as the Compresstome, a type of vibrating microtome used to maximizes the amount of viable tissue cells. Additionally, slicing of the brain can damage the top and bottom of the section, but beyond that, the process of decapitation and extraction of the brain before the slice is placed in solution may have effects on the tissue which are not yet understood. The slice preparation procedure itself induces a rapid and robust phenotype change in microglia, the consequences of which need to be taken into consideration when interpreting results. During recording, the tissue also "ages", degrading at a faster rate than in the intact animal. Finally, the artificial composition of the bathing solution means that the presence and relative concentrations of the necessary compounds may not be present.

== See also ==
- Histology § Sample preparation

== Bibliography ==
- Schurr, Avital, Brain Slice Preparation in Electrophysiology, Kopf Carrier, Vol 15
