= Catecholaminergic =

Related to catecholamines (dopamine, adrenaline and noradrenaline)

Catecholaminergic /kætɛkɒlɛmɛˈnərdʒɪk/ means "involving, liberating, or mediated by catecholamines." The catecholamine neurotransmitters include dopamine, epinephrine (adrenaline), and norepinephrine (noradrenaline).

A catecholaminergic agent (or drug) is a chemical which functions to directly modulate the catecholamine systems in the body or brain. Examples include adrenergics and dopaminergics.

== See also ==
- Adenosinergic
- Cannabinoidergic
- Cholinergic
- GABAergic
- Glutamatergic
- Glycinergic
- Histaminergic
- Monoaminergic
- Opioidergic
