= Glutamatergic =

Affecting glutamate systems in the brain

Glutamatergic means "involving the release of, or activated by, glutamate". A glutamatergic agent (or drug) is a chemical that directly modulates the excitatory amino acid (glutamate/aspartate) system in the body or brain. Examples include:

- Excitatory amino acid receptor agonists
- Excitatory amino acid receptor antagonists
- Excitatory amino acid reuptake inhibitors

== See also ==
- Adenosinergic
- Adrenergic
- Cannabinoidergic
- Cholinergic
- Dopaminergic
- GABAergic
- GHBergic
- Glycinergic
- Histaminergic
- Melatonergic
- Monoaminergic
- Opioidergic
- Serotonergic
- Sigmaergic
