= C32H43N5O5 =

The molecular formula C_{32}H_{43}N_{5}O_{5} (molar mass: 577.71 g/mol) may refer to:

- Dihydroergocryptine
- Epicriptine, or beta-dihydroergocryptine
