= LEK-8842 =

Clinical data
- Other names: LEK8842; TRALA-01; TRALA01; N-Methyl-N-(2-propynyl)lysergamide; 9,10-Didehydro-N-methyl-N-(2-propynyl)-6-methylergoline-8β-carboxamide; "Compound 2a"
- Drug class: Serotonin receptor modulator; Serotonin 5-HT_{2A} receptor agonist
- ATC code: None

Identifiers
- IUPAC name: (6aR,9R)-N,7-dimethyl-N-prop-2-ynyl-6,6a,8,9-tetrahydro-4H-indolo[4,3-fg]quinoline-9-carboxamide
- PubChem CID: 164461
- ChemSpider: 64883692
- ChEMBL: ChEMBL5618531
- CompTox Dashboard (EPA): DTXSID20165322

Chemical and physical data
- Formula: C_{20}H_{21}N_{3}O
- Molar mass: 319.408 g·mol^{−1}
- 3D model (JSmol): Interactive image
- SMILES: CN1C[C@@H](C=C2[C@H]1CC3=CNC4=CC=CC2=C34)C(=O)N(C)CC#C
- InChI: InChI=1S/C20H21N3O/c1-4-8-22(2)20(24)14-9-16-15-6-5-7-17-19(15)13(11-21-17)10-18(16)23(3)12-14/h1,5-7,9,11,14,18,21H,8,10,12H2,2-3H3/t14-,18-/m1/s1; Key:NTIBYWGZNANJNM-RDTXWAMCSA-N

LEK-8842, also known as N-methyl-N-(2-propynyl)lysergamide or as TRALA-01, is a serotonin receptor modulator of the lysergamide family related to the psychedelic drug LSD.

The drug is described as showing serotonin 5-HT_{2} receptor partial agonistic activity and α-adrenergic receptor agonistic activity based on in-vitro tissue assays that included selective antagonist challenges. Subsequently, it was found to be a potent partial agonist of the serotonin 5-HT_{2A} and 5-HT_{2B} receptors and to show affinity for the serotonin 5-HT_{2C} receptor. LEK-8842 produces effects in animals including serotonin behavioral syndrome, hyperthermia, pressor effects, pupil dilation, and uterine contractions.

The chemical synthesis of LEK-8842 has been described. Several analogues of LEK-8842 have been described, for instance LEK-8804 (N-(2-propynyl)lysergamide) among others.

LEK-8842 was first described in the scientific literature by 1992. It was developed by the Slovenian pharmaceutical company LEK Pharmaceuticals. Subsequently, LEK-8842 was studied and patented by Matthias Liechti and Daniel Trachsel and colleagues in association with Mind Medicine (Definium Therapeutics) in 2023.

== See also ==
- Substituted lysergamide
- LEK-8822 (9,10-dihydro-LEK-8842)
- LEK-8841 (2-bromo-LEK-8842)
- LEK-8829 (desoxy-LEK-8842)
- TRALA-12 (likely didehydro-LSD or DDH-LSD)
