= C20H22N4O2 =

The molecular formula C_{20}H_{22}N_{4}O_{2} (molar mass: 350.422 g/mol) may refer to:

- Phenylahistin
- Romergoline
- FCE-24379
