= Dihydro-LSD =

Dihydro-LSD (DH-LSD), also known as dihydro-lysergic acid diethylamide, may refer to:

- 2,3-Dihydro-LSD
- 9,10-Dihydro-LSD
