= C20H27N3O =

The molecular formula C_{20}H_{27}N_{3}O (molar mass: 325.456 g/mol) may refer to:

- 2,3-Dihydro-LSD
- 9,10-Dihydro-LSD
- 10,11-Seco-LSD
