= José de Ocariz =

Spanish diplomat (1750–1805)

José de Ocáriz (1750–1805) was a Spanish diplomat, remembered for attempting, as consul to France during the early years of the French Revolution, to intercede for the imprisoned Louis XVI.

He was born in la Rioja. He rose in the diplomatic bureaucracy to become secretary to the Spanish ambassadors in Turin and Copenhagen. In 1788, he was named Consul General to France, and moved to Paris. At the direction of the Spanish monarch, he wrote a public letter to the Convention, pleading against the execution of Louis XVI. In early March of 1793, when France declared war on Spain, he returned home. After the 1795 Peace treaty signed at Basel, he returned to France as Spanish consul. In 1803, he was named minister general to Hamburg, and in 1803, minister plenipotentiary to Sweden. In 1804–1805, he was named minister to the Ottoman empire, but died in Varna, Bulgaria, while on his way to Constantinople.
