= LEK-8804 =

Clinical data
- Other names: LEK8804; 9,10-Didehydro-N-(2-propynyl)-6-methylergoline-8β-carboxamide; N-(2-Propynyl)ergine; N-(2-Propynyl)lysergamide
- Drug class: Serotonin receptor modulator; Serotonin 5-HT_{1A} receptor agonist; Serotonin 5-HT_{2A} receptor antagonist
- ATC code: None

Identifiers
- IUPAC name: (6aR,9R)-7-methyl-N-prop-2-ynyl-6,6a,8,9-tetrahydro-4H-indolo[4,3-fg]quinoline-9-carboxamide
- CAS Number: 153415-44-2
- PubChem CID: 11779864
- ChemSpider: 9954546
- ChEMBL: ChEMBL5618531

Chemical and physical data
- Formula: C_{19}H_{19}N_{3}O
- Molar mass: 305.381 g·mol^{−1}
- 3D model (JSmol): Interactive image
- SMILES: CN1C[C@@H](C=C2[C@H]1CC3=CNC4=CC=CC2=C34)C(=O)NCC#C
- InChI: InChI=1S/C19H19N3O/c1-3-7-20-19(23)13-8-15-14-5-4-6-16-18(14)12(10-21-16)9-17(15)22(2)11-13/h1,4-6,8,10,13,17,21H,7,9,11H2,2H3,(H,20,23)/t13-,17-/m1/s1; Key:WZTGESDWBWZMSE-CXAGYDPISA-N

LEK-8804, also known as N-(2-propynyl)lysergamide, is a serotonin receptor modulator of the lysergamide family related to the psychedelic drug LSD. It is the derivative of ergine (lysergic acid amide; LSA) with an N-(2-propynyl) substitution on the carboxamide moiety.

The drug shows affinity for the serotonin 5-HT_{1A}, 5-HT_{2A}, and 5-HT_{2C} receptors (K_{i} = 0.56–0.6 nM, 15–60 nM, and 10–80 nM, respectively). It also shows weaker affinity for dopamine and adrenergic receptors. Based on animal behavioral studies, it is thought that LEK-8804 may act as a potent serotonin 5-HT_{1A} receptor full agonist and serotonin 5-HT_{2A} receptor antagonist. For instance, it fully substitutes for the serotonin 5-HT_{1A} receptor agonist 8-OH-DPAT in rodent drug discrimination tests and produces other serotonin 5-HT_{1A} receptor agonist-like behavioral effects. The drug does not induce the head-twitch response, a behavioral proxy of serotonin 5-HT_{2A} receptor activation and psychedelic effects, in rodents. Instead, it dose-dependently inhibits 5-hydroxytryptophan (5-HTP)- and DOI-induced head twitches. On the other hand, LEK-8804 failed to substantially block the discriminative stimulus effects of DOI in rodent drug discrimination tests. These findings suggest that LEK-8804 may actually be acting merely as a serotonin 5-HT_{1A} receptor agonist without significant serotonin 5-HT_{2A} receptor antagonism.

Close analogues of LEK-8804 include LEK-8842, LEK-8829, and LEK-8841, among others.

LEK-8804 was first described in the scientific literature by 1994. It was developed by the Slovenian pharmaceutical company LEK Pharmaceuticals.

== See also ==
- Substituted lysergamide
- LEK-8842, LEK-8822, LEK-8829, LEK-8841
