= LEK-8822 =

Clinical data
- Other names: LEK8822; 9,10-Dihydro-LEK-8842; 9,10-Dihydro-N-methyl-N-(2-propynyl)lysergamide; N-Methyl-N-(2-propynyl)-6-methylergoline-8β-carboxamide
- Drug class: Monoamine receptor modulator
- ATC code: None

Identifiers
- IUPAC name: (6aR,9R,10aR)-N,7-dimethyl-N-prop-2-ynyl-6,6a,8,9,10,10a-hexahydro-4H-indolo[4,3-fg]quinoline-9-carboxamide
- PubChem CID: 101641107

Chemical and physical data
- Formula: C_{20}H_{23}N_{3}O
- Molar mass: 321.424 g·mol^{−1}
- 3D model (JSmol): Interactive image
- SMILES: CN1C[C@@H](C[C@H]2[C@H]1CC3=CNC4=CC=CC2=C34)C(=O)N(C)CC#C
- InChI: InChI=1S/C20H23N3O/c1-4-8-22(2)20(24)14-9-16-15-6-5-7-17-19(15)13(11-21-17)10-18(16)23(3)12-14/h1,5-7,11,14,16,18,21H,8-10,12H2,2-3H3/t14-,16-,18-/m1/s1; Key:ZAVOMKKGYAVBPY-QGPMSJSTSA-N

LEK-8822, also known as 9,10-dihydro-LEK-8842 or as 9,10-dihydro-N-methyl-N-(2-propynyl)lysergamide, is a monoamine receptor modulator of the lysergamide family related to 9,10-dihydro-LSD. It is the analogue of LEK-8842 in which the double bond between the 9 and 10 positions of the ergoline ring system has been dihydrogenated. The drug is a partial agonist of α-adrenergic receptors, with considerably reduced potency and efficacy compared to LEK-8842. Due to this action, LEK-8822 can produce vasoconstriction. In addition to its α-adrenergic receptor activity, LEK-8822 shows preserved affinity for but elimination of agonist activity at serotonin 5-HT_{2} receptors compared to LEK-8842. LEK-8822 was first described in the scientific literature by 1992. It was developed by the Slovenian pharmaceutical company LEK Pharmaceuticals.

== See also ==
- Substituted lysergamide
- LEK-8842 (9,10-didehydro-LEK-8822)
- LEK-8841 (2-bromo-LEK-8842)
- LEK-8829 (desoxy-LEK-8842)
- 9,10-Dihydro-LSD
