= Astrid Plessl =

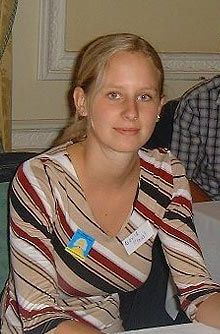
- Astrid Plessl
- Born: January 4, 1984 (age 42); Leoben, Styria, Austria
- Education: Medical University of Vienna
- Occupations: Memory sport competitor; physician; researcher
- Known for: Women's World Memory Champion (2002, 2003, 2004)

Astrid Plessl (born 4 January 1984 in Leoben, Styria) is an Austrian memory sport competitor from Mürzzuschlag. She is a former women's World Memory Champion and holds the title of Grand Master of Memory. In the early 2000s she was one of the world's leading female memory athletes, winning the women's title at the World Memory Championships in 2002, 2003 and 2004 and becoming the first woman to exceed 6,000 and later 7,000 championship points. She garnered international attention in the field in 2003 for scoring well across ten disciplines.

== Memory sport career ==
Plessl competed internationally in memory sport in the early 2000s. At the World Memory Championships she finished second among women in 2001. In 2002 she became women's world champion with 6,673 points, the first woman to pass the 6,000-point mark. She retained the women's world title in 2003, when she also placed second overall. In 2004 she won the Austrian national championship and a third women's world title, becoming the first woman to exceed 7,000 points. Her performance across the ten championship disciplines drew international press attention.

=== Records ===
Plessl set several national and personal records during her career, including memorising 302 decimal digits in five minutes, 345 words in fifteen minutes, and 72 images in one second.

== Qualifications and medical career ==
Since retiring from competitive memory sport, Plessl has pursued a career in medicine and biomedical research. She qualified as a physician in Austria in 2008, and her medical degree was recognised in Switzerland in 2012. She later gained Swiss specialist titles in general internal medicine (2015) and haematology (2016). Under the name Astrid Tschan-Plessl, she works as a haematologist at University Hospital Basel and researches natural killer cell–based immunotherapy for haematological cancers in projects funded by Swiss Cancer Research, and in collaboration with institutions, like the Institute for Cancer Research at Oslo University Hospital. .

== Awards ==
- 2003 – Josef Krainer Prize
