= TRALA-12 =

Clinical data
- Other names: TRALA12; N-Ethenyl-N-ethyllysergamide; N-Vinyl-N-ethyllysergamide; Lysergic acid ethenylethylamide; Lysergic acid vinylethylamide; N-Ethenyl-N-ethyl-6-methyl-9,10-didehydroergoline-8β-carboxamide; "Compound 2l"
- Routes of administration: Oral or intravenous
- Drug class: Serotonin receptor modulator; Serotonin 5-HT_{2} receptor agonist; Serotonin 5-HT_{2A} receptor agonist; Possible serotonergic psychedelic or hallucinogen
- ATC code: None

Identifiers
- IUPAC name: (6aR,9R)-N-ethenyl-N-ethyl-7-methyl-6,6a,8,9-tetrahydro-4H-indolo[4,3-fg]quinoline-9-carboxamide
- CAS Number: 65527-59-5
- PubChem CID: 54085403
- ChemSpider: 62838598

Chemical and physical data
- Formula: C_{20}H_{23}N_{3}O
- Molar mass: 321.424 g·mol^{−1}
- 3D model (JSmol): Interactive image
- SMILES: CCN(C=C)C(=O)[C@H]1CN([C@@H]2CC3=CNC4=CC=CC(=C34)C2=C1)C
- InChI: InChI=1S/C20H23N3O/c1-4-23(5-2)20(24)14-9-16-15-7-6-8-17-19(15)13(11-21-17)10-18(16)22(3)12-14/h4,6-9,11,14,18,21H,1,5,10,12H2,2-3H3/t14-,18-/m1/s1; Key:MQCCUHBPZPBYDB-RDTXWAMCSA-N

TRALA-12, also known as N-ethenyl-N-ethyllysergamide or as lysergic acid vinylethylamide, is a serotonin receptor modulator and possible psychedelic drug of the lysergamide family related to lysergic acid diethylamide (LSD). It is the analogue of LSD in which one of the ethyl groups on the amide has been replaced with an ethenyl (vinyl) group. Didehydro-LSD (DDH-LSD), which is structurally and pharmacologically compatible with TRALA-12, is being developed by Matthias Liechti and colleagues as a shorter-lasting LSD analogue for potential medical use.

== Pharmacology ==
=== Pharmacodynamics ===
TRALA-12 is a potent agonist of the serotonin 5-HT_{2} receptors similarly to LSD. Its affinities (K_{i}) were 0.09 nM for the serotonin 5-HT_{2A} receptor, 0.67 nM for the serotonin 5-HT_{2B} receptor, and 3.8 nM for the serotonin 5-HT_{2C} receptor. Conversely, its activational potencies and efficacies (EC_{50} (E_{max})) were 0.93 nM (79%) at the serotonin 5-HT_{2A} receptor and 1.7 nM (42%) at the serotonin 5-HT_{2B} receptor, whereas values for the serotonin 5-HT_{2C} receptor were not reported. TRALA-12 showed 19-fold higher affinity for the serotonin 5-HT_{2A} receptor than LSD, though it had only 1.5-fold higher activational potency at the receptor and had slightly lower efficacy (E_{max} = 79% and 90%, respectively). It similarly showed greatly increased affinities for the serotonin 5-HT_{2B} and 5-HT_{2C} receptors compared to LSD.

=== Pharmacokinetics ===
TRALA-12 shows dramatically faster metabolism than LSD in human liver microsomes in vitro. Whereas about 75% remained in the case of LSD following incubation after 4 hours, only about 10% of TRALA-12 remained with incubation after 1 hour. It was concluded that due to its very fast metabolism, TRALA-12 is likely not orally active, but may be active via intravenous infusion with short-lasting effects that can be rapidly terminated upon cessation of infusion.

== Chemistry ==
=== Synthesis ===
The chemical synthesis of TRALA-12 has been described.

== History ==
TRALA-12 was patented by Daniel Trachsel and Matthias Liechti and colleagues in association with MindMed (Mind Medicine; now Definium Therapeutics) in 2023.

== Research ==
An LSD analogue called didehydro-LSD (DDH-LSD), which has a name that is structurally compatible with TRALA-12, is being developed by Matthias Liechti and colleagues as a potential novel psychedelic drug for medical applications. It is described as having similar receptor activity as LSD in vitro but as having faster in-vitro metabolism and hence as potentially having a shorter duration in comparison, similarly to the case of TRALA-12. A pharmacokinetic clinical study of DDH-LSD comparing it with LSD is underway at University Hospital Basel in Basel, Switzerland as of March 2026, with both drugs given orally (following an initial dose-finding substudy in the case of DDH-LSD).

== See also ==
- Substituted lysergamide
- List of investigational hallucinogens and entactogens
- LEK-8842 (TRALA-01)
