= LEK-8829 =

Clinical data
- Other names: LEK8829; LEK-882; LEK882; Desoxy-LEK-8842; Deoxy-LEK-8842; 9,10-Didehydro-N-methyl-N-(2-propynyl)-6-methyl-8β-aminomethylergoline
- Drug class: Non-selective monoamine receptor modulator; Dopamine D_{1} receptor agonist; Dopamine D_{2} receptor antagonist; Serotonin 5-HT_{1A} receptor antagonist; Serotonin 5-HT_{2A} receptor antagonist
- ATC code: None

Identifiers
- IUPAC name: N-[[(6aR,9S)-7-methyl-6,6a,8,9-tetrahydro-4H-indolo[4,3-fg]quinolin-9-yl]methyl]-N-methylprop-2-yn-1-amine
- CAS Number: 160161-67-1
- PubChem CID: 9796528
- ChemSpider: 7972294
- CompTox Dashboard (EPA): DTXSID80166810

Chemical and physical data
- Formula: C_{20}H_{23}N_{3}
- Molar mass: 305.425 g·mol^{−1}
- 3D model (JSmol): Interactive image
- SMILES: CN1C[C@@H](C=C2[C@H]1CC3=CNC4=CC=CC2=C34)CN(C)CC#C
- InChI: InChI=1S/C20H23N3/c1-4-8-22(2)12-14-9-17-16-6-5-7-18-20(16)15(11-21-18)10-19(17)23(3)13-14/h1,5-7,9,11,14,19,21H,8,10,12-13H2,2-3H3/t14-,19+/m0/s1; Key:YBCGYAGNYOYLDH-IFXJQAMLSA-N

LEK-8829, also known as desoxy-LEK-8842, is a non-selective monoamine receptor modulator of the ergoline family related to the psychedelic drug LSD which has been studied as a potential novel antipsychotic. It is an analogue of LSD in which the oxygen atom of the carboxamide moiety has been removed to instead form an aminomethyl moiety, along with different amine substitutions (methyl and propynyl instead of diethyl).

The drug acts as a dopamine D_{1} receptor agonist, dopamine D_{2} receptor antagonist, and serotonin 5-HT_{1A} and 5-HT_{2A} receptor antagonist, among other actions. Its affinities for various receptors have been reported, including for the dopamine D_{1} receptor (K_{i} = 827 nM), dopamine D_{2} receptor (K_{i} = 37 nM), serotonin 5-HT_{1A} receptor (K_{i} = 3.9 nM), serotonin 5-HT_{2A} receptor (K_{i} = 5.4 nM), α_{1}-adrenergic receptor (K_{i} = 245 nM), and α_{2}-adrenergic receptor (K_{i} = 48 nM), among others. However, it may be more potent as a dopamine D_{1} receptor agonist in vivo. LEK-8829 produces effects in animals including hypolocomotion, sedation, catalepsy, antipsychotic-like effects, antiparkinsonian-like effects, slight vasoconstriction, increased or decreased blood pressure, and decreased heart rate. It dose-dependently inhibits 5-hydroxytryptophan (5-HTP)-induced head twitches. The drug also reduces cocaine self-administration and increases striatal opioid peptide levels, but is not self-administered itself.

Similarly to LSD, LEK-8829 is sensitive to photodegradation, rapidly decomposing into LEK-1814 (10α-hydroxy-9,10-dihydro-LEK-8829) upon direct exposure to daylight. This degradation product was several orders of magnitude less potent than LEK-8829 as a serotonin receptor antagonist. The chemical synthesis of LEK-8829 has been described. Close analogues of LEK-8829 include LEK-8804, LEK-8822, LEK-8841, and LEK-8842 (TRALA-01), among others. In contrast to LEK-8829, LEK-8804 shows serotonin 5-HT_{1A} receptor agonism and LEK-8842 shows high-efficacy serotonin 5-HT_{2A} receptor partial agonism.

LEK-8829 was first described in the scientific literature by 1994. It was developed by the Slovenian pharmaceutical company Lek Pharmaceuticals. The drug was developed and investigated for potential medical use, including treatment of schizophrenia, other forms of psychosis, parkinsonism, and drug addiction. However, it never progressed beyond the preclinical research stage of development.

== See also ==
- Substituted ergoline
- Substituted lysergamides § Related compounds
- LEK-8842 (oxo-LEK-8829)
- LEK-8822 (9,10-dihydro-LEK-8842)
- LEK-8841 (2-bromo-LEK-8842)
- Romergoline (FCE-23884)
