= Melatonergic =

A melatonergic agent (or drug) is a chemical which functions to directly modulate the melatonin system in the body or brain.

Examples include melatonin receptor agonists and melatonin receptor antagonists.

== See also ==
- Adenosinergic
- Adrenergic
- Cannabinoidergic
- Cholinergic
- Dopaminergic
- GABAergic
- Glycinergic
- Histaminergic
- Monoaminergic
- Opioidergic
- Serotonergic
