= DHEC =

DHEC may refer to:

- South Carolina Department of Health and Environmental Control, a former government agency
- Dihydroergocryptine, a pharmaceutical drug
