= 9,10-Dihydro-LSD =

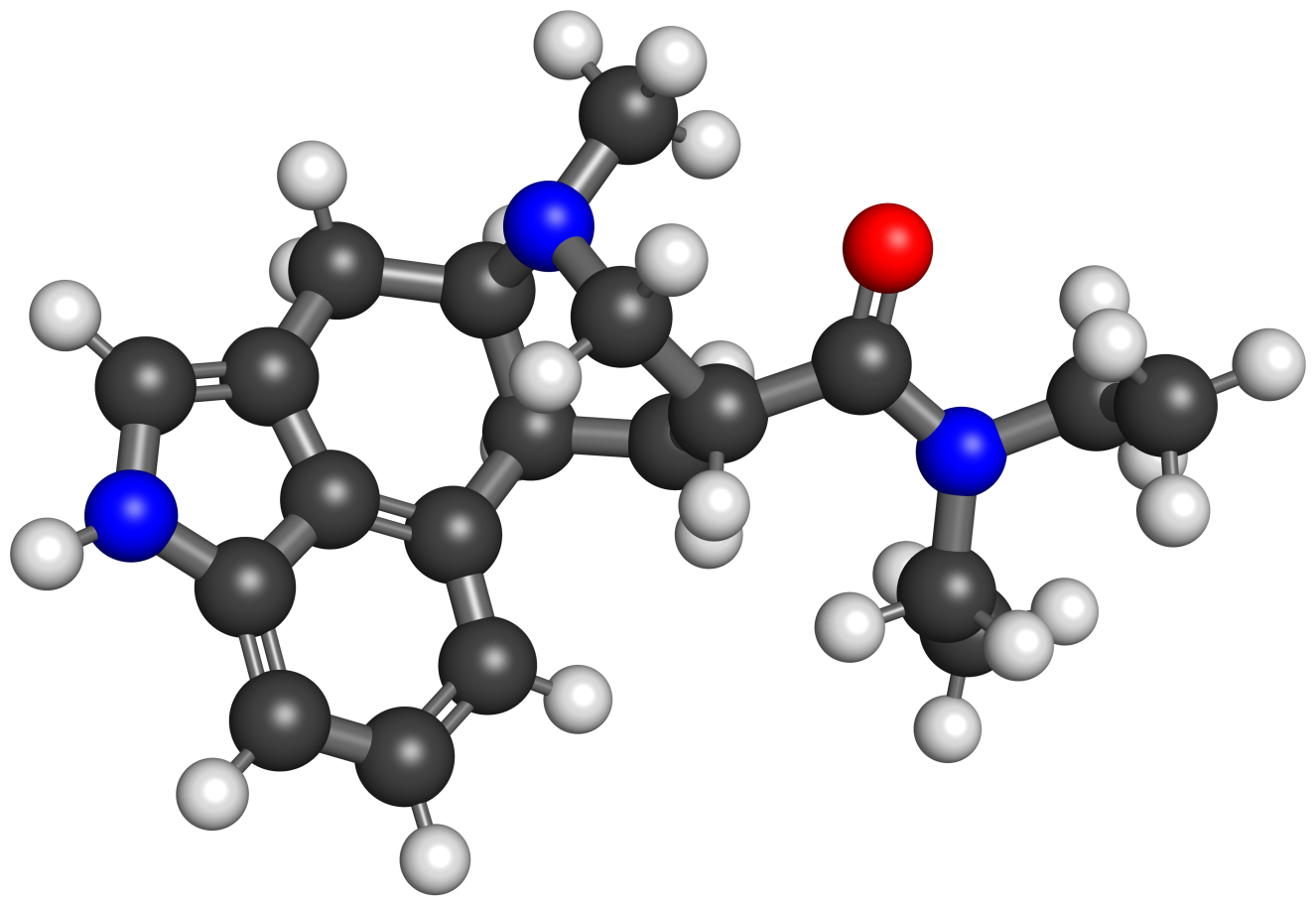

Clinical data
- Other names: 9,10-DH-LSD; 9,10-Dihydrolysergic acid diethylamide; Dihydro-LSD; DH-LSD; Dihydrolysergic acid diethylamide; (10ξ)-N,N-Diethyl-6-methylergoline-8β-carboxamide
- Routes of administration: Oral
- Drug class: Serotonin receptor modulator; Non-hallucinogenic serotonin 5-HT_{2A} receptor partial agonist
- ATC code: None

Identifiers
- IUPAC name: (6aR,9R)-N,N-diethyl-7-methyl-6,6a,8,9,10,10a-hexahydro-4H-indolo[4,3-fg]quinoline-9-carboxamide
- CAS Number: 3031-47-8
- PubChem CID: 200978
- ChemSpider: 173999
- CompTox Dashboard (EPA): DTXSID00952671

Chemical and physical data
- Formula: C_{20}H_{27}N_{3}O
- Molar mass: 325.456 g·mol^{−1}
- 3D model (JSmol): Interactive image
- SMILES: CCN(CC)C(=O)[C@@H]1CC2[C@@H](CC3=CNC4=CC=CC2=C34)N(C1)C
- InChI: InChI=1S/C20H27N3O/c1-4-23(5-2)20(24)14-9-16-15-7-6-8-17-19(15)13(11-21-17)10-18(16)22(3)12-14/h6-8,11,14,16,18,21H,4-5,9-10,12H2,1-3H3/t14-,16?,18-/m1/s1; Key:XNARQIIKDPXTHC-OXPKRCOGSA-N

9,10-Dihydro-LSD, or 9,10-DH-LSD, also known simply as dihydro-LSD (DH-LSD) or as 9,10-dihydrolysergic acid diethylamide, is a non-hallucinogenic serotonin receptor modulator of the lysergamide family related to lysergic acid diethylamide (LSD). It is the analogue of LSD in which the 9,10- double bond in the D ring of the ergoline ring system has been hydrogenated.

== Use and effects ==
9,10-Dihydro-LSD has been found to be inactive in terms of psychedelic effects in humans. Whereas LSD is active at an oral dose of 1 μg/kg (70 μg for a 70-kg person), 9,10-dihydro-LSD was said to be inactive orally at doses of up to 50 μg/kg (3.5 mg for a 70-kg person). As such, 9,10-dihydro-LSD does not appear to produce psychedelic effects at doses of up to 50 times the effective doses of LSD, demonstrating less than 2% of the potency of LSD in this regard. Another source stated it to have 0% of the psychedelic potency of LSD. Despite its lack of psychedelic effects however, 9,10-dihydro-LSD at doses of 100 to 200 μg orally has nonetheless been reported to produce strong autonomic effects in humans, including nausea, emesis, tachycardia, shivering, polyuria, headache, and paresthesias.

== Toxicity ==
The LD_{50} of 9,10-dihydro-LSD given intravenously in mice is 56 mg/kg.

== Pharmacology ==
=== Pharmacodynamics ===
9,10-Dihydro-LSD has been shown to bind to the serotonin 5-HT_{2A}, 5-HT_{2C}, and 5-HT_{1A} receptors. It acts as a partial agonist of the serotonin 5-HT_{2A} receptor similarly to LSD, whereas functional activities at the other serotonin receptors were not reported. At the serotonin 5-HT_{2A} receptor, 9,10-dihydro-LSD's affinity (K_{0.5}) was 2.9 nM (compared to 1.08 nM for LSD), whereas its activational potency (EC_{50}) in terms of calcium release was 3,840 nM and its intrinsic activity (E_{max}) was 58% (relative to 595 nM and 55% for LSD, respectively). Hence, 9,10-dihydro-LSD had about 2.7-fold lower affinity and 6-fold lower activational potency at the receptor compared to LSD, whereas its activational efficacy in terms of calcium release was about the same. At the serotonin 5-HT_{2C} and 5-HT_{1A} receptors, 9,10-dihydro-LSD showed 4.6-fold and 26-fold lower affinities than those of LSD, respectively.

In earlier studies, 9,10-dihydro-LSD showed 52% of the serotonin antagonist activity of LSD in the isolated rat uterus in vitro. It was reported to have failed to produce the autonomic or sympathomimetic effects typical of LSD and related psychedelics in animals, such as mydriasis, piloerection, and hyperthermia, although it did produce hypothermia.

== Chemistry ==
=== Synthesis ===
The chemical synthesis of 9,10-dihydro-LSD has been described.

=== Analogues ===
A number of analogues and derivatives of 9,10-dihydro-LSD are known, for instance dihydroergotoxine, a mixture of dihydroergocornine, dihydroergocristine, and dihydroergocryptine, and dihydroergotamine. Various 9,10-dihydrolysergamides are known to be very potent α-adrenergic antagonists, to have almost no effects on the uterus (i.e., no oxytocic activity), and to have markedly reduced central effects. Dihydroergotoxine has been used to treat vascular disorders and essential hypertension, but has largely been discontinued. Other 9,10-Dihydrolysergamides have shown emetic activity. They often have comparable antiserotonergic activity relative to the saturated analogues. In general, 9,10-dihydrolysergamides are said to be devoid of hallucinogenic activity.

== History ==
9,10-Dihydro-LSD was first described in the scientific literature by at least the 1950s.

== See also ==
- Substituted lysergamide
- AWD 52-39
- 2,3-Dihydro-LSD
- Lumi-LSD (10-hydroxy-9,10-dihydro-LSD)
