= C19H19N3O =

The molecular formula C_{19}H_{19}N_{3}O (molar mass: 305.381 g/mol) may refer to:

- BP 2.94
- LEK-8804
