= LEK-8841 =

Clinical data
- Other names: LEK8841; 2-Bromo-LEK-8842; N-Methyl-N-(2-propynyl)-2-bromolysergamide; 9,10-Didehydro-N-methyl-N-(2-propynyl)-2-bromo-6-methylergoline-8β-carboxamide
- Drug class: Monoamine receptor modulator; Antipsychotic
- ATC code: None

Identifiers
- IUPAC name: (6aR,9R)-5-bromo-N,7-dimethyl-N-prop-2-ynyl-6,6a,8,9-tetrahydro-4H-indolo[4,3-fg]quinoline-9-carboxamide
- PubChem CID: 9935483
- ChemSpider: 8111111

Chemical and physical data
- Formula: C_{20}H_{20}BrN_{3}O
- Molar mass: 398.304 g·mol^{−1}
- 3D model (JSmol): Interactive image
- SMILES: CN1C[C@@H](C=C2[C@H]1CC3=C(NC4=CC=CC2=C34)Br)C(=O)N(C)CC#C
- InChI: InChI=1S/C20H20BrN3O/c1-4-8-23(2)20(25)12-9-14-13-6-5-7-16-18(13)15(19(21)22-16)10-17(14)24(3)11-12/h1,5-7,9,12,17,22H,8,10-11H2,2-3H3/t12-,17-/m1/s1; Key:RUQRANSTJDHVEB-SJKOYZFVSA-N

LEK-8841, also known as N-methyl-N-(2-propynyl)-2-bromolysergamide or as 2-bromo-LEK-8842, is a monoamine receptor modulator of the lysergamide family related to 2-bromo-LSD. It is the 2-bromo derivative of LEK-8842.

The drug shows affinity for serotonin 5-HT_{2} and α_{1}-adrenergic receptors (K_{i} = 16.3 nM at 5-HT_{2}) and acts as a silent antagonist of these receptors (A_{2} = 11.7 nM and 355 nM, respectively), with activity described as qualitatively similar to that of ketanserin but with greater selectivity for serotonin 5-HT_{2} receptors over α_{1}-adrenergic receptors. However, LEK-8841 was also subsequently found to interact with the dopamine D_{1} and D_{2} receptors (K_{i} = 360 nM and 11.3 nM, respectively). The drug inhibits apomorphine-induced hyperlocomotion and climbing behavior, induces catalepsy, inhibits the 5-hydroxytryptophan (5-HTP)-induced head twitch response, and produces hypotension in rodents.

LEK-8841 was first described in the scientific literature by 1992. It was developed by the Slovenian pharmaceutical company LEK Pharmaceuticals. The drug has been suggested as a potential clinically effective antipsychotic for medical use. Based on ratio of dopamine D_{2} receptor antagonism to serotonin 5-HT_{2} receptor antagonism, it is said to appear more like a typical than atypical antipsychotic.

== See also ==
- Substituted lysergamide
- LEK-8842, LEK-8829, LEK-8822
- BOL-148 (2-bromo-LSD)
