= Histaminergic =

Substance related to histamine functions

Histaminergic means "working on the histamine system", and histaminic means "related to histamine".

A histaminergic agent (or drug) is a chemical which functions to directly modulate the histamine system in the body or brain. Examples include histamine receptor agonists and histamine receptor antagonists (or antihistamines). Subdivisions of histamine antagonists include H_{1} receptor antagonists, H_{2} receptor antagonists, and H_{3} receptor antagonists.

== See also ==
- Adenosinergic
- Adrenergic
- Cannabinoidergic
- Cholinergic
- Dopaminergic
- GABAergic
- Glycinergic
- Melatonergic
- Monoaminergic
- Opioidergic
- Serotonergic
