= Opioidergic =

Classification of chemicals that directly modulate opioid neuropeptide systems

Structural correlation between met-enkephalin, an opioid peptide, (left) and morphine, an opiate drug, (right)

An opioidergic agent (or drug) is a chemical which directly or indirectly modulate the function of opioid receptors. Opioidergics comprise opioids, as well as allosteric modulators and enzyme affecting agents like enkephalinase inhibitors.

== Allosteric modulators ==
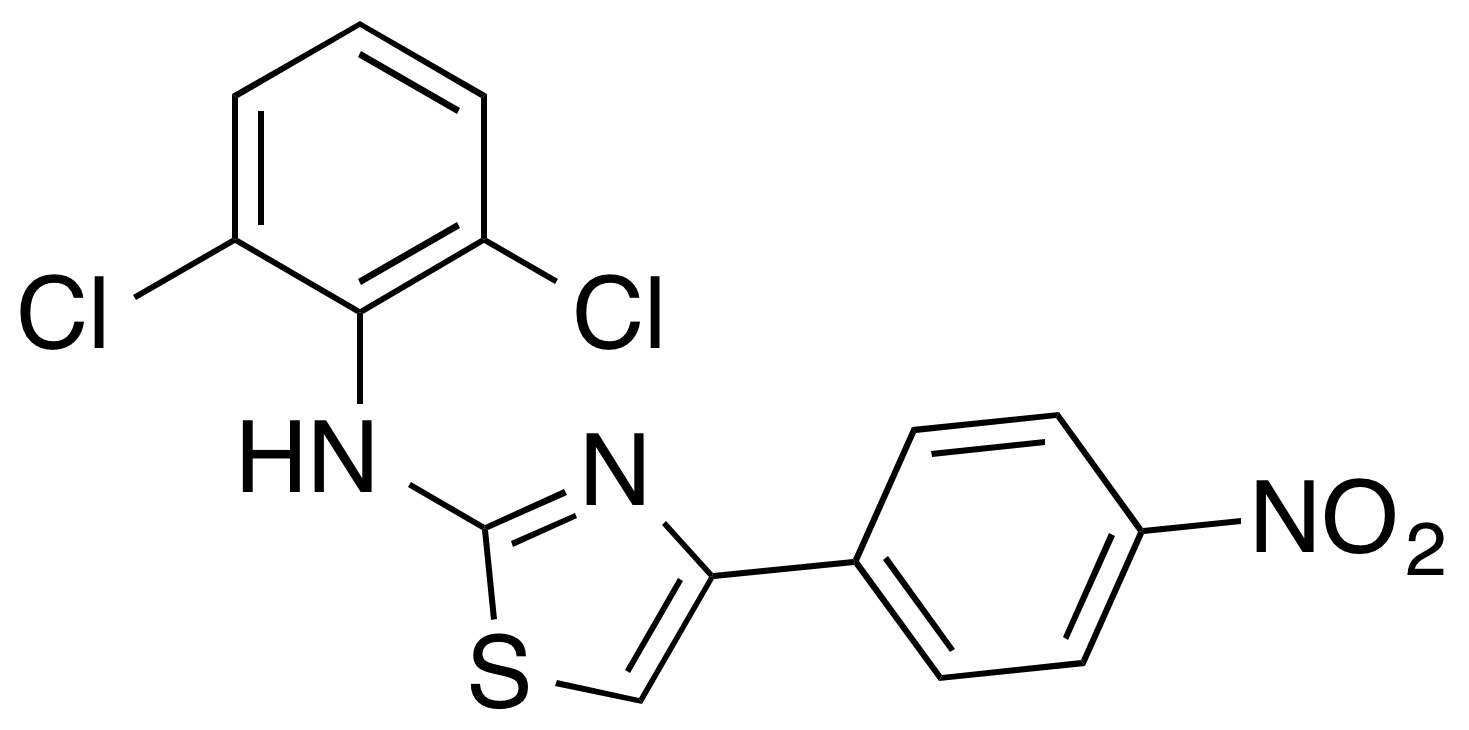
BMS-986121

- BMS-986121: μ-PAM
- BMS-986122: μ-PAM
- BPRMU191: confers agonistic properties to small-molecule morphinan antagonists
- Ignavine
- Oxytocin: μ-PAM
- δ-PAM (see reference)
- Cannabidiol
- Tetrahydrocannabinol
- Sodium (Na^{+})

== See also ==
- List of opioids
- Adenosinergic
- Adrenergic
- Cannabinoidergic
- Cholinergic
- Dopaminergic
- GABAergic
- Glycinergic
- Histaminergic
- Melatonergic
- Monoaminergic
- Serotonergic
