= Matthias Liechti =

Swiss scientist and physician

- Born: May 27, 1970 (age 56); Zurich, Switzerland
- Education: University Hospital of Zurich, University of California San Diego, Scripps Research, University Hospital Basel
- Occupation: Academic
- Years active: 1998–present
- Organization(s): University Hospital Basel, MindMed
- Known for: Studying psychedelics, entactogens, and other psychoactive drugs
- Website: biomedizin.unibas.ch/en/persons/liechti-matthias-emanuel/ universe.unibas.ch/org-units/94/research-groups/166/overview biomedizin.unibas.ch/en/research/research-groups/liechti-lab/

Matthias Emanuel Liechti (born 27 May 1970) is a Swiss scientist and physician who studies psychedelics, entactogens, and other psychoactive drugs. He is the head of the Liechti Lab at the University of Basel in Switzerland. The lab conducts in-vitro research, animal studies, and clinical studies of psychoactive drugs. They have conducted clinical studies of drugs including LSD, psilocybin, mescaline, dimethyltryptamine (DMT), and MDMA. The lab also characterizes novel psychoactive substances (designer drugs).

Liechti is a professor of clinical pharmacology and internal medicine and an attending physician at the University of Basel. He attended and underwent training at the University of California, San Diego and the University Hospital of Zurich, among other institutions.

In April 2020, the Liechti Lab entered an agreement and long-term partnership with the psychedelic pharmaceutical company MindMed such that MindMed would have exclusive rights to the lab's data, compounds, and patent rights. One such project is a psychedelic "neutralizer" technology that can abort or shorten a psychedelic experience.

Uniquely in Europe, certain psychedelics and entactogens including LSD, psilocybin, and MDMA have been legal for medical use in Switzerland, where Liechti and his lab are based, since 2014.

== Selected publications ==
- Vollenweider FX, Gamma A, Liechti M, Huber T (October 1998). "Psychological and cardiovascular effects and short-term sequelae of MDMA ("ecstasy") in MDMA-naïve healthy volunteers". Neuropsychopharmacology. 19 (4): 241–251. doi:10.1016/S0893-133X(98)00013-X. PMID 9718588.
- Liechti ME, Vollenweider FX (December 2001). "Which neuroreceptors mediate the subjective effects of MDMA in humans? A summary of mechanistic studies". Hum Psychopharmacol. 16 (8): 589–598. doi:10.1002/hup.348. PMID 12404538.
- Liechti M (2015). "Novel psychoactive substances (designer drugs): overview and pharmacology of modulators of monoamine signaling". Swiss Med Wkly. 145: w14043. doi:10.4414/smw.2015.14043. PMID 25588018.
- Rickli A, Luethi D, Reinisch J, Buchy D, Hoener MC, Liechti ME (December 2015). "Receptor interaction profiles of novel N-2-methoxybenzyl (NBOMe) derivatives of 2,5-dimethoxy-substituted phenethylamines (2C drugs)". Neuropharmacology. 99: 546–53. doi:10.1016/j.neuropharm.2015.08.034. PMID 26318099.
- Rickli A, Moning OD, Hoener MC, Liechti ME (August 2016). "Receptor interaction profiles of novel psychoactive tryptamines compared with classic hallucinogens". Eur Neuropsychopharmacol. 26 (8): 1327–37. doi:10.1016/j.euroneuro.2016.05.001. PMID 27216487.
- Preller KH, Herdener M, Pokorny T, Planzer A, Kraehenmann R, Stämpfli P, Liechti ME, Seifritz E, Vollenweider FX (February 2017). "The Fabric of Meaning and Subjective Effects in LSD-Induced States Depend on Serotonin 2A Receptor Activation". Curr Biol. 27 (3): 451–457. Bibcode:2017CBio...27..451P. doi:10.1016/j.cub.2016.12.030. PMID 28132813.
- Liechti ME (October 2017). "Modern Clinical Research on LSD". Neuropsychopharmacology. 42 (11): 2114–2127. doi:10.1038/npp.2017.86. PMC 5603820. PMID 28447622.
- Simmler LD, Liechti ME (2018). "Pharmacology of MDMA- and Amphetamine-Like New Psychoactive Substances". Handb Exp Pharmacol. Handbook of Experimental Pharmacology. 252: 143–164. doi:10.1007/164_2018_113. ISBN 978-3-030-10560-0. PMID 29633178.
- Luethi D, Liechti ME (April 2020). "Designer drugs: mechanism of action and adverse effects". Arch Toxicol. 94 (4): 1085–1133. Bibcode:2020ArTox..94.1085L. doi:10.1007/s00204-020-02693-7. PMC 7225206. PMID 32249347.
- Ley L, Holze F, Arikci D, Becker AM, Straumann I, Klaiber A, Coviello F, Dierbach S, Thomann J, Duthaler U, Luethi D, Varghese N, Eckert A, Liechti ME (October 2023). "Comparative acute effects of mescaline, lysergic acid diethylamide, and psilocybin in a randomized, double-blind, placebo-controlled cross-over study in healthy participants". Neuropsychopharmacology. 48 (11): 1659–1667. doi:10.1038/s41386-023-01607-2. PMC 10517157. PMID 37231080.
- Straumann I, Ley L, Holze F, Becker AM, Klaiber A, Wey K, Duthaler U, Varghese N, Eckert A, Liechti ME (December 2023). "Acute effects of MDMA and LSD co-administration in a double-blind placebo-controlled study in healthy participants". Neuropsychopharmacology. 48 (13): 1840–1848. doi:10.1038/s41386-023-01609-0. PMC 10584820. PMID 37258715.
- Holze F, Singh N, Liechti ME, D'Souza DC (May 2024). "Serotonergic Psychedelics: A Comparative Review of Efficacy, Safety, Pharmacokinetics, and Binding Profile". Biol Psychiatry Cogn Neurosci Neuroimaging. 9 (5): 472–489. doi:10.1016/j.bpsc.2024.01.007. PMID 38301886.
- Vogt SB, Liechti ME (2025). "Clinical Pharmacology". In Nutt DJ, Thurgur H (eds.). Psychedelics in Psychiatry. International Review of Neurobiology. Vol. 181. London: Academic Press. pp. 99–148. doi:10.1016/bs.irn.2025.02.003. ISBN 9780443343865. PMID 40541320.
- Kolaczynska, Karolina E.; Trachsel, Daniel; Hoener, Marius C.; Liechti, Matthias E.; Luethi, Dino (20 November 2025). "Receptor interaction profiles of 4-alkoxy-2,6-dimethoxyphenethylamines (Ψ derivatives) and related amphetamines". Frontiers in Pharmacology. 16. doi:10.3389/fphar.2025.1703480. ISSN 1663-9812.

== See also ==
- Daniel Trachsel
- Andrew Gallimore
- Matthew J. Baggott
- TRALA-12 (likely didehydro-LSD or DDH-LSD)
