= Cannabinoidergic =

Working on the endocannabinoid neurotransmitters

Cannabinoidergic, or cannabinergic, means "working on the endocannabinoid neurotransmitters". As with terms such as dopaminergic and serotonergic, related proteins and cellular components involved in endocannabinoid signaling, such as the cannabinoid (CB_{1}) receptor, as well as exogenous compounds, such as phytocannabinoids or other cannabinoids which modulate the activity of endocannabinoid system, can be described as cannabinoidergic.

== See also ==
- Adenosinergic
- Adrenergic
- Cholinergic
- Dopaminergic
- GABAergic
- Glycinergic
- Histaminergic
- Melatonergic
- Monoaminergic
- Opioidergic
- Serotonergic
