= Definium Therapeutics =

Psychedelic medicine biotech company

Definium Therapeutics, Inc.
- Formerly: Mind Medicine Inc. / MindMed
- Type: Public
- Traded as: Nasdaq: DFTX
- ISIN: CA60255C8850
- Industry: Biotechnology; Mental health
- Founded: May 2019; 7 years ago, in Toronto, Canada
- Founder: Jamon "JR" Rahn; Stephen Hurst; Scott Freeman; Leonard Latchman
- Headquarters: New York, U.S.
- Area served: Worldwide
- Key people: Robert Barrow (CEO); Daniel R Karlin, MD, MA (CMO)
- Services: Drug development; Psychedelic research; Psychedelic assisted therapy
- Number of employees: 57
- Subsidiaries: MindMed Discover (Basel, Switzerland); MindMed Pty Ltd. (Perth, Western Australia)
- Website: definiumtx.com

Definium Therapeutics, Inc., formerly known as MindMed, is a New York-based biotechnology company that is currently developing clinical and therapeutic applications for psychedelic and, more broadly, psychoplastogenic drugs.

== History ==
MindMed was founded in May 2019 by Stephen Hurst and Jamon Rahn.

MindMed initially focused on developing treatments for opioid withdrawal and opioid use disorder with 18-MC, a non-hallucinogenic molecule based on the psychoactive alkaloid ibogaine. In June 2019, it acquired the 18-MC drug development program, previously funded by the National Institute on Drug Abuse, and in September began to prepare 18-MC for a Phase I FDA clinical trial to enable further clinical trials targeting opioid withdrawal and opioid use disorder.

MindMed was the first psychedelic pharmaceutical company to go public, listing on the Canadian NEO Exchange in March of 2020 through a reverse takeover with the Canadian gold mining company Broadway Gold Mining. It began trading on the Nasdaq as MNMD in April 2021 after being approved for an uplisting from the OTC Markets.

In a press release on June 9, 2021 MindMed announced that Jamon Rahn was stepping down both as the CEO and as a director on the board, to be replaced by then CDO Robert Barrow.

On February 26, 2021, MindMed closed its acquisition of digital health startup HealthMode. In connection with the acquisition, Daniel Karlin MD, CEO of HealthMode, was appointed to the position of CMO of the company.

On August 25, 2022, the first patient was dosed in a phase 2b trial for treatment of MM120 (now DT120) in generalized anxiety disorder (GAD). The study would go on to recruit 198 participants. The majority of trial participants experienced statistically significant improvements in their GAD scores, leading to the approval of multiple phase three human trials.

On January 12, 2026, MindMed rebranded to Definium Therapeutics.

== Research ==
In March 2020, MindMed announced that it had partnered with NYU Langone to launch a clinical training program to train psychiatrists in psychedelic therapies and research to advance and deploy psychedelic medicines. The company committed $5 million to establish the center, which will also explore 18-MC and the use of drugs, including psilocybin-assisted therapy for alcohol use disorder.

In April 2020, the company entered into a long-term partnership with University Hospital Basel's Liechti Lab, gaining rights to more than ten years of the lab's data related to LSD, MDMA, and other psychedelic substances. The development of a novel compound designed to shorten the duration or stop an LSD experience that would allow LSD to be more widely used in a therapeutic environment was subsequently announced. Later that year a clinical trial studying the effects of DMT, the primary psychoactive ingredient in ayahuasca, and clinical trials combining MDMA and LSD were announced. A study to better understand and compare the altered states of consciousness induced by psilocybin and LSD began in August 2020, and in October a Phase 1 study at the Liechti Lab on the acute dose dependent effects of LSD was completed. The results of the study were published by the American College of Neuropsychopharmacology in the journal Neuropsychopharmacology. In September 2021, further results were presented by Matthias Liechti, head of the Liechti Lab, at the INSIGHT Conference in Berlin. The results included the first clinical evidence on the comparative effects of LSD and psilocybin, stating 100mcg of LSD produced the same acute perceptual effects as a dose of 20 mg of psilocybin in healthy volunteers. Additionally, psilocybin taken after administering antidepressants for two weeks prior, was deemed safe, as well as reduced anxiety and blood pressure without hindering the psychedelic experience.

In December 2020, MindMed entered into an investigator-sponsored study agreement with Maastricht University in the Netherlands. The university provided facilities and personnel for a Phase 1 study to evaluate the effects of two low doses of LSD on mood, sleep and neuroplasticity.

In March 2024, the FDA granted breakthrough therapy designation to MindMed's form of LSD (MM120; now DT120) for the treatment of generalized anxiety disorder. This decision was influenced by a drug trial in which approximately half of the participants experienced significant relief from their symptoms. Positive results in clinical trials against general depression symptoms and generalized anxiety disorder were reported in 2026.

=== Ongoing clinical trials ===
Trial Name	Disorder	Product	Status	Location
Ascend: A Phase 3 Multicenter, Randomized, Double-blind, Placebo-controlled, 12-Week Study (Part A) With a 40-Week Open-label Extension (Part B) Evaluating the Efficacy and Safety of Oral DT120 Compared to Placebo in the Treatment of Adults With Major Depressive Disorder	Major Depressive Disorder (MDD)	DT120	Actively Recruiting	USA (Multiple Sites)
Emerge: A Phase 3, Multicenter, Randomized, Double-blind, Placebo-controlled, 12-week Study (part A) with a 40-week Open-label Extension (part B) Evaluating the Efficacy and Safety of Oral DT120 Compared to Placebo in the Treatment of Adults	Major Depressive Disorder (MDD)	DT120	Active, not recruiting	USA (Multiple Sites)
Panorama: A Phase 3, Multicenter, Randomized, Double-blind, Placebo-controlled, 12-week Study (part A) with a 40-week Open-label Extension (part B) Evaluating the Efficacy and Safety of Oral DT120 Compared to Placebo in the Treatment of Adults	Generalized Anxiety Disorder (GAD)	DT120	Active, not recruiting	USA (Multiple Sites); Europe (Multiple Sites)
Voyage: A Phase 3, Multicenter, Randomized, Double-blind, Placebo-controlled, 12-week Study (part A) with a 40-week Open-label Extension (part B) Evaluating the Efficacy and Safety of Oral DT120 Compared to Placebo in the Treatment of Adults	Generalized Anxiety Disorder (GAD)	DT120	Active, not recruiting	USA (Multiple Sites)
A Phase 2a Trial of DT402 for Autism Spectrum Disorder	Autism Spectrum Disorder (ASD)	DT402	Actively Recruiting	USA (Multiple Sites)

== See also ==
- List of psychedelic pharmaceutical companies
- List of investigational hallucinogens and entactogens
- TRALA-12 (likely didehydro-LSD or DDH-LSD)
