= AWD 52-39 =

Clinical data
- Other names: AWD-5239; AWD5239; N,N-Diacetoxyethyl-9,10-dihydrolysergamide
- Routes of administration: Unknown
- Drug class: Nootropic; Serotonin receptor modulator; Serotonin 5-HT_{2} receptor antagonist
- ATC code: None

Identifiers
- IUPAC name: 2-[2-acetyloxyethyl-[(6aR,9R)-7-methyl-6,6a,8,9,10,10a-hexahydro-4H-indolo[4,3-fg]quinoline-9-carbonyl]amino]ethyl acetate
- CAS Number: 109002-91-7
- PubChem CID: 130983
- ChemSpider: 115824
- CompTox Dashboard (EPA): DTXSID40910957

Chemical and physical data
- Formula: C_{24}H_{31}N_{3}O_{5}
- Molar mass: 441.528 g·mol^{−1}
- 3D model (JSmol): Interactive image
- SMILES: CC(=O)OCCN(CCOC(=O)C)C(=O)[C@@H]1CC2[C@@H](CC3=CNC4=CC=CC2=C34)N(C1)C
- InChI: InChI=1S/C24H31N3O5/c1-15(28)31-9-7-27(8-10-32-16(2)29)24(30)18-11-20-19-5-4-6-21-23(19)17(13-25-21)12-22(20)26(3)14-18/h4-6,13,18,20,22,25H,7-12,14H2,1-3H3/t18-,20?,22-/m1/s1; Key:LXWNLFQDQZPCPP-HCNFZCTASA-N

AWD 52-39, or AWD-5239, also known as N,N-diacetoxyethyl-9,10-dihydrolysergamide, is a drug described as a "nootropic" (cognitive enhancer) of the lysergamide family related to lysergic acid diethylamide (LSD) that was never marketed. It was under development by Arzneimittelwerk Dresden, but development was discontinued. The effects of AWD 52-39 in preclinical studies have been reported. It has been described as a serotonin 5-HT_{2} receptor antagonist. The drug has been found to enhance learning and memory and to produce antidepressant-like effects in rodents. It appears to act upon vascular serotonin receptors. The chemical synthesis and stereochemistry of AWD 52-39 have been described. The drug was first described in the scientific literature by 1989. It reached phase 2 clinical trials for the treatment of cognition disorders prior to the discontinuation of its development.

== See also ==
- Substituted lysergamide
- List of investigational cognition and memory disorder drugs
- 9,10-Dihydro-LSD
- Nicergoline
- Dihydroergotoxine
- Romergoline
