= 2,3-Dihydro-LSD =

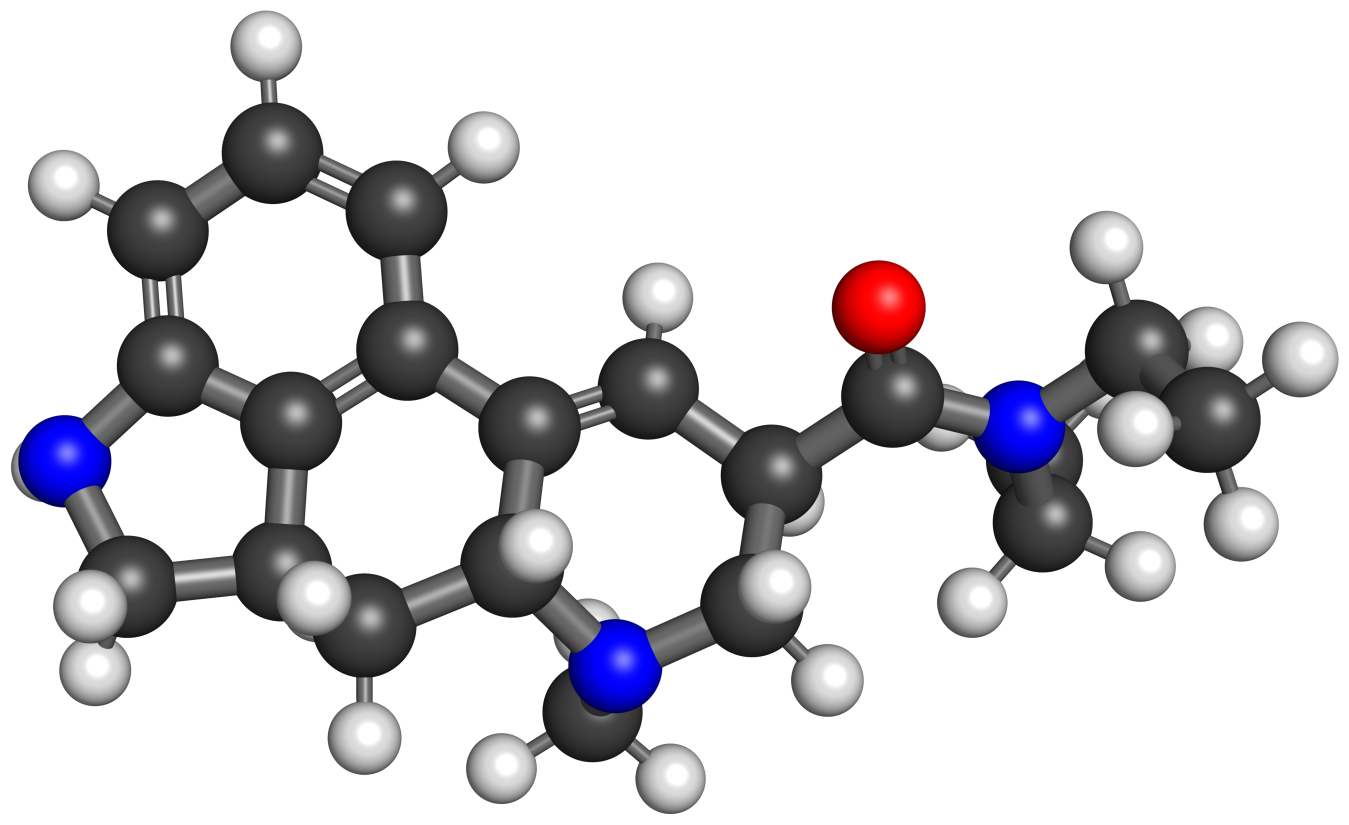

Clinical data
- Other names: 2,3-DH-LSD; DH-LSD; 2,3-Dihydrolysergic acid diethylamide; N,N-Diethyl-6-methyl-9,10-didehydro-2,3-dihydroergoline-8β-carboxamide
- Routes of administration: Oral
- Drug class: Serotonergic psychedelic; Hallucinogen
- ATC code: None

Identifiers
- IUPAC name: (6aR,9R)-N,N-diethyl-7-methyl-5,5a,6,6a,8,9-hexahydro-4H-indolo[4,3-fg]quinoline-9-carboxamide
- CAS Number: None
- PubChem CID: 53947245
- ChemSpider: 67024742

Chemical and physical data
- Formula: C_{20}H_{27}N_{3}O
- Molar mass: 325.456 g·mol^{−1}
- 3D model (JSmol): Interactive image
- SMILES: CCN(CC)C(=O)[C@H]1CN([C@@H]2CC3CNC4=CC=CC(=C34)C2=C1)C
- InChI: InChI=1S/C20H27N3O/c1-4-23(5-2)20(24)14-9-16-15-7-6-8-17-19(15)13(11-21-17)10-18(16)22(3)12-14/h6-9,13-14,18,21H,4-5,10-12H2,1-3H3/t13?,14-,18-/m1/s1; Key:JBWYWLQLZXGQJF-JDPNFYKBSA-N

2,3-Dihydro-LSD, or 2,3-DH-LSD, also known as 2,3-dihydrolysergic acid diethylamide, is a psychedelic drug of the lysergamide family related to lysergic acid diethylamide (LSD). It is the analogue of LSD in which the 2,3- double bond in the indole ring within the ergoline ring system has been hydrogenated.

== Use and effects ==
The drug produces similar autonomic and psychoactive effects as LSD in humans, although its hallucinogenic effects are less pronounced. It has been found to possess about one-sixth to one-eighth (i.e., ~15% overall) of the potency of LSD in inducing mydriasis (pupil dilation) and psychedelic effects, respectively, in humans. More specifically, 2,3-dihydro-LSD is psychedelic at doses of 3.0 to 4.5 μg/kg (210–315 μg for a 70-kg person), while LSD is hallucinogenic at doses of 0.5 to 1.0 μg/kg (35–70 μg for a 70-kg person).

In addition to its greatly reduced potency compared to LSD, 2,3-dihydro-LSD has a delayed onset and time to peak effects relative to LSD. The duration of 2,3-dihydro-LSD was roughly 8 to 12 hours and was longer than that of LSD (which had a duration of about 7 hours in the study) as well.

== Pharmacology ==
=== Pharmacodynamics ===
In rabbits, 2,3-dihydro-LSD had about 4% (1/25th) of the potency of LSD in inducing hyperthermia, while in mice, it was "equally toxic" (presumably referring to LD_{50}) as LSD.

=== Pharmacokinetics ===
It is possible that 2,3-dihydro-LSD may function as a prodrug and aromatize/dehydrogenate into LSD or metabolize into another active metabolite in vivo. Relatedly, 2,3-dihydroindoles can be fairly readily aromatized into indoles, and 2,3-dihydro-LSD has been detected as a metabolite of radiolabeled LSD in the isolated perfused rat liver in vitro, supporting the possibility of interconversion between the two compounds. Alternatively, 2,3-dihydro-LSD might be absorbed more slowly or penetrate the blood–brain barrier more gradually than LSD.

== History ==
2,3-Dihydro-LSD was first described in the scientific literature by Charles Gorodetzky and Harris Isbell at the Addiction Research Center of the National Institute of Mental Health (subsequently part of the National Institute on Drug Abuse) by 1964. However, it had first been synthesized and studied in animals by Botand Berde and Rudolph Bircher at Sandoz Pharmaceuticals, but their findings were unpublished. Sandoz Pharmaceuticals supplied the 2,3-dihydro-LSD used by Gorodetzky and Isbell in their clinical study.

== See also ==
- Substituted lysergamide
- 9,10-Dihydro-LSD
- 2-Oxo-LSD
- 2-Oxo-3-hydroxy-LSD
