= Adenosinergic =

Adenosinergic means "working on adenosine".

An adenosinergic agent (or drug) is a chemical which functions to directly modulate the adenosine system in the body or brain. Examples include adenosine receptor agonists, adenosine receptor antagonists (such as caffeine), and adenosine reuptake inhibitors.

An adenosine antagonist has the opposite effects, but also modulates adenosine; caffeine is the best known example. Caffeine, which is "the most widely consumed psychoactive substance", "confers neuroprotection" in Parkinson's disease.

== See also ==
- Adrenergic
- Cannabinoidergic
- Cholinergic
- Dopaminergic
- GABAergic
- Glycinergic
- Histaminergic
- Melatonergic
- Monoaminergic
- Opioidergic
- Serotonergic
