= Glycinergic =

Class of chemical compounds

A glycinergic agent (or drug) is a chemical which functions to directly modulate the glycine system in the body or brain. Examples include glycine receptor agonists, glycine receptor antagonists, and glycine reuptake inhibitors.

== See also ==
- Adenosinergic
- Adrenergic
- Cannabinoidergic
- Cholinergic
- Dopaminergic
- GABAergic
- Histaminergic
- Melatonergic
- Monoaminergic
- Opioidergic
- Serotonergic
