= Peace of Basel =

1795 set of treaties during the War of the First Coalition

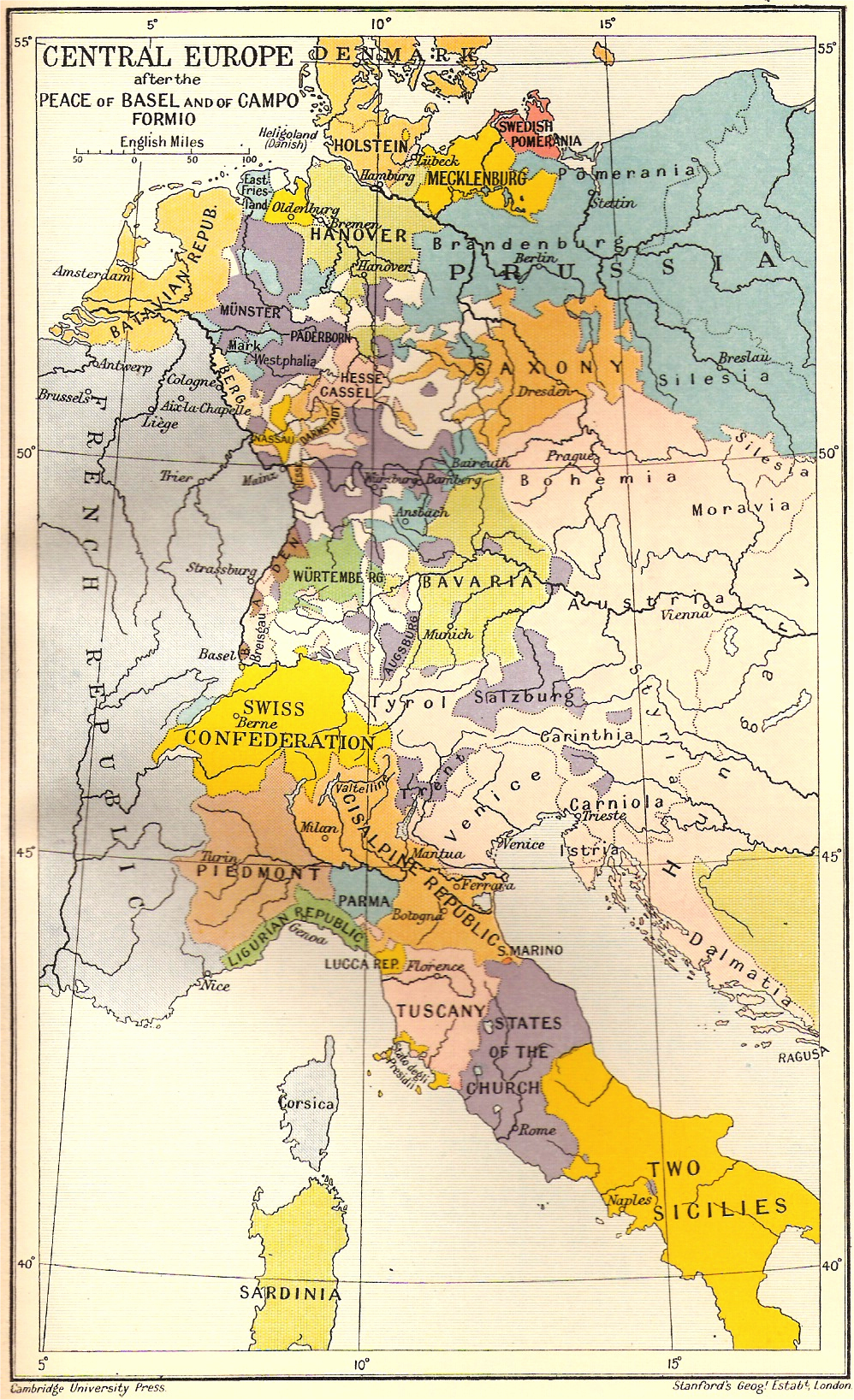
- Map shows Central Europe after the Peace of Basel and the Treaty of Campo Formio.
- Context: End of the War of the First Coalition between France and Prussia, France and Spain, France and Hesse-Kassel
- Signed: 1795
- Location: Basel, Old Swiss Confederation
- Signatories: (France) French First Republic; Kingdom of Prussia; Kingdom of Spain; Landgraviate of Hesse-Kassel

The Peace of Basel of 1795 consists of three peace treaties involving France during the French Revolution (represented by François de Barthélemy).

- The first was with Prussia (represented by Karl August von Hardenberg) on 5 April;
- The second was with Spain (represented by Domingo d'Yriarte) on 22 July, ending the War of the Pyrenees; and
- The third was with the Landgraviate of Hesse-Kassel (represented by Friedrich Sigismund Waitz von Eschen) on 28 August, concluding the stage of the French Revolutionary Wars against the First Coalition.

With great diplomatic cunning, the treaties enabled France to placate and divide its enemies of the First Coalition, one by one. Thereafter, Revolutionary France emerged as a major European power.

== Treaty between France and Prussia ==
The first treaty, on 5 April 1795 between France and Prussia, had been under discussion since 1794. Prussia withdrew from the coalition that had been working on the impending partition of Poland and, when it was appropriate, withdrew its troops aligned against Austria and Russia. (See also the French Revolutionary Wars and the Napoleonic Wars.) In secret, Prussia recognised the French control of the west bank of the Rhine pending a cession by the Imperial Diet. France returned all of the lands east of the Rhine captured during the war. On the night of 6 April, the document was signed by the representatives of France and Prussia: François de Barthélemy and Karl August von Hardenberg. They were not face to face, each was in his own accommodation in Rosshof or the Markgräflerhof, and the papers were passed around by a courier. The treaty that ceded the left bank of the Rhine was in a secret article, along with the promise that of indemnifying the right bank if the left bank of the Rhine was covered in a final general peace in France. Peter Ochs drew up the treaty and served as a mediator for a significant proportion of these financial statements.

Prussia stuck to the agreement of the Treaty of Basel until 1806, when it joined the Fourth Coalition.

== Treaty between France and Spain ==
In the second treaty, on 22 July, Spain ceded the Captaincy General of Santo Domingo to France in exchange for keeping Gipuzkoa. The French also came at night to sign the peace treaty between France and Spain in which Spain was represented by Domingo de Iriarte, who signed the treaty in the mansion of Ochs, the Holsteinerhof. Spain would recapture the area in 1808/1809 and maintain it under a light colonial control until 1822. Following the Haitian Revolution the French claim to what is now the Dominican Republic would be de facto inherited by Haiti which occupied the area from 1822 to 1844. France would cede its de jure claim over the eastern part of the island to Spain in the 1814 Treaty of Paris. Owing partially to that, France refused to recognize any Haitian claim to the territory when it negotiated the Haiti Independence Debt and de jure recognition of Haiti's independence in 1825.

These treaties with Prussia and Spain broke the alliance between the French Republic's two main opponents of the First Coalition.

During the negotiations, France sought to re-gain Louisiana from Spain, but they were unsuccessful at achieving this in the negotiations.

== Other provisions and treaty partners ==
On 28 August 1795, the third treaty was completed, a peace between France and the Landgraviate of Hesse-Kassel, signed by Friedrich Sigismund Waitz von Eschen.

There was also an agreement to exchange the Austrian troops who had been captured in Belgium.

== See also ==
- Campaigns of 1795 in the French Revolutionary Wars
- Cisrhenian Republic
- List of treaties
