= Romergoline =

Clinical data
- Other names: FCE-23884; FCE23884; FCE-23,884; PNU-160260; PNU160260; PNU-160,260; 4-(9,10-Didehydro-6-methylergolin-8β-yl)methylpiperazine-2,6-dione
- Drug class: Dopamine receptor modulator
- ATC code: None

Identifiers
- IUPAC name: 4-[[(6aR,9S)-7-methyl-6,6a,8,9-tetrahydro-4H-indolo[4,3-fg]quinolin-9-yl]methyl]piperazine-2,6-dione
- CAS Number: 107052-56-2
- PubChem CID: 65898
- DrugBank: DB20790
- ChemSpider: 14411052
- UNII: I4880ZI08R
- ChEBI: CHEBI:230722
- ChEMBL: ChEMBL2104885
- CompTox Dashboard (EPA): DTXSID60147889

Chemical and physical data
- Formula: C_{20}H_{22}N_{4}O_{2}
- Molar mass: 350.422 g·mol^{−1}
- 3D model (JSmol): Interactive image
- SMILES: CN1C[C@@H](C=C2[C@H]1CC3=CNC4=CC=CC2=C34)CN5CC(=O)NC(=O)C5
- InChI: InChI=1S/C20H22N4O2/c1-23-8-12(9-24-10-18(25)22-19(26)11-24)5-15-14-3-2-4-16-20(14)13(7-21-16)6-17(15)23/h2-5,7,12,17,21H,6,8-11H2,1H3,(H,22,25,26)/t12-,17-/m1/s1; Key:RJCXNCSJGRUWRW-SJKOYZFVSA-N

Romergoline (INN; developmental code names FCE-23884 and PNU-160260) is a dopamine receptor modulator of the ergoline family which was under development for the treatment of Parkinson's disease and psychotic disorders but was never marketed. It is closely related to the psychedelic drug LSD in terms of chemical structure, though it is not technically a lysergamide itself as the oxygen atom of LSD's carboxamide moiety has been removed to instead form an aminomethyl moiety.

== Pharmacology ==
=== Pharmacodynamics ===
Romergoline shows high affinity for the dopamine D_{2} receptor (K_{i} = 6.5 nM), α_{2}-adrenergic receptor (K_{i} = 4.0 nM), and serotonin 5-HT_{1A} receptor (K_{i} = 4.0 nM). It also possesses moderate (submicromolar) affinity for the dopamine D_{1} receptor (K_{i} = 55 nM) and ketanserin-labeled serotonin 5-HT_{2} receptor (K_{i} = 24 nM). Conversely, the drug shows slight or negligible affinity for the α_{1}-adrenergic receptor (K_{i} = 113 nM), muscarinic acetylcholine receptors (K_{i} = >10,000 nM), and sigma receptors (K_{i} = >10,000 nM). Romergoline is said to act as both a dopamine receptor agonist and antagonist, depending on the circumstances. More specifically, the drug is said to act as a D_{2} receptor silent antagonist under normal dopamine-replete circumstances, but in a dopamine-depleted state, it acts as a powerful dopamine D_{1} receptor full agonist. This transformation of the drug's activity is thought to be due to development of dopamine D_{1} receptor supersensitivity with dopamine depletion.

Romergoline produces hypolocomotion in rodents and monkeys, inhibits apomorphine-induced climbing behavior in rodents, causes antiemetic effects in dogs, strongly increases prolactin levels in rodents, and antagonizes amphetamine-induced toxicity in rodents. With dopamine depletion however, romergoline induces hyperlocomotion and contralateral turning behavior in 6-hydroxydopamine-lesioned rodents, reverses MPTP-induced akinesia and parkinsonism in monkeys, and reverses reserpine-induced hypokinesia. In any case, in humans, romergoline did not show significant antiparkinsonian effects in a clinical trial.

=== Pharmacokinetics ===
A metabolite of romergoline is its 6-desmethyl derivative FCE-26506.

== Chemistry ==
=== Analogues ===
Analogues of romergoline have been described, for instance PNU-160425 and FCE-24379.

== History ==
Romergoline was first described in the scientific literature in 1991. It was under development by Pharmacia Corporation, but its development was discontinued by the early 2000s and the drug was never marketed.

== See also ==
- Substituted ergoline
- Substituted lysergamides § Related compounds
- LEK-8829
- Acetergamine
- Metergoline
- AWD 52-39
- FCE-24379
