= Addiction Research Center =

The Addiction Research Center (ARC) is a center of addiction research that was founded in 1935. It was originally based in Lexington, Kentucky, United States, housed on the rural campus of the US Public Health Service Hospital. The ARC shared the campus with the Federal Bureau of Prisons; subjects ("volunteers") for the human experimental research were drawn from a pool of felons convicted of drug charges. Dr Harris Isbell was the Director of Research from 1945 until 1963. The ARC became part of the National Institute on Drug Abuse in 1974. The ARC clinical research unit and basic science unit were relocated to Baltimore, Maryland in 1979 and 1984, respectively.

Research at the ARC is well-documented in two books published in 1978, both of which are available on-line: a book of conference proceedings, and an annotated bibliography.

== Involvement in Project MK-Ultra ==
During the 1950s and 1960s, the Central Intelligence Agency funded several research projects at the ARC under the MKUltra program. These studies aimed to explore the potential of psychoactive substances for interrogation and mind control purposes. Inmates, often from marginalized groups, were administered LSD and other drugs without informed consent, leading to significant ethical concerns. Sidney Gottlieb, a chemist and spymaster, was the head of the CIA's MKUltra program from 1953 to 1973. He was instrumental in overseeing experiments at the Addiction Research Center (ARC) in Lexington, Kentucky. The ARC while under the leadership of Dr. Harris Isbell, allowed these experiments to continue uncontested, which brought about several lawsuits from victims of the experiments.
