= Harris Isbell =

American pharmacologist (1910–1994)

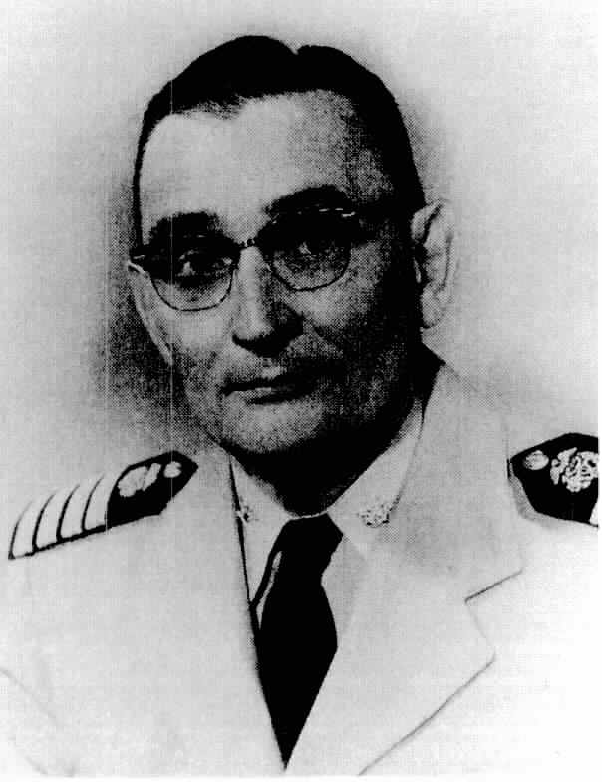
- Born: June 7, 1910; Arkansas
- Died: December 23, 1994 (aged 84); Lexington, Kentucky
- Parents: Francis Taylor Isbell (father); Celeste Mathews (mother)

Harris Isbell (June 7, 1910 – December 23, 1994) was an American pharmacologist and the director of research for the NIMH Addiction Research Center at the Public Health Service Hospital in Lexington, Kentucky from 1945 to 1963. He did extensive research on the physical and psychological effects of various drugs on humans (imprisoned narcotics offenders, see below). Early work investigated aspects of physical dependence (an important aspect of drug addiction) with opiates and barbiturates, while later work (at least partially funded by the Central Intelligence Agency as part of the MKUltra project) investigated psychedelic drugs, including LSD. The research was extensively reported in academic journals such as the Journal of Pharmacology and Experimental Therapeutics, Psychopharmacologia, and the A.M.A. Archives of Neurology and Psychiatry.

== Biography ==
Isbell was born on June 7, 1910, in Arkansas to Francis Taylor Isbell and Celeste Mathews. He received his M.D. from Tulane University School of Medicine in 1934, and held various research positions before becoming head of the Addiction Research Center (ARC) in 1945. He was awarded the US Public Health Service Meritorious Service Award in 1962; Attorney General Robert F. Kennedy praised him as "an extraordinarily able director and coordinator of multidisciplinary research" and "an outstanding investigator in his own right whose work in clinical pharmacology has exerted far-reaching influences on medical practice". After leaving the ARC in 1963, he became Professor of Medicine and Pharmacology at the University of Kentucky School of Medicine.

Isbell and his associates (including Abraham Wikler) published extensively on the effects of drugs (including opiates, synthetic opioids, barbiturates, alcohol, amphetamine, ibogaine, multiple psychedelics, and THC) on human subjects, with over 125 publications. Among their experimental results were the qualitative and quantitative documentation of physical dependence on barbiturates, physical dependence on alcohol, tolerance to amphetamine, the clinical use of opiate antagonists (e.g., nalorphine/Nalline and naloxone/Narcan) as treatment for opiate overdoses, the ability of methadone to alleviate opiate withdrawal symptoms, rapid tolerance but lack of physical dependence with LSD, cross-tolerance between LSD and psilocybin, and the ability of pure THC to cause marijuana-like effects. New pharmaceutical substances were assayed (in the prisoner population) for their abuse and addiction (substance dependence) potential (medications for pain, cough, and diarrhea were of particular concern), and this information was utilized by groups such as the World Health Organization.

Other work at the ARC during Isbell's tenure included psychological aspects of human opiate addiction (e.g., re-arousal of craving after abstinence upon return to the addiction environment, i.e. a "conditioned" response), EEG studies of mental activity during drug use (including mescaline), and animal studies. (A detailed annotated bibliography of ARC research was published in 1978.)

Isbell died on December 23, 1994, in Lexington, Kentucky.

== Research ==
Areas of interest described in Isbell's published work include physical and psychological effects of individual substances (including potential for dependence and addiction), ways to mitigate withdrawal symptoms (e.g., methadone therapy), the development of reliable rating methods and questionnaires for subjective drug effects (the Addiction Research Center Inventory), cross-drug comparisons, drug tolerance, and classification of drug groups (based on both the physiological and the subjective effects of a drug, as well as its cross-tolerance with other drugs).

=== "Volunteer" subjects ===
The subjects in Isbell's experiments are described as "volunteers"; they were recruited from the associated Lexington Public Health Service Hospital. The hospital was a US Government facility for treating drug abuse; some patients were sentenced drug offenders, while others voluntarily entered for treatment. The subjects in the ARC experiments were all incarcerated male narcotics offenders with a history of drug addiction; subjects signed a simple "Consent Form". Subjects were motivated by payment in the form of drugs (usually opiates); this fact is not documented in the published research articles. The separate living environment within the ARC for experimental subjects (e.g., the possibility of having a small private room) was also a motivation.

The use of prison subjects for these sorts of experiments (and the nature of payment) would be difficult or impossible to justify by current human subjects and informed consent standards. The potential for coercion in a prison environment is one concern; providing drugs (whether as experimental substances or as payment) to abstinent addicts in a treatment center is another. (See Campbell (2007) for a detailed discussion of ethical and historical aspects of the ARC subject protocols.)

Subjects in the experiments are described as physically healthy former drug addicts who were not psychotic, although they often were described as having "character disorders or inadequate personalities" (this diagnosis appears to be based on MMPI test evaluation). Subjects in some of the more extreme psychedelic experiments (LSD doses for 77 days in a row) were all "Negro males", though this is not a regular pattern (e.g., the 5 subjects in the similarly extreme 1950 barbiturate study described below were all white males). In spite of the risky nature of some of the experiments (e.g., inducing addiction to opiates, alcohol, barbiturates, or new minimally tested pharmaceuticals, and then forcing immediate and severe withdrawal), there were apparently no fatalities, though there was at least one close call.

Subjects sometimes dropped out in the middle of an experiment, although in one reported case a subject who wished to drop out after a severe negative reaction to a 180 microgram LSD dose ("He felt that he would die or would become permanently insane") required "considerable persuasion" to continue.

=== General methodology ===
The studies took place in a dedicated experimental ward. Given the hospital context, medical personnel were readily available. In general, the methodology appears scientifically sound (e.g., proper balancing of experimental conditions, within-subjects designs, single (sometimes double) blind procedures as appropriate, placebo conditions, careful documentation of the experimental procedures, appropriate awareness of potential confounding factors, etc.), although the small number of subjects in some of the experiments is a statistical concern.

The general methodology for the addiction studies consisted of first getting subjects drug-free (with apparent exceptions for cigarettes and coffee), and then attempting to induce addiction by regular administration (orally or injected) of the substance of interest. Addiction was determined by the occurrence of abstinence symptoms when administration of the substance stopped. Sometimes a different substance (e.g., methadone) would be administered at the peak of withdrawal to determine if it alleviated symptoms. Following the evaluation of this cold turkey withdrawal, subjects were then usually more gradually weaned off of the substance being tested.

Isbell also evaluated the "euphoric" effect of various drugs (typically opioids), evaluating various doses to see if they induced similar effects (e.g., talkativeness, comfort in the experimental situation, sedation in high doses) as 30 mg of morphine. The ability to induce euphoria is sometimes/often considered to be a component of addiction liability.

In the psychedelic studies, subjects had the choice of staying in an individual room or mingling with other subjects in a common area. Observations and measurements were taken before the substance of interest was ingested, and hourly thereafter (following a 10-minute rest in bed). Physical measurements included pulse, blood pressure, rectal temperature, kneejerk reflex sensitivity, and pupil diameter (opiates cause constriction (miosis) while LSD causes dilation (mydriasis)). Psychological measurements consisted of a self-evaluation form with multiple statements (e.g., "I am confused"), as well as evaluation by experienced and trained observers. Some subjects had negative reactions to LSD (as noted above), but others found the experience "pleasant", or even "dearly loved" it as long as the dosage was not too high (less than 2 micrograms per kilogram of body weight).

=== Opioids ===
Isbell and associates published a number of studies on morphine, methadone and assorted analgesics; much of this work was motivated by the search for a "nonaddicting analgesic" (that is, a compound with the pain-relieving capabilities of morphine, but without the opioid dependence issues). Many opiate derivatives and synthetic opioids were tested for addiction and abuse potential.

Isbell and Vogel (1949) investigated methadone, a synthetic opioid developed in Germany in 1937. They found that intravenous methadone had similar subjective effects as morphine and heroin, and induced physical dependence with chronic use. However, the withdrawal symptoms were significantly milder than with morphine. Administration of methadone during morphine withdrawal alleviated withdrawal symptoms, and methadone was reasonably effective when taken orally. This combination of characteristics led them to propose methadone administration as a way of facilitating morphine withdrawal.

=== Barbiturates ===
Isbell et al. (1950) did a controlled experiment (no other drugs involved, and proper nutrition) on the effects of chronic barbiturate administration. 5 non-epileptic subjects were given slowly increasing doses of secobarbital, pentobarbital, or amobarbital to a point of obvious intoxication over a period of more than 73 days. Both the nature of the intoxication and the nature of the withdrawal symptoms are described as similar to chronic alcohol use. Intoxication symptoms included confusion, poor judgment, hostility, and motor incoordination. Upon abrupt withdrawal of barbiturates, initial symptoms included tremor, anxiety, weakness, and vomiting, followed by convulsion, delirium, and hallucinations.

=== Alcohol ===
Isbell et al. (1955) demonstrated that alcohol causes physical dependence; that is, cessation of alcohol consumption in a chronic user can cause significant physical withdrawal symptoms. Subjects were abstinent drug addicts; some but not all had a history of heavy alcohol use. Out of 10 initial subjects, 6 subjects were successfully kept in a state of constant moderate intoxication (still able to walk) for a period from 48 to 87 days. Subjects were given controlled oral doses of alcohol throughout the day from 6 am until midnight, and a booster dose around 3 am; the total consumption per subject was in the range of a quart of 80-proof liquor per day. All subjects were provided with a healthy diet in addition to the alcohol.

Withdrawal of alcohol at the end of the intoxication period produced tremors and weakness in all 6 subjects. Two subjects experienced convulsions, and delirium or hallucinations (audio or visual) occurred in 4 of the 6 subjects. Given these withdrawal symptoms, Isbell et al. (1955) made some proposals for safely managing alcohol withdrawal.

=== Psychedelics ===
Starting in 1956, Isbell and associates published studies on LSD, psilocybin, psilocin, DMT, bufotenine, morning glory seeds (ololiuqui), and mescaline; these substances were sometimes described as "psychotomimetic". LSD and psilocybin for many of the experiments were supplied by Sandoz Pharmaceuticals (both of these substances were legal at the time). According to a 1986 interview with Isbell, the psychedelics research was initiated by an explicit CIA request.

==== LSD ====
- Isbell et al. (1956) motivated their study of LSD by the superficial similarities between the LSD state (viewed as a temporary "reversible psychosis") and schizophrenia, as well as the previous findings of interactions between LSD and the endogenous neurotransmitter serotonin. A dosage of 1-2 micrograms per kilogram of body weight was determined to induce "striking effects" (mood change, perceptual distortion, pupil dilation). Four experiments then quantified tolerance effects (the extent to which repeated doses of LSD cause a reduction in the effect of a subsequent dose). Experiment 4 included 77 consecutive days with doses of 1.55 micrograms/kg (corresponding to a dose of 140 micrograms for someone weighing 200 pounds), although the full sequence of LSD doses was at least a week or two longer than this due to the tolerance protocol. Tolerance to LSD developed rapidly; by day 3 the subjective effects were significantly lessened, and later in the experiments subjects simply read and watched TV normally. In the middle of the experiment, even a quadruple dose (600 micrograms or so) had little effect. Tolerance also disappeared rapidly; after no LSD had been given for 3 days, a subsequent dose again had a large effect. There were no abstinence symptoms after LSD administration stopped (i.e., no physical dependence).
- Isbell et al. (1956) also concluded that the LSD reaction "had only a superficial resemblance to the chronic forms of any of the major psychoses".
- Isbell and Logan (1957) reported that chlorpromazine (Thorazine) could either block or reverse the effects of LSD. Azacyclonol had no effect, while pre-treatment with reserpine augmented the effects of LSD (though in a manner described as "unpleasant"). Isbell et al. (1959b) reported that pre-treatment with scopolamine (an acetylcholine antagonist), phenoxybenzamine (an adrenergic alpha blocker) or "BAS" (a 5-methoxytryptamine based serotonin antagonist) had little effect on a subsequent LSD dose. They attempt to explain these results within the neurotransmitter ("neurohumors") knowledge of the period.

==== Psilocybin ====
- Isbell (1959) reported that psilocybin had physical and psychological effects similar to LSD, although psilocybin had a shorter duration and much less potency for a given dosage.
- Isbell et al. (1961) found that 12 days treatment with LSD induced tolerance to either LSD or psilocybin (lessened response on pupil dilation and the psychological measures), and that psilocybin also induced tolerance to both LSD and psilocybin. This cross-tolerance supported the hypothesis that the two substances at least partially share their mechanism of action.

==== Other ====
- Wolbach et al. (1962) reported that mescaline and LSD had similar effects (although with different time course and potency), that direct tolerance could be induced by mescaline, and that each substance induced cross-tolerance to the other. This was particularly interesting, since LSD (and psilocybin) are indole compounds, while mescaline is not.
- Contrasting with the psilocybin and mescaline results, Isbell et al. (1964) found that tolerance to intramuscular LSD did not provide tolerance to an intramuscular injection of the indole hallucinogen DMT.
- Isbell et al. (1959c) investigated the psychological and physical effects of 13 different congeners of LSD, and correlated these effects with their potency as a serotonin antagonist in smooth muscle. With the exception of "ALD-52", all of the substances were less potent than LSD. There was low correlation between the smooth muscle and the "psychotomimetic" effects.

=== THC (marijuana) ===
Starting in 1967, Isbell and associates published a few studies on THC and marijuana (cannabis).

- Isbell et al. (1967) reported that pure THC (which had only recently been chemically isolated with its chemical structure identified) had marijuana-like effects (e.g., increased pulse rate (tachycardia) and altered time sense), whether smoked or taken orally. A number of other isolated compounds present in marijuana (cannabidiol (CBD), cannabichromene) did not show these effects.
- Isbell and Jasinski (1969) compared LSD (1.5 micrograms per kilogram of body weight, injected intramuscularly) and smoked THC (225 or 250 micrograms per kilogram of body weight, added to a tobacco cigarette). Physical symptoms were quite different (e.g., tachycardia with THC, dilated pupils with LSD), and tolerance to LSD did not cause tolerance to THC, suggesting different mechanisms of action. Their data do not show a statistical difference in the psychological effects of the two substances; this is somewhat surprising since cannabis is not usually considered to be a psychedelic drug. Whether this result is due to the small number of subjects, an inappropriate rating scale, the use of pure THC, or an exceedingly high THC dose (they report that some subjects had "hallucinations", and two subjects withdrew after experiencing "psychotic reactions" to THC) is unclear.
- Jasinski, Haertzen, and Isbell (1971) describe some of the subjective and physiological effects of the synthetic cannabinoids parahexyl and dimethylheptylpyran.

Isbell also investigated dosage effects of THC, and reported that low doses (4–6 mg) produced a pleasurable state (euphoria, perceptual distortion, and change of mood); this dosage was described by subjects as "good reefer". However, higher doses (18 milligrams of THC) reliably produced what Isbell referred to as a "psychotic reaction" (e.g., "all of a sudden [the subject] was on a trip and watching his own burial. The smoker will swear that what hit him never came from marijuana"). Isbell also commented on the potency of street marijuana of that time ("the local grass is probably pretty weak stuff").

== Drug policy ==
In 1951 Isbell testified to Congress before the passage of the Boggs Act of 1952 that "smoking marijuana has no unpleasant aftereffects, no dependence is developed on the drug, and the practice can easily be stopped at any time." (The main active ingredient THC was much lower in marijuana back then than it is now).

Isbell (1971b) (p 903) provides a liberal view of drug policy. He observes that the drug laws of the time are "excessively rigid and extremely punitive", and have not had any proven effect on the drug problem. He then states that "simple possession of a drug for one's own use should be a civil offense punishable only by a fine", and suggests the possibility that marijuana of low or moderate potency could be legalized and regulated like tobacco, while also observing that maintenance on barbiturates, cocaine, or amphetamine would not be "pharmacologically sound". However, Isbell rejected removing controls on marijuana, which would "open the way to more potent stuff" such as hashish, with the consequent risk of high-dose effects.
