= Markgräflerhof =

Coordinates: 47.5604°N 7.5838°E

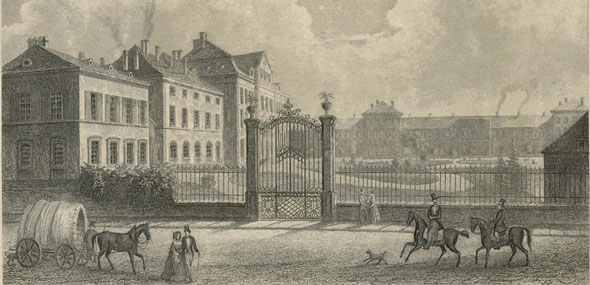
An engraving of the Markgräflerhof Palace

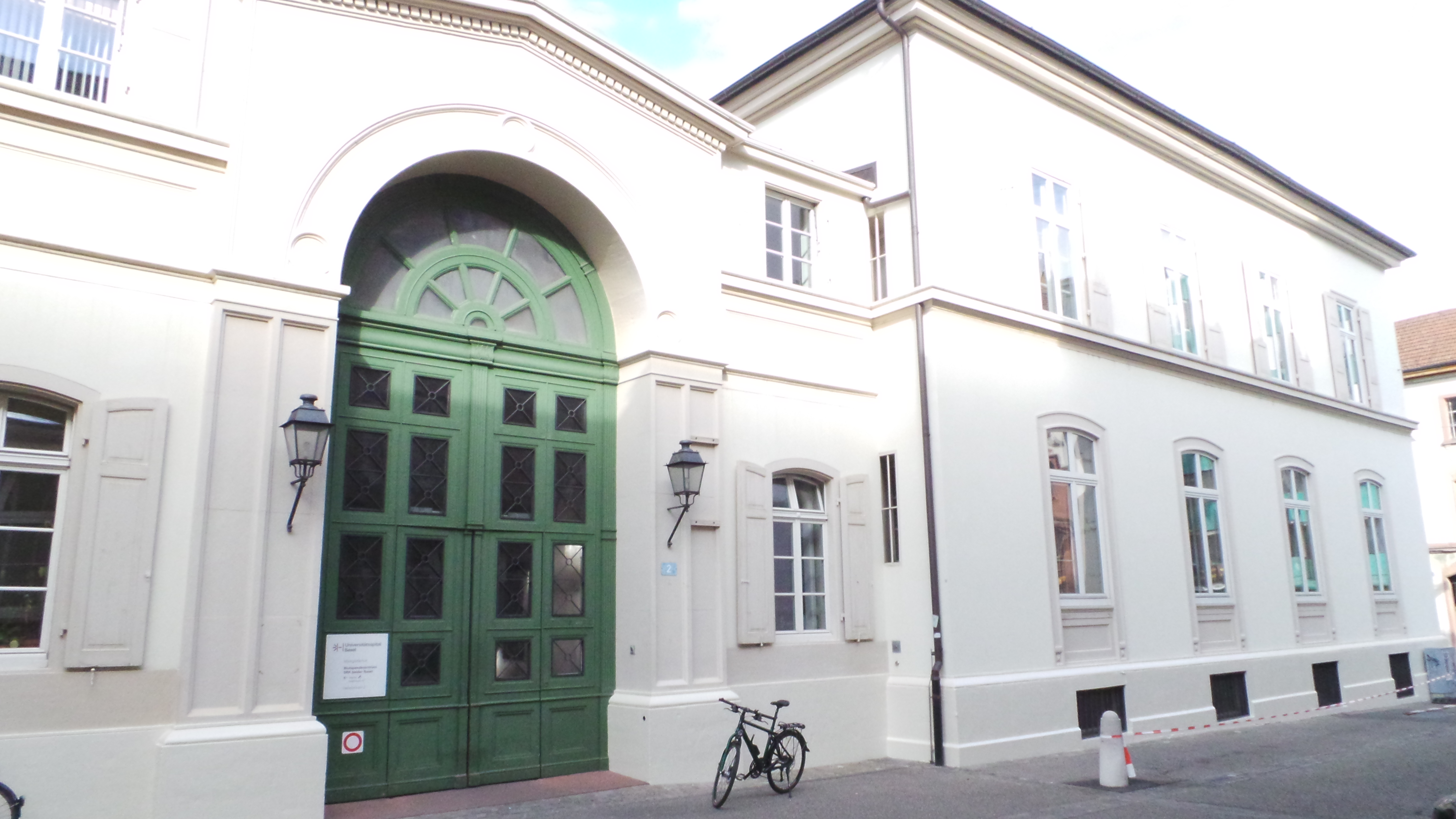
Entrance on the side of the palace

The Markgräflerhof is a baroque palace in Basel, Switzerland, built by the margraves of Baden-Durlach, who used it as an extraterritorial residence as their principality including its residences was often the victim of wars and armies. The margraves had several residences in Basel, but the construction of current palace started under margrave Frederick VII in 1698 when a fire destroyed the previous building. The palace was ready to moved in by 1705. The architect was an entrepreneur Augé who based himself on plans from a book by the French architect Charles Daviller. Frederick VII's successor Charles III William also often used the palace. But afterwards, the margraves predominantly resided in Karlsruhe. The city of Basel purchased the palace in 1807 and the University Hospital of Basel has used the building since 1842.

== References and sources ==
- Axel Christoph Gampp: Der Markgräflerhof in Basel. Das erste Barockpalais der Schweiz; in: Insitu. Zeitschrift für Architekturgeschichte, 2012, 1, S. 77-92.
