= GABAergic =

Affecting GABA systems in the brain

In molecular biology and physiology, something is GABAergic or GABAnergic if it pertains to or affects the neurotransmitter gamma-aminobutyric acid (GABA). For example, a synapse is GABAergic if it uses GABA as its neurotransmitter, and a GABAergic neuron produces GABA. A substance is GABAergic if it produces its effects via interactions with the GABA system, such as by stimulating or blocking neurotransmission.

A GABAergic or GABAnergic agent is any chemical that modifies the effects of GABA in the body or brain. Some different classes of GABAergic drugs include agonists, antagonists, modulators, reuptake inhibitors and enzymes.

== See also ==
- Adenosinergic
- Adrenergic
- Cannabinoidergic
- Cholinergic
- Dopaminergic
- Glutamatergic
- Glycinergic
- Histaminergic
- Melatonergic
- Monoaminergic
- Neurotransmission
- Opioidergic
- Serotonergic
