= Dihydroergocristine =

Names
- IUPAC name (10αH)-5′α-Benzyl-12′-hydroxy-2′-(propan-2-yl)-9,10-dihydroergotaman-3′,6′,18-trione
- Systematic IUPAC name (6aR,9R,10aR)-N-[(2R,5S,10aS,10bS)-5-Benzyl-10b-hydroxy-3,6-oxo-2-(propan-2-yl)-octahydro-8H-[1,3]oxazolo[3,2-a]pyrrolo[2,1-c]pyrazin-2-yl]-7-methyl-4,6,6a,7,8,9,10,10a-octahydroindolo[4,3-fg]quinoline-9-carboxamide

Identifiers
CAS Number	17479-19-5
3D model (JSmol)	Interactive image
ChemSpider	96884
DrugBank	DB13345
ECHA InfoCard	100.037.706
IUPHAR/BPS	278
PubChem CID	3065
UNII	05D48LUM4Z
CompTox Dashboard (EPA)	DTXSID3046322
- InChI: InChI=1/C35H41N5O5/c1-20(2)34(37-31(41)23-16-25-24-11-7-12-26-30( 24)22(18-36-26)17-27(25)38(3)19-23)33(43)40-28(15-21-9-5-4-6-10-2 1)32(42)39-14-8-13-29(39)35(40,44)45-34/h4-7,9-12,18,20,23,25,27- 29,36,44H,8,13-17,19H2,1-3H3,(H,37,41)/t23-,25-,27-,28+,29+,34-,3 5+/m1/s1
- SMILES: O=C3N1CCC[C@H]1[C@]2(O)O[C@](C(=O)N2[C@H]3Cc4ccccc4)(NC(=O)[C@@H]7C[C@@H]8c5cccc6c5c(c[nH]6)C[C@H]8N(C)C7)C(C)C

Properties
Chemical formula	C_{35}H_{41}N_{5}O_{5}
Molar mass	611.73 g/mol

Pharmacology
ATC code	C04AE04 (WHO)
- Except where otherwise noted, data are given for materials in their standard state (at 25 °C [77 °F], 100 kPa). Infobox references

Dihydroergocristine is an ergot alkaloid. Alongside dihydroergocornine and dihydroergocryptine, it is one of the components of ergoloid mesylates.
