= Dihydroergocornine =

Names
- IUPAC name (10αH)-12′-Hydroxy-2′,5′α-di(propan-2-yl)-9,10-dihydroergotaman-3′,6′,18-trione
- Systematic IUPAC name (6aR,9R,10aR)-N-[(2R,5S,10aS,10bS)-10b-Hydroxy-3,6-oxo-2,5-di(propan-2-yl)-octahydro-8H-[1,3]oxazolo[3,2-a]pyrrolo[2,1-c]pyrazin-2-yl]-7-methyl-4,6,6a,7,8,9,10,10a-octahydroindolo[4,3-fg]quinoline-9-carboxamide

Identifiers
CAS Number	25447-65-8
3D model (JSmol)	Interactive image
ChemSpider	147720
ECHA InfoCard	100.042.705
PubChem CID	168871
UNII	IK4C1OC8NE
CompTox Dashboard (EPA)	DTXSID1044013
- InChI: InChI=1S/C31H41N5O5/c1-16(2)26-28(38)35-11-7-10-24(35)31(40)36(26)29(39)30(41-31,17(3)4)33-27(37)19-12-21-20-8-6-9-22-25(20)18(14-32-22)13-23(21)34(5)15-19/h6,8-9,14,16-17,19,21,23-24,26,32,40H,7,10-13,15H2,1-5H3,(H,33,37)/t19-,21-,23-,24+,26+,30-,31+/m1/s1 Key: SEALOBQTUQIVGU-QNIJNHAOSA-N; InChI=1/C31H41N5O5/c1-16(2)26-28(38)35-11-7-10-24(35)31(40)36(26)29(39)30(41-31,17(3)4)33-27(37)19-12-21-20-8-6-9-22-25(20)18(14-32-22)13-23(21)34(5)15-19/h6,8-9,14,16-17,19,21,23-24,26,32,40H,7,10-13,15H2,1-5H3,(H,33,37)/t19-,21-,23-,24+,26+,30-,31+/m1/s1 Key: SEALOBQTUQIVGU-QNIJNHAOBI
- SMILES: CC(C)C1C(=O)N2CCCC2C3(N1C(=O)C(O3)(C(C)C)NC(=O)C4CC5C(CC6=CNC7=CC=CC5=C67)N(C4)C)O

Properties
Chemical formula	C_{31}H_{41}N_{5}O_{5}
Molar mass	563.687 g/mol
- Except where otherwise noted, data are given for materials in their standard state (at 25 °C [77 °F], 100 kPa). verify (what is ?) Infobox references

Dihydroergocornine is an ergot alkaloid. Alongside dihydroergocristine and dihydroergocryptine, it is one of the three components of ergoloid.

Dihydroergocornine is less effective than ergotamine tartrate and dihydroergotamine in treating patients with typical migraine, but it is also less toxic.

Dihydroergocornine can temporarily lower blood pressure and pulse rate intravenously, whereas oral administration has little effect.
