= FCE-24379 =

Clinical data
- Other names: FCE24379; 1-[5(10→9)abeo-6-methyl-9,10-didehydroergolin-8β-methyl]dihydrouracyl; Dihydro-1-((10,10a-didehydro-6-methyl-C(10-α)-homo-D-norergolin-8β-yl)methyl)-2,4(1H,3H)-pyrimidinedione
- Drug class: Serotonin receptor antagonist
- ATC code: None

Identifiers
- IUPAC name: 1-[[(4R,7R)-6-methyl-6,11-diazatetracyclo[7.6.1.0^{3,7}.0^{12,16}]hexadeca-1(16),2,9,12,14-pentaen-4-yl]methyl]-1,3-diazinane-2,4-dione
- CAS Number: 113869-44-6
- PubChem CID: 197245
- ChemSpider: 170807
- CompTox Dashboard (EPA): DTXSID40150593

Chemical and physical data
- Formula: C_{20}H_{22}N_{4}O_{2}
- Molar mass: 350.422 g·mol^{−1}
- 3D model (JSmol): Interactive image
- SMILES: CN1C[C@@H](C2=CC3=C4C(=CNC4=CC=C3)C[C@H]21)CN5CCC(=O)NC5=O
- InChI: InChI=1S/C20H22N4O2/c1-23-10-14(11-24-6-5-18(25)22-20(24)26)15-7-12-3-2-4-16-19(12)13(9-21-16)8-17(15)23/h2-4,7,9,14,17,21H,5-6,8,10-11H2,1H3,(H,22,25,26)/t14-,17-/m1/s1; Key:OJPZLSMBNYRZIW-RHSMWYFYSA-N

FCE-24379 is a potent serotonin receptor antagonist related to the ergolines. It is a 5(10→9)abeo-ergoline. The drug antagonizes vascular serotonin receptors, which may correspond to the serotonin 5-HT_{2A} receptor. It is inactive against adrenergic receptors including the α_{1}-, α_{2}-, β_{1}-, and β_{2}-adrenergic receptors. The drug produces hypotension in rodents. Other 5(10→9)abeo-ergolines have also been described. FCE-24379 was first described in the scientific literature by 1988.

== See also ==
- Substituted ergoline
- Romergoline (FCE-23884)
