= Epicriptine =

Chemical compound

Clinical data
- Other names: beta-Dihydroergocryptine
- Pregnancy category: Contraindicated
- Routes of administration: Oral
- ATC code: N04BC03 (WHO) (alpha/beta)

Legal status
- Legal status: In general: ℞ (Prescription only)

Identifiers
- IUPAC name: (2R,4R,7R)-N- [(1S,2S,4R,7S)- 2-hydroxy- 7-(S)-(1-methylpropyl)- 5,8-dioxo- 4-(propan-2-yl)- 3-oxa- 6,9-diazatricyclo [7.3.0.0^{2,6}]dodecan-4-yl]- 6-methyl- 6,11-diazatetracyclo [7.6.1.0^{2,7}.0^{12,16}] hexadeca- 1(16),9,12,14-tetraene- 4-carboxamide
- CAS Number: 88660-47-3
- PubChem CID: 3084313
- ChemSpider: 2341400
- UNII: 5M64643B5U
- ChEBI: CHEBI:59925
- ChEMBL: ChEMBL1378681
- CompTox Dashboard (EPA): DTXSID90941216
- ECHA InfoCard: 100.039.157

Chemical and physical data
- Formula: C_{32}H_{43}N_{5}O_{5}
- Molar mass: 577.726 g·mol^{−1}
- 3D model (JSmol): Interactive image
- SMILES: CCC(C)[C@H]1C(=O)N2CCC[C@H]2[C@]3(N1C(=O)[C@](O3)(C(C)C)NC(=O)[C@@H]4C[C@H]5[C@@H](CC6=CNC7=CC=CC5=C67)N(C4)C)O
- InChI: InChI=1S/C32H43N5O5/c1-6-18(4)27-29(39)36-12-8-11-25(36)32(41)37(27)30(40)31(42-32,17(2)3)34-28(38)20-13-22-21-9-7-10-23-26(21)19(15-33-23)14-24(22)35(5)16-20/h7,9-10,15,17-18,20,22,24-25,27,33,41H,6,8,11-14,16H2,1-5H3,(H,34,38)/t18?,20-,22-,24-,25+,27+,31-,32+/m1/s1; Key:SBFXHXZNBNFPHV-CROXOCCCSA-N

Epicriptine or beta-dihydroergocryptine is a dopamine agonist of the ergoline class. It constitutes one third of the mixture known as dihydroergocryptine, the other two thirds consisting of alpha-dihydroergocryptine. The alpha differs from the beta form only in the position of a single methyl group, which is a consequence of the biosynthesis in which the proteinogenic amino acid isoleucine is replaced by leucine.
