= Dihydroergocryptine =

Chemical compound

Clinical data
- Trade names: Almirid, Cripar
- Other names: Dihydroergocriptine; DHEC; 12'-Hydroxy-2'-(1-methylethyl)-5'α-(2-methylpropyl)-9,10α-dihydroergotaman-3',6',18-trione; (5'α,10α)-9,10-Dihydro-12'-hydroxy-2'-(1-methylethyl)-5'-(2-methylpropyl)-ergotaman-3',6',18-trione
- Pregnancy category: Contraindicated
- Routes of administration: Oral
- ATC code: N04BC03 (WHO) (alpha/beta)

Legal status
- Legal status: In general: ℞ (Prescription only)

Pharmacokinetic data
- Elimination half-life: 12–16 hours

Identifiers
- IUPAC name: (2R,4R,7R)-N-[(1S,2S,4R,7S)-2-hydroxy-7-(2-methylpropyl)-5,8-dioxo- 4-(propan-2-yl)-3-oxa-6,9-diazatricyclo [7.3.0.0^{2,6}]dodecan-4-yl]-6-methyl-6,11-diazatetracyclo [7.6.1.0^{2,7}.0^{12,16}] hexadeca-1(16),9,12,14-tetraene-4-carboxamide
- CAS Number: 25447-66-9
- PubChem CID: 114948
- ChemSpider: 102887
- UNII: 67V3FSL2GL
- ChEBI: CHEBI:59919
- ChEMBL: ChEMBL1743263
- CompTox Dashboard (EPA): DTXSID5048689
- ECHA InfoCard: 100.042.706

Chemical and physical data
- Formula: C_{32}H_{43}N_{5}O_{5}
- Molar mass: 577.726 g·mol^{−1}
- 3D model (JSmol): Interactive image
- SMILES: O=C3N1CCC[C@H]1[C@]2(O)O[C@](C(=O)N2[C@H]3CC(C)C)(NC(=O)[C@@H]6C[C@@H]7c4cccc5c4c(c[nH]5)C[C@H]7N(C)C6)C(C)C
- InChI: InChI=1S/C32H43N5O5/c1-17(2)12-25-29(39)36-11-7-10-26(36)32(41)37(25)30(40)31(42-32,18(3)4)34-28(38)20-13-22-21-8-6-9-23-27(21)19(15-33-23)14-24(22)35(5)16-20/h6,8-9,15,17-18,20,22,24-26,33,41H,7,10-14,16H2,1-5H3,(H,34,38)/t20-,22-,24-,25+,26+,31-,32+/m1/s1; Key:PBUNVLRHZGSROC-VTIMJTGVSA-N

Dihydroergocryptine (DHEC), sold under the brand names Almirid and Cripar among others, is a dopamine agonist of the ergoline group that is used as an antiparkinson agent in the treatment of Parkinson's disease. It is taken by mouth.

== Medical uses ==
=== Parkinson's disease ===
Dihydroergocryptine has been shown to be particularly effective as monotherapy in the early stages of Parkinson's disease. Initial monotherapy with a dopamine agonist (other examples include pergolide, pramipexole, and ropinirole) is associated with reduced risk for motor complications in Parkinson patients relative to levodopa. DHEC, like other dopamine agonists, aims to mimic the endogenous neurotransmitter and exert an antiparkinsonian effect. Recent evidence also supports that dopamine receptor agonists, instead of levodopa may slow or prevent the progression of Parkinson's disease.

The relatively long half-life and lack of dietary influence of dihydroergocriptine is considered to contribute to the compound's effectiveness in Parkinson's disease, particularly since it allows for more continuous stimulation of brain dopaminergic receptors than short-acting drugs such as levodopa. DHEC is also proven to be a safe and effective in improving symptoms in Parkinson's patients.

Motor improvements in Parkinson's patients are usually observed in patients who take at least a mean daily dose of approximately 40 mg. Patients on DHEC demonstrate a better score than if they were on levodopa on the Webster scale, a standardized rating scale of Parkinson's Disease symptoms such as gait parameters and dyskinesia. Another clinical study has shown that DHEC had superior efficacy in reducing the clinical and motorcomplications associated with long-term levodopa use, as well as in reducing the incidence and severity of adverse effects.

Activation of presynaptic dopamine autoreceptors by dihydroergocriptine leads to reduced dopamine receptor turnover and indirect antioxidant effects. In particular, further activation of intracellular kinase systems due to dopamine agonists are hypothesized to lead to antiapoptotic effects that also help in halting and slowing the disease progression. This may also contribute to prevention of development of motor fluctuations, though more research is needed.

Modern agonists like dihydroergocryptine typically cost two to three times more than levodopa therapy. More health economics assessments may be needed to determine whether the initial increased costs of the agonists are offset by less patients needing surgery in later stages of the disease.

=== Other uses ===
Dihydroergocryptine can also be used in migraine prophylaxis, as well as for the treatment of low blood pressure in elderly patients and peripheral vascular disorder. More commonly, it is used in combination with two similar compounds, dihydroergocornine and dihydroergocristine. This mixture is called ergoloid or codergocrine.

== Side effects ==
Dihydroergocryptine has been suggested to produce fewer side-effects and have similar efficacy to a classical dopamine agonist due to its biochemical profile. There is also no interference with levodopa metabolism. Although DHEC may come with some acute side-effects described further below, DHEC has overall good tolerability with little to no withdrawal or changes in its scheduling.

Acute side-effects usually accompany the beginning of treatment but tend to decrease as the patient develops increased tolerance to the drug. In randomized, double-blinded trials, individuals on different dopamine agonists, including dihydroergocryptine, did not differ in discontinuation rate associated with adverse events. However, there do seem to be a higher incidence of dopaminergic related side-effects such as hallucinations and gastrointestinal complaints tend to be more frequent.

- Nausea
- Vomiting
- Anxiety
- Cardiac arrhythmias
- Postural hypotension
- Somnolence
- Hallucinations
- Impulse control disorders
- Peripheral oedema

== Pharmacology ==
=== Pharmacodynamics ===
Several in vitro and in vivo studies have demonstrated that dihydroergocriptine is an effective anti-Parkinson drug, most likely exerting its effects as a potent agonist of D_{2} receptors. The K_{d} of DHEC is found to be around 5-8 nM at D2 receptors. Less certain is the contribution of its partial D_{1} receptor and D_{3} receptor agonist activity. DHEC has a lower affinity for D_{1} and D_{3} receptors (K_{d} is around 30 nM for both) than for D_{2} receptors. It is widely believed that dopamine receptor agonists demonstrate their antiparkinsonian effects by stimulating D2 receptors primarily, but other dopamine receptors, such as D1 and D3 may be involved.

Remarkably, DHEC is said to not significantly interact with serotonergic and adrenergic receptors.

=== Pharmacokinetics ===
Dihydroergocriptine has two main pharmacokinetic advantages over levodopa.

The first pharmacokinetic advantage is its half-life of 12 to 16 hours. This relatively long half-life is considered to contribute to the compound's effectiveness in Parkinson's disease, particularly since it allows for more continuous stimulation of brain dopaminergic receptors than short-acting drugs such as levodopa. Though the exact reason is not known, continuous stimulation is considered to reduce risk for motor complications.

The second pharmacokinetic advantage is the lack of dietary influence on drug absorption. This characteristic also allows for more sustained dopamine receptor stimulation.

DHEC can be taken with a single oral dose and is rapidly absorbed. Peak plasma concentrations occur between 30 and 120 minutes after administration. The strong first-pass hepatic metabolism results in poor bioavailability. Less than 5% of the original dosage reaches the circulation.

== Chemistry ==
Dihydroergocryptine is a mixture of two very similar compounds, alpha- and beta-dihydroergocryptine (epicriptine) at a ratio of 2:1. The beta differs from the alpha form only in the position of a single methyl group, which is a consequence of the biosynthesis of the parent compound ergocryptine, in which the proteinogenic amino acid leucine is replaced by isoleucine.

Dihydroergocryptine is a hydrogenated ergot derivative that is also structurally very similar to bromocriptine, another drug that has anti-Parkinson effects. DHEC differs in that it is hydrogenated in C9–C10 and lacks bromine in C2. In fact, all ergot derivatives are uniquely or mainly D_{2}-like receptor agonists.
