= Monoaminergic =

Agents that modulate or mimic monoaminergic neurotransmitters

Monoaminergic means "working on monoamine neurotransmitters", which include serotonin, dopamine, norepinephrine, epinephrine, and histamine.

A monoaminergic, or monoaminergic drug, is a chemical, which functions to directly modulate the serotonin, dopamine, norepinephrine, epinephrine, and/or histamine neurotransmitter systems in the brain. Monoaminergics include catecholaminergics (which can be further divided into adrenergics and dopaminergics), serotonergics, and histaminergics.

Examples of monoaminergic drugs include monoamine precursors, monoamine receptor modulators, monoamine reuptake inhibitors, monoamine releasing agents, and monoamine metabolism modulators such as monoamine oxidase inhibitors.

== See also ==
- Adenosinergic
- Adrenergic
- Cannabinoidergic
- Cholinergic
- Dopaminergic
- GABAergic
- Glycinergic
- Histaminergic
- Melatonergic
- Opioidergic
- Serotonergic
