= University Hospital of Basel =

Coordinates: 47°33′46″N 7°34′59″E

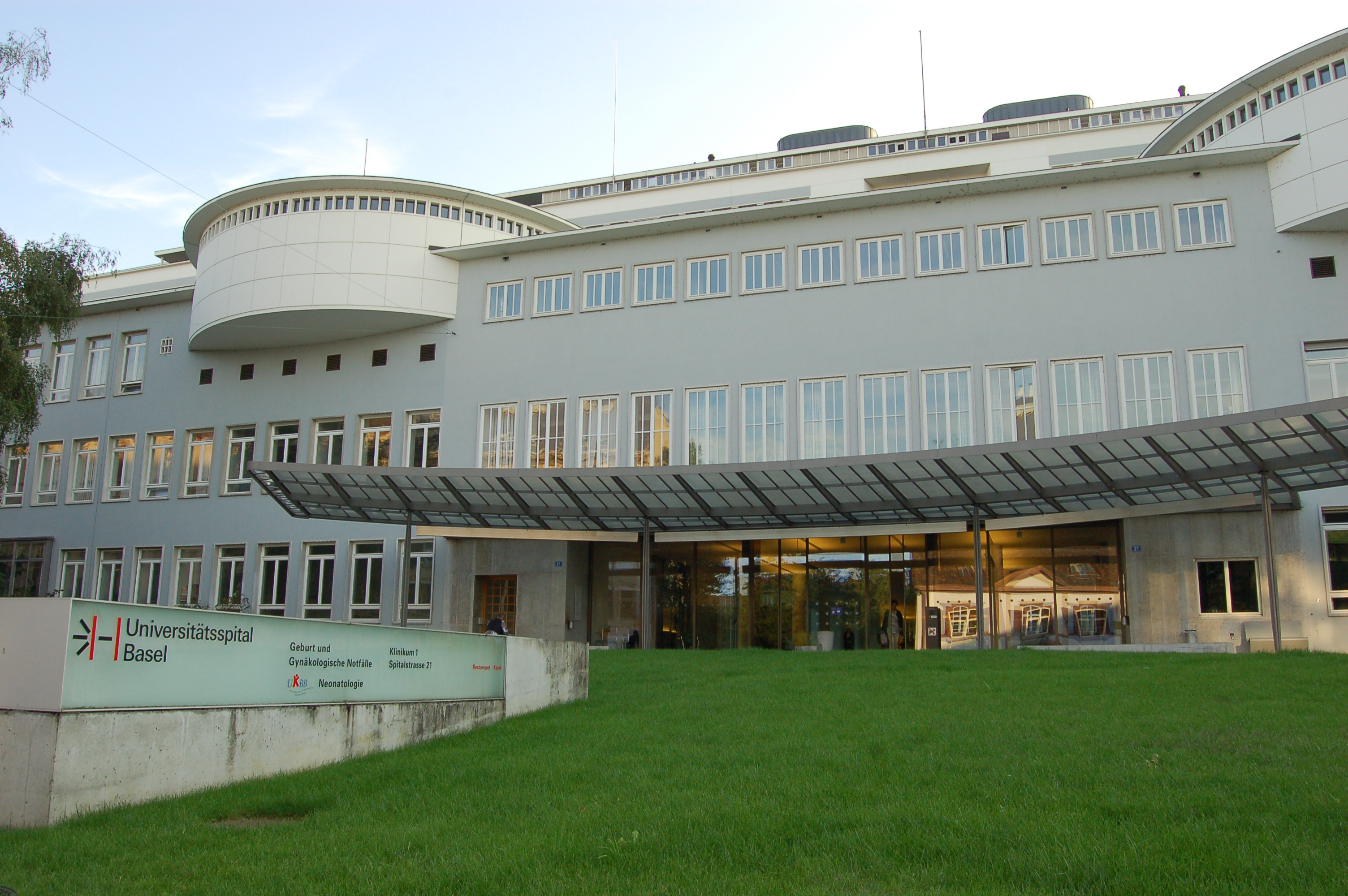
- Klinikum 1

Geography
- Location: Basel, Switzerland

Organisation
- Affiliated university: University of Basel

Services
- Beds: 773

Links
- Website: www.unispital-basel.ch

The University Hospital of Basel (German: Universitätsspital Basel, USB), in Basel, is one of the five university hospitals of Switzerland. Since 1842 it has been located in a former palace, the Markgräflerhof.

== Hospital ==
Until 1865 it was called the Bürgerspital (Citizens Hospital). In 1865, the Canton Basel-Stadt, the University of Basel and the hospital signed an agreement through which the formation of the professionals would be enabled and the canton would cover the costs for the expansion of the hospital. Since that date it has been called the Kantonsspital (The Cantons Hospital). As of 2004 its official denomination is Universitätsspital Basel (University Hospital).

USB brings together 50 clinics, units and institutes all working together in an interdisciplinary manner and employs a staff of about 5000. Since the beginning of 2012, the University Hospital has been an independent business. Following its spin-off from the state administration of the Canton of Basel-Stadt, it now has the organisational form of a state-owned enterprise.

With its 8,115 employees (as of 31 December 2024), who treat around 43,000 inpatients per year (as of 2024), the University Hospital Basel is one of the largest employers in the region. A characteristic feature is its close relationship with the University of Basel and the life sciences companies based in the region. With an approximate 670 beds, USB is the biggest healthcare facility in north-western Switzerland.

USB provides services in all fields of medicine apart from pediatrics.

In 1953 the hospital was one of the first that did extensive research on the first neuroleptic Chlorpromazine.

The hospital is well known for its special form of hormone-delivered radiotherapy to treat neuroendocrine cancer, tried by Steve Jobs in 2009. In Mai 2022, the University Hospital became the majority stakeholder of the Bethesda Hospital in Basel.
