= Cholinergic =

Agent that mimics choline

The N,N,N-trimethylethanolammonium cation, with an undefined counteranion, X^{−}

Acetylcholine

Cholinergic agents are compounds which mimic the action of acetylcholine and/or butyrylcholine. In general, the word "choline" describes the various quaternary ammonium salts containing the N,N,N-trimethylethanolammonium cation. Found in most animal tissues, choline is a primary component of the neurotransmitter acetylcholine and functions with inositol as a basic constituent of lecithin. Choline also prevents fat deposits in the liver and facilitates the movement of fats into cells.

The parasympathetic nervous system, which uses acetylcholine almost exclusively to send its messages, is said to be almost entirely cholinergic. Neuromuscular junctions, preganglionic neurons of the sympathetic nervous system, the basal forebrain, and brain stem complexes are also cholinergic, as are the receptor for the merocrine sweat glands.

In neuroscience and related fields, the term cholinergic is used in these related contexts:

- A substance (or ligand) is cholinergic if it is capable of producing, altering, or releasing acetylcholine, or butyrylcholine ("indirect-acting"), or mimicking their behaviours at one or more of the body's acetylcholine receptor ("direct-acting") or butyrylcholine receptor types ("direct-acting"). Such mimics are called parasympathomimetic drugs or cholinomimetic drugs.
- A receptor is cholinergic if it uses acetylcholine as its neurotransmitter.
- A synapse is cholinergic if it uses acetylcholine as its neurotransmitter.

== Cholinergic drug ==
=== Structure activity relationship for cholinergic drugs ===
1. A molecule must possess a nitrogen atom capable of bearing a positive charge, preferably a quaternary ammonium salt.
2. For maximum potency, the size of the alkyl groups substituted on the nitrogen should not exceed the size of a methyl group.
3. The molecule should have an oxygen atom, preferably an ester-like oxygen capable of participating in a hydrogen bond.
4. A two-carbon unit should occur between the oxygen atom and the nitrogen atom.
5. There must be two methyl groups on the nitrogen.
6. A larger third alkyl group is tolerated but more than one large alkyl groups leads to loss of activity.
7. The overall size of the molecule cannot be altered much. Bigger molecules have poorer activity.

== Cholinergic hypothesis of Alzheimer's disease ==
The hypothesis states that a possible cause of AD is the reduced synthesis of acetylcholine, a neurotransmitter involved in both memory and learning, two important components of AD. Many current drug therapies for AD are centered on the cholinergic hypothesis, although not all have been effective. Studies performed in the 1980s demonstrated significant impairment of cholinergic markers in Alzheimer's patients.

Thus it was proposed that degeneration of cholinergic neurons in the basal forebrain and the associated loss of cholinergic neurotransmission in the cerebral cortex and other areas contributed significantly to the deterioration in cognitive function seen in patients with Alzheimer's disease

Further studies on the cholinergic system and AD demonstrated acetylcholine plays a role in learning and memory. Scopolamine, an anticholinergic drug, was used to block cholinergic activity in young adults and induce memory impairments similar to those present in the elderly. The memory impairments were reversed when treated with physostigmine, a cholinergic agonist. However, reversing memory impairments in AD patients may not be this easy due to permanent changes in brain structure.

When young adults perform memory and attention tasks, brain activation patterns are balanced between the frontal and occipital lobes, creating a balance between bottom-up and top-down processing. Normal cognitive aging may affect long term and working memory, though the cholinergic system and cortical areas maintain performance through functional compensation. Adults with AD presenting with dysfunction of the cholinergic system are not able to compensate for long-term and working memory deficits.

AD is currently treated by increasing acetylcholine concentration by using acetylcholinesterase inhibitors to inhibit acetylcholinesterase from breaking down acetylcholine. Current acetylcholinesterase inhibitors approved in the United States by the FDA to treat Alzheimer's include donepezil, rivastigmine, and galantamine. These drugs work to increase the levels of acetylcholine and subsequently increase the function of neural cells. However, not all treatments based upon the cholinergic hypothesis have been successful in treating the symptoms or slowing the progression of AD. Therefore, a disruption to the cholinergic system has been proposed as a consequence of AD rather than a direct cause.

== See also ==
- Choline
- Acetylcholine
- Parasympathetic nervous system
- Neuromuscular junction
- Adrenergic
- Anticholinergic
- Dopaminergic
- GABAergic
- Glutamatergic
- Moly (herb)
- Nootropic
- Racetam
- Serotonergic
- Nicotinic acetylcholine receptor
