= Adrenergic =

Pertaining to adrenaline or noradrenaline, or their receptors

Adrenergic means "working on adrenaline (epinephrine) or noradrenaline (norepinephrine)" (or on their receptors). When not further qualified, it is usually used in the sense of enhancing or mimicking the effects of epinephrine and norepinephrine in the body.

- Adrenergic nervous system, a part of the autonomic nervous system that uses epinephrine or norepinephrine as its neurotransmitter

Regarding proteins:

- Adrenergic receptor, a receptor type for epinephrine and norepinephrine; subtypes include α_{1}, α_{2}, β_{1}, β_{2}, and β_{3} receptors
- Adrenergic transporter (norepinephrine transporter), a protein transporting norepinephrine from the synaptic cleft into nerve cells

Regarding pharmaceutical drugs:

- Adrenergic receptor agonist, a type of drug activating one or more subtypes of adrenergic receptors
  - This includes drugs regulating blood pressure and antiasthmatic drugs.
- Adrenergic receptor antagonist, a type of drug blocking one or more subtypes of adrenergic receptors
  - This mainly includes drugs lowering blood pressure.
- Adrenergic reuptake inhibitor, a type of drug blocking the norepinephrine transporter
  - This includes antidepressants and drugs against ADHD.

== See also ==
- Dopaminergic
- GABAergic
- Nootropic
- Serotonergic
- Glutamatergic
- Racetam
- List of distinct cell types in the adult human body
- Cholinergic
- Nicotinic acetylcholine receptor
