= Berridge =

Berridge is a surname. Notable people with the surname include:

- Bob Berridge (born 1959), British racing driver
- Daniel Berridge (born 1995), British trampoline gymnast
- Edmund William Berridge (1843–1923), British-born, US-based medical doctor in London, homoeopathist and occultist
- Elizabeth Berridge (disambiguation):
  - Elizabeth Berridge (actress) (born 1962), American actress
  - Elizabeth Berridge (novelist) (1919–2009), British author
  - Elizabeth Berridge, Baroness Berridge (born 1972), British politician
- Elvin Berridge (born 1989), cricketer from Saint Kitts
- Emily Mary Berridge (1872–1947), British palaeobotanist and bacteriologist
- Harold Berridge (1872–1949), British civil engineer and mechanical engineer
- James Samuel Berridge (1806–1885), British planter, businessman, judge and politician on Saint Kitts
- John Berridge (1716−1793), British Anglican evangelical revivalist and hymnist
- Kent C. Berridge, American professor of psychology and neuroscience
- Louise Berridge, British historical fiction writer
- Michael Berridge (1938–2020), British biochemist
- Mike Berridge (biologist), New Zealand cell biologist
- Mike Berridge (rugby union), English rugby union player
- Robert Berridge (born 1984), New Zealand professional light heavyweight boxer
- Sheeno Berridge (born 1990), West Indian cricketer
- Thomas Berridge (1857–1924), British Liberal politician and solicitor
- Virginia Berridge (born 1946), British academic historian and public health expert
- William Berridge (cricketer, born 1892), British cricketer
- William Berridge (cricketer, born 1894), British cricketer
- Brad Berridge, American Sound Designer
