= William Berridge =

William Berridge may refer to:

- William Berridge (cricketer, born 1892) (1892–1968), English cricketer
- William Berridge (cricketer, born 1894) (1894–1973), English cricketer
