= Kent C. Berridge =

American academic (born 1957)

Kent Berridge
- Born: 1957 (age 68–69)
- Education: University of California, Davis (BS); University of Pennsylvania (PhD)
- Scientific career
- Fields: Biopsychology; Neuroscience
- Workplaces: University of Michigan

Kent Charles Berridge (born 1957) is an American academic who is James Olds Distinguished University Professor of Psychology and Neuroscience at the University of Michigan. He is known for researching the brain mechanisms of affect, emotion, and motivation, and in particular, for originating the "wanting"/"liking" (or incentive salience) theory of motivation and pleasure, and, with Terry Robinson, the incentive sensitization theory of addiction. Berridge was a joint winner of the 2018 Grawemeyer Award for Psychology and was elected a member of the National Academy of Sciences in 2024.

== Early life and education ==
Berridge was born in 1957. He earned a Bachelor of Science from the University of California, Davis in 1979, followed by a PhD from the University of Pennsylvania in 1983.

== Research ==
Berridge conducts research relating to brain systems of motivation, affect, reward “liking”, reward “wanting”, emotion, fear, pleasure, drug addiction, eating disorders, and decision utility. He also studies natural syntactical chains of behavior (e.g. grooming; taste response patterns) in animals with colleague Dr. J. Wayne Aldridge. With Piotr Winkielman, he has investigated the issue of unconscious emotion in humans.

=== Liking ===
Berridge is known for his work on the brain systems for pleasure (“liking”). Using an assay for “liking” called Taste Reactivity Analysis developed by taste researchers, Berridge measures facial palatability responses to tastes, which are similar between rodents, primates and humans. When something enjoyably sweet is tasted, characteristic licking responses occur. When something aversively bitter is tasted, gaping and head shaking occur. Berridge has helped identify "hedonic hotspots" in the brain, such as the nucleus accumbens and ventral pallidum, where opioid, endocannabinoid, and GABA neurotransmission coordinate the “liking” of tastes. Berridge postulates that these hedonic hotspots may be crucial for how the brain produces the hedonic pleasurable feelings common to delicious food, sex, drugs, and other rewards (a role previously thought to be played mostly by brain dopamine systems).

=== Addiction ===
Berridge and colleague Terry Robinson have formulated a contemporary theory of addiction called the Incentive Sensitization Theory of Addiction. According to this theory, drug addiction develops from a sensitization of the mesolimbic dopamine system. Dopamine normally functions to attribute incentive salience to stimuli associated with rewards like food and sex, and triggers reward “wanting”. Drugs hijack this “wanting” system. Following repeated use of drugs, the dopamine system becomes hyper-responsive and drug cues become hyper-salient. This means drug cues are nearly impossible for addicts to ignore, and when they are encountered they can lead to intense cravings and/or relapse. This sensitized cue-triggered drug 'wanting' can persist for years after an addict quits drugs, and long after drug withdrawal has ceased. This fact may account for the tendency of former addicts to relapse to drug use after quitting, sometimes even after many years of abstinence.

=== Dopamine ===
Berridge and Robinson helped redefine the role of mesolimbic dopamine in the brain, which had previously been viewed as a pleasure neurotransmitter. Dopamine is no longer widely regarded as a pleasure transmitter. Instead, dopamine is thought to mediate reward, that is, to attribute incentive salience to reward-associated stimuli.

=== Awards ===
Berridge has been a Guggenheim Fellow and a Fulbright Senior Scholar. He shared the APA Award for Distinguished Scientific Contributions in 2016 and the 2018 Grawemeyer Award for Outstanding Ideas in Psychology with Terry Robinson. He was awarded the APS William James Fellow Lifetime Achievement Award from the Association for Psychological Science in 2023 and elected a member of the National Academy of Sciences in 2024.

== See also ==
- Dopamine
- Happiness
- Incentive salience
- Motivation
- Pleasure
- Reward system
- Substance dependence

== Selected publications ==
=== Books ===
- Morten L. Kringelbach; Kent C. Berridge (2010). Pleasures of the Brain. Oxford University Press. ISBN 978-0-19-533102-8.

=== Articles ===
- Robinson, T; Berridge, K (December 1993). "The neural basis of drug craving: An incentive-sensitization theory of addiction". Brain Research Reviews. 18 (3): 247–291. doi:10.1016/0165-0173(93)90013-p. ISSN 0165-0173. PMID 8401595.
- Berridge, Kent C. (June 2003). "Pleasures of the brain". Brain and Cognition. 52 (1): 106–128. doi:10.1016/s0278-2626(03)00014-9. ISSN 0278-2626. PMID 12812810.
- Kringelbach, M. L.; Berridge, K. C. (2009). "Towards a functional neuroanatomy of pleasure and happiness". Trends in Cognitive Sciences. 13 (11): 479–487. doi:10.1016/j.tics.2009.08.006. PMC 2767390. PMID 19782634.
- Berridge, K. C.; Kringelbach, M. L. (2015). "Pleasure systems in the brain". Neuron. 86 (3): 646–664. doi:10.1016/j.neuron.2015.02.018. PMC 4425246. PMID 25950633.
- Berridge, Kent C.; Robinson, Terry E. (November 2016). "Liking, wanting, and the incentive-sensitization theory of addiction". American Psychologist. 71 (8): 670–679. doi:10.1037/amp0000059. eISSN 1935-990X. ISSN 0003-066X. PMC 5171207. PMID 27977239.
