= Palatability =

Pleasure of taste for foods or drinks

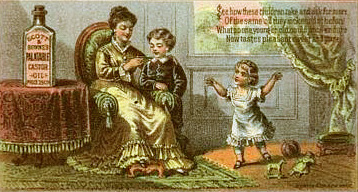
Advertisement of castor oil as a medicine by Scott & Bowne company, 19th century

Palatability (or palatableness) is the hedonic reward (which is pleasure of taste in this case) provided by foods or drinks that are agreeable to the "palate", which often varies relative to the homeostatic satisfaction of nutritional and/or water needs. The palatability of a dish or beverage, unlike its flavor or taste, varies with the state of an individual: it is lower after consumption and higher when deprived. It has increasingly been appreciated that this can create a hunger that is independent of homeostatic needs.

== Brain mechanism ==
The palatability of a substance is determined by opioid receptor-related processes in the nucleus accumbens and ventral pallidum. The opioid processes involve mu opioid receptors and are present in the rostromedial shell part of the nucleus accumbens on its spiny neurons. This area has been called the "opioid eating site".

The rewardfulness of consumption associated with palatability is dissociable from desire or incentive value which is the motivation to seek out a specific commodity. Desire or incentive value is processed by opioid receptor-related processes in the basolateral amygdala. Unlike the liking palatability for food, the incentive salience wanting is not downregulated by the physiological consequences of food consumption and may be largely independent of homoeostatic processes influencing food intake.

Though the wanting of incentive salience may be informed by palatability, it is independent and not necessarily reduced to it. It has been suggested that a third system exists that links opioid processes in the two parts of the brain: "Logically this raises the possibility that a third system, with which the accumbens shell, ventral pallidum, and basolateral amygdala are associated, distributes the affective signals elicited by specific commodities across distinct functional systems to control reward seeking. At present we do not have any direct evidence for a system of this kind, but indirect evidence suggests it may reside within the motivationally rich circuits linking hypothalamic and brainstem viscerogenic structures such as the parabrachial nucleus.

It has also been suggested that hedonic hunger can be driven both in regard to "wanting" and "liking" and that a palatability subtype of neuron may also exist in the basolateral amygdala.

== Satiety and palatability ==
Appetite is controlled by a direct loop and an indirect one. In both the direct and indirect loops there are two feedback mechanisms. First a positive feedback involving its stimulation by palatability food cues, and second, a negative feedback due to satiation and satiety cues following ingestion. In the indirect loop these cues are learnt by association such as meal plate size and work by modulating the potency of the cues of the direct loop. The influence of these processes can exist without subjective awareness.

The cessation of a desire to eat after a meal "satiation" is likely to be due to different processes and cues. More palatable foods reduce the effects of such cues upon satiation causing a larger food intake, exploited in hyperpalatable food. In contrast, unpalatability of certain foods can serve as a deterrent from feeding on those foods in the future. For example, the variable checkerspot butterfly contains iridoid compounds that are unpalatable to avian predators, thus reducing the risk of predation.

== See also ==
- Acquired taste
- Flavor
- Food craving
- Motivation
- Nutrition
- Pleasure center
