= Motivational salience =

Cognitive process

Motivational salience is a cognitive process and a form of attention that motivates or propels an individual's behavior towards or away from a particular object, perceived event or outcome. Motivational salience regulates the intensity of behaviors that facilitate the attainment of a particular goal, the amount of time and energy that an individual is willing to expend to attain a particular goal, and the amount of risk that an individual is willing to accept while working to attain a particular goal.

Motivational salience is composed of two component processes that are defined by their attractive or aversive effects on an individual's behavior relative to a particular stimulus: incentive salience and aversive salience. Incentive salience is the attractive form of motivational salience that causes approach behavior, and is associated with operant reinforcement, desirable outcomes, and pleasurable stimuli. Aversive salience (sometimes known as fearful salience) is the aversive form of motivational salience that causes avoidance behavior, and is associated with operant punishment, undesirable outcomes, and unpleasant stimuli.

== Incentive salience ==
Addiction and dependence glossary
- addiction – a neuropsychological disorder characterized by a persistent and intense urge to use a drug or engage in a behavior that produces natural reward; addictive drug – psychoactive substances that with repeated use are associated with significantly higher rates of substance use disorders, due in large part to the drug's effect on brain reward systems; dependence – an adaptive state associated with a withdrawal syndrome upon cessation of repeated exposure to a stimulus (e.g., drug intake); drug sensitization or reverse tolerance – the escalating effect of a drug resulting from repeated administration at a given dose; drug withdrawal – symptoms that occur upon cessation of repeated drug use; physical dependence – dependence that involves persistent physical–somatic withdrawal symptoms (e.g., delirium tremens and nausea); psychological dependence – dependence that is characterized by emotional-motivational withdrawal symptoms (e.g., anhedonia and anxiety) that affect cognitive functioning.; reinforcing stimuli – stimuli that increase the probability of repeating behaviors paired with them; rewarding stimuli – stimuli that the brain interprets as intrinsically positive and desirable or as something to approach; sensitization – an amplified response to a stimulus resulting from repeated exposure to it; substance use disorder – a condition in which the use of substances leads to clinically and functionally significant impairment or distress; drug tolerance – the diminishing effect of a drug resulting from repeated administration at a given dose

Incentive salience is a cognitive process that grants a "desire" or "want" attribute, which includes a motivational component to a rewarding stimulus. Reward is the attractive and motivational property of a stimulus that induces appetitive behavior – also known as approach behavior – and consummatory behavior. The "wanting" of incentive salience differs from "liking" in the sense that liking is the pleasure that is immediately gained from the acquisition or consumption of a rewarding stimulus; the "wanting" of incentive salience serves a "motivational magnet" quality of a rewarding stimulus that makes it a desirable and attractive goal, transforming it from a mere sensory experience into something that commands attention, induces approach, and causes it to be sought out.

Incentive salience is regulated by a number of brain structures, but it is assigned to stimuli by a region of the ventral striatum known as the nucleus accumbens shell. Incentive salience is primarily regulated by dopamine neurotransmission in the mesocorticolimbic projection, (Note: The mesocorticolimbic projection is a group of dopamine pathways that connects the ventral tegmental area to the nucleus accumbens and prefrontal cortex.) but activity in other dopaminergic pathways and hedonic hotspots (e.g., the ventral pallidum) also modulate incentive salience.

== Aversive salience ==
Aversive salience describes the motivation behind avoidance behavior towards a negative presenting stimulus developed through learning and memory recall. Avoidance behavior emerges when a once novel stimulus becomes associated to an undesirable outcome. In Pavlovian conditioning, developed by Ivan Pavlov, pairing of a neutral conditioned stimulus (such as a soft tone) with an aversive unconditioned stimulus (such as bitter flavors, loud tones, electric shocks) results in association of the once neutral stimulus with a negative outcome. The previously neutral stimulus elicits avoidance behavior upon future presentation.

=== Neural responses in formation of aversive salience ===
Neural circuity between areas of the prefrontal cortex and basal ganglia encode aversive salience based on behavioral relevance rather than mere negative valance of the stimulus. Neural recognition of behavioral importance of aversive stimuli promote adaptive avoidance and drive goal motivated behavior.

Aversive salience can be influenced by distinctive changes in neural firing. Silencing of specific neural populations within the parabrachial nucleus reduces acquisition of conditioned taste aversion (CTA). Activation of distinct neural populations within the parabrachial nucleus can establish CTA.

== Clinical significance ==
=== Addiction ===
The assignment of incentive salience to stimuli is dysregulated in addiction. Addictive drugs are intrinsically rewarding (not to be confused with pleasure) and therefore function as primary positive reinforcers of continued drug use that are assigned incentive salience. During the development of an addiction, the repeated association of otherwise neutral and even non-rewarding stimuli with drug consumption triggers an associative learning process that causes these previously neutral stimuli to act as conditioned positive reinforcers of addictive drug use (i.e., these stimuli start to function as drug cues). As conditioned positive reinforcers of drug use, these previously neutral stimuli are assigned incentive salience (which manifests as a craving) – sometimes at pathologically high levels due to reward sensitization – which can transfer to the primary reinforcer (e.g., the use of an addictive drug) with which it was originally paired. Thus, if an individual remains abstinent from drug use for some time and encounters one of these drug cues, a craving for the associated drug may reappear. For example, anti-drug agencies previously used posters with images of drug paraphernalia as an attempt to show the dangers of drug use. However, such posters are no longer used because of the effects of incentive salience in causing relapse upon sight of the stimuli illustrated in the posters.

In addiction, the "liking" (pleasure or hedonic value) of a drug or other stimulus becomes dissociated from "wanting" (i.e., desire or craving) due to the sensitization of incentive salience. In fact, if the incentive salience associated with drug-taking becomes pathologically amplified, the user may want the drug more and more while liking it less as tolerance develops to the drug's pleasurable effects.

== Neuropsychopharmacology ==
=== Dopaminergic psychostimulants ===
Amphetamine improves task saliency (motivation to perform a task) and increases arousal (wakefulness), in turn promoting goal-directed behavior. The reinforcing and motivational salience-promoting effects of amphetamine are mostly due to enhanced dopaminergic activity in the mesolimbic pathway.

== Dopaminergic activity ==
=== Dopamine response ===
Distinctive patterns in dopamine activity in response to external stimuli influence motivational behavior. Tonic dopamine refers to steady dopamine release from dopaminergic neurons at baseline conditions. Phasic dopamine include fast bursts of dopamine activity, represented by spikes in activation or inhibition from tonic levels, upon presentation of an external stimulus. External stimuli can include aversive and appetitive cues both eliciting distinct dopaminergic response patterns. Neural populations which activate to distinct cues show uniformity in activity pattern upon presentation of similar cues, such the same population of neurons that respond to an aversive cue respond similarly to another aversive cue.

Increased phasic dopaminergic activity influences motivational salience. An appetitive predicting stimulus and reward acquisition elicit the same patterns of activity. Suggesting reward predicting cues gain incentive salience. During an aversive stimulus, phasic increased dopaminergic firing is minimal, with a greater response in phasic inhibition and majority of neurons unresponsive. Suppressing dopamine effects through neuroleptics or lesions to areas in the dopamine pathway, suppressed motivational behavior seen through decreased participation to rewarding tasks.

==== Reward Prediction Error Hypothesis ====
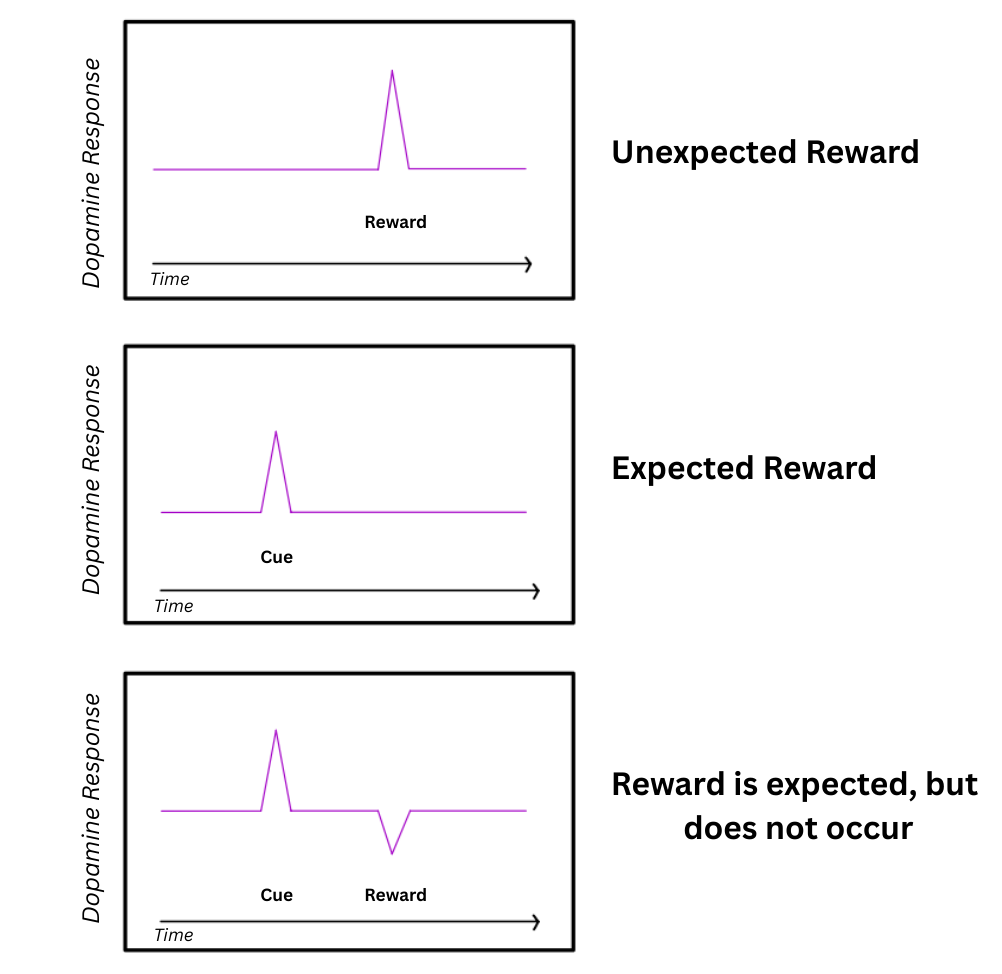
Illustration of the Reward Prediction Error Hypothesis. Dopaminergic firing patterns in response to rewards and reward-predicting cues.

The "Reward Prediction Error Hypothesis" developed by Neuroscientist Wolfram Schultz, associates dopamine response to reward expectation. Schultz describes phasic timing of dopamine activity as a indication of reward processing, using aspects of the reward system establishing the mechanisms of learning.

Novel tasks elicit positive spikes in phasic dopamine. The same positive spikes are elicited during reward acquisition. As associations between the reward-predicting cue and the reward develop during learning, phasic dopamine activity shifts from firing at reward acquisition to upon presentation of the cue. This shift in firing is described as associative learning by the 'Reward Prediction Error Hypothesis' as the reward has become expected. When the expected reward is removed, phasic dopamine shows large inhibition represented by a dip in activity. The combination between acquisition of the reward being "better than expected" and absence of the reward being "worse than expected" is what the Hypothesis describes as "reinforcement learning". Predicting future rewards drives behavioral outcomes and serve as a neural rendering to motivation.

== See also ==
- Dalbir Bindra
- Conditioned place preference
- Desire
- Dopamine
- Kent C. Berridge
- Medium spiny neuron § Ventral striatal MSNs
- Pavlovian-instrumental transfer
- Pleasure
- Reward system
