= John Garcia (psychologist) =

American psychologist (1917–2012)

John Garcia (June 12, 1917 – October 12, 2012) was an American psychologist, most known for his research on conditioned taste aversion. Garcia studied at the University of California-Berkeley, where he received his A.B., M.A., and Ph.D. degrees in 1948, 1949, and 1965, going into his late forties. At his death, he was professor emeritus at University of California, Los Angeles. Previously, he was an assistant professor at California State University at Long Beach, a lecturer in the Department of Surgery at Harvard Medical School, professor and chairman of the Psychology Department at the State University of New York at Stony Brook, and Professor of Psychology at the University of Utah. A Review of General Psychology survey, published in 2002, ranked Garcia as the 88th most cited psychologist of the 20th century, tied with James J. Gibson, David Rumelhart, Louis Leon Thurstone, Margaret Floy Washburn, and Robert S. Woodworth.

== Early life ==
Garcia was born to a farm family on June 12, 1917, near Santa Rosa, California. He was a farmer, a cartoonist, a shipfitter, an Air Corps Cadet, an amateur boxer, a high school teacher and a college professor, as well as a research scientist at Harvard Medical School and the Brain Research Institute at UCLA. During World War II he built submarines for the US Navy, and then enlisted in the Army Air Corps.

Garcia was a first-generation American, the son of Spanish immigrants Sara Casasnovas y Unamuno and Benigno Garcia y Rodriguez. By age 20, he was working as a mechanic building 18-wheeler trucks. A few years later he solved the problem of installing mufflers onto submarines and consequently became a ship fitter. During World War II, he joined the United States Army Air Corps and became a pilot; after persistent nausea, he could no longer fly and he finished his term as an intelligence specialist. When demobilized, he used the G.I. Bill to pay for his college tuition. He attended Santa Rosa Junior College, where he achieved a bachelor's degree. He then attended the University of California at Berkeley where he achieved a master's degree and Ph.D.

In 1943, he married Dorothy Inez Robertson. In 1985, after he retired from UCLA, they moved to Skagit County, Washington.

After the war, Garcia used the G.I. Bill to go to UC Berkeley where he initially intended to study veterinary medicine. However, his interest quickly peered to radiation and brain research. Early on, he discovered that rats could detect and avoid low doses of radiation, lower than a dental x-ray. This led to sharp scientific battles with B.F. Skinner's behaviorist psychology and pro-nuclear members of the military–industrial complex, a fight he eventually won. When sheep started dying en masse downwind from the nuclear test sites, it was members of his lab that identified the cause as radiation poisoning. He flew to Vienna with JFK to meet with the Russians; he testified before congress along with Dr. Martin Luther King Jr.

His later work showed how taste aversion could be used to train wolves and coyotes, in the wild, not to prey on livestock. The "Garcia Theory" (of taste aversion) is named for him. Additionally the Howard Crosby Warren Medal for psychological research was given to him in 1978.

== Research ==
Garcia's first postdoctoral job was with the U.S. Naval Radiological Defense Lab in San Francisco, California in 1955. He began to study the reaction of the brain to ionizing radiation in a series of experiments on laboratory animals, mainly rats. Garcia noticed that rats avoided drinking water from plastic bottles when in radiation chambers. He suspected that the rats associated the "plastic tasting" water with the sickness that radiation triggers.

During the experiments rats were given one taste, sight, and sound as a neutral stimulus. Later the rats would be exposed to radiation or drugs (the unconditioned stimulus), which would make the rats sick. Through these experiments, Garcia discovered that if a rat became nauseated after presented with a new taste, even if the illness occurred several hours later, the rat would avoid that taste. This contradicted the belief that, for conditioning to occur, the unconditioned response (in this case, sickness) must immediately follow the conditioned stimulus-to-be (the taste). Secondly, Garcia discovered that the rats developed aversions to tastes, but not to sights or sounds, disproving the previously held theory that any perceivable stimulus (light, sound, taste, etc.) could become a conditioned stimulus for any unconditioned stimulus.

Garcia's discovery, conditioned taste aversion, is considered a survival mechanism because it allows an organism to recognize foods that have previously been determined to be poisonous, hopefully allowing said organism to avoid sickness.

As a result of Garcia's work, conditioned taste aversion has been called the "Garcia Effect."

Throughout his work Garcia also achieved a number of awards such as the Howard Crosby Warren Medal and the APA Distinguished Scientific Contribution Award. He was elected to the National Academy of Sciences in 1983 and has over 130 publications.

== Works cited ==
https://www.zimbardo.com/life-and-legacy-of-psychologist-john-garcia/

- Bernstein, D.A.; Penner, L.A.; Clarke-Stewart, A.; Roy, E.J. (2006). Psychology: 7th Edition. Boston, MA: Houghton Mifflin Company.
- Myers, D.G. (2007). Psychology: Eighth Edition. New York, NY: Worth Publishers.
- Martinez, J. (1998). Dr. John Garcia - 1998 Special Achievement Award. Retrieved September 8, 2007, from https://web.archive.org/web/20060919182106/http://www.andp.org/activities/garcia.htm
- Riley, A.L.; Freeman, K.B. (2003). Conditioned Taste Aversion. Retrieved September 8, 2007, from http://www.ctalearning.com/
