= Conditioned taste aversion =

Biological process

Conditioned taste aversion occurs when an animal acquires an aversion to the taste of a food that was paired with aversive stimuli. The effect explains how the aversion develops more strongly for stimuli that cause nausea than other stimuli. This is considered an adaptive trait or survival mechanism that enables the organism to avoid poisonous substances (e.g., poisonous berries) before they cause harm. The aversion reduces consuming the same substance (or something that tastes similar) in the future, thus avoiding poisoning.

Studies on conditioned taste aversion that involved irradiating rats were conducted in the 1950s by John Garcia, leading to it sometimes being called the Garcia effect.

Conditioned taste aversion can occur when sickness is merely coincidental to, and not caused by, the substance consumed. For example, a person who becomes very sick after consuming tequila-and-orange-juice cocktails may then become averse to the taste of orange juice, even though the sickness was caused by the over-consumption of alcohol. Under these circumstances, conditioned taste aversion is sometimes known as the sauce-bearnaise syndrome, a term coined by Seligman and Hager.

== Garcia's study ==
While studying the effects of radiation on various behaviors in the mid to late 1950s, Garcia noticed that rats developed an aversion to substances consumed prior to being irradiated. To examine this, Garcia put together a study in which three groups of rats were given sweetened water followed by either no radiation, mild radiation, or strong radiation. When rats were subsequently given a choice between sweetened water and regular tap water, rats who had been exposed to radiation drank much less sweetened water than those who had not.

This finding was surprising in that the aversion could occur after just a single trial and with a long delay between the stimuli. Most research at the time found that learning required multiple trials and shorter latencies. Many scientists were skeptical of Garcia's findings because they did not follow a broad array of previous results: that any neutral stimulus could be made aversive or reinforcing by pairing it with aversive or reinforcing stimuli. However, Garcia's results were clear, and replicated in different settings. A compelling experiment compared pairing of nausea with taste, versus pairing with light and sound stimuli ("bright noisy water"). Strong aversions developed to the taste stimuli but not to the light and sound. This demonstrated that the particular stimulus used in conditioning can matter: some stimulus pairings generate stronger aversion than others. Conditioned taste aversion can also be species-specific, which was also a challenge to previous results.

== Overview ==
Taste aversion does not require cognitive awareness to develop—that is, the organism does not have to consciously recognize a connection between the perceived cause (the taste) and effect (the aversion). In fact, the subject may hope to enjoy the substance, but the aversion persists.

Also, taste aversion generally requires only one trial. Classical conditioning requires several pairings of the neutral stimulus (e.g., a ringing bell) with the unconditioned stimulus (i.e., meat powder) before the neutral stimulus elicits the response (salivation). With taste aversion, the food can become aversive after just one pairing with sickness. In addition, respondent behavior generally requires brief intervals between the neutral stimulus and the unconditioned stimulus. With taste aversion, however, the hotdog a person eats at lunch may become aversive as a result of the vomiting that person has in the evening.

If the flavor has been encountered before the organism becomes ill, the effect will not be as strong or will not be present. This quality is called latent inhibition. Conditioned taste aversion is often used in laboratories to study gustation and learning in rats.

Aversions can be developed to odors as well as tastes.

Common vampire bats (Desmodus rotundus) do not learn taste aversions despite being closely related to other species of bats that do. The diet of common vampire bats only consists of vertebrate blood and therefore it is hypothesized that the development of a taste aversion to their only food source would not be advantageous for these animals.

== In humans ==
Taste aversion is common in humans. When humans eat bad food (e.g., spoiled meat) and get sick, they may later find that particular food aversive. The food does not have to cause the sickness for it to become aversive. A human who eats sushi for the first time and who happens to come down with an unrelated stomach virus may still develop an aversion to sushi. Even something as obvious as riding a roller coaster (causing nausea) after eating the sushi will influence the development of taste aversion to sushi. Humans might also develop aversions to certain types of alcoholic beverages because of vomiting during intoxication. This is the mechanism of disulfiram, a drug used to treat alcohol dependence by inhibiting aldehyde dehydrogenase which causes a rapid buildup of the hangover-causing compound acetaldehyde when consuming alcoholic beverages, thereby pairing a negative stimulus with consumption of alcohol. Certain other cephalosporin antibiotic medications, like cefotetan and cefazolin are metabolized to a compound that has similar effects at blocking acetaldehyde metabolism, 1-methylthiotetrazole (1-MTT), and can cause the same hangovers upon alcohol ingestion.

Taste aversion is a common problem with chemotherapy patients, who become nauseated because of the drug therapy and then develop aversions to food.

== Applications ==
Taste aversion has been demonstrated in a wide variety of both captive and free-ranging predators. In these studies, animals that consume a bait laced with an undetectable dose of an aversion agent avoid both baits and live prey with the same taste and scent as the baits. When predators detect the aversion agent in the baits, they quickly form aversions to the baits, but discriminate between these and different-tasting live prey.

== Stimulus generalization ==
Stimulus generalization is another learning phenomenon that can be illustrated by conditioned taste aversion. This phenomenon demonstrates that we tend to develop aversions even to types of food that resemble the foods which caused us illness. For example, if one eats an orange and gets sick, one might also avoid eating tangerines and clementines because they smell and taste similar to oranges.

Stimulus generalization applies beyond food tastes and aversion. Trauma and aversive events of all kinds create aversion and generalizations to other events. And like taste aversion, the generalization may or not be conscious. Stimulus generalization is a factor in "superstitious behavior", racism and prejudice of all kinds.

== Compared with taste avoidance ==
Although the terms "taste avoidance" and "taste aversion" are often used interchangeably, studies with rats indicate they are not necessarily synonymous. A rat may avoid a food yet still enjoy it and choose it over others. Rats tested with a sucrose solution paired with a drug that gave positive, euphoric effects, such as amphetamine, cocaine, and morphine emitted positive reactions to the drugs, yet they avoided approaching these solutions. When one of these solutions was placed next to another solution the rats had been given a conditioned taste aversion, the rat would choose the aversive. Scientists theorize that in terms of evolution, because rats are unable to vomit and immediately purge toxins, rats have developed a strong "first line of defense", which is their sense of taste and smell. This further shows the importance of taste and the correlation between taste and any change in physiological state, whether it be good or bad. Because rats rely upon taste and pairing it with a reaction rather than relying on later responses that involve the gastrointestinal tract, taste avoidance is just as prevalent as taste aversion, though the two don't necessarily go hand in hand.

== See also ==
- Pavlovian-instrumental transfer
- Poison shyness
