= Elizabeth Berridge =

Elizabeth Berridge may refer to:

- Elizabeth Berridge (actress) (born 1962), American actress
- Elizabeth Berridge (novelist) (1919–2009), British author
- Elizabeth Berridge, Baroness Berridge (born 1972), former Director of the Conservative Christian Fellowship
