= Pavlovian-instrumental transfer =

Psychological phenomenon

Pavlovian-instrumental transfer (PIT) is a psychological phenomenon that occurs when a conditioned stimulus (CS, also known as a "cue") that has been associated with rewarding or aversive stimuli via classical conditioning alters motivational salience and operant behavior. Two distinct forms of Pavlovian-instrumental transfer have been identified in humans and other animals – specific PIT and general PIT – with unique neural substrates mediating each type. In relation to rewarding stimuli, specific PIT occurs when a CS is associated with a specific rewarding stimulus through classical conditioning and subsequent exposure to the CS enhances an operant response that is directed toward the same reward with which it was paired (i.e., it promotes approach behavior). General PIT occurs when a CS is paired with one reward and it enhances an operant response that is directed toward a different rewarding stimulus.

An example of specific PIT, as described by a neuroscience review on Pavlovian-instrumental transfer from 2013, is as follows:

In a typical experimental scenario a rat is trained to associate a sound (CS) with the delivery of food. Later, the rat undergoes an instrumental training where it learns to press a lever to get some food (without the sound being present). Finally, the rat is presented again with the opportunity to press the lever, this time both in the presence and absence of the sound. The results show that the rat will press the lever more in the presence of the sound than without, even if the sound has not been previously paired with lever pressing. The Pavlovian sound-food association learned in the first phase has somehow transferred to the instrumental situation, hence the name 'Pavlovian-instrumental transfer'.

== Specific and general transfer ==
In relation to rewarding stimuli, specific PIT occurs when a CS is associated with a specific rewarding stimulus through classical conditioning and subsequent exposure to the CS enhances an operant response that is directed toward the same reward with which it was paired (i.e., it promotes approach behavior). General PIT occurs when a CS is paired with one reward and it enhances an operant response that is directed toward a different rewarding stimulus. Neurobiological state factors (e.g., appetite and satiety states, stress level, drug states such as intoxication and withdrawal, etc.), and particularly the motivational state of an animal, strongly affect the amount of appetitive motivational salience (i.e., incentive salience) that a reward cue (Note: A "reward cue" is a conditioned stimulus (CS) that has been paired with a rewarding stimulus via classical conditioning.) confers to an associated rewarding stimulus via Pavlovian-instrumental transfer. Acute stress amplifies the motivational salience that reward cues confer to rewarding stimuli through both specific and general PIT; however, chronic stress reduces the motivational impact reward cues.

Specific PIT and general PIT also occur with aversive stimuli and are defined analogously. Specific PIT with an aversive stimulus occurs when a CS is paired with an aversive stimulus and subsequent exposure to the CS enhances an operant response that is directed away from the aversive stimulus with which it was paired (i.e., it promotes escape and avoidance behavior). General PIT with an aversive stimulus occurs when a CS is paired with one aversive stimulus and it enhances an operant response that is directed away from a different aversive stimulus.

== Neural substrates ==
Based on studies of rats that involved PIT with rewards, it has been found that specific PIT is mediated by the nucleus accumbens shell and basolateral amygdala, while general PIT is mediated by the nucleus accumbens core and central amygdala. Studies on humans, which employed neuroimaging during PIT experiments with rewards, appear to be consistent with these findings.

== Clinical significance ==
=== Addiction ===
Due to the effect of reward cues and Pavlovian-instrumental transfer on the amplification of incentive salience for rewarding stimuli, PIT is believed to be one of the mechanisms responsible for producing "cue-triggered wanting", or craving, for a drug that occurs when an individual with a drug addiction is exposed to drug cues (Note: Drug cues are environmental contexts, situations, and objects which have been repeatedly associated with drug use through classical conditioning.) even after long periods of abstinence. For example, anti-drug agencies previously used posters with images of drug paraphernalia – which is a type of drug cue – as an attempt to show the dangers of drug use. However, such posters are no longer used because of the effect of incentive salience in causing cravings and relapse upon sight of the stimuli illustrated in the posters.

=== Dieting ===
The sight or smell of food which one has consumed and enjoyed in the past can elicit hunger (i.e., the motivation to eat) in humans, an effect which is presumably mediated through PIT. In PIT experiments with rats, the presentation of a conditioned stimulus which has been paired with food has been shown to increase instrumental actions that have been reinforced by food, such as pressing a lever which leads to the delivery of a food pellet.

== See also ==
- Associative learning
- Classical conditioning
- Operant conditioning
- Motivational salience
- Reward system
