= Harold Berridge =

British engineer

Major Harold Berridge CIE OBE (13 April 1872 – 17 June 1949) was a British civil engineer and mechanical engineer.

== Early life and education ==
Berridge was born in Leicester on 13 April 1872, the eldest son of Henry and Maud Berridge (née Timperley). His father was the captain, successively, of the clipper ships Walmer Castle, Highflyer and Superb for Green's Blackwall Line. Maud accompanied her husband on four voyages to Australia, in 1869 on Walmer Castle and in 1880, 1882, 1883 and 1886 on Superb; on the 1880 voyage, Harold Berridge and his younger brother Jesse (1874–1966) accompanied their parents.

Educated at the City of London School, Harold Berridge undertook a short apprenticeship in 1888 with Messrs J. J. Lane Ltd, Phoenix Engine Works, London. He was then employed as a clerk in the office and workshop of Messrs H. Wallace & Company, manufacturing chemists. In the 1891 Census he was listed with his occupation and residing with his brother and widowed mother at 2 Avenue Crescent, Acton, London.

== Engineering career ==
Berridge was apprenticed on 25 May 1892 for three years to Robert Kinipple and William Jaffrey of 3 Victoria Street, civil engineers. In 1895, he was appointed resident engineer of Poole Harbour. He obtained a position in 1897 with John Mowlem & Company as an engineer on the City and South London Railway. From 1898 to 1901, he worked as an agent for W. Hill & Co in Plymouth, and from 1901 to 1902 as an agent for Scott & Middleton at Pallion Shipyard.

In 1902, he went to the United States as assistant superintendent of the construction of the New York City approaches of the Hudson and Manhattan Railroad (now PATH) tunnel under the Hudson River.

In 1904, Berridge went to Aden as chief engineer to the Aden Port Trust. He held this post until his retirement in 1924. In 1917, he was commissioned into the part-time Indian Defence Force as a major and commandant of the 45th Aden Rifles, and from 1918 to 1920 he served as garrison engineer and deputy assistant director of railways with the Aden Field Force. He was mentioned in dispatches twice and appointed Companion of the Order of the Indian Empire (CIE) and Officer of the Order of the British Empire (OBE) in the 1919 Indian War Honours. He relinquished his commission in September 1920, but was permitted to retain his rank.

Returning to civilian life, he acted as assistant chief engineer for the Tata Power Company Ltd, for whom he was engaged in the construction of the Mulshi Dam from 1920 to 1924. Berridge retired back to England, where he worked as assistant to the administrator of housing development schemes of London County Council from 1925 to 1931, being responsible for the construction of some 10,000 houses.

== Family ==
Berridge married twice, firstly in 1896 to Alice Harriet Lyle (1874–1934). They were the parents of two sons, Harold Henry (1897–1978) and Basil (1902–1960). Five months after his wife's death, he married her former nurse, Phyllis Doyle.

Berridge died on 17 June 1949 at Sutton, Surrey.
