= Basolateral amygdala =

Parts of the human brain

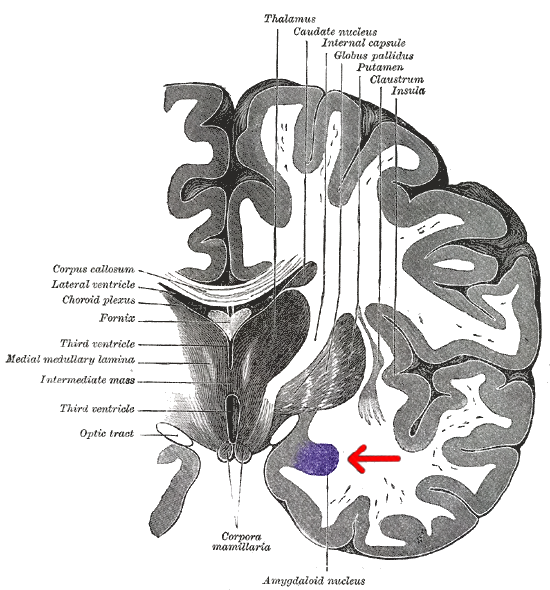
- Coronal section of brain through intermediate mass of third ventricle. Amygdala is shown in purple.

Details
- Part of: Amygdala

Identifiers
- Acronym(s): BL
- NeuroNames: 244
- NeuroLex ID: BIRNLEX:2679
- FMA: 84609

The basolateral amygdala, or basolateral complex, or basolateral nuclear complex consists of the lateral, basal and accessory-basal nuclei of the amygdala. The lateral nuclei receives the majority of sensory information, which arrives directly from the temporal lobe structures, including the hippocampus and primary auditory cortex. The basolateral amygdala also receives dense neuromodulatory inputs from ventral tegmental area (VTA), locus coeruleus (LC), and basal forebrain, whose integrity are important for associative learning. The information is then processed by the basolateral complex and is sent as output to the central nucleus of the amygdala. This is how most emotional arousal is formed in mammals.

== Function ==
The amygdala has several different nuclei and internal pathways; the basolateral complex (or basolateral amygdala), the central nucleus, and the cortical nucleus are the most well-known. Each of these has a unique function and purpose within the amygdala.

=== Fear response ===
The basolateral amygdala and nucleus accumbens shell together mediate specific Pavlovian-instrumental transfer, a phenomenon in which a classically conditioned stimulus modifies operant behavior. One of the main functions of the basolateral complex is to stimulate the fear response. The fear system is intended to avoid pain or injury. For this reason the responses must be quick, and reflex-like. To achieve this, the "low-road" or a bottom-up process is used to generate a response to stimuli that are potentially hazardous. The stimulus reaches the thalamus, and information is passed to the lateral nucleus, then the basolateral system, and immediately to the central nucleus where a response is then formed. There is no conscious cognition involved in these responses. Other non-threatening stimuli are processed via the "high road" or a top-down form of processing. In this case, the stimulus input reaches the sensory cortex first, leading to more conscious involvement in the response. In immediately threatening situations, the fight-or-flight response is reflexive, and conscious thought processing doesn't occur until later.

An important process that occurs in basolateral amygdala is consolidation of cued fear memory. One proposed molecular mechanism for this process is collaboration of M_{1}-Muscarinic receptors, D_{5} receptors and beta-2 adrenergic receptors to redundantly activate phospholipase C, which inhibits the activity of KCNQ channels that conduct inhibitory M current. The neuron then becomes more excitable and the consolidation of memory is enhanced.

=== Pain memory ===
Distinct ensembles of neurons within the basolateral amygdala play a role in encoding associative memories and the response to painful stimuli. The ensemble activated in response to noxious stimuli are of particular interest for targeting treatments of chronic pain and cold allodynia. When neurons within this ensemble are silenced in a rodent model the affective component of pain is essentially erased, while a robust reflex response is maintained. This is thought to implicate the basolateral amygdala in assigning a "pain tag" to valence information which may intrinsically encode that there is a priority to engage in pain-protective behaviors.
