= Elizabeth Berridge (novelist) =

British novelist and critic

Elizabeth Berridge, date unknown

Elizabeth Eileen Berridge (3 December 1919 – 2 December 2009) was a British novelist and critic, most famous for the novels Across the Common, which won the 1964 Yorkshire Post Novel of the Year Award, and Touch and Go.

== Early and personal life ==
Berridge was from South London, the daughter of a land agent. She had some Welsh heritage. Berridge attended Clapham High School for Girls and was also educated in Geneva.

In 1940, Berridge married Reginald Moore, bookseller and founder of the literary magazine Modern Reading. The couple moved to Montgomeryshire, Wales during World War II, where they had their two children, a son Lawrence and daughter Karen, before returning to London. After the death of her husband in 1990, Berridge traveled extensively.

== Publications ==
- The Story of Stanley Brent (1945). Novella
- House of Defence (1945). Novel
- Selected Stories (1947); reissued by Persephone Books as Tell It to a Stranger (2000).
- Be Clean, Be Tidy (1949); in U.S. titled It Won't Be Flowers. Novel
- Upon Several Occasions (1953). Novel
- Rose under Glass (1961). Novel
- Across the Common (1964); in U.S. Lancer paperback edition titled The Violent Past (1968). Novel
- Sing Me Who You Are (1967). Novel
- That Surprising Summer (1972). For children
- The Barretts of Hope End: The Early Diary of Elizabeth Barrett Browning (editor) (1974).
- Family Matters: Sixteen Stories (1980).
- Run for Home (1981). For children
- People at Play (1982). Novel
- Touch and Go (1995). Novel
