= William Berridge (cricketer, born 1892) =

English cricketer

Personal information
- Full name: William Berridge
- Born: 7 September 1892; Leicester, Leicestershire, England
- Died: 1 April 1968 (aged 75); Leicester, Leicestershire, England
- Batting: Right-handed
- Bowling: Right-arm medium

Domestic team information
- Years: Team
- 1923–1924: Leicestershire

Career statistics
Competition	First-class
Matches	13
Runs scored	146
Batting average	6.95
100s/50s	–/–
Top score	33
Balls bowled	30
Wickets	–
Bowling average	–
5 wickets in innings	–
10 wickets in match	–
Best bowling	–
Catches/stumpings	5/–
- Source: Cricinfo, 13 February 2013

William Berridge (7 September 1892 – 1 April 1968) was an English cricketer. Berridge was a right-handed batsman who bowled right-arm medium pace. He was born in Leicester, Leicestershire.

Berridge made his first-class debut for Leicestershire against Kent at Aylestone Road in the 1923 County Championship, with him making a further first-class appearance in that season against Gloucestershire. The following season he made eleven first-class appearances in the 1924 County Championship, the last of which came against Warwickshire. In his thirteen first-class matches for Leicestershire, Berridge scored 146 runs at an average of 6.95, with a high score of 33.

He died at the city on 1 April 1968.
