= William Berridge (cricketer, born 1894) =

English cricketer

William Claude Morpott Berridge (2 December 1894 – 25 February 1973) was an English cricketer active from 1914 to 1922 who played for Leicestershire. He was born in Enderby, Leicestershire, and died in Oxshott. He appeared in 23 first-class matches as a righthanded batsman who bowled right arm slow medium. He scored 411 runs with a highest score of 61 and took 30 wickets with a best performance of five for 58.
