= Pleasure =

Experience that feels good or is enjoyable

Pleasure is an experience that feels good, that involves the enjoyment of something. It contrasts with pain or suffering, which are forms of feeling bad. It is closely related to value, desire and action: humans and other conscious animals find pleasure enjoyable, positive or worthy of seeking. A great variety of activities may be experienced as pleasurable, such as eating, having sex, listening to music or playing games. Pleasure is part of various other mental states such as ecstasy, euphoria and flow. Happiness and well-being are closely related to pleasure but not identical with it. There is no general agreement as to whether pleasure should be understood as a sensation, a quality of experiences, an attitude to experiences or otherwise. Pleasure plays a central role in the family of philosophical theories known as hedonism.

== Definition ==
"Pleasure" refers to experience that feels good, that involves the enjoyment of something. The term is primarily used in association with sensory pleasures like the enjoyment of sex or food. But in its most general sense, it includes all types of positive or pleasant experiences including the enjoyment of sports, seeing a beautiful sunset or engaging in an intellectually satisfying activity.

Pleasure contrasts with pain or suffering, which are forms of feeling bad. Both pleasure and pain come in degrees and have been thought of as a dimension going from positive degrees through a neutral point to negative degrees. This assumption is important for the possibility of comparing and aggregating the degrees of pleasure of different experiences, for example, in order to perform the Utilitarian calculus.

=== Related concepts ===
The concept of pleasure is similar but not identical to the concepts of well-being and of happiness. These terms are used in overlapping ways, but their meanings tend to come apart in technical contexts like philosophy or psychology. Pleasure refers to a certain type of experience while well-being is about what is good for a person. Many philosophers agree that pleasure is good for a person and therefore is a form of well-being. But there may be other things besides or instead of pleasure that constitute well-being, like health, virtue, knowledge or the fulfillment of desires. On some conceptions, happiness is identified with "the individual's balance of pleasant over unpleasant experience". Life satisfaction theories, on the other hand, hold that happiness involves having the right attitude towards one's life as a whole. Pleasure may have a role to play in this attitude, but it is not identical to happiness.

Pleasure is closely related to value, desire, motivation and right action. There is broad agreement that pleasure is valuable in some sense.

== Sources and types ==
=== Sources ===
Many pleasurable experiences are associated with satisfying basic biological drives, such as eating, exercise, hygiene, sleep, and sex. Pleasure may come from the enjoyment of food, sex, sports, seeing a beautiful sunset or engaging in an intellectually satisfying activity. The appreciation of cultural artifacts and activities such as art, music, dancing, and literature is often pleasurable.

=== Types ===
Pleasure is sometimes subdivided into fundamental pleasures that are closely related to survival (food, sex, and social belonging) and higher-order pleasures (e.g., viewing art and altruism).

Jeremy Bentham listed 14 kinds of pleasure; sense, wealth, skill, amity, a good name, power, piety, benevolence, malevolence, memory, imagination, expectation, pleasures dependent on association, and the pleasures of relief.

Some commentators see 'complex pleasures' including wit and sudden realisation, and some see a wide range of pleasurable feelings.

Nick Bostrom listed 3 types of pleasure;

- pleasant or voluptuous bodily sensations.
- thrills from high-energy socialising, consumerism, and indulgence.
- positive hedonic tone, meaning an unmediated liking of the ways things present in the moment.

== Theories of pleasure ==
Theories of pleasure try to determine what pleasurable experiences have in common, what is essential to them. They are traditionally divided into

- quality theories; that pleasure is a quality of pleasurable experiences themselves,
- attitude theories; that pleasure is in some sense external to the experience since it depends on the subject's attitude to the experience. An alternative terminology refers to these theories as phenomenalism and intentionalism.
- hybrid or dispositional theories, that incorporate elements of both quality and attitude approaches.

=== Quality theories ===
In everyday language, the term "pleasure" is primarily associated with sensory pleasures like the enjoyment of food or sex. One traditionally important quality-theory closely follows this association by holding that pleasure is a sensation. On the simplest version of the sensation theory, whenever we experience pleasure there is a distinctive pleasure-sensation present. So a pleasurable experience of eating chocolate involves a sensation of the taste of chocolate together with a pleasure-sensation. An obvious shortcoming of this theory is that many impressions may be present at the same time. For example, there may be an itching sensation as well while eating the chocolate. But this account cannot explain why the enjoyment is linked to the taste of the chocolate and not to the itch. Another problem is due to the fact that sensations are usually thought of as localized somewhere in the body. But considering the pleasure of seeing a beautiful sunset, there seems to be no specific region in the body at which we experience this pleasure.

These problems can be avoided by felt-quality-theories, which see pleasure not as a sensation but as an aspect qualifying sensations or other mental phenomena. As an aspect, pleasure is dependent on the mental phenomenon it qualifies, it cannot be present on its own. Since the link to the enjoyed phenomenon is already built into the pleasure, it solves the problem faced by sensation theories to explain how this link comes about. It also captures the intuition that pleasure is usually pleasure of something: enjoyment of drinking a milkshake or of playing chess but not just pure or object-less enjoyment. According to this approach, pleasurable experiences differ in content (drinking a milkshake, playing chess) but agree in feeling or hedonic tone. Pleasure can be localized, but only to the extent that the impression it qualifies is localized.

One objection to both the sensation theory and the felt-quality theory is that there is no one quality shared by all pleasure-experiences. The force of this objection comes from the intuition that the variety of pleasure-experiences is just too wide to point out one quality shared by all, for example, the quality shared by enjoying a milkshake and enjoying a chess game. One way for quality theorists to respond to this objection is by pointing out that the hedonic tone of pleasure-experiences is not a regular quality but a higher-order quality. As an analogy, a vividly green thing and a vividly red thing do not share a regular color property but they share "vividness" as a higher-order property.

=== Attitude theories ===
Attitude theories propose to analyze pleasure in terms of attitudes to experiences. So to enjoy the taste of chocolate it is not sufficient to have the corresponding experience of the taste. Instead, the subject has to have the right attitude to this taste for pleasure to arise. This approach captures the intuition that a second person may have exactly the same taste-experience but not enjoy it since the relevant attitude is lacking. Various attitudes have been proposed for the type of attitude responsible for pleasure, but historically the most influential version assigns this role to desires. On this account, pleasure is linked to experiences that fulfill a desire had by the experiencer. So the difference between the first and the second person in the example above is that only the first person has a corresponding desire directed at the taste of chocolate.

One important argument against this version is that while it is often the case that we desire something first and then enjoy it, this cannot always be the case. In fact, often the opposite seems to be true: we have to learn first that something is enjoyable before we start to desire it. This objection can be partially avoided by holding that it does not matter whether the desire was there before the experience but that it only matters what we desire while the experience is happening. This variant, originally held by Henry Sidgwick, has recently been defended by Chris Heathwood, who holds that an experience is pleasurable if the subject of the experience wants the experience to occur for its own sake while it is occurring. But this version faces a related problem akin to the Euthyphro dilemma: it seems that we usually desire things because they are enjoyable, not the other way round. So desire theories would be mistaken about the direction of explanation. Another argument against desire theories is that desire and pleasure can come apart: we can have a desire for things that are not enjoyable and we can enjoy things without desiring to do so.

=== Dispositional theories ===
Dispositional theories try to account for pleasure in terms of dispositions, often by including insights from both the quality theories and the attitude theories. One way to combine these elements is to hold that pleasure consists in being disposed to desire an experience in virtue of the qualities of this experience. Some of the problems of the regular desire theory can be avoided this way since the disposition does not need to be realized for there to be pleasure, thereby taking into account that desire and pleasure can come apart.

== Roles in philosophy ==
=== Hedonism ===
Pleasure plays a central role in theories from various areas of philosophy. Such theories are usually grouped together under the label "hedonism". Axiological hedonists hold that pleasure is the only thing that has intrinsic value. Many desires are concerned with pleasure. Psychological hedonism is the thesis that all our actions aim at increasing pleasure and avoiding pain. Freud's pleasure principle ties pleasure to motivation and action by holding that there is a strong psychological tendency to seek pleasure and to avoid pain. Classical utilitarianism connects pleasure to ethics in stating that whether an action is right depends on the pleasure it produces: it should maximize the sum-total of pleasure.

=== Ethics ===
Pleasure is related not just to how we actually act, but also to how we ought to act, which belongs to the field of ethics. Ethical hedonism takes the strongest position on this relation in stating that considerations of increasing pleasure and decreasing pain fully determine what we should do or which action is right. Ethical hedonist theories can be classified in relation to whose pleasure should be increased. According to the egoist version, each agent should only aim at maximizing her own pleasure. This position is usually not held in very high esteem. Utilitarianism, on the other hand, is a family of altruist theories that are more respectable in the philosophical community. Within this family, classical utilitarianism draws the closest connection between pleasure and right action by holding that the agent should maximize the sum-total of everyone's happiness. This sum-total includes the agent's pleasure as well, but only as one factor among many.

=== Value ===
Pleasure is intimately connected to value as something that is desirable and worth seeking. According to axiological hedonism, it is the only thing that has intrinsic value or is good in itself. This position entails that things other than pleasure, like knowledge, virtue or money, only have instrumental value: they are valuable because or to the extent that they produce pleasure but lack value otherwise. Within the scope of axiological hedonism, there are two competing theories about the exact relation between pleasure and value: quantitative hedonism and qualitative hedonism. Quantitative hedonists, following Jeremy Bentham, hold that the specific content or quality of a pleasure-experience is not relevant to its value, which only depends on its quantitative features: intensity and duration. On this account, an experience of intense pleasure of indulging in food and sex is worth more than an experience of subtle pleasure of looking at fine art or of engaging in a stimulating intellectual conversation. Qualitative hedonists, following John Stuart Mill, object to this version on the grounds that it threatens to turn axiological hedonism into a "philosophy of swine". Instead, they argue that the quality is another factor relevant to the value of a pleasure-experience, for example, that the lower pleasures of the body are less valuable than the higher pleasures of the mind.

=== Beauty ===
A very common element in many conceptions of beauty is its relation to pleasure. Aesthetic hedonism makes this relation part of the definition of beauty by holding that there is a necessary connection between pleasure and beauty, e.g. that for an object to be beautiful is for it to cause pleasure or that the experience of beauty is always accompanied by pleasure. The pleasure due to beauty does not need to be pure, i.e. exclude all unpleasant elements. Instead, beauty can involve mixed pleasure, for example, in the case of a beautifully tragic story. We take pleasure from many things that are not beautiful, which is why beauty is usually defined in terms of a special type of pleasure: aesthetic or disinterested pleasure. A pleasure is disinterested if it is indifferent to the existence of the beautiful object. For example, the joy of looking at a beautiful landscape would still be valuable if it turned out that this experience was an illusion, which would not be true if this joy was due to seeing the landscape as a valuable real estate opportunity. Opponents of aesthetic hedonism have pointed out that despite commonly occurring together, there are cases of beauty without pleasure. For example, a cold jaded critic may still be a good judge of beauty due to her years of experience but lack the joy that initially accompanied her work. A further question for hedonists is how to explain the relation between beauty and pleasure. This problem is akin to the Euthyphro dilemma: is something beautiful because we enjoy it or do we enjoy it because it is beautiful? Identity theorists solve this problem by denying that there is a difference between beauty and pleasure: they identify beauty, or the appearance of it, with the experience of aesthetic pleasure.

== History of analysis of pleasure ==
=== Hellenistic philosophy ===
The ancient Cyrenaics posited pleasure as the universal aim for all people. Later, Epicurus defined the highest pleasure as aponia (the absence of pain), and pleasure as "freedom from pain in the body and freedom from turmoil in the soul". According to Cicero (or rather his character Torquatus) Epicurus also believed that pleasure was the chief good and pain the chief evil. The Pyrrhonist philosopher Aenesidemus claimed that following Pyrrhonism's prescriptions for philosophical skepticism produced pleasure.

=== Medieval philosophy ===
In the 12th century, Razi's Treatise of the Self and the Spirit (Kitab al Nafs Wa’l Ruh) analyzed different types of pleasure- sensuous and intellectual, and explained their relations with one another. He concludes that human needs and desires are endless, and "their satisfaction is by definition impossible."

=== Schopenhauer ===
The 19th-century German philosopher Arthur Schopenhauer understood pleasure as a negative sensation, one that negates the usual existential condition of suffering.

== Psychology ==
Pleasure is often regarded as a bipolar construct, meaning that the two ends of the spectrum from pleasure to suffering are mutually exclusive. That is part of the circumplex model of affect. Yet, some lines of research suggest that people do experience pleasure and suffering at the same time, giving rise to so-called mixed feelings. Pleasure is considered one of the core dimensions of emotion. It can be described as the positive evaluation that forms the basis for several more elaborate evaluations such as "agreeable" or "nice". As such, pleasure is an affect and not an emotion, as it forms one component of several different emotions. The clinical condition of being unable to experience pleasure from usually enjoyable activities is called anhedonia. An active aversion to obtaining pleasure is called hedonophobia.

=== Pleasure and belief ===
The degree to which something or someone is experienced as pleasurable not only depends on its objective attributes (appearance, sound, taste, texture, etc.), but on beliefs about its history, about the circumstances of its creation, about its rarity, fame, or price, and on other non-intrinsic attributes, such as the social status or identity it conveys. For example, a sweater that has been worn by a celebrity is more desired than an otherwise identical sweater that has not, though considerably less so if it has been washed.

=== Motivation and behavior ===
Pleasure-seeking behavior is a common phenomenon and may indeed dominate our conduct at times. The thesis of psychological hedonism generalizes this insight by holding that all our actions aim at increasing pleasure and avoiding pain. This is usually understood in combination with egoism, i.e. that each person only aims at her own happiness. Our actions rely on beliefs about what causes pleasure. False beliefs may mislead us and thus our actions may fail to result in pleasure, but even failed actions are motivated by considerations of pleasure, according to psychological hedonism. The paradox of hedonism states that pleasure-seeking behavior commonly fails also in another way. It asserts that being motivated by pleasure is self-defeating in the sense that it leads to less actual pleasure than following other motives.

Sigmund Freud formulated his pleasure principle in order to account for the effect pleasure has on our behavior. It states that there is a strong, inborn tendency of our mental life to seek immediate gratification whenever an opportunity presents itself. This tendency is opposed by the reality principle, which constitutes a learned capacity to delay immediate gratification in order to take the real consequences of our actions into account. Freud also described the pleasure principle as a positive feedback mechanism that motivates the organism to recreate the situation it has just found pleasurable, and to avoid past situations that caused pain.

=== Cognitive biases ===
A cognitive bias is a systematic tendency of thinking and judging in a way that deviates from a normative criterion, especially from the demands of rationality. Cognitive biases in regard to pleasure include the peak–end rule, the focusing illusion, the nearness bias and the future bias.

The peak–end rule affects how we remember the pleasantness or unpleasantness of experiences. It states that our overall impression of past events is determined for the most part not by the total pleasure and suffering it contained but by how it felt at its peaks and at its end. For example, the memory of a painful colonoscopy is improved if the examination is extended by three minutes in which the scope is still inside but not moved anymore, resulting in a moderately uncomfortable sensation. This extended colonoscopy, despite involving more pain overall, is remembered less negatively due to the reduced pain at the end. This even increases the likelihood for the patient to return for subsequent procedures. Daniel Kahneman explains this distortion in terms of the difference between two selves: the experiencing self, which is aware of pleasure and pain as they are happening, and the remembering self, which shows the aggregate pleasure and pain over an extended period of time. The distortions due to the peak–end rule happen on the level of the remembering self. Our tendency to rely on the remembering self can often lead us to pursue courses of action that are not in our best self-interest.

A closely related bias is the focusing illusion. The "illusion" occurs when people consider the impact of one specific factor on their overall happiness. They tend to greatly exaggerate the importance of that factor, while overlooking the numerous other factors that would in most cases have a greater impact.

The nearness bias and the future bias are two different forms of violating the principle of temporal neutrality. This principle states that the temporal location of a benefit or a harm is not important for its normative significance: a rational agent should care to the same extent about all parts of their life. The nearness bias, also discussed under the labels "present bias" or "temporal discounting", refers to our tendency to violate temporal neutrality in regards to temporal distance from the present. On the positive side, we prefer pleasurable experiences to be near rather than distant. On the negative side, we prefer painful experiences to be distant rather than near. The future bias refers to our tendency to violate temporal neutrality in regards to the direction of time. On the positive side, we prefer pleasurable experiences to be in the future rather than in the past. On the negative side, we prefer painful experiences to be in the past rather than in the future.

== Reward system ==
=== Pleasure centers ===
Pleasure is a component of reward, but not all rewards are pleasurable (e.g., money does not elicit pleasure unless this response is conditioned). Stimuli that are naturally pleasurable, and therefore attractive, are known as intrinsic rewards, whereas stimuli that are attractive and motivate approach behavior, but are not inherently pleasurable, are termed extrinsic rewards. Extrinsic rewards (e.g., money) are rewarding as a result of a learned association with an intrinsic reward. In other words, extrinsic rewards function as motivational magnets that elicit "wanting", but not "liking" reactions once they have been acquired.

The reward system contains pleasure centers or hedonic hotspots – i.e., brain structures that mediate pleasure or "liking" reactions from intrinsic rewards. As of October 2017, hedonic hotspots have been identified in subcompartments within the nucleus accumbens shell, ventral pallidum, parabrachial nucleus, orbitofrontal cortex (OFC), and insular cortex. The raphe nucleus has also been implicated. The hotspot within the nucleus accumbens shell is located in the rostrodorsal quadrant of the medial shell, while the hedonic coldspot is located in a more posterior region. The posterior ventral pallidum also contains a hedonic hotspot, while the anterior ventral pallidum contains a hedonic coldspot. In rats, microinjections of opioids, endocannabinoids, and orexin are capable of enhancing liking reactions in these hotspots. The hedonic hotspots located in the anterior OFC and posterior insula have been demonstrated to respond to orexin and opioids in rats, as has the overlapping hedonic coldspot in the anterior insula and posterior OFC. On the other hand, the parabrachial nucleus hotspot has only been demonstrated to respond to benzodiazepine receptor agonists.

Hedonic hotspots are functionally linked, in that activation of one hotspot results in the recruitment of the others, as indexed by the induced expression of c-Fos, an immediate early gene. Furthermore, inhibition of one hotspot results in the blunting of the effects of activating another hotspot. Therefore, the simultaneous activation of every hedonic hotspot within the reward system is believed to be necessary for generating the sensation of an intense euphoria.

=== Motivation ===
While all pleasurable stimuli can be seen as rewards, some rewards do not evoke pleasure. Based upon the incentive salience model of reward – the attractive and motivational property of a stimulus that induces approach behavior and consummatory behavior – an intrinsic reward has two components: a "wanting" or desire component that is reflected in approach behavior, and a "liking" or pleasure component that is reflected in consummatory behavior. Some research indicates that similar mesocorticolimbic circuitry is activated by quite diverse pleasures, suggesting a common neural currency. Some commentators opine that our current understanding of how pleasure happens within us remains poor, but that scientific advance gives optimism for future progress.

== Animal pleasure ==
In the past, there has been debate as to whether pleasure is experienced by other animals rather than being an exclusive property of humankind; however, it is now known that animals do experience pleasure, as measured by objective behavioral and neural hedonic responses to pleasurable stimuli.

== See also ==
- False pleasure
- Flow (psychology)
- Gratification
- Leisure
- Recreation
- Orgasm
- Pain and pleasure
- Sadomasochism
- Happiness
