= Ventral pallidum =

Structure within the basal ganglia of the brain

Identifiers
- NeuroNames: 1605
- NeuroLex ID: birnlex_1674
- TA98: A14.1.09.438
- TA2: 5556
- FMA: 77613

The ventral pallidum (VP) is a structure within the basal ganglia of the brain. It is an output nucleus whose fibres project to thalamic nuclei, such as the ventral anterior nucleus, the ventral lateral nucleus, and the medial dorsal nucleus. The VP is a core component of the reward system which forms part of the limbic loop of the basal ganglia, a pathway involved in the regulation of motivational salience, behavior, and emotions. It is involved in addiction.

The VP contains one of the brain's pleasure centers, which mediates the subjective perception of pleasure that results from "consuming" certain rewarding stimuli (e.g., palatable food).

== Anatomy ==
The ventral pallidum lies within the basal ganglia, a group of subcortical nuclei. Along with the external globus pallidus, it is separated from other basal ganglia nuclei by the anterior commissure.

The ventral pallidum contains GABAergic neurons, glutamatergic neurons, and cholinergic neurons that are well conserved across mammals.

== Limbic loop ==
The limbic loop is a functional pathway of the basal ganglia, in which the ventral pallidum is involved. It (and the internal globus pallidus and substantia nigra pars reticulata) receives input from the temporal lobes, and the hippocampus via the ventral striatum. The information is relayed to the medial dorsal and ventral anterior nuclei of the thalamus.

== Role in addiction ==
It is unclear whether the ventral pallidum receives dopaminergic inputs from the ventral tegmental area. The ventral pallidum receives GABAergic inputs from the nucleus accumbens. It acts in part as a relay nucleus from the nucleus accumbens to the medial dorsal nucleus. The nucleus accumbens projects to the medial dorsal nucleus via GABAergic medium spiny neurons. The rewarding effects of addictive drugs are mediated in part through their effect on the VP.

== Additional Sources ==
- Martin J.H. Neuroanatomy Text and Atlas. 3rd Edition 2003: Chapter 14
