= Addiction =

Disorder resulting in compulsive behaviors

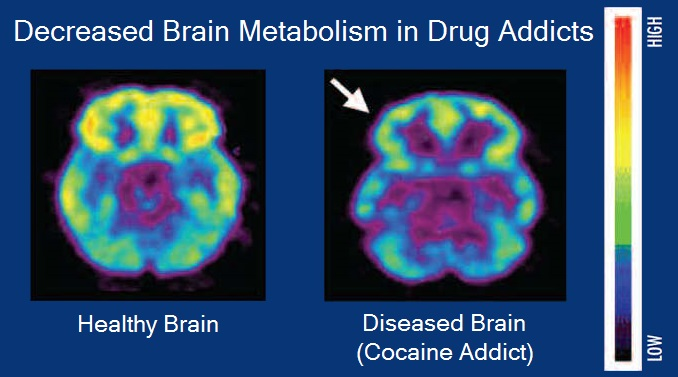
- Brain positron emission tomography images that compare brain metabolism in a healthy individual and an individual with a cocaine addiction
- Specialty: Psychiatry, clinical psychology, toxicology, addiction medicine
- Symptoms: Recurrent compulsion to engage in a rewarding activity despite negative consequences
- Complications: Overdose, suicide, blood-borne infection, cirrhosis, co-occurring psychiatric conditions
- Risk factors: Family history, adverse childhood experiences, attention deficit hyperactivity disorder, post-traumatic stress disorder
- Treatment: Cognitive behavioral therapy, behavior modification, medication
- Frequency: c. 163 million people with a substance use disorder worldwide (2021), including c. 111 million with alcohol use disorder

Addiction is a neuropsychological disorder characterized by a persistent and intense urge to use a drug or engage in a behavior that produces an immediate psychological reward, despite substantial harm and other negative consequences. Repeated substance use produces long-lasting changes in brain networks involved in reward, executive function, stress reactivity and mood. These changes underlie both the intense drive to use a substance and the reduced capacity to control that urge. (Note: In other words, a person cannot control the neurobiological processes that occur in the body in response to using an addictive drug. A person can make a voluntary choice to, for example, start using a drug (or not), or to seek help after becoming addicted. However, resisting the urge to use drug(s) becomes increasingly difficult as addiction worsens. See for detailed discussion.) It is therefore understood as a brain disorder arising from a complex mix of psychosocial and neurobiological factors.

Addiction takes both substance and non-substance forms. Substance addictions include alcoholism, cannabis addiction, amphetamine addiction, cocaine addiction, nicotine addiction, and opioid addiction. The DSM-5-TR recognizes only gambling disorder as a behavioral (non-substance) addiction and lists internet gaming disorder as a condition for further study, while the ICD-11 additionally classifies gaming disorder as a disorder due to addictive behaviors. Other candidate behavioral addictions, and the question of whether food can be addictive, are debated in the research literature but are not recognized in either manual. Across these forms, addiction is defined less by any single symptom than by a pattern: impaired control over the substance or behavior, increasing priority given to it over other activities, and continued use despite harm, accompanied for many substances by tolerance and withdrawal. It carries a substantial risk of further illness and early death, most immediately from overdose, and co-occurring psychiatric conditions are common.

Roughly half of the risk of developing an addiction is genetic: twin and adoption studies estimate the heritability of alcohol use disorder at about 50%, with comparable figures across other substances. Genetic vulnerability is polygenic, reflecting the small combined effects of many common variants rather than any single gene. Environmental contributors include adverse childhood experiences, chronic stress, family and peer influences, socioeconomic constraint and the availability of substances, and adolescence in a period of heightened vulnerability. At the level of mechanism, addiction is described as a recurring cycle in which dopaminergic signaling gives a drug and its associated cues a strong pull on attention and behavior, brain stress systems become overactive as ordinary pleasures are muted, and reduced prefrontal cortex control leaves craving poorly restrained.

Addiction is diagnosed clinically. The DSM-5-TR grades substance use disorder as mild, moderate, or severe and treats severe substance use disorder as synonymous with drug addiction. The ICD-11 instead distinguishes a harmful episode of use, a harmful pattern of use, and dependence. Prevention approaches with the strongest supporting evidence include family skills programs, school-based personal and social skills education, and policies that limit availability and raise price. Addiction is managed as a chronic, relapsing condition, usually combining medication, where an effective one exists, with psychological and social support. Effective medications are available for opioid, alcohol, and tobacco use disorders, but none is approved for stimulant use disorder, for which psychosocial treatment remains the mainstay. Harm reduction measures address the damage associated with continued use. Outcomes vary widely: an estimated 35–54% of people with a substance use disorder reach remission, though typically only after many years. About 163 million people worldwide were estimated to be living with a substance use disorder in 2021, most commonly alcohol use disorder, and drug use was one of only three risk factors whose age-standardized attributable burden rose between 2010 and 2023. Addiction carries substantial economic and social costs, and anthropological and structural accounts situate heavy drug use within cultural norms and unequal distributions of power.

== Signs and symptoms ==
Impaired control over the substance or behavior is the core feature. It appears as using more or for longer than intended, persistent unsuccessful attempts to cut down, and a great deal of time spent obtaining, using, or recovering. Social impairment follows, with failure to meet obligations at work, school, or home, and the abandonment of former activities. Risky use (continuing despite knowledge of physical or psychological harm) and, for many substances, tolerance and withdrawal, complete the picture.

=== Complications ===
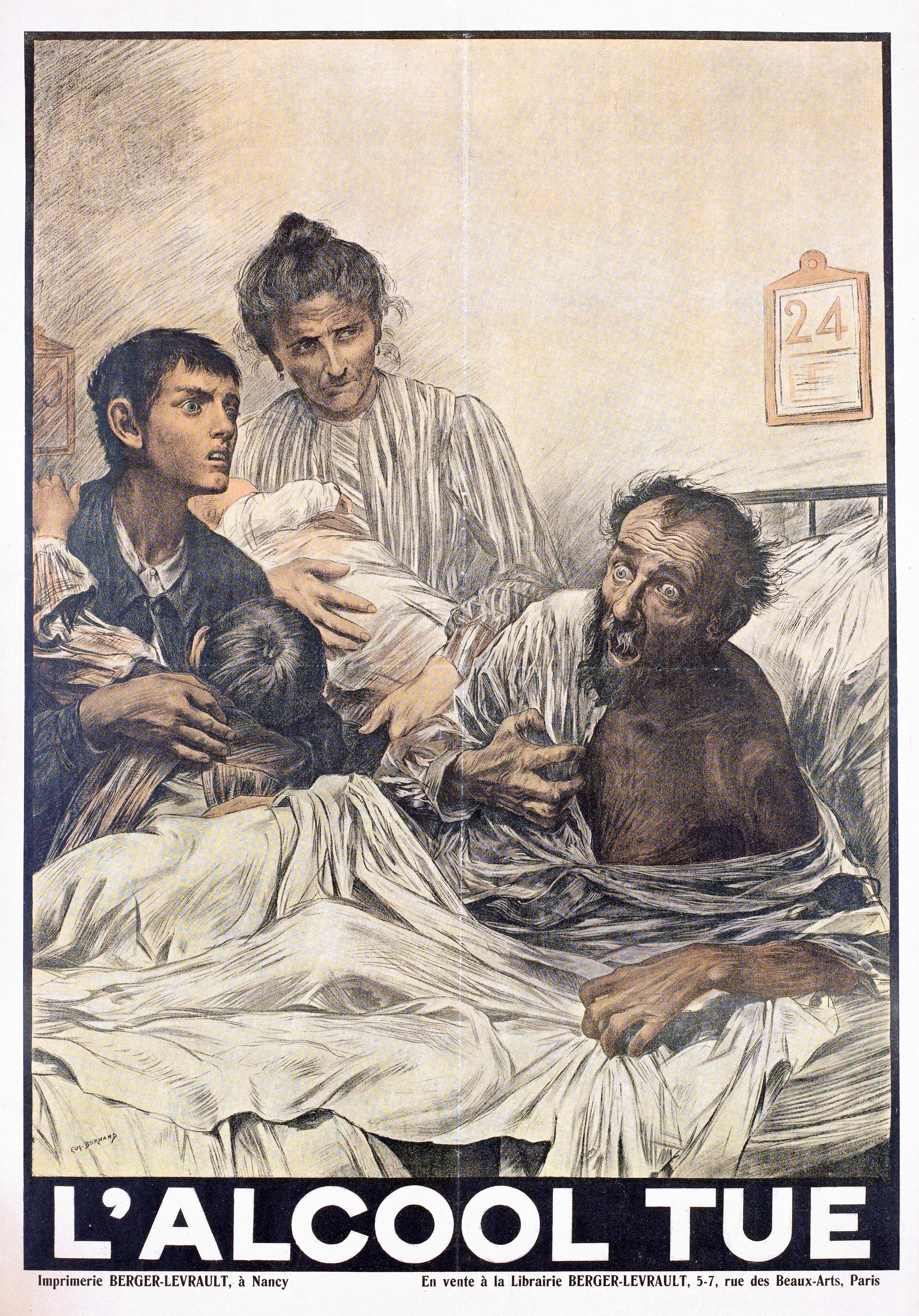
Historical illustration of delirium tremens, the severe confusional state that can accompany alcohol withdrawal.

Addiction carries a substantial risk of further illness and of early death. The most immediate danger is overdose, which for opioids and other sedatives acts by suppressing breathing. Injecting drug use also carries a risk of blood-borne infection, including HIV and hepatitis C. Long-term use damages particular organ systems depending on the substance, with liver cirrhosis and cognitive impairment following sustained heavy drinking and lung disease following tobacco smoking.

Psychiatric conditions frequently co-occur with addiction, and each worsens the outlook for the other, so current guidance is that both be treated at the same time rather than one after the other. People with substance use disorders also die by suicide considerably more often than the general population; a systematic review and meta-analysis of 47 cohort studies estimated the rate at roughly five times that expected, with raised risk found for alcohol, tobacco, opioid, cannabis, and amphetamine use and a stronger association in women than in men, although estimates varied widely between the studies pooled. Loss of pleasure in ordinary activities (anhedonia) is common and is associated with mood disorders.

== Types ==
Addiction is described in two broad forms: substance use disorders, which involve psychoactive drugs, and behavioral addictions, which involve activities that produce reward without a drug. Whether some patterns of eating meet the criteria for addiction remains disputed.

=== Substance use disorder ===
Addiction and dependence glossary
- addiction – a neuropsychological disorder characterized by a persistent and intense urge to use a drug or engage in a behavior that produces natural reward; addictive drug – psychoactive substances that with repeated use are associated with significantly higher rates of substance use disorders, due in large part to the drug's effect on brain reward systems; dependence – an adaptive state associated with a withdrawal syndrome upon cessation of repeated exposure to a stimulus (e.g., drug intake); drug sensitization or reverse tolerance – the escalating effect of a drug resulting from repeated administration at a given dose; drug withdrawal – symptoms that occur upon cessation of repeated drug use; physical dependence – dependence that involves persistent physical–somatic withdrawal symptoms (e.g., delirium tremens and nausea); psychological dependence – dependence that is characterized by emotional-motivational withdrawal symptoms (e.g., anhedonia and anxiety) that affect cognitive functioning.; reinforcing stimuli – stimuli that increase the probability of repeating behaviors paired with them; rewarding stimuli – stimuli that the brain interprets as intrinsically positive and desirable or as something to approach; sensitization – an amplified response to a stimulus resulting from repeated exposure to it; substance use disorder – a condition in which the use of substances leads to clinically and functionally significant impairment or distress; drug tolerance – the diminishing effect of a drug resulting from repeated administration at a given dose

The DSM-5 discourages using the term drug addiction because of its "uncertain definition and its potentially negative connotation" and prefers the term substance use disorder to describe the wide range of the disorder, from a mild form to a severe state of chronically relapsing, compulsive pattern of drug taking.

Substance use disorder is one of the substance-related disorders. It is a long-term, relapsing condition in which a person continues seeking and taking a substance despite the harm it causes. Repeated use alters the brain circuits that handle reward, stress and self-control, which is why cutting down becomes harder over time. The substances most often involved are alcohol, nicotine, cannabis, opioids, cocaine and amphetamines. Use may begin socially, or follow from a prescribed medication. No single theory accounts for substance use disorder on its own. Phenomenological, operant and classical conditioning, cognitive, and cue reactivity models each explain part of it.

=== Behavioral addiction ===
The term behavioral addiction refers to a compulsion to engage in a natural reward despite adverse consequences.

Addiction can exist without psychotropic drugs, an idea that was popularized by psychologist Stanton Peele. These are termed behavioral addictions. Such addictions may be passive or active, but they commonly contain reinforcing features, which are found in most addictions. Sexual behavior, eating, gambling, playing video games, and shopping are all associated with compulsive behaviors in humans and have been shown to activate the mesolimbic pathway and other parts of the reward system. Diagnostic manuals recognize only some of these as disorders. Gambling disorder is the only behavioral addiction classified as a clinical disorder in the DSM-5-TR, which lists internet gaming disorder as a condition requiring further study; the ICD-11 classifies both gambling disorder and gaming disorder as disorders due to addictive behaviors. Compulsive sexual behavior disorder, compulsive buying–shopping disorder, and problematic use of social media are discussed in the research literature as candidate addictive disorders, but are not classified as addictions in either manual.

=== Food addiction ===
Whether food can be addictive is disputed. Neither the DSM-5-TR nor the ICD-11 recognizes a food or eating addiction, and researchers disagree about whether the concept is best framed as an addiction to specific foods, a pattern of disordered eating, or neither. Proponents argue that ultra-processed foods high in refined carbohydrate and fat meet the criteria conventionally used to identify an addictive substance, because processing delivers these nutrients faster and in higher concentrations than they occur in nature. Critics respond that no single constituent has been isolated as the addictive agent, unlike the case for a drug. Most research uses the Yale Food Addiction Scale, which applies the DSM-5 criteria for substance use disorder to eating. Food addiction as measured this way overlaps with, but is not the same as, binge eating disorder: not everyone with an eating disorder screens positive, and not everyone screening positive has a diagnosed eating disorder.

== Causes ==
Several genetic and environmental risk factors exist for developing an addiction. Genetic and environmental risk factors each account for roughly half of an individual's risk for developing an addiction; the contribution from epigenetic risk factors to the total risk is unknown. Even in individuals with a relatively low genetic risk, exposure to sufficiently high doses of an addictive drug for a long period of time (e.g., weeks–months) can result in an addiction.

=== Genetic factors ===
Genetic factors, along with socio-environmental (e.g., psychosocial) factors, have been established as significant contributors to addiction vulnerability. Addiction is substantially heritable. Twin and adoption studies estimate the heritability of alcohol use disorder at approximately 50%, with comparable estimates across other substances. This risk is polygenic: it reflects the combined small effects of many common variants rather than any single gene.

Genome-wide association studies (GWAS) are used to examine genetic associations with dependence, addiction, and drug use, and have begun to map this architecture, and distinguish loci associated with a broad general liability to addiction across substances from loci conferring risk for a specific drug. Individual common variants each contribute only a small increment of risk, so genetic vulnerability is best understood as an aggregate rather than as the effect of any identified gene.

=== Environmental factors ===
Environmental risk factors for addiction are the experiences of an individual during their lifetime that interact with the individual's genetic composition to increase or decrease their vulnerability to addiction. Several environmental factors have been implicated as risk factors for addiction, including various psychosocial stressors. The National Institute on Drug Abuse lists early aggressive behavior, lack of parental supervision, peer substance use, the availability of substances, and poverty as risk factors for substance use among children and adolescents.

Adverse childhood experiences, as defined by the Adverse Childhood Experiences Study, show a graded dose–response association with later harm. A meta-analysis pooling more than 250,000 participants found that people reporting four or more such experiences were at increased risk of every health outcome examined, with the strongest associations for problematic drug use. Chronic childhood exposure to physical, emotional, or sexual abuse, physical or emotional neglect, witnessing violence in the household, or a parent being incarcerated or having a mental illness is associated with substance use disorder in adolescence and adulthood, and people in treatment for addiction report such experiences far more often than the general population. Impaired emotion regulation and reduced impulse control are among the proposed pathways, with substance use adopted as a way of coping, particularly during adolescence. Many children who experience abuse go on to develop an addiction in adolescence or adult life. This pathway towards addiction that is opened through stressful experiences during childhood can be avoided by a change in environmental factors throughout an individual's life and opportunities of professional help.

Social and environmental influences include family dynamics, early and adverse experiences, socioeconomic status, peer networks, and cultural norms. Adverse childhood exposures and maladaptive developmental trajectories are robust environmental influences on the development of alcohol use disorder, and adverse childhood experiences are recognized more generally as a social determinant of vulnerability to substance use disorders. Social networks exert a bidirectional influence, while wider sociocultural factors (including public-health control policies and the social determinants of health) shape both exposure and outcome. Because social risk factors are modifiable, prevention that targets them in childhood and adolescence can reduce the risk of later disorder. Together, these levels of analysis present addiction as a dynamic condition emerging from the interaction of neurobiological processes, individual psychological traits and broader social environments. Social factors act largely through chronic stress, peer modeling, socioeconomic constraint and the availability of substances, influencing both the likelihood of exposure and the risk of escalation or relapse.

==== Stress and addiction ====
Stress contributes to both the development and the persistence of addiction, affecting neurophysiological pathways, decision-making and relapse risk. Acute and chronic stress activate the hypothalamic–pituitary–adrenal axis, raising levels of cortisol and corticotropin-releasing hormone; these changes alter reward processing and increase the motivational pull of substances, particularly those that temporarily relieve negative mood.

In animal studies, repeated stress exposure increases dopamine release in the nucleus accumbens and sensitizes the mesolimbic reward system, making drugs more reinforcing. Chronic stress also disturbs glutamatergic signaling in the prefrontal cortex, impairing inhibitory control and self-regulation, which increases susceptibility to compulsive drug seeking and reduces the ability to disregard drug-associated cues.

Stress is among the more reliable predictors of relapse. In human neuroimaging studies, stress-induced activation of the amygdala together with reduced prefrontal regulation is associated with self-reported craving and with subsequent return to use. People with a history of trauma, or of chronic social stress such as discrimination, poverty or housing insecurity, are at increased risk of substance use disorders.

Because stress interacts with reward circuitry and decision-making systems, many treatment approaches incorporate stress-reduction strategies, including cognitive behavioral therapy, mindfulness-based interventions and medications acting on stress-related neurochemistry.

=== Developmental stage ===
Adolescence is the period of greatest risk both for first use of an addictive drug and for the transition to disordered use. The prefrontal cortex, which supports planning, inhibitory control and the weighing of long-term consequences, develops more slowly than the brain's reward circuitry and is not fully mature until the mid-twenties. During this window sensitivity to reward is high while cognitive control is still developing, which contributes to greater risk-taking, including experimentation with drugs. Drug exposure in early adolescence can in turn disturb cortical development and delay prefrontal maturation, and prefrontal dysfunction in adolescents is itself associated with a higher risk of substance use disorder.

=== Comorbid disorders ===
People with comorbid mental health conditions such as depression, anxiety, attention deficit hyperactivity disorder or post-traumatic stress disorder are more likely to develop substance use disorders.

== Mechanisms ==
Addiction develops when repeated exposure to a rewarding stimulus produces lasting changes in the brain circuits that govern reward, stress and self-control. Current accounts describe this as a recurring three-stage cycle. During binge/intoxication, dopaminergic signaling in the basal ganglia gives the drug and the cues surrounding it a powerful pull on attention and behavior. During withdrawal/negative affect, brain stress systems in the extended amygdala become overactive and ordinary pleasures become muted, so that use is increasingly driven by relief rather than reward. During preoccupation/anticipation, reduced prefrontal cortex control over these systems leaves craving poorly restrained and makes relapse more likely. Each stage is associated with persistent changes in gene expression and synaptic plasticity within the affected circuits. In laboratory animals, repeated drug exposure causes a protein called ΔFosB to accumulate in reward-related neurons, which increases drug self-administration and blunts sensitivity to adverse consequences; it is used in preclinical research as a marker of addiction.

=== Reward circuitry ===
The reinforcing effects of most addictive drugs depend on dopamine signaling in the nucleus accumbens, the same pathway that responds to natural rewards such as food and sex. Altered dopamine neurotransmission is frequently observed following the development of an addictive state. In people and in animals that have developed an addiction, altered dopamine or opioid neurotransmission is evident in the nucleus accumbens and elsewhere in the striatum.

==== Cognitive and stimulus control ====
Cognitive control and stimulus control, which is associated with operant and classical conditioning, represent opposite processes (i.e., internal vs external or environmental, respectively) that compete over the control of an individual's elicited behaviors. Cognitive control, and particularly inhibitory control over behavior, is impaired in both addiction and attention deficit hyperactivity disorder. Stimulus-driven behavioral responses (i.e., stimulus control) that are associated with a particular rewarding stimulus tend to dominate one's behavior in an addiction.

In operant conditioning, behavior is influenced by outside stimuli, such as a drug. The operant conditioning theory of learning is useful in understanding why the mood-altering or stimulating consequences of drug use can reinforce continued use (an example of positive reinforcement) and why the addicted person seeks to avoid withdrawal through continued use (an example of negative reinforcement). Stimulus control is using the absence of the stimulus or the presence of a reward to influence the resulting behavior.

Cognitive control is the intentional selection of thoughts, behaviors and emotions in response to the environment. Drugs alter both the function and the structure of the brain. Cognitive functions such as learning, memory, and impulse control, are affected by drugs. These effects promote drug use, as well as hinder the ability to abstain from it. The increase in dopamine release is prominent in drug use, specifically in the ventral striatum and the nucleus accumbens. Dopamine release in this pathway is more closely tied to motivation — the "wanting" of a reward — than to the pleasure, or "liking", that the reward itself produces, which depends on separate brain systems. Addictive drugs cause a significant increase in this reward system, causing a large increase in dopamine signaling as well as increase in reward-seeking behavior, in turn motivating drug use. This promotes the development of a maladaptive drug to stimulus relationship. Early drug use leads to these maladaptive associations, later affecting cognitive processes used for coping, which are needed to abstain from them successfully.

==== Mesocorticolimbic pathway ====
Understanding the pathways in which drugs act and how drugs can alter those pathways is key when examining the biological basis of drug addiction. The reward pathway, known as the mesolimbic pathway, or its extension, the mesocorticolimbic pathway, is characterized by the interaction of several areas of the brain.

Dopaminergic neurons in the ventral tegmental area (VTA) fire in response to cues that predict a reward and project to the nucleus accumbens through the mesolimbic pathway; nearly all addictive drugs increase dopamine release along this pathway, although they act on it by different routes. The nucleus accumbens, made up largely of GABAergic medium spiny neurons, is a principal target of these projections and is involved in learning conditioned responses to drug-associated cues, and in the growing sensitivity to those cues as addiction progresses. A further target is the prefrontal cortex, including the anterior cingulate and orbitofrontal cortices, which weighs competing information in determining whether a behavior is carried out and forms the associations between drug reward and environmental cues that give those cues their power. These cues are strong mediators of drug-seeking behavior and can trigger relapse even after months or years of abstinence.

==== Role of dopamine and glutamate ====
Dopamine is the primary neurotransmitter of the brain's reward system, and also has roles in movement, emotion, cognition and motivation. Natural rewards such as eating, and recreational drug use, both trigger dopamine release, which underlies their reinforcing quality.

Excessive intake of many types of addictive drugs results in repeated release of high amounts of dopamine, which in turn affects the reward pathway directly through heightened dopamine receptor activation. Prolonged and abnormally high levels of dopamine in the synaptic cleft can induce receptor downregulation in the neural pathway. Downregulation of mesolimbic dopamine receptors can result in a decrease in the sensitivity to natural reinforcers.

Drug seeking is driven by glutamatergic projections from the prefrontal cortex to the nucleus accumbens, and chronic drug exposure produces lasting glutamate-mediated changes along this route.

=== Neuroadaptation and sensitization ===
Reward sensitization is a process that causes an increase in the amount of reward (specifically, incentive salience (Note: Incentive salience, the "motivational salience" for a reward, is a "desire" or "want" attribute, which includes a motivational component, that the brain assigns to a rewarding stimulus. As a consequence, incentive salience acts as a motivational "magnet" for a rewarding stimulus that commands attention, induces approach, and causes the rewarding stimulus to be sought out.)) that is assigned by the brain to a rewarding stimulus (e.g., a drug). In simple terms, when reward sensitization to a specific stimulus (e.g., a drug) occurs, an individual's "wanting" or desire for the stimulus itself and its associated cues increases. Reward sensitization normally occurs following chronically high levels of exposure to the stimulus.

On the incentive-sensitization account, "cue-induced wanting" or "cue-triggered wanting" – a form of craving triggered by drug-associated cues – drives much of the compulsive behavior seen in addiction.

During the development of an addiction, the repeated association of otherwise neutral and even non-rewarding stimuli with drug consumption triggers an associative learning process that causes these previously neutral stimuli to act as conditioned positive reinforcers of addictive drug use (i.e., these stimuli start to function as drug cues). As conditioned positive reinforcers of drug use, these previously neutral stimuli are assigned incentive salience (which manifests as a craving) – sometimes at pathologically high levels due to reward sensitization – which can transfer to the primary reinforcer (e.g., the use of an addictive drug) with which it was originally paired. Incentive sensitization is one of several competing accounts of addiction. A 2025 review by the theory's originators sets it against opponent-process theories, habit theories, and theories centered on impaired prefrontal control, and addresses continuing debate over whether craving is central to addiction and whether addictive behavior is accurately described as compulsive.

In contrast to ΔFosB's reward-sensitizing effect, CREB transcriptional activity decreases user's sensitivity to the rewarding effects of the substance. CREB transcription in the nucleus accumbens is implicated in psychological dependence and symptoms involving a lack of pleasure or motivation during drug withdrawal.

=== Molecular and epigenetic mechanisms ===
Repeated drug exposure changes how genes are switched on and off in the brain's reward circuits without altering the underlying DNA sequence, a set of processes known as epigenetic regulation. Three kinds of change have been implicated: chemical modification of the histone proteins around which DNA is wound, methylation of the DNA itself, and altered levels of small regulatory molecules called microRNAs.

In rodents, some drug-induced epigenetic marks can be passed from parent to offspring and alter the offspring's response to the same drug, in some experiments reducing rather than increasing their drug taking. Neither the inheritance of these marks in humans nor their behavioral effects has been established.

== Theories and models ==
The brain disease model of addiction posits that an individual's exposure to an addictive drug is the most significant environmental risk factor for addiction. In a review in The New England Journal of Medicine, Marc Lewis argued that the brain disease model gives a misleading and incomplete account, and that the brain changes it describes are better understood as a form of learning. Lewis was among a group of researchers who launched the Addiction Theory Network in 2018 to challenge the model and argue that addiction is better explained by choice, learning and social context.

=== Psychological theories ===
The psychoanalytic theory model defines addiction as a form of defense against feelings of hopelessness and helplessness as well as a symptom of failure to regulate powerful emotions related to adverse childhood experiences (ACEs), various forms of maltreatment and dysfunction experienced in childhood. In this case, the addictive substance provides brief but total relief and positive feelings of control.

Psychological contributions include learning and conditioning processes, impulsivity, reward sensitivity, and the use of substances to cope with negative mood or trauma. Conditioning models hold that environmental cues can acquire motivational significance of their own and trigger craving and relapse even after long periods of abstinence. Reviews of alcohol use disorder identify overvaluation of the drug's reinforcing effects, elevated impulsivity across several dimensions, the acute effects of stress and environmental triggers, and a lack of alternative rewarding activities as well-established psychological determinants, and present these processes as interacting with biological and social vulnerabilities, each reinforcing the others.

==== Personality theories ====
Personality theories of addiction are psychological models that associate personality traits or modes of thinking (i.e., affective states) with an individual's proclivity for developing an addiction. Data analysis demonstrates that psychological profiles of drug users and non-users have significant differences, and the psychological predisposition to using different drugs may be different. Models of addiction risk that have been proposed in psychology literature include: an affect dysregulation model of positive and negative psychological affects, the reinforcement sensitivity theory of impulsiveness and behavioral inhibition, and an impulsivity model of reward sensitization and impulsiveness.

==== Social learning theory ====
Social learning theory, as originally proposed by Albert Bandura, holds that behavior is shaped by the reciprocal relationships between personal factors, the external environment, and the behavior itself (a principle known as reciprocal determinism). Applied to addiction, this frames drug use as arising from the interaction between an individual's personal characteristics, their social environment, and drug-related behavior itself, and characterizes addiction as a chronically evolving biopsychosocial disorder. On this account, effective treatment should target every node of the model and the relationships between them, rather than any single factor in isolation.

=== Social control theory ===
According to Travis Hirschi's social control theory, adolescents with stronger attachments to family, religious, academic, and other social institutions are less likely to engage in delinquent and maladaptive behavior, such as drug use leading to addiction.

=== Evolutionary perspectives ===
Some scholars have proposed evolutionary explanations for addiction, suggesting that vulnerabilities to substance or behavioral dependence reflect by-products or dysregulated expressions of reward and learning systems that were adaptive in ancestral environments. A 2024 review characterizes most such accounts as versions of evolutionary mismatch, in which substances and activities that are evolutionarily novel in their purity, potency or availability act on reward systems shaped under very different conditions, and extends the argument from substances to behavioral addictions. Within that framework, Nesse and Berridge argued that purified drugs and direct routes of administration bypass the systems that ordinarily evaluate experience, giving a "false signal of a fitness benefit" that hijacks the brain mechanisms underlying wanting and liking. Other reviews emphasize how psychoactive substances and behavioral reinforcers act on conserved mechanisms for reward, reinforcement, and emotion, which in modern settings can be overstimulated or maladapted. These perspectives do not replace proximate neurobiological models, but aim instead to situate contemporary patterns of vulnerability within a broader evolutionary framework.

== Diagnosis ==
Addiction is diagnosed clinically against criteria set out in the two major classification systems, supported by brief screening instruments.

=== DSM-5 ===
The fifth edition of the DSM uses the term substance use disorder to refer to a spectrum of drug use-related disorders. The DSM‑5 eliminates the terms abuse and dependence from diagnostic categories, instead using the specifiers of mild, moderate, and severe to indicate the extent of disordered use. The number of diagnostic criteria present in a given case determines these specifiers. In the DSM‑5, the term drug addiction is synonymous with severe substance use disorder.

The DSM‑5 introduced a new diagnostic category for behavioral addictions. Problem gambling is the only condition included in this category in the fifth edition. Internet gaming disorder is listed as a "condition requiring further study" in the DSM‑5.

Past editions have used physical dependence and the associated withdrawal syndrome to identify an addictive state. Physical dependence occurs when the body has adjusted by incorporating the substance into its "normal" functioning – i.e., attains homeostasis – and therefore physical withdrawal symptoms occur on cessation of use. Tolerance is the process of the body adapting to a substance so that larger amounts are needed for the same effect. Withdrawal describes the physical and psychological symptoms that appear when a substance the body has adapted to is reduced or stopped. Which symptoms occur, and how dangerous they are, depends heavily on the substance: withdrawal from alcohol or benzodiazepines can be life-threatening, whereas withdrawal from most other substances is distressing but not usually dangerous.

Medical researchers who actively study addiction have criticized the DSM classification of addiction for being flawed and involving arbitrary diagnostic criteria.

=== ICD-11 ===
The eleventh revision of the International Classification of Diseases, commonly referred to as ICD-11, conceptualizes diagnosis somewhat differently. ICD-11 first distinguishes between problems with psychoactive substance use ("Disorders due to substance use") and behavioral addictions ("Disorders due to addictive behaviours"). With regard to psychoactive substances, ICD-11 explains that the included substances initially produce "pleasant or appealing psychoactive effects that are rewarding and reinforcing with repeated use, [but] with continued use, many of the included substances have the capacity to produce dependence. They have the potential to cause numerous forms of harm, both to mental and physical health." Instead of the DSM-5 approach of one diagnosis ("Substance Use Disorder") covering all types of problematic substance use, ICD-11 offers three diagnostic possibilities: 1) Episode of Harmful Psychoactive Substance Use, 2) Harmful Pattern of Psychoactive Substance Use, and 3) Substance Dependence.

=== Screening and assessment ===
Screening instruments are used to identify people who may have a substance use problem and to gauge its severity, usually before a full diagnostic assessment. The World Health Organization's ASSIST covers lifetime and recent use, craving, and use-related problems across substance classes; the TAPS tool combines screening and assessment in one instrument; and the CRAFFT is designed for adolescents and includes items on substance-related driving risk. The DAST is a self-report measure of problematic drug use. Distinct from these, the Addictions Neuroclinical Assessment is a research framework that profiles people across three domains (executive function, incentive salience and negative emotionality) rather than a clinical screening questionnaire.

== Prevention ==
Because many risk factors for addiction are social and modifiable, prevention strategies that target them can improve outcomes; when delivered during childhood and adolescence, such strategies reduce the risk of later substance use disorder. Prevention is usually organized in three tiers: universal programs aimed at a whole population, selective programs aimed at groups at raised risk, and indicated programs aimed at individuals already showing early signs of problem use. Interventions with the strongest evidence include family skills programs, personal and social skills education delivered in schools, and policies that limit availability and raise the price of alcohol and tobacco. Programs based on information provision alone, or on fear-based messaging, have not been found effective and may be counterproductive.

== Management ==
The most effective treatment combines medication (where an effective one is available) with psychological and social support, emphasizing long-term management and relapse prevention. The remission rates for substance use disorders vary.

=== Pharmacological ===
The medications available differ between substances. For opioid use disorder, opioid agonist maintenance treatment with methadone or buprenorphine is common. It retains people in treatment and suppresses illicit opioid use more effectively than placebo. A systematic review and meta-analysis of 15 trials and 36 cohort studies found that time spent receiving opioid agonist treatment was associated with lower all-cause and overdose mortality, with the risk of death around six times higher in the four weeks after treatment stopped. A Cochrane review also found that opioid substitution therapy reduces the risk of acquiring hepatitis C among people who inject drugs, with a larger reduction when combined with high-coverage needle and syringe programmes.

For alcohol use disorder, oral naltrexone and acamprosate are recommended as first-line medications alongside psychosocial support, whereas trial evidence that disulfiram reduces drinking is weaker. For tobacco (nicotine) dependence, varenicline, cytisine and nicotine e-cigarettes are among the most effective aids for quitting long-term, followed closely by using two forms of nicotine replacement therapy at once (for example a patch together with gum or a lozenge). Bupropion is also used. No medication has been approved for cocaine or amphetamine (stimulant) use disorder, for which psychosocial treatment remains the principal care.

=== Psychological and behavioral ===
Psychological and behavioral therapies are used across all forms of addiction, both alone and together with medication; commonly used approaches include CBT, motivational interviewing, contingency management (which provides tangible rewards for verified abstinence), and twelve-step facilitation. For stimulant use disorder, contingency management (particularly when combined with a community reinforcement approach) has the strongest supporting evidence among psychosocial treatments. For alcohol use disorder, structured twelve-step facilitation programs that encourage participation in Alcoholics Anonymous are at least as effective as other established therapies such as CBT for sustaining abstinence and may lower health-care costs.

The creative arts therapies, including art therapy, music therapy, drama and dance, are sometimes offered alongside conventional treatment, and artwork produced during treatment has been used informally to aid assessment and track progress. A 2018 systematic review found insufficient evidence that visual art, drama, or dance and movement therapies reduce substance misuse, though music therapy showed some promise in preparing people to engage with treatment. Proposed benefits include providing a non-verbal outlet for difficult emotions and strengthening engagement in treatment.

==== Transtheoretical model (stages of change model) ====
The transtheoretical model describes behavior change as a stepwise progression through a series of stages (precontemplation, contemplation, preparation, action and maintenance) through which people commonly move back and forth rather than in a single linear sequence, with relapse treated as an expected part of the process rather than a failure. In addiction treatment the model is used to gauge a person's readiness to change and to time intervention accordingly, since beginning too early may make a person defensive and resistant to change.

=== Harm reduction ===
Harm reduction covers measures that reduce the damage associated with continued substance use. Approaches include needle and syringe programs, naloxone distribution to reverse opioid overdose, drug checking, and supervised consumption facilities. Opioid agonist maintenance treatment also functions as harm reduction: independently of whether use stops, it is associated with reduced mortality and with a lower risk of acquiring hepatitis C. A 2023 systematic review of global coverage reported that provision of these services remains limited, with only nine countries implementing all five.

== Prognosis ==
Addiction is generally understood as a chronic, relapsing condition rather than one resolved in a single episode of care, and long-term outcomes vary widely. A systematic review and meta-analysis of long-term follow-up studies estimated that between 35% and 54% of people with a substance use disorder achieved remission (defined as no longer meeting diagnostic criteria for at least six months) but that this typically occurred only after a mean follow-up of around 17 years, with roughly 7–9% of cases remitting in any given year. Its authors concluded that for a substantial proportion of people the condition behaves more like a long-term than an acute disorder, and argued for treatment models designed around chronicity. Substance use disorders are treatable: there is evidence of clinically significant benefit for medications in opioid, nicotine and alcohol use disorders, for behavioral therapies across all substance use disorders, and for neuromodulation in nicotine use disorder.

== Epidemiology ==
An analysis of Global Burden of Disease Study data estimated that about 163 million people worldwide were living with a substance use disorder in 2021, comprising roughly 111 million cases of alcohol use disorder and about 53 million of drug use disorders. Although these totals rose as the world population grew, the age-standardized prevalence rate fell by about 17% between 1990 and 2021. Prevalence peaks in young adults, at roughly 25 to 29 years, and is consistently higher among males. Age-standardized prevalence was highest in high-income North America and lowest in western sub-Saharan Africa and in north Africa and the Middle East; rates fell in most regions, but drug use disorders rose in several high-income settings.

Measured as a risk factor rather than as a disorder, alcohol use was responsible for an estimated 2.6 million deaths worldwide in 2019, or 4.7% of all deaths, and psychoactive drug use for a further 0.6 million; about 2 million of the alcohol-attributable and 0.4 million of the drug-attributable deaths were among men.

Alcohol-attributable burden was heaviest in countries with a low Socio-demographic Index, whereas drug-attributable burden increased with higher socio-demographic development. Between 2010 and 2023, drug use was one of only three risk factors worldwide whose age-standardized attributable DALY rate rose.

=== Regional variation ===
Patterns differ markedly by region. In Europe, early initiation of drinking has declined in most countries, although as of 2014 an average of 28% of young people had first used alcohol before the age of 13. Alcohol dependence is less prevalent across much of Asia than in Western countries, reflecting both socioeconomic and biological differences in drinking behavior. In Latin America, heroin consumption is low in most countries despite regional opium production, with the highest incidence in Mexico.

== History ==
Habitual drunkenness was described as a medical condition well before the modern concept of addiction existed. The American physician Benjamin Rush and the British naval physician Thomas Trotter, writing independently in the late eighteenth century, are conventionally credited with consolidating the idea that compulsive drinking was a disease rather than a vice — an idea that gained wide currency only through the nineteenth century, alongside the temperance movement.

Comparable claims were made for drugs somewhat later. In 1877 the Berlin physician Eduard Levinstein published Die Morphiumsucht, the first monograph to treat morphine addiction as a disorder in its own right; an English translation, Morbid Craving for Morphia, appeared the following year. Levinstein defined the condition as an uncontrollable desire to use the drug, but argued that it was not a mental illness, on the grounds that the impairment of will did not extend beyond drug use into other areas of life.

=== Terminology ===
The word addiction derives from the Latin "addico", meaning "giving over" with both positive connotations (devotion, dedication) and negative ones (being enslaved to a creditor in Roman law). This dual meaning persisted in traditional English dictionaries, encompassing both legal surrender and personal devotion to habits. Later, the 19th century temperance movements narrowed the definition of addiction to just drug-related disease, ignoring behavioral addictions and the possibility of positive or neutral addictions. This restrictive view opposes the current understanding of addiction.

Addiction and addictive behavior are polysemes denoting a category of mental disorders, of neuropsychological symptoms, or of merely maladaptive/harmful habits and lifestyles. A common use of the term addiction in medicine is for neuropsychological symptoms denoting pervasive/excessive and intense urges to engage in a category of behavioral compulsions or impulses towards sensory rewards (e.g., alcohol, betel quid, drugs, sex, gambling, video gaming). Addictive disorders or addiction disorders are mental disorders involving high intensities of addictions (as neuropsychological symptoms) that induce functional disabilities (i.e., limit subjects' social/family and occupational activities); the two categories of such disorders are substance-use addictions and behavioral addictions.

The etymology of the term addiction throughout history has been misunderstood and has taken on various meanings associated with the word. An example is the usage of the word in the religious landscape of early modern Europe. "Addiction" at the time meant "to attach" to something, giving it both positive and negative connotations. The object of this attachment could be characterized as "good or bad". The meaning of addiction during the early modern period was mostly associated with positivity and goodness; during this early modern and highly religious era of Christian revivalism and Pietistic tendencies, it was seen as a way of "devoting oneself to another".

==== The suffixes "-holic" and "-holism" ====
In contemporary English, "-holic" is a suffix that can be added to a subject to denote an addiction to it. It was extracted from the word alcoholism (one of the first addictions to be widely identified both medically and socially) (correctly the root "alcohol" plus the suffix "-ism") by misdividing or rebracketing it into "alco" and "-holism". Terms formed this way, such as chocoholic and workaholic, are colloquial rather than diagnostic; the only behavioral addictions recognized in current diagnostic manuals are gambling disorder and gaming disorder.

== Society and culture ==
Addiction carries substantial social and economic consequences, is among the more heavily stigmatized health conditions, and has been interpreted through political and anthropological frameworks as well as medical ones.

=== Stigma and public perception ===
Substance use disorders are among the more heavily stigmatized health conditions, and negative attitudes are documented among clinicians as well as among the general public. A systematic review of studies of health professionals in Western countries found that negative attitudes towards patients with substance use disorders were common, and that they were associated with poorer communication, less involvement of patients in decisions about their own care, and reduced engagement with treatment. A later systematic review of studies conducted in the United States reported similar findings among practising clinicians and trainees, and found that some educational and contact-based interventions reduced measured stigma; the authors cautioned that the studies were few, varied widely in method, and that none linked measured stigma to patient health outcomes.

The arts are used in advocacy and public education about addiction. Artists (particularly those with lived experience of addiction and recovery) use their work to reduce stigma and to reframe addiction as a treatable health condition rather than a moral failing, an approach intended to promote public compassion and shift responses from the criminal-justice system toward the public-health system.

=== Economic and social cost ===
Addiction imposes substantial financial and human costs on individuals and on society. These costs arise from the direct adverse effects of drugs and associated healthcare costs (e.g., emergency medical services and outpatient and inpatient care), long-term complications (e.g., lung cancer from smoking tobacco products, liver cirrhosis and dementia from chronic alcohol consumption, and meth mouth from methamphetamine use), the loss of productivity and associated welfare costs, fatal and non-fatal accidents (e.g., traffic collisions), suicides, homicides, and incarceration, among others.

In the United States, an estimated 69,973 people died of drug overdose in 2025, down almost 14% from 81,313 in 2024 and the third consecutive annual decline following the peak reached during the opioid epidemic. Access to treatment is limited worldwide: among countries reporting data to the World Health Organization, the proportion of people with a substance use disorder in contact with treatment services ranged from under 1% to no more than 35%.

=== Structural and political accounts ===
From the early 1980s, critical medical anthropology was applied to drug use, shifting attention from cultural meaning to the political and economic structures within which drug use occurs: political systems, economic inequality, and institutional power over social processes. The approach emphasises three themes — self-medication of the distress produced by social inequality and injustice; the social production of suffering, meaning the ill health and hardship concentrated among those with least power; and the political economy of licit and illicit drug markets. On this view, heavy drug use and addiction are consequences of these larger-scale inequalities in power.

=== Cultural and anthropological accounts ===
Anthropologists have approached addiction largely through ethnographic fieldwork, producing two influential models.

==== Cultural model ====
Drawing on fieldwork with the Camba of Bolivia in the 1950s, Dwight Heath described a community in which adults drank heavily and became intoxicated at communal festivals, yet held no concept of alcoholism and showed no evident social problems attributed to drinking. Heath argued from this that the problems associated with heavy drinking are culturally determined and therefore vary between societies, challenging the assumption that sustained heavy use is inevitably addictive and harmful. The model drew criticism from the sociologist Robin Room and others, who held that anthropologists working in this tradition tended to understate the severity of alcohol problems; Merrill Singer has observed that these ethnographers belonged to a generation socialised to regard heavy drinking as normal.

==== Subcultural model ====
Historically, addiction has been viewed from the etic perspective, defining users through the pathology of their condition. As reports of drug use rapidly increased, the cultural model found application in anthropological research exploring western drug subculture practices.

The approach evolved from the ethnographic exploration into the lived experiences and subjectivities of 1960s and 70s drug subcultures. The publication "Taking care of business", by Edward Preble and John J. Casey, documented the daily lives of New York street-based intravenous heroin users in detail, providing insight into the dynamic social worlds and activities that surrounded their drug use. Singer writes that this work reframed substance use as a social phenomenon rather than a matter of immorality or deviance. The prevailing culture can influence drug-taking behaviors, along with the physical and psychological effects of the drug. To marginalized individuals, drug subcultures can provide social connection, symbolic meaning, and socially constructed purpose that they may feel is unattainable through conventional means. On this account, a biosocial approach is required for a holistic understanding of addiction.

== Research directions ==
Vaccines intended to reduce the effects of addictive drugs have been investigated since the early 2000s. The approach conjugates the drug molecule to a carrier protein so that the immune system produces antibodies that bind the drug in the bloodstream, reducing the amount that reaches the brain. Candidates have been tested against nicotine, cocaine, opioids and fentanyl.

No such vaccine is licensed for use in any country. A Cochrane review found no evidence that nicotine vaccines improve long-term smoking cessation, and two phase III trials of NicVAX reported quit rates of approximately 11% in both the vaccine and the placebo groups. Anti-cocaine vaccine development has likewise not produced an approved product, and as of 2023 no pharmacological treatment for cocaine dependence had been approved.

GLP-1 receptor agonist medications such as semaglutide, developed for type 2 diabetes and obesity, have attracted interest as possible treatments for substance use disorders because they act on the brain's reward system and reduce reward-driven behavior. Large observational studies have associated their use with lower rates of alcohol- and opioid-related harm; however, the small number of completed randomized controlled trials has not yet confirmed a consistent benefit, and as of 2023 specialists described these medications as promising but unproven for this indication.

== See also ==
- Binge drinking
- Cognitive liberty
- Darwinian hedonism
- Dopaminergic pathways
- Substance dependence
