= Anne Lingford-Hughes =

British psychiatrist

- Education: University of Oxford; University of Cambridge
- Scientific career
- Workplaces: Imperial College London; Maudsley Hospital; Bethlem Royal Hospital

Anne Lingford-Hughes is a British psychiatrist who is Professor of Addiction Biology at Imperial College London. She works on addictions at the Central and North West London NHS Foundation Trust. Her research uses neuroimaging and pharmacology to understand the neurobiology of addiction.

== Early life and education ==
Lingford-Hughes grew up in Shrewsbury. She attended Shrewsbury High School, where she was not encouraged to study medicine. She became the first woman at Shrewsbury School, and ~~applied~~went on to study medicine at St Hugh's College~~. She eventually studied medicine at the University of Oxford~~, where she was awarded the Lavinia Smith-Rippon Exhibition. During her time at medical school at the University of Oxford, she became more interested in learning how people work. Her third year supervisor moved to Cambridge, and asked if she wanted to do a doctorate. She took an interruption of studies, moved to Cambridge and started working on cholecystokinin receptors.

Lingford-Hughes obtained a PhD from University of Cambridge. When she was training to become a psychiatrist, she was encouraged to study the Γ-Aminobutyric acid (GABA) in schizophrenia. She instead decided to study GABA in alcoholism with Jane Marshall. Lingford-Hughes trained in psychiatry at the Maudsley Hospital and the Bethlem Royal Hospital.

== Research and career ==
After a chance meeting with David Nutt, Lingford-Hughes switched her focus to addiction. Her research explores addiction using neuroimaging and neuropharmacological analysis. Lingford-Hughes pioneered the use of positron emission tomography (PET) to characterise dopamine, GABA benzodiazepins and NK1 receptors in alcoholism and opiate dependence. She was elected Secretary of the British Association For Psychopharmacology, where she wrote guidelines on the management of substance misuse.

Lingford-Hughes has studied neural responses to detoxification of methodone, and the impact of baclofen on people with alcoholism. Throughout her career, Lingford-Hughes has advocated for women scientists. In 2015, she was awarded the Academic Women in Psychiatry Award.

She was elected a Fellow of the Academy of Medical Sciences in 2026.

== Selected publications ==
- Theresa Moore; Stanley Zammit; Anne Lingford-Hughes; Thomas R E Barnes; Peter B. Jones; Margaret Burke; Glyn Lewis (1 July 2007). "Cannabis use and risk of psychotic or affective mental health outcomes: a systematic review". The Lancet. 370 (9584): 319–328. doi:10.1016/s0140-6736(07)61162-3. ISSN 0140-6736. PMID 17662880. Wikidata Q28238516.
- Stanley Zammit; Theresa H M Moore; Anne Lingford-Hughes; Thomas R E Barnes; Peter B Jones; Margaret Burke; Glyn Lewis (1 November 2008). "Effects of cannabis use on outcomes of psychotic disorders: systematic review". British Journal of Psychiatry. 193 (5): 357–363. doi:10.1192/bjp.bp.107.046375. ISSN 0007-1250. PMID 18978312. Wikidata Q34870543.
- James Z Daniel; Matthew Hickman; John Macleod; et al. (1 March 2009). "Is socioeconomic status in early life associated with drug use? A systematic review of the evidence". Drug and Alcohol Review. 28 (2): 142–153. doi:10.1111/j.1465-3362.2008.00042.x. ISSN 0959-5236. PMID 19320699. Wikidata Q30859999.
