= Oh Baby =

Oh Baby, O Baby, Ooh Baby, Ooh Baby Baby, or Ooh Ooh Baby may refer to:

== Film and television ==
- Oh, Baby! (1926 film), an American silent comedy film
- Oh! Baby (2019 film), an Indian fantasy comedy film
- Oh, Baby! (2020 film), an American short film by Kate Morgan Chadwick
- Oh Baby (TV series), an American comedy series that aired on Lifetime (1998–2000)
- "Ooh Baby Baby", an episode from the American TV series Bear in the Big Blue House

== Music ==
=== Albums ===
- Oh Baby! (Big John Patton album), 1965
- Oh, Baby! (Bill Cosby album), 1991
- Oh Baby, a 1996 album by Rick Fay
- Oh Baby, a 2002 album by Mike Melvoin

=== Songs ===
==== O Baby ====
- "O Baby", a 1995 single by Siouxsie and the Banshees
- "O Baby" (Robyn song), from the 2003 album Don't Stop the Music
- "O Baby (I Do Believe I'm Losing You)", a 1968 single by Billy Hawks
- "O Baby", a track by Anu Malik on the soundtrack for the 1999 Indian film Baadshah
- "O Baby", a track on the soundtrack for the 2016 film Ricky

==== Oh Baby ====
- "Oh Baby" (Walter Donaldson song), 1923, recorded by The Wolverine Orchestra and others
- "Oh, Baby!", a 1928 song by Owen Murphy
- "Oh Baby", a 1956 song by Cathy Carr
- "Oh Baby", a 1958 song by Esquerita
- "Oh Baby", a 1958 song by The Jesters
- "Oh Baby", a 1960 song by Larry Williams
- "Oh Baby" (Little Walter song), 1954, covered by Led Zeppelin and Kim Wilson
- "Oh Baby", a 1984 song by Münchener Freiheit (band)
- "Oh Baby", a song by LCD Soundsystem from the 2017 album American Dream
- "Oh Baby", a song by Cinta Laura from the 2010 album Cinta Laura
- "Oh Baby", a song by Status Quo from the 1973 album Piledriver
- "Oh Baby", a song by Suzi Quatro from the 1982 album Main Attraction
- "Oh Baby", a 2010 song by Robbie Rivera with Dero and Juan Magán
- "Oh Baby", a 2002 single by Yorkshire singer Rhianna
- "Oh Baby" (Twenty 4 Seven song), 1994
- "Oh Baby", a song by Korean group Sistar from the 2011 album So Cool
- "Oh Baby", a 2023 song by Nathan Dawe and Bru-C featuring Bshp and Issey Cross
- "Oh Baby", a 2021 song by Abhi the Nomad from Abhi vs the Universe

==== Ooh Baby ====
- "Ooh Baby", a song by R&B singer Ciara from the 2004 album Goodies
- "Ooh Baby" (Mario song), 2010
- "Ooh Baby (You Know That I Love You)," a 1975 song by George Harrison
- "Ooh Baby", a 1966 song by Bo Diddley, included in the 1997 collection His Best
- "Ooh Baby", a 1962 song by Chuck Jackson
- "Ooh Baby", a 1967 song by Deon Jackson, Harold Thomas, Richard Barbary
- "Ooh Baby", a 1975 song by Gary Lewis & the Playboys
- "Ooh Baby", a 1973 song by Gilbert O'Sullivan, covered by Frank Schöbel
- "Ooh Baby", a 1965 song by Howlin' Wolf

=== Ooh Baby Baby ===
- "Ooo Baby Baby", a 1965 single by The Miracles written Pete Moore and Smokey Robinson, and covered as "Ooh Baby Baby" by Linda Ronstadt and others
- "Ooh Baby Baby", a song by Lil Rob on the 2005 album Twelve Eighteen, Pt. 1

==== Ooh Ooh Baby ====
- "Ooh, Ooh Baby" (Taral Hicks song), a 1996 single by R&B singer Taral Hicks featuring Missy Elliott
- "Ooh Ooh Baby", a song by Britney Spears from the 2007 album Blackout

== Other uses ==
- Oh Baby, a brand line of Destination Maternity

== See also ==
- "Baby-Baby-Baby", a single by TLC from the 1992 album Ooooooohhh... On the TLC Tip
- "Oh Baby Don't You Weep", a 1964 song by James Brown
- "Oh Baby I...", a 1994 single by British band Eternal
