= Glyn Lewis =

British psychiatric epidemiologist

Glyn Lewis is a British professor of psychiatric epidemiology and the current head of the Division of Psychiatry at University College London

== Education ==
Glyn Lewis was born in Wales. He studied at University College, Oxford, where he played saxophone with The Oxcentrics, a Dixieland jazz band. Lewis trained as a psychiatrist at the Maudsley Hospital in London and as an epidemiologist at the London School of Hygiene and Tropical Medicine. He received his PhD from the Institute of Psychiatry at King's College London.

== Research ==
Lewis worked at the University of Bristol and the Cardiff University prior to his current post at UCL. He has published extensively on psychiatric epidemiology, including investigating the causes of psychiatric disorders. His research is in the area of the aetiology of schizophrenia and depression and the treatment of depression and other mental disorders. He has published widely in leading journals such as The Lancet, including research on the risk of psychosis due to the use of cannabis and the mental health of Afghan and Iraq veterans. He has conducted several randomized controlled trials, including the PREVENT study, a trial comparing antidepressants with mindfulness-based cognitive therapy, ANTLER Antidepressants to prevent relapse in depression, and PANDA, a trial investigating the effectiveness of antidepressants in mild depression.

== Select publications ==
- Naomi R. Wray; Stephan Ripke; Manuel Mattheisen; et al. (26 April 2018). "Genome-wide association analyses identify 44 risk variants and refine the genetic architecture of major depression". Nature Genetics. doi:10.1038/S41588-018-0090-3. ISSN 1061-4036. PMC 5934326. PMID 29700475. Wikidata Q52560096.
- Glyn Lewis; Anthony J. Pelosi; Ricardo Araya; Graham Dunn (1 May 1992). "Measuring psychiatric disorder in the community: a standardized assessment for use by lay interviewers". Psychological Medicine. 22 (2): 465–486. doi:10.1017/S0033291700030415. ISSN 0033-2917. PMID 1615114. Wikidata Q44519084.
- Major Depressive Disorder Working Group of the Psychiatric GWAS Consortium; Stephan Ripke; Naomi R Wray; et al. (3 April 2012). "A mega-analysis of genome-wide association studies for major depressive disorder". Molecular Psychiatry. 18 (4): 497–511. doi:10.1038/MP.2012.21. ISSN 1359-4184. PMC 3837431. PMID 22472876. Wikidata Q29417093.
