= Weindling =

Weindling is a surname. Notable people with the surname include:

- Oliver Weindling (born 1955), British jazz promoter
- Paul Weindling (born 1953), professor in the history of medicine
