= Simon Wallace =

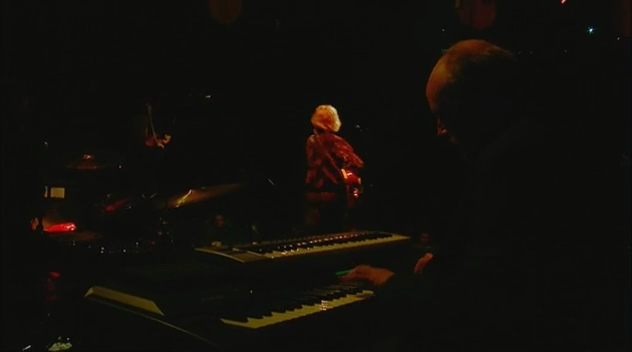
- Wallace with The Waterboys in 2010
- Born: 1957 (age 68–69); Newport, Wales
- Education: Royal Welsh College of Music & Drama; University College, Oxford
- Occupations: Composer; pianist
- Spouse: Sarah Moule
- Musical career
- Genres: Jazz; classical
- Instrument: Piano
- Formerly of: The Oxcentrics; The Lindsay Kemp Company; The Waterboys
- Website: www.simonwallace.org

Simon Wallace (born 1957) is a British composer and pianist.

Simon Wallace was born in Newport, South Wales. He studied music at the Royal Welsh College of Music & Drama and University College, Oxford, where he ran the Oxford University Jazz Club and played with The Oxcentrics, a Dixieland jazz band. He also studied with jazz pianists in London and New York.

Wallace collaborated with the film and television composer Simon Brint from 1980 until Brint's death in 2011. They composed music for television series including Absolutely Fabulous, Coupling, French and Saunders, Murder Most Horrid, Tracey Ullman Takes on New York, All Rise For Julian Clary, The Ruby Wax Show, Bosom Pals, The All New Alexie Sayle Show, The Clive James Show and The Ben Elton Show. In 1982 they scored A Shocking Accident which won 1983 Oscar for 'best live action short their last broadcast work together was the music for The One Ronnie in December 2010. Independently of Brint he scored the 1982 David Leland television drama R.H.I.N.O., the 1998 series Duck Patrol, and the documentary series Famous Authors. He worked on two series of The Armstrong and Miller Show (2007-2009 BBC1) arranging and playing music for the Brabbins and Fyffe sketches.

In 1986, the Bangkok Symphony Orchestra commissioned a five movement symphony for Bhumibol Adulyadej, the King of Thailand's 60th birthday. A further commission Fanfare and Rhapsody was performed in 2006 as part of the celebrations for His Majesty the King's 60th Jubilee.

From 1990 to 1993, Wallace toured internationally as a member of The Lindsay Kemp Company devising and performing music with composer percussionist Joji Hirota for the show Onnagata and the film Travelling Light. In 1993, he was musical director for the West End production and cast recording album of Elegies for Angels, Punks and Raging Queens.

In 1994, he met the American lyricist Fran Landesman. with whom he collaborated until her death in 2011 writing some 300 songs. Theatre shows based on Landesman/Wallace songs include There's Something Irresistible in Down (1996) produced at the Young Vic by members of the Royal Shakespeare Company, Forbidden Games (1997) at the Ustinov Theatre Bath, the Pleasance Theatre Edinburgh and the Gdansk Shakespeare Festival and Queen of the Bohemian Dream (2007) produced at the Source Theatre in Washington, D.C.

From 2003 to 2006, Wallace was musical director for jazz singer Clare Teal. He arranged and directed her 2004 album Don't Talk (SonyBMG) and wrote arrangements for her broadcasts with the BBC Big Band, the BBC Concert Orchestra and for television appearances including two on the Michael Parkinson Show.

Between 2009 and 2011, he toured in the UK and US with singer Barb Jungr and in 2010 worked with The Waterboys on the premiere of "An Appointment With Mr Yeats" at the Abbey Theatre, Dublin, Ireland. He arranged and co-produced Jungr's 2010 album The Men I Love (Naim Records) and has produced albums by singers Ian Shaw (Jazzhouse), Sarah Moule (Linn Records), Nicki Leighton-Thomas (Candid Records), Pete Atkin (Hillside Music) and Gill Manly (Linn Records)

In 2020, during the COVID-19 pandemic, Wallace produced a distributed lockdown version of the 1925 song Don't Bring Lulu played by the Oxcentrics.

Simon Wallace is married to jazz singer Sarah Moule, lives in southeast London, and has a son born in 2000.
