= Mike Southon =

Mike Southon may refer to:

- Mike Southon (writer), British entrepreneur and author
- Mike Southon (cinematographer), British cinematographer
