= Ripke =

Ripke is a surname. Notable people with the surname include:

- Axel Ripke (1880–1937), German journalist and politician
- Paul Ripke (born 1981), German fashion and sports photographer
- Stephan Ripke (born 1973), German statistical geneticist
