= Foundation for Alcohol Research and Education =

Australian not-for-profit organisation aiming to minimise harms from alcohol

The Foundation for Alcohol Research and Education (FARE), formerly the Alcohol Education & Rehabilitation Foundation (AERF), is an independent, not-for-profit, Australian health organisation based in Canberra.

Established on 17 October 2001 by the Australian Parliament under the Alcohol Education and Rehabilitation Account Act 2001 with a A$115 million grant, the Alcohol Education & Rehabilitation Foundation was set up to distribute funding for programs and research with the goal of preventing harms caused by alcohol and licit substance misuse, and to change the way that Australians drink alcohol.

The organisation is a company limited by guarantee under the Corporations Act 2001, and gained Health Promotion Charity status in July 2005. It changed its name on 12 September 2011 to Foundation for Alcohol Research and Education. According to the Australian Charities and Not-for-profits Commission website, FARE was registered as a charity on 3 December 2012.

It strives to build an up-to-date information database about alcohol and the complex problems it causes, communicate research to the public. It collaborates with other parties to help stop harms caused by alcohol, and develops and advocates for effective policies and programs, and undertakes to "defend the public interest and hold the alcohol industry to account".

== See also ==
- Alcohol and Drug Foundation
- Drug and Alcohol Review, an academic journal
