= Charles Kuta =

American electronics engineer and software engineer

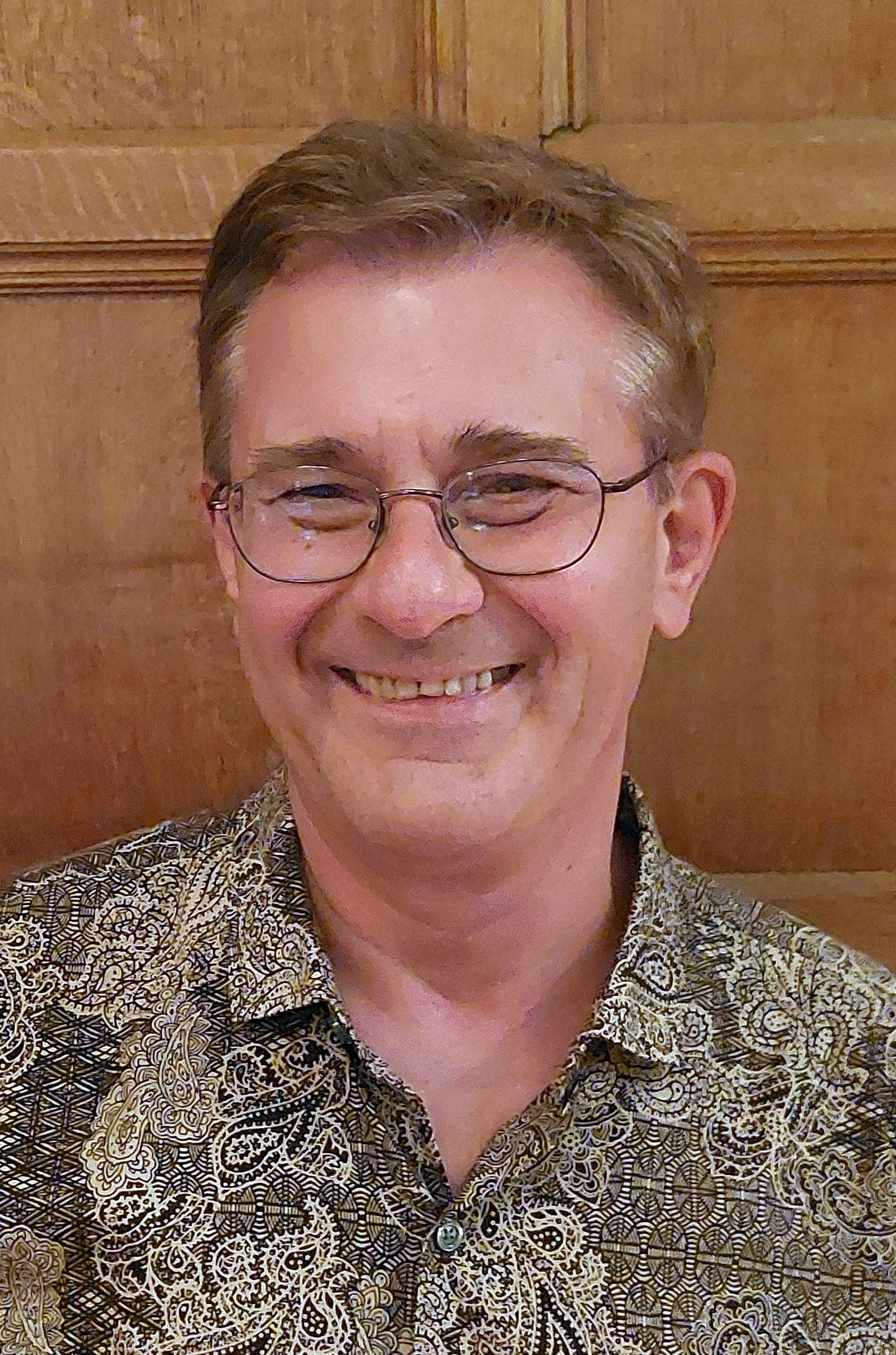
- Charles Kuta in Oxford, 2025
- Born: Charles Stanley Kuta; 1956 (age 69–70); Pennsylvania, United States
- Other names: Herb Kuta
- Education: Atlantic College
- Alma mater: University College, Oxford; Stanford University
- Occupations: Electronics engineer Software engineer
- Employer(s): Silicon Graphics; Pellucid; Quantum3D; Palm, Inc. CrowdStrike
- Known for: Co-founder of Silicon Graphics

Charles Stanley "Herb" Kuta (born 1956) is an American electronics engineer and software engineer who was a co-founder of Silicon Graphics, a major graphics workstation manufacturer.

== Biography ==
Charles Kuta was brought up in Pennsylvania, United States. He attended Atlantic College in Wales and then University College, Oxford, England, where he studied engineering science from 1974 to 1977, gaining a first class degree. While there, he also played tuba in the Oxcentrics, an Oxford-based Dixieland jazz band.

Kuta went on to study for a Master's degree at Stanford University in California, USA. While at Stanford, he was invited to be a co-founder of Silicon Graphics, Inc., by Dr. Jim Clark; the company was established in 1982. He was involved in the design of the pipelined Geometry Engine that undertook 3D graphical transformations in hardware.

Subsequently, Kuta worked at Pellucid and co-founded Quantum3D in 1997, where he was Vice President of System Software Architecture. Later, he worked for Palm, Inc., now part of Hewlett-Packard, and CrowdStrike.
