= Cue reactivity =

Learned response to drug-related stimuli in addiction

Cue reactivity is a type of learned response which is observed in individuals with an addiction, and involves significant physiological and psychological reactions to presentations of drug-related stimuli (i.e., drug cues). The central tenet of cue reactivity is that cues previously predicting receipt of drug reward under certain conditions can evoke stimulus-associated responses such as urges to use drugs. In other words, learned cues can signal drug reward, in that cues previously associated with drug use can elicit cue reactivity such as arousal, anticipation, and changes in behavioral motivation.

Responses to a drug cue can be physiological (e.g., sweating, salivation, brain activity), behavioral (e.g., drug seeking), or symbolic expressive (e.g., craving). The clinical utility of cue reactivity is based on the conceptualization that drug cues elicit craving, which is a critical factor in the maintenance and relapse to drug use. Additionally, cue reactivity allows for the development of testable hypotheses grounded in established theories of human behavior. Therefore, researchers have leveraged the cue reactivity paradigm to study addiction, antecedents of relapse, and craving, translate pre-clinical findings to clinical samples, and contribute to the development of new treatment methods. Testing cue reactivity in human samples involves exposing individuals with a substance use disorder to drug-related cues (e.g., cigarettes, alcohol, drug paraphernalia) and drug-neutral cues (e.g., pencils, glasses of water), and then measuring their reactions by assessing changes in self-reported drug craving and physiological responses, such as blood pressure, salivation, and brain activity.

== Cue types ==
Drummond (2000) identified a preliminary classification of cue types including four main categories: (1) Exteroceptive; (2) Interceptive; (3) Temporal; and (4) Cue relationship.

- Cues that are exteroceptive are characterized as external drug-related stimuli, such as sight, smell, and taste. Visual cues include sight of a preferred drug, or advertisement, or environment where drug use occurs (e.g., bar, house, neighborhood). Olfactory cues include smell of preferred drug or smells associated with drug use. Gustation cues include having a sip of alcohol or initial inhale of smoke. Cues that are exteroceptive are the most commonly studied in the laboratory.
- Interoceptive cues are characterized as internal cues, such as stress response, negative or positive mood, and withdrawal related states.
- Temporal cues relate to the proximity or distance to substance use and time of day.
- Complex relationships between cues.

For instance, cues occurring more proximally to the ingestion of a substance may be more salient and produce greater reactivity compared to distal cues. Additionally, the time of day at which cues are encountered may impact the salience of the cue, such that the time of day when a substance is habitually consumed may become a temporal cue (Drummond, 2000). For example, the end of a workday or a weekend day may become in and of itself a cue eliciting craving. Lastly, the theory behind cue relationships is that it is likely there is a complex relationship between cues. Drug cues rarely occur in isolation in the real-world, thus an inter-relationship between cues in eliciting cue reactivity is possible (Drummond, 2000). Such inter-relationship can be described as a “cue cluster,” “cue chain,” and “cue cascade.” A “cue cluster” describes co-occurring cues, such that each co-occurring cue is necessary for reactivity but not a sufficient condition for substance use. A “cue chain” describes the sequential relationship between cues leading up to use. For example, the sight of a preferred substance like an alcoholic drink may be more salient for an individual in a certain context like at a bar. Similarly, a “cue cascade” describes the process of each cue increasing the likelihood of encountering and the salience of the next cue.

== Theoretical background ==
Cue reactivity is most often conceptualized through models of classical conditioning, such that it is theorized that cues that are nearly exclusively encountered at the time of drug administration will develop the ability to predict the administration and effect of the substance. In other words, after systematic association of exteroceptive or interoceptive cues (i.e., conditioned stimuli) with drug administration (i.e., unconditioned stimuli), the cues will reliably signal administration and drug effects. When cues predict administration, they acquire the ability to elicit physiological and psychological responses (i.e., cue reactivity/ conditioned response) which increase the likelihood of substance use. Although there is a substantial amount of research on cue reactivity, the exact theoretical explanation of cue reactivity remains unclear.

=== Prominent models of cue reactivity ===
There are three prominent models of cue reactivity: (1) Conditioned withdrawal model; (2) Conditioned appetitive motivational model; and (3) Conditioned compensatory response model. In common across all three models is that they are all described in terms of classical conditioning and that cues repeatedly associated with substance administration will eventually elicit a conditioned reaction. The three models differ in the nature of the reaction that is elicited.

The conditioned withdrawal model, developed by Wikler (1948), characterizes the conditioned response as an unconditioned substance withdrawal state. For instance, during a drinking episode and individual with an alcohol use disorder is exposed to cues (e.g., sight and smell of preferred beverage containing alcohol) at a point when their blood alcohol level is falling (i.e., unconditioned stimuli), such as the morning after a heavy drinking episode. During this time the individual is likely in a state of unconditioned alcohol withdrawal (i.e., unconditioned response). The exteroceptive cue becomes associated with alcohol withdrawal. Therefore, during a period of abstinence and the individual is exposed to the exteroceptive cues (i.e., conditioned stimuli) a conditioned withdrawal-like reaction is elicited (i.e., conditioned response). The conditioned appetitive motivational model states that drug cues become associated with the pleasurable unconditioned effects of substances and leads to drug-like conditioned responses. In other words, the conditioned response resembles the unconditioned effect of the substance. The conditioned compensatory response model, formed by Siegel (1975), postulates that the conditioned response is opposite to the unconditioned drug effect, such that the conditioned response is part of a homeostatic response resulting in the development of drug tolerance. Each conditioning model is empirically supported.

=== Cognitive theories of cue reactivity ===
Although most theories of substance dependence acknowledge the role of conditioning and view this research as invaluable, not all theories assume that conditioning is sufficient in explaining this phenomenon as cue reactivity appears to be complex and highly individual. Therefore, cognitive theories have been proposed. The cognitive urge and automaticity model is a prominent cognitive theory of addiction and purposes that behaviors associated with substance administration become automatic and cues can trigger such automatized behaviors. This model is consistent with addiction models that emphasize habit-like processes. Additionally, cognitive labeling theory argues that the contextual and cue state an individual is in contributes to the interpretation of an arousal, such that a cue may trigger an arousal and the individual may perceive the cue as predicting substance administration which then triggers craving and substance intake. Other cognitive behavioral theories hypothesize that cues can elicit craving by highlighting the positive effects of the substance resulting in substance use. Lastly, attentional bias has been used to conceptualize cue reactivity in that substance-related cues can “grab” the attention of the individual engaging in substance use behaviors.

== Factors affecting cue reactivity ==
Cue, individual, contextual, and substance factors affect the salience of cue reactivity. Regarding cue characteristics, in vivo cues, cues that are directly experienced, have greater salience than imaginal cues (i.e., vividly imagined cue). Moreover, interoceptive cues (e.g., initial priming effects of substance) have been found to have greater salience than imaginal and visual cues. Overall, cues with greater association with substance consumption are likely to be more salient than cues with limited association. Research has found individual variability in cue reactivity. For instance, craving is highly variable among individuals and reactions to laboratory cues vary with some participants not showing much cue reactivity. Specific sources of individual variability include gender, genetic factors, personality (e.g., introversion, neuroticism, and impulsivity), and treatment status of the individual. Degree of alcohol dependence is an additional individual factor affecting cue reactivity, in that individuals who are more alcohol dependent are more cue-reactive. Additionally, context-specific expectancies such as perceived availability of a substance and efficacy expectations have been found to be important. Pertaining to substance factors, latency since last use is an important factor to consider. A critical component of this factor is the impact of withdrawal, such that withdrawal may increase the salience of cues. Similarly, an additional potential effect is the deprivation of one substance on another in that the deprivation of one substance will increase urge or reactivity of another substance.

== Cue reactivity in different substances ==
Research has shown that cue reactivity is experienced among individuals dependent on a variety of substances including alcohol, nicotine, opiates, and cocaine. However, research focused on these substances have been primarily done in isolation of each other and there are nuances regarding cue reactivity within each substance. The cues that elicit the greatest reactivity among those with an alcohol use disorder are the ingestion of a small amount of alcohol or expectancy of alcohol availability. The responses most commonly elicited from alcohol cue exposure among those with an alcohol use disorder includes increased salvation, increased sweating, and greater self-reported alcohol craving. The smoking cue-reactivity responses commonly reported are psychophysiological arousal including skin conductance, vasoconstriction, heart rate, and craving as the strongest response. Regarding opiates, auditory, visual, or role play of drug sales appear to be the most influential cues. Mood states may also significantly elicit cue-reactivity. Psychophysiological responses commonly elicited by opiate cues include decreases peripheral temperature and skin resistance. Cocaine cue reactivity is much less researched. Of the limited research, audiovisual stimuli of drug sales and consumption commonly elicit significant reactivity. Psychophysiological responses associated with cocaine use cues are decreased peripheral temperature, skin resistance, decreased heart rate, and greater self-reported craving.

== Cue reactivity and substance use relapse ==
Cue reactivity is predictive of relapse and reinstatement of dependence, which is empirically and theoretically supported. Even after extended periods of abstinence (i.e., years) cues are reported as preceding relapse. Moreover, the degree of cue-reactivity may predict individual differences in relapse risk. A study by Abrams and colleagues (1988) found that individuals who resumed smoking after smoking cessation had significantly higher interceptive cue reactivity (e.g., anxiety) and cigarette craving than those who continued cessation or controls. The authors concluded that it is suggested that reactivity to smoking cues plays a role in smoking relapse. A more recent study by Grusser and colleagues (2004), looked at the association between alcohol cues and relapse among a sample of detoxified, abstinent, patients with alcohol use disorder. Findings showed that greater visual alcohol cue-elicited activation of the dorsomedial prefrontal cortex (dmPFC) predicted resuming alcohol consumption following discharge. Moreover, findings from a review of two functional brain imaging studies investigating the association of stress and drug-related cues and relapse, suggested that specific regions of the corticostriatal limbic circuitry involving stress- and drug cue- induced craving are associated with drug relapse. Given the theoretical conceptualization of the influence of cue reactivity on relapse, it could be understood that greater cue-induced craving in the laboratory should predict risk for relapse in the real-world when similar cues are encountered in the natural environment. Therefore, psychotherapy and pharmacotherapy that blunts cue reactivity in the laboratory should be a marker of treatment efficacy in the real-world. This gives merit to research utilizing the cue reactivity paradigm as a relevant theory and treatment approach in addictions research.

== Cue reactivity paradigm in research ==
Cue reactivity is typically studied in a laboratory paradigm. This laboratory paradigm involves participants being systematically exposed to substance cues that elicit substance related responses. Cue exposure laboratory paradigms have a relatively standard protocol. First, participants complete a battery of baseline measures including psychological and physiological assessments (pre-exposure measurements). Second, participants are exposed to either a neutral or substance related cue. Third, psychological and physiological measurements are repeated (post-exposure measurements). A variety of cue presentations are utilized in this procedure, such as in vivo (e.g., sitting in front of a preferred substance like a bottle of beer), imaginal (e.g., vividly imagining situations related to drug use), audio (e.g., listening to a recording of someone describing substance use), pictorial (e.g., viewing pictures of substance use), and virtual reality. These cue presentations can also be in combination. For instance, the participant is interacting (smelling, seeing) with a preferred alcohol drink while listening to a recording recounting past substance use. It is recommended that researchers use both drug-related and neutral control cues (e.g., pencil, glass of water) rather than drug-related cues to pre-exposure baseline measures. Another recommended approach is for the neutral cue to have no psychoactive effect yet be similar to the active substance, like holding a pencil for a smoking cue paradigm. A variety of reactions to the cues are assessed, including self-reported craving and mood states, physiological changes (e.g., heart rate, skin conductance, salvation, blood pressure, skin temperature), and lever pressing (i.e., pre-clinical studies). More recently, the cue reactivity paradigm has been used in neuroimaging methods to study regional changes in brain activity following exposure to cues. The cue reactivity paradigm is a frequently used method within the addictions field because it allows for testing hypotheses regarding the additions process in a controlled laboratory setting and is grounded in theory.

=== Laboratory vs. real world cues ===
Although the cue reactivity paradigm was established in the laboratory which promotes standardization of cues to reduce noise within the paradigm, there is a lack of generalizability to real-world cue reactivity. This is an important limitation because cue reactivity is most salient to substance use when exposed to relevant cues at vulnerable times. Researchers have made efforts to make the cue reactivity paradigm more ecologically valid by having participants take digital pictures of their environments. Another more commonly used methodology is ecological momentary assessment (EMA) which involves real-time data collection in the natural environment. EMA methods allow for collection of real-time craving, mood, substance use, contextual information, which is not possible in a laboratory setting. These ecologically valid methods build on the classic cue reactivity paradigm and increase generalizability to the natural environment of those who use substances.

== Clinical implications ==
The cue reactivity paradigm is a useful method to understand pharmacotherapy and psychotherapy efficacy. This paradigm is used to evaluate treatment efficacy, given the hypothesis that reducing cue-elicited urge to use, or withdrawal can protect against continued substance use among those with substance use disorders. Moreover, treatments are often designed to mitigate craving and the cue reactivity paradigm allows for testing potential efficacy. Cue reactivity as an outcome measure that has been widely used in pharmacotherapy studies and is labeled as a gold-standard measure. For instance, Miranda and colleagues (2014) tested the effects of naltrexone, an opioid receptor antagonist, on adolescent alcohol cue reactivity. The study found that naltrexone blunted alcohol cue elicited craving in the laboratory and natural environment. Regarding psychotherapy, assessing cue reactivity has provided insight into potential relapse triggers and cue exposure has been used as a treatment approach. Given that substance related cues can promote substance use, common treatment strategies in cognitive behavioral therapy are to assist patients in identifying cues and developing strategies to avoid avoidable cues. In cue exposure treatment, patients are exposed to personally relevant substance cues through in vivo and imaginal exposures. Repeated unreinforced exposure to stimuli that was previously associated with substance use is thought to extinguish or rid the conditioned response to the personally relevant cues. Although cue exposure treatment has shown some benefit and has been validated in clinical trials, there is controversy around this approach.
