= Oxcentrics =

Jazz Band

The Oxcentrics
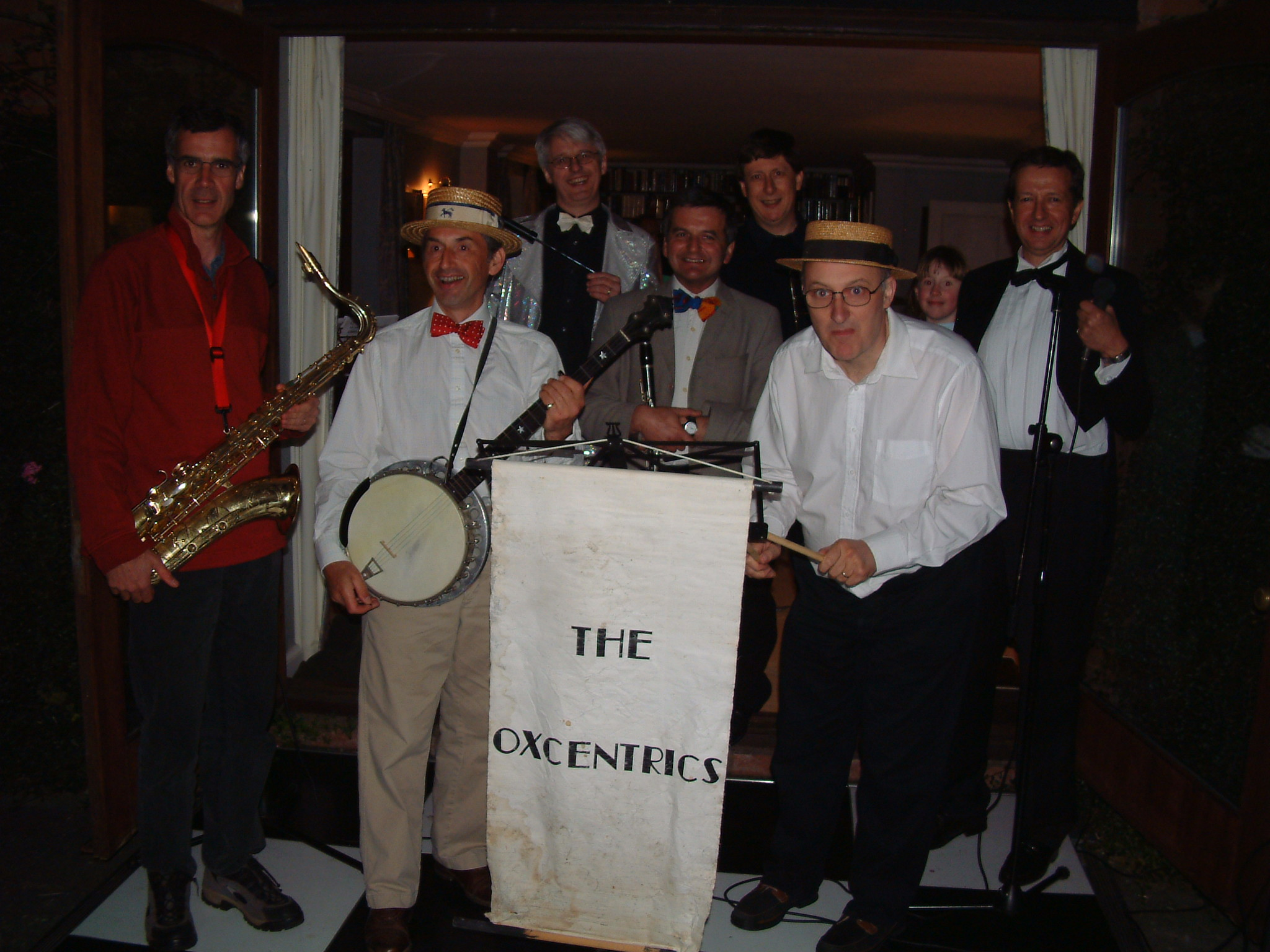
- The Oxcentrics in 2005

Background information
- Origin: Oxford, England
- Genre: Dixieland jazz
- Years active: 1975 onwards
- Members: Graham Downing, Charles Kuta, Glyn Lewis, Paul St John-Smith, Adrian Sheen, Mike Southon, Geoff Varrall, Simon Wallace, Oliver Weindling, Chris West
- Past members: Adam Brett, Billy Jenkins, Mark Lockheart, Colin Moynihan, Alan Shealy, Ashley Slater, Hugh Wallis
- Website: myspace.com/oxcentrics

The Oxcentrics is a Dixieland jazz band founded in 1975 at Oxford University. The band's name was derived from The Oxontrics, an original 1920s jazz band. Several (although by no means all) members were from University College, where many of the rehearsals took place. They played at a number of Oxford Balls, for the Oxford University Jazz Club, on May Morning, and for other events, including playing on punts on the River Cherwell in Oxford. The line-up, mostly Oxford University undergraduates, who recorded The Halcyon Days of the '20s & '30s on 29 February 1976 at the Acorn Studios in Stonesfield, Oxfordshire, and the songs recorded were:

Musicians

- Adrian Sheen — vocals
- Geoff 'Hot-Lips' Varrall — trumpet
- Adam Brett — trumpet
- Olly Weindling — clarinet
- Glyn Lewis — tenor saxophone
- Paul St John-Smith — trombone
- Charles 'Herbie' Kuta — tuba
- Simon 'Des' Wallace — piano
- Graham Downing — banjo
- Chris West — drums

Titles

1. Russian Rag
2. Tiger Rag
3. Don't Bring Lulu
4. Dixieland
5. Clarinet Marmalade
6. High Society
7. Petite Fleur
8. At the Jazz Band Ball
9. Sweet Georgia Brown

Adrian Sheen was the original bandleader and Mike Southon subsequently took over as frontman in late 1976 (as "Gorgeous Mike Vaseline"). Colin Moynihan was the original but short-lived pianist. Sally Jones tap danced for the band on occasions. Jonathan Bowen took many photographs and recorded the band in the 1970s. Further musicians who played with the Oxcentrics included Yva Thakurdas (trumpet) and Hugh Wallis (tuba). The band's manager was Laura Lassman.

The band continued in a changed form in London in the 1980s, managed by Olly Weindling, using many of the top young London jazz musicians such as Ashley Slater, Mark Lockheart and Billy Jenkins. Guests included Django Bates, Iain Ballamy and many others from Loose Tubes. In 1988, the Oxcentrics produced a CD, Oxcentromania! through Eccentric Records.

In 2005, the Oxcentrics reformed to celebrate their 30th anniversary. They also got together again in 2006 for a one-off gig at a ball held at St Hugh's College, Oxford, again in 2016 for a late 40th-anniversary gig, and in 2019 back at University College, Oxford, followed by a recording session. In 2020, during the COVID-19 pandemic, the band produced a distributed lockdown versions of the 1925 song Don't Bring Lulu and the 1918 song After You've Gone. In 2024, the Oxcentrics celebrated their 50th anniversary slightly early as part of the University College, Oxford 775th anniversary celebrations.

== See also ==
- Dixieland
- Jazz
- Trad jazz
