= Chris West =

British writer (born 1954)

Chris West (born 1954) is a British writer. He works in a range of genres: business, psychology, history and crime / general fiction. His four mysteries written in the 1990s were among the first crime novels to be set in the contemporary People's Republic of China.

== Biography ==
After studying economics and philosophy at the London School of Economics, West travelled in China, leading to his first book, Journey to the Middle Kingdom in 1991. Following that, he wrote the four crime novels featuring Wang Anzhuang, a mid-ranking detective in the Beijing Xing Zhen Ke (Criminal Investigation Department) and his wife, Rosina Lin, a nurse at the Capital Hospital. In 2020, these were reissued with new titles and Wang's name changed to Bao Zheng (a reference to a hero of traditional Chinese detective stories from the Song dynasty).

On completing this series, West concentrated on co-authoring books aimed at entrepreneurs and small businesses, the first of which was The Beermat Entrepreneur, co-authored with entrepreneur and speaker Mike Southon (Southon and West were both members of The Oxcentrics, an Oxford-based Dixieland jazz band, in which West played the drums.). This book was reissued in 2018 in an updated edition.

As a solo author he wrote Marketing on a Beermat and a guide to good, clear writing, Perfect Written English.

He has recently written social history, using everyday objects as 'ways in' to the subject. First Class, a History of Britain in 36 Postage Stamps was published in 2012, and A History of America in 36 Postage Stamps followed in 2013. Eurovision! A History of Modern Europe through the World's Greatest Song Contest was published in Spring 2017 and an updated version issued in 2020.

His first psychology book is The Karpman Drama Triangle Explained.

As a fiction writer he has published three novellas, two under the pseudonym Lytchett Maltravers.

West is married with one son and lives in North Hertfordshire.

== Books ==
- Journey to the Middle Kingdom, Simon & Schuster, 1991. Allison and Busby, 2000.
- Death of a Blue Lantern, Collins Crime 1994, Allison and Busby, 1999 and 2008.
- Death on Black Dragon River, Collins Crime, 1995
- Red Mandarin, Collins Crime, 1997
- The Third Messiah Allison and Busby, 2000
- The Beermat Entrepreneur: Turn a Good Idea into a Great Business, Mike Southon and Chris West. Prentice Hall, 2002. (Reissued several times.)
- Myths about Doing Business in China, Harold Chee and Chris West, Palgrave, 2004
- The Boardroom Entrepreneur, Mike Southon and Chris West. Random House Business Books, 2005.
- Sales on a Beermat, Mike Southon and Chris West. Random House Business Books, 2005.
- Finance on a Beermat, Stephen King, Jeff Macklin and Chris West. Random House Business Books, 2006.
- Marketing on a Beermat, Random House, 2008
- Perfect Written English, Random House, 2008
- Think like an Entrepreneur, Robbie Steinhouse and Chris West, Prentice Hall, 2008.
- First Class, A History of Britain in 36 Postage Stamps, Square Peg, 2012
- A History of America in Thirty-six Postage Stamps, Picador, 2014
- What's the Bloody Point of It All?, CWTK, 2019
- Eurovision! A History of Modern Europe through the World's Greatest Song Contest, Melville House, 2017 and 2020
- What's the Bloody Point of It All?, CWTK, 2019
- The Karpman Drama Triangle Explained: A Guide for Coaches, Managers, Trainers, Therapists and Everybody Else, CWTK 2020
- Footpath to Heaven (as Lytchett Maltravers), CWTK, 2020
- The Beijing Opera Murder, Sharpe Books, 2020
- The Hungry Ghost Murder, Sharpe Books, 2020
- The Red Mandarin Murder, Sharpe Books, 2020
- The Heavenly Kingdom Murder, Sharpe Books, 2020
- Twenty Sonnets, CWTK, 2020
- Unexpected Alien in Bagging Area (as Lytchett Maltravers), CWTK 2021
