= Quantum3D =

American computer graphics company

Quantum3D Inc.
- Industry: computer graphics
- Founded: March 31, 1997; 29 years ago
- Headquarters: Milpitas, CA, USA
- Number of employees: 50 (2020)
- Website: www.quantum3d.com

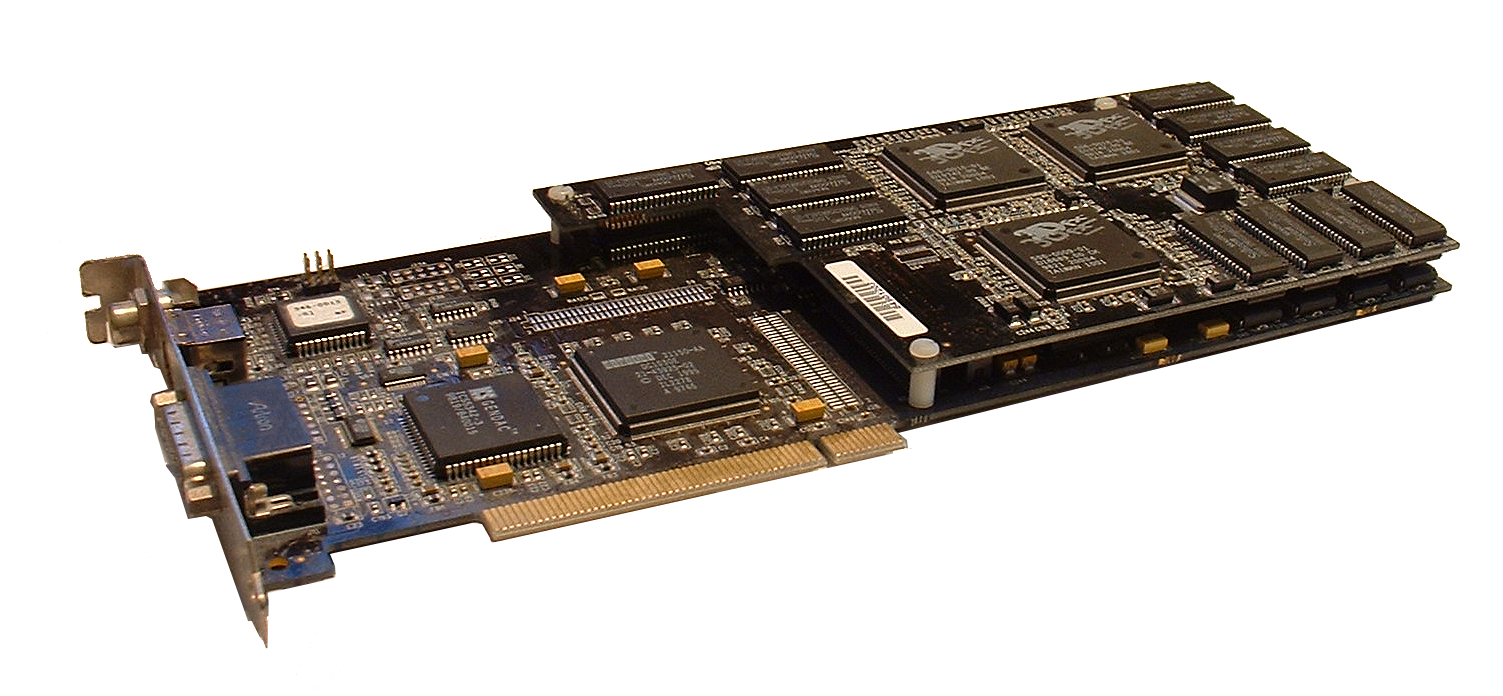
A single PCI video card from Quantum3D that combines two Voodoo2 boards in SLI configuration

Quantum3D Inc. is an American computer graphics company. It was founded in 1997 as a spin-off from 3dfx that was created to bring 3dfx's scalable graphics technologies (the Voodoo family of graphics chips) to the game enthusiast, coin-op/arcade/location-based entertainment (LBE) and visual simulation and training markets. Despite its close relationship with 3dfx in its earlier years, it was founded as an independent, venture-backed company.

== History ==
Quantum3D was founded principally by ex-3dfx employees, although it also counted staffers from Gemini Technology, SGI, Intel, Sun Microsystems among its co-founders. The co-founders include Ross Q. Smith, John Archdeacon, Charles "Herb" Kuta, Dan Downum, Phil Huelson, and Dale Stimson. The company's flagship line of Obsidian boards were initially marketed by 3dfx toward the coin-op/LBE market starting in March 1996, based on their Voodoo chipsets. On Quantum3D's foundation, the co-founders acquired the rights to the Obsidian trademark and patents from 3dfx. In 1998, it attempted to market video cards based on the Obsidian technology directly to consumers with the high-end Obsidian2 X-24 and X-16 line of AGP cards, as well as the low-end Obsidian2 S-12 PCI card.

The company has developed a range of 3dfx and now Nvidia-based board level and system level products for advanced, realtime 3D graphics and video intensive applications. Quantum3D was instrumental in bringing advanced graphics products to the PC-game enthusiast market, introducing the first graphics cards featuring a dual SLI configuration on one board with the X-24. It also brought commodity PC-based, open architecture systems to both the coin-op/arcade/LBE market and to the visual simulation and training market for both military and commercial applications. In addition, Quantum3D has also been a pioneer in bringing commercial off-the-shelf (COTS) graphics subsystems into the embedded visual computing (EVC) market for avionics, vetronics and command and control applications.

Concurrent with the sale of 3dfx assets to Nvidia in 2000, Quantum3D switched to Nvidia as its primary graphics technology supplier in early 2001. Since that date, Quantum3D has introduced a number of VSST and EVC products, including the AAlchemy and Independence family of COTS image generators for flight simulation and other training applications as well as the Sentiris PCI Mezzanine Card (PMC), ExpeditionDI dismounted infantry training system, Thermite tactical visual computer and Farsight programs that have resulted in COTS technology being placed in numerous commercial and military avionics and vetronics applications. The company also has a dedicated US Federal subsidiary, CG2, which provides visual computing related services and products to the United States Department of Defense via SBIR and BAA programs.

An initial public offering was planned for 2002 but never realized. In 2004, Quantum3D moved its primary 3D-rendering R&D studio from Huntsville, Alabama, to Orlando, Florida. The company is privately held and had approximately 50 employees as of August 2020.
