= Nathan Glantz =

Nathan Glantz (August 20, 1878 – August 6, 1937) was a Russian-born American saxophonist, clarinetist, and dance orchestra leader active during the 1910s–1930s. He was one of the earliest saxophonists to record regularly in New York studio orchestras and led his own ensemble for a decade.

== Life and career ==
Glantz was born in the Russian Empire on August 20, 1878. He is believed to have studied clarinet at a conservatory during his youth. He emigrated to Brooklyn, New York, in 1904. His wife Rebecca and daughter Dora followed in 1905. Two additional daughters, Elizabeth and Helan (later Evelyn), were born in the United States.

Although trained on the clarinet, Glantz adopted several other reed instruments after his arrival in America, including the alto saxophone, tenor saxophone, soprano saxophone, C-melody saxophone, and bass clarinet.

Glantz made his first recordings in December 1916 for the Victor Talking Machine Company with banjoist Fred Van Eps. He also recorded with Wilbur C. Sweatman for Emerson Records, whose playing influenced Glantz's style. In 1919 he appeared on the hit recording of “Dardanella” with Ben Selvin and His Orchestra for Victor and Paramount, performing the melody line on saxophone.

During the 1920s Glantz worked as a session musician in New York. He recorded with bandleaders including Sam Lanin, Dave Kaplan, Domenico Savino, Max Terr, Louis Katzman, Harry Raderman, Emil Coleman, Justin Ring, Charlie Fry, the Rega Dance Orchestra, and Joseph Samuels, with whom he was especially active from 1921 onward. He also accompanied singers such as Mamie Smith, Sophie Tucker, Frankie Marvin, Blossom Seeley, Vaughn De Leath, Oscar Grogan, Will Donaldson, J. Donald Parker, Byron G. Harlan, and Seger Ellis.

=== Orchestra leadership ===
Between 1921 and 1931 Glantz led his own orchestra, which featured musicians including Jules Levy Jr., Julius Berkin, Hymie Farberman, Earl Oliver, Jack Stillman, Irving Peskin, Red Nichols, Eph Hannaford, Sam Lewis, Joseph Samuels, Larry Abbott, Lucien Smith, Ken “Goof” Moyer, Larry Briers, Bill Perry, John Cali, Harry Reser, George Hamilton Green, and Joe Green.

His orchestra recorded under his own name and numerous pseudonyms for labels such as Columbia (including its budget imprints Harmony, Diva, and Velvet Tone, often as the Manhattan Dance Makers), Okeh, Emerson, Grey Gull, the Plaza/ARC group, Paramount, Puritan, Edison, Gennett, and Pathé Actuelle. He employed arrangers including Max Terr, Jack Stillman, and Bill Perry.

Glantz also led the Florida Four, a quartet featuring Dave Kaplan, Harry Reser, and an unidentified accordionist, which recorded for Edison.

== Death ==
Glantz died in Brooklyn, New York, on August 6, 1937. Some sources, including Mark Berresford's biography of Wilbur C. Sweatman, That’s Got ’Em!: The Life and Music of Wilbur C. Sweatman, list his year of death as 1945.

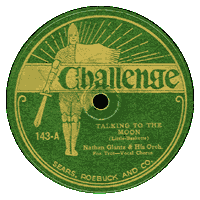
Talking To The Moon record

== Recordings ==
Nathan Glantz and His Orchestra had a number of aliases. The orchestra produced many recordings, including the following compositions:

- June Night (1924)
- Love Is Just A Gamble (1924)
- Oh Baby (1924)
- Don't Bring Lulu (1925)
- Bye Bye Blackbird (1926)
- Talking To The Moon (1926)
- Diane (1927)
