= Alcohol and Drug Foundation =

Australian not-for-profit organisation

- Alcohol and Drug Foundation
- Nickname: ADF
- Formation: 1959; 67 years ago
- Founded at: Melbourne, Australia
- CEO: Erin Lalor
- Website: adf.org.au
- Formerly called: Alcoholism Foundation of Victoria; Australian Drug Foundation; Alcohol and Drug Foundation of Australia

The Alcohol and Drug Foundation, created in 1959 as the Alcoholism Foundation of Victoria and formerly called the Australian Drug Foundation and the Alcohol and Drug Foundation of Victoria is a non-government, not-for-profit organisation based in Melbourne, Australia. The Alcohol and Drug Foundation's work is inclusive of both legal and illegal drugs on a national level and focuses on primary and secondary prevention.

The Alcohol and Drug Foundation is made up of several directorates that each aim to prevent drug problems, as opposed to treating existing problem users. An information dissemination arm, the DrugInfo Clearinghouse; a research arm; a community support program, the Good Sports Program; and an alcohol advocacy group, the Community Alcohol Action Network were part of the foundation. Of these groups, Good Sports is the only remaining active directorate; the Local Drug Action Teams program, Path 2 Help, and Drug Facts and Information Resources have since been established.

== History ==
The Alcohol and Drug Foundation was established in 1959 as the Alcoholism Foundation of Victoria. It was a response to the lack of services for alcohol-dependent people at the time and provided counselling and information. The Foundation called for a "coordinated attack by the community, involving education, treatment, and research". The foundation received opposition from the Australian federal government in the early 1970s, with a major grant application being rejected on the grounds that the foundation could not be recognized as "the national advisory authority in [its] area". Funding was secured in 1977, and the Foundation developed further over the coming decades.

In 2016, the organisation changed its name from the Australian Drug Foundation to the Alcohol and Drug Foundation. John Rogerson retired as CEO the following year, and the position was filled by Erin Lalor.

== See also ==
- Drug and Alcohol Review, an academic journal
- Foundation for Alcohol Research and Education (FARE), formerly the Alcohol Education & Rehabilitation Foundation
