= Dixieland (composition) =

1925 jazz song

- Dixieland, composed by Tex Grant, performed by Winifred Atwell, Philips record label, 1954

Song
- Released: 1954
- Recorded: 1954
- Genre: Dixieland jazz
- Composer(s): Tex Grant

"Dixieland" is a 1954 Dixieland jazz composition by Tex Grant.

The composition was published by Francis, Day & Hunter Ltd. in 1954. It was released as a single of 2 minutes 0 seconds in length, with Sorry Robbie by Bert Weedon on the B-side in 1960.

It has been performed and recorded by other artists and bands including Winifred Atwell in 1954 and the Oxcentrics.

== See also ==
- Dixieland jazz
