= Ooh Baby (You Know That I Love You) =

Song by George Harrison

from the album Extra Texture (Read All About It)
- Released: 22 September 1975
- Genre: Soul
- Length: 3:59
- Label: Apple
- Songwriter: George Harrison
- Producer: George Harrison

"Ooh Baby (You Know That I Love You)" is a song by English musician George Harrison, released in 1975 on his album Extra Texture (Read All About It). Harrison wrote the composition as a tribute to American singer Smokey Robinson, whom he often identified as one of his favourite vocalists and songwriters. The song was intended as a companion piece to Robinson's 1965 hit with the Miracles, "Ooo Baby Baby", and its inclusion on Extra Texture contributed to that album's standing as Harrison's soul music album. His impersonation of Robinson's celebrated vocal style on the track, including portions sung in falsetto, contrasted with Harrison's hoarse, laryngitis-marred singing on his 1974 North American tour and the poorly received Dark Horse album.

Harrison recorded "Ooh Baby" at A&M Studios in Los Angeles between April and June 1975, with backing from rock musicians Jesse Ed Davis, Gary Wright, Klaus Voormann and Jim Keltner. In addition, the recording features an overdubbed horn section comprising Tom Scott and Chuck Findley. The song's sombre tone and slow tempo reflect Harrison's dejected mood following the criticism of his tour the previous year. Partly as a result of these solemn qualities, the track is held in low regard by several music critics. Some commentators instead highlight "Pure Smokey", released on Harrison's 1976 album Thirty Three & 1/3, as the more effective of his tributes to Robinson.

== Background ==
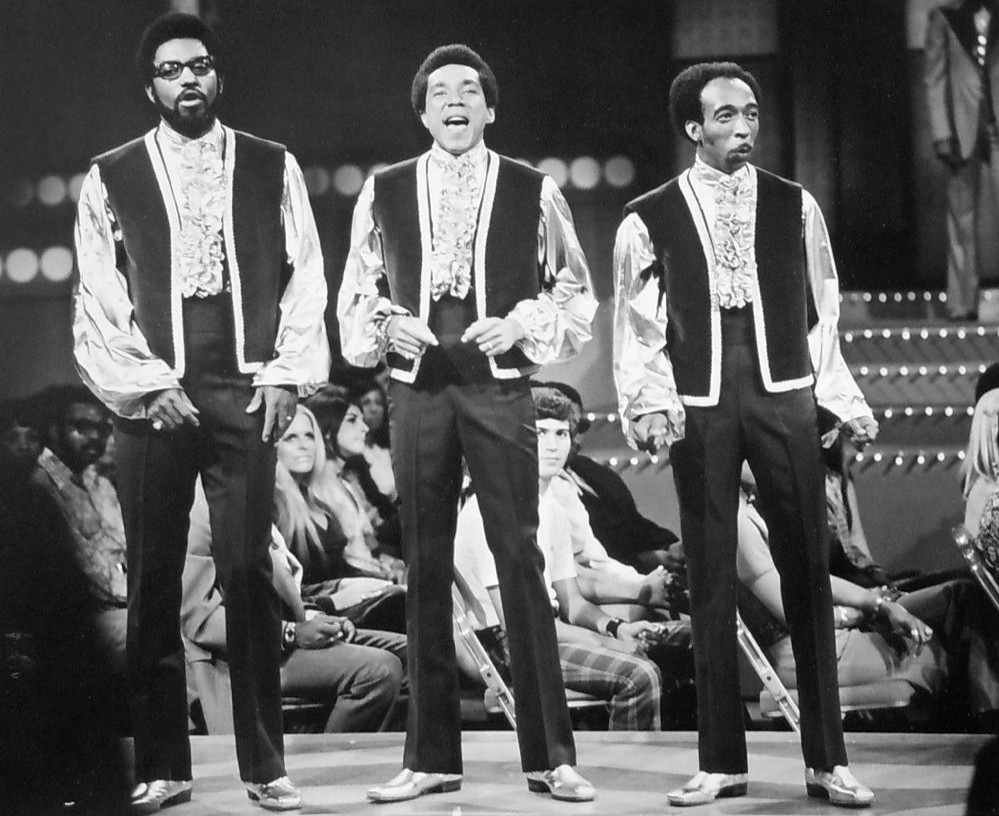
Smokey Robinson (centre) and the Miracles performing on an ABC Television special in 1970

George Harrison biographer Alan Clayson has written that, while all of the Beatles were influenced by Tamla-Motown artists in the early and mid 1960s, Harrison "listened hardest" to the Miracles, and particularly the group's lead singer, Smokey Robinson. In interviews during the 1970s, Harrison frequently praised Robinson as a vocalist and a songwriter, and once described him as having an "effortless butterfly of a voice". While the influence of soul music had been evident in Harrison's 1971 hit song "What Is Life", it was a genre that he began to embrace more obviously later in the decade, beginning with his 1974 collaboration with Faces guitarist Ron Wood, "Far East Man". Harrison's version of that song appeared on his Dark Horse album, a release that, like his concurrent North American tour with Ravi Shankar, was vilified by some sections of the music press, notably Rolling Stone magazine, a publication that had traditionally championed his work.

This critical backlash left Harrison emotionally battered, and came as a further source of personal upheaval following his split with wife Pattie Boyd in July 1974. Author Robert Rodriguez remarks on Harrison's choice of musical direction for his next album, Extra Texture (Read All About It): "Since it developed into a discernible genre in the late '50s/early '60s, soul [music] – as an outgrowth of blues – was the medium of choice among the oppressed to express their interactions with a world (or a romantic partner) that often misunderstood or abused them. As such, it proved the perfect format for George in his efforts to work through his many issues."

Harrison wrote the slow soul ballad "Ooh Baby (You Know That I Love You)" in the spring of 1975, shortly before starting recording for Extra Texture. The song was Harrison's musical tribute to Robinson. In an interview held at his Los Angeles home that April, with disc jockey Dave Herman, Harrison included Smokey Robinson among his preferred artists, along with Shankar, Bob Dylan and Eric Clapton, and added: "Musically, he's so sweet ... he makes you feel nice – he makes me feel good."

== Composition ==
In his musical biography of George Harrison, While My Guitar Gently Weeps, Simon Leng describes the song as a "spiritual brother" to the Miracles' 1965 hit "Ooo Baby Baby". Leng writes that Harrison employs "all manner of subtle chord voices" in the composition, including "elegant, jazzy thirteenths and major ninths". Author Ian Inglis comments on Harrison's "unexpectedly mournful" melody and suggests that the song "betray[s] a continuing, pessimistic reflection on recent events and circumstances in his life".

In an example of what Clayson identifies as the sparse, "cursory" lyrics found on much of Extra Texture, the words to the chorus in "Ooh Baby (You Know That I Love You)" repeat and improvise on the song title. Inglis describes this lyrical approach as "simplistic" and "seek[ing] to create emotion through mere repetition".

In the two verses, Harrison tells his lover – presumably Olivia Arias, Inglis suggests, his girlfriend and constant companion since October 1974:

I won't say it's forever
Right now, we're together ...

I will be where you want me
I will try to keep you happy ...

As with other songs of his that Leng terms "[obvious] pop cuts", such as "Don't Let Me Wait Too Long" and "Can't Stop Thinking About You", Harrison makes no mention of "Ooh Baby" in his 1980 autobiography, I, Me, Mine. While writing the song in 1975, Harrison began a second tribute to Robinson, titled "Pure Smokey". The latter composition was released on Thirty Three & 1/3 (1976), a collection noted for Harrison's apparent rediscovery of his gift for creating accessible melodies.

== Recording ==
The Extra Texture album is "unique within the Harrison catalog", Rodriguez writes, "as essentially an LP-length excursion into soul". While noting a pragmatic, commercial approach on Harrison's part with regard to making Extra Texture, Leng suggests that "Ooh Baby (You Know That I Love You)" was designed to create "crossover appeal to the R&B audience". Harrison recorded the album in Los Angeles during the late spring and early summer of 1975, while working on business related to his A&M Records-distributed label, Dark Horse Records, a recent signing to which was the soul group Stairsteps. Among several concerts the couple attended during their time in Los Angeles, Arias recalls that she and Harrison watched Robinson perform at the Roxy and that the singer was "really flattered" by Harrison's enthusiasm for his music. (Note: Arias adds that her and Harrison's shared love of Robinson's songs "kind of sealed our relationship".)

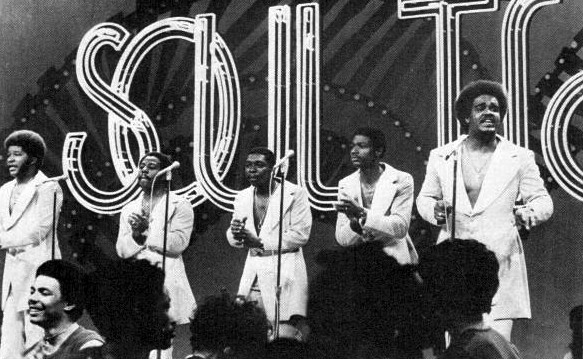
Harrison's soul-influenced sound on Extra Texture has been likened to the Philadelphia sound of the Stylistics

Harrison taped the basic track for "Ooh Baby" at A&M Studios in Hollywood on 25 April. Despite his apparent intention to create a genuine soul recording, Harrison worked with the same musicians associated with his previous, UK-recorded albums: Gary Wright (Fender Rhodes electric piano), Klaus Voormann (bass) and Jim Keltner (drums). (Note: While Inglis cites the "familiar cast" on Extra Texture as exemplifying Harrison's ideal of ongoing musical collaboration, Rodriguez notes the "tougher, funkier, and generally more upbeat" sound created by a change of personnel for Thirty Three & 1/3. The backing provided on that album primarily by Richard Tee, Willie Weeks and Stairsteps drummer Alvin Taylor, along with Harrison sharing his production duties for the first time since 1971, all contributed to "Pure Smokey" being, in Leng's words, "the most successful, and succinct, summation of [Harrison's] attachment" to the soul-music genre.) In addition, Jesse Ed Davis – who performed with Harrison, Voormann, Keltner and others at the Concert for Bangladesh shows in August 1971 – joined Harrison on electric guitar. Harrison's two guitar parts were treated with a Leslie rotary effect. Authors Chip Madinger and Mark Easter suggest that Wright may have overdubbed his contribution at a later date. Two members of Harrison's 1974 tour band, Tom Scott and Chuck Findley, added horns at A&M Studios on 2–3 June, with each musician overdubbing two parts.

Leng describes Harrison's vocal as "his best Smokey impersonation, almost going falsetto". Harrison's singing on Dark Horse had been the focus of critical scorn in America, after he contracted laryngitis on the eve of the 1974 tour. With his voice restored by early 1975, his vocals were close-miked during recording but mixed low on songs such as "Ooh Baby". Leng speculates of this effect that "the goal was to create a Harrison soul album for lovers", while Clayson views it as "the backbone of Extra Texture", similar to "the feathery emanations from Philadelphia by the likes of the Stylistics and Jerry Butler".

== Release and reception ==
Extra Texture (Read All About It) was released in September 1975, just nine months after Dark Horse, with "Ooh Baby (You Know That I Love You)" appearing as track 4 on side one in the LP format. The back of the Roy Kohara-designed album cover carried a dedication to Smokey Robinson. For the first time as a solo artist, Harrison undertook promotion for his album, in the UK, which included a song-by-song discussion with BBC Radio 1 DJ Paul Gambaccini. When discussing "Ooh Baby", Harrison said that he was "not anywhere in [Robinson]'s league" as a singer, but the song "always reminds me of that Smokey type of mood".

Among music critics, Nicholas Schaffner wrote in 1977, "even his disciples tended to find the music plodding and aimless". In another unfavourable album review from Rolling Stone, Dave Marsh opined that "Too often, Harrison's affectingly feeble voice is buried in a muddy, post-Spector mix" on Extra Texture, and that "Ooh Baby" "fails simply because he isn't much of a melodist". Neil Spencer of the NME wrote of "Ooh Baby": "the vocals try unsuccessfully to capture some kind of intimacy of soft soul. All form, no content, and you can't whistle it." Writing more recently, for Rough Guides, Chris Ingham pairs the song with "Can't Stop Thinking About You" as two examples of Harrison's "threadbare" compositions on Extra Texture and the "slick playing" found throughout the album. In a 2002 article on Harrison's solo career, for Goldmine magazine, Dave Thompson described the collection as "patchy" but listed "the contemplative (if somewhat Wings-ish) 'Ooh Baby'" as one of the few tracks that should not be "overlook[ed]".

Alone among Harrison's biographers, Elliot Huntley praises the song, calling it "a sincere pastiche of the Smokey Robinson gossamer" with a falsetto vocal "coated in velvet". While similarly admiring Harrison's singing, Simon Leng writes of Gary Wright's "chiffon" keyboard part and Tom Scott's "balmy horns charts", but he dismisses "Ooh Baby" as commercially driven and designed to "not offend anyone". Alan Clayson bemoans the "'Far East Man'-type lethargy" of this and other tracks on Extra Texture, an album he labels "[Harrison's] artistic nadir". Ian Inglis views the song as inferior to the Miracles' "Ooo Baby Baby", lacking the latter's "natural lightness of touch", and bemoans Harrison's "wholly inappropriate choice of melody". "Instead of creating a mood of happiness with what is," Inglis continues, "or excitement at what may be, the track produces an atmosphere of gloom and despondency that is quite removed from the positive emotions contained in the words."

Echoing Leng's admiration for "Pure Smokey", Madinger and Easter write of "Ooh Baby": "Not one of his more inspired efforts lyrically ... [Harrison] was to do a much better job of saluting Smokey on his next LP ..." Writing for Blogcritics in 2014, Seattle-based critic Chaz Lipp similarly opines: "Vocally he simply wasn't up to the Smokey Robinson pastiche 'Ooh Baby (You Know That I Love You)' ('Pure Smokey' on 1976's Thirty-Three & 1/3 is far better)."

In another review of the 2014 Apple Years Harrison reissues, for Mojo, Tom Doyle says of Extra Texture: "Here George sounds depressed, if R&B-soulful, with Ooh Baby (You Know That I Love You) sharing its DNA with Bowie's Young Americans ..." In his feature on Harrison in the same issue of Mojo, Mat Snow admires the track as "a sincere synth-soul tribute" and "perhaps the best song" on the album. Joe Marchese of The Second Disc describes it and "Can't Stop Thinking About You" as two tracks that "happily reflected [Harrison's] newfound bliss with Olivia".

== Personnel ==
- George Harrison – vocals, electric guitar
- Jesse Ed Davis – electric guitar
- Gary Wright – electric piano
- Klaus Voormann – bass
- Jim Keltner – drums
- Tom Scott – saxophones, horn arrangement
- Chuck Findley – trumpet, trombone

== Sources ==
- Keith Badman, The Beatles Diary Volume 2: After the Break-Up 1970–2001, Omnibus Press (London, 2001; ISBN 0-7119-8307-0).
- Harry Castleman & Walter J. Podrazik, All Together Now: The First Complete Beatles Discography 1961–1975, Ballantine Books (New York, NY, 1976; ISBN 0-345-25680-8).
- Alan Clayson, George Harrison, Sanctuary (London, 2003; ISBN 1-86074-489-3).
- The Editors of Rolling Stone, Harrison, Rolling Stone Press/Simon & Schuster (New York, NY, 2002; ISBN 0-7432-3581-9).
- Joshua M. Greene, Here Comes the Sun: The Spiritual and Musical Journey of George Harrison, John Wiley & Sons (Hoboken, NJ, 2006; ISBN 978-0-470-12780-3).
- George Harrison, I Me Mine, Chronicle Books (San Francisco, CA, 2002; ISBN 0-8118-3793-9).
- Chris Hunt (ed.), NME Originals: Beatles – The Solo Years 1970–1980, IPC Ignite! (London, 2005).
- Elliot J. Huntley, Mystical One: George Harrison – After the Break-up of the Beatles, Guernica Editions (Toronto, ON, 2006; ISBN 1-55071-197-0).
- Chris Ingham, The Rough Guide to the Beatles, Rough Guides/Penguin (London, 2006; 2nd edn; ISBN 978-1-84836-525-4).
- Ian Inglis, The Words and Music of George Harrison, Praeger (Santa Barbara, CA, 2010; ISBN 978-0-313-37532-3).
- Simon Leng, While My Guitar Gently Weeps: The Music of George Harrison, Hal Leonard (Milwaukee, WI, 2006; ISBN 1-4234-0609-5).
- Chip Madinger & Mark Easter, Eight Arms to Hold You: The Solo Beatles Compendium, 44.1 Productions (Chesterfield, MO, 2000; ISBN 0-615-11724-4).
- Robert Rodriguez, Fab Four FAQ 2.0: The Beatles' Solo Years, 1970–1980, Backbeat Books (Milwaukee, WI, 2010; ISBN 978-1-4165-9093-4).
- Nicholas Schaffner, The Beatles Forever, McGraw-Hill (New York, NY, 1978; ISBN 0-07-055087-5).
- Bruce Spizer, The Beatles Solo on Apple Records, 498 Productions (New Orleans, LA, 2005; ISBN 0-9662649-5-9).
- Gary Tillery, Working Class Mystic: A Spiritual Biography of George Harrison, Quest Books (Wheaton, IL, 2011; ISBN 978-0-8356-0900-5).
