= Mike Southon (writer) =

British entrepreneur, author, and lecturer

- Born: Michael Southon; 1953 (age 72–73); England, UK
- Other name: Mike Fab-Gere
- Education: Papplewick School; Wellington College; Imperial College London; University of Bradford
- Occupations: Entrepreneur, writer, lecturer
- Employer(s): Tate & Lyle; The Instruction Set; Bayes Business School; London South Bank University; University of Westminster
- Known for: Co-founder of The Instruction Set (1984)
- Notable work: The Beermat Entrepreneur (2002)
- Website: mikesouthon.com

Mike Southon is a British entrepreneur, author, and lecturer, best known as the co-author of The Beermat Entrepreneur (2002).

== Education ==
Mike Southon was educated at Papplewick School, Ascot, and Wellington College, Crowthorne, where he met his future co-author Chris West in 1967. He subsequently attended Imperial College London to study mechanical engineering, but left after a year. He worked at Tate & Lyle Research in Reading and then went on to the University of Bradford to study chemical engineering and management economics. He appeared on the television quiz show University Challenge with Anthony Finkelstein in 1980 for the University of Bradford team.

== Career ==
Southon is a serial entrepreneur, involved with many start-up companies. He was co-founder of The Instruction Set, a Unix training company, in 1984. The company was bought out by Hoskyns Group (now part of Capgemini) in 1989.

In 2002, he published The Beermat Entrepreneur with Chris West. This book critiques the approach to entrepreneurship taught in many business schools as overly corporate, presenting an alternative model in which customers are identified as quickly as possible and formal business planning is only undertaken once the entrepreneur is certain of the product and its market positioning.

The Beermat Entrepreneur has sold over 100,000 copies internationally, and has been translated into Chinese, Japanese, Russian, Spanish, and Dutch. It was followed by several other books, including two 'Beermat Guides' in sales and finance. A revised edition of The Beermat Entrepreneur was published in 2018.

Southon has been entrepreneur-in-residence at Bayes Business School, where he and Chris West taught 11-week modules in 'Introduction to Entrepreneurship' and 'Marketing Strategy' to Business Management Undergraduates. He has been the Entrepreneur in Residence for the City of Liverpool and the University of Westminster.

He has been an editor for The London Business Journal, a columnist for the Financial Times, and has written for The Guardian and The Daily Telegraph. His approach to sales has been covered in The Guardian. He has been a judge for the British Business Excellence Awards. He has been an invited speaker at conferences.

== Personal life ==
Southon has performed as the frontman for The Oxcentrics jazz band, and as his rock star alter-ego Mike Fab-Gere.

== Books ==
- The Beermat Entrepreneur: Turn a Good Idea into a Great Business, Mike Southon and Chris West. Prentice Hall, 2002. ISBN 0-273-65929-4. Also 2005, ISBN 0-273-70454-0.
- The Beermat Entrepreneur – Live, Mike Southon and Chris West. Financial Times / Prentice Hall, 2002. ISBN 0-273-66379-8. (Audio CD.)
- The Boardroom Entrepreneur, Mike Southon and Chris West. Random House Business Books, 2005. ISBN 1-84413-818-6.
- Sales on a Beermat, Mike Southon and Chris West. Random House Business Books, 2005. ISBN 1-84413-819-4.
- Finance on a Beermat, Mike Southon and Chris West. Random House Business Books, 2006. ISBN 1-905211-03-1.
- This is How Yoodoo it: Great Advice from Some of the UK's Top Thinkers on Entrepreneurship, Mike Southon. Ecademy Press, 2010. ISBN 978-1-905823-98-7.
- The Beermat Entrepreneur: Turn a Good Idea into a Great Business, 3rd edition, Mike Southon and Chris West. Pearson Education, 2018. ISBN 978-1-292-24383-2.
