= Oh Baby (Walter Donaldson song) =

Single by Frank Crumit
- B-side: "Sweet Alice"
- Published: 1923
- Released: February 8, 1924
- Recorded: December 21, 1923
- Genre: Traditional pop
- Length: 2:58
- Label: Victor
- Composer: Walter Donaldson
- Lyricist: Buddy DeSylva

Sheet music, 1923

Oh Baby (Don't Say No, Say Maybe) is a 1923 song by Walter Donaldson with lyrics by Buddy DeSylva. On December 21, 1923, it was recorded by Frank Crummit, vocal and ukulele, accompanied by Phil Ohman on piano, in New York, for the Victor label. That same December it was recorded by Billy Jones for the Banner label. Again for the Banner label it was recorded by the Lucky Strike Dance Orchestra in February 1924. It was recorded by the Wolverine Orchestra on May 6, 1924, in Richmond, Indiana for the Gennett Label. The Wolverine Orchestra was made up of Bix Beiderbecke on cornet, pianist Dick Voynow, trombonist Al Gandee, tenor saxophonist George Johnson, clarinetist Jimmy Hartwell, banjoist Bob Gillette, tuba player Min Leibrook, and drummer Vic Moore. Three days later, again in the Gennett studio, it was recorded by Bailey's Lucky Seven. It was recorded by Nathan Glantz and His Orchestra in March 1924 for the Emerson label.

It should not be confused with the 1928 song "Oh Baby" by Owen Murphy.
