= Dwight B. Heath =

American anthropologist

Dwight B. Heath (November 19, 1930 – 2017) was an American research professor of anthropology at Brown University in Providence, Rhode Island. He published extensively in many areas of anthropology, especially on the subject of alcohol drinking patterns and their relationship to culture. Heath earned his Ph.D. from Yale in 1959, as well as his undergraduate degree from Harvard. Heath critiqued the viability of neo-prohibitionism as an effective approach to reducing alcohol abuse and consults on a diversity of issues with governments and scientific organizations around the world. Heath died in 2017.

== Bibliography ==
- Heath, Dwight B. Drinking Occasions: Comparative Perspectives on Alcohol and Culture. Philadelphia, PA: Taylor and Francis, 2000.
- Heath, Dwight B. (Ed.) International Handbook on Alcohol and Culture. Westport, CT: Greenwood, 1995.
- Heath, Dwight B. American Attitudes toward Alcohol Lead to Underage Drinking. In: Egendorf, Laura K. (Ed.) Teen Alcoholism. San Diego, CA: Greenhaven, 2001.
- Heath, Dwight B. Culture and Substance Abuse. In: Mezzech, Juan E. and Fabrega, Horacio (Eds.) Cultural Psychiatry: International Perspectives. Philadelphia, PA: W.B. Saunders, 2001.
- Heath, Dwight B. (Ed.) "A Journal of the Pilgrims at Plymouth; Mourt's Relation" 1963
