= Robin Room =

Australian sociologist and researcher (born 1939)

Robin Gerald Walden Room
- Born: 28 December 1939 (age 86); Australia
- Education: Princeton University, University of California, Berkeley.
- Awards: Jellinek Award (co-winner, 1983), Prime Minister’s Award for Excellence in Drug and Alcohol Endeavours (2012)
- Scientific career
- Fields: Public health, health effects of legal and illegal drugs, sociology
- Workplaces: Centre for Alcohol Policy Research, La Trobe University, Stockholm University
- Thesis: Governing images of alcohol and drug problems: the structure, sources, and sequels of conceptualizations of intractable problems (1978)
- Website: www.robinroom.net

Robin Gerald Walden Room (born 28 December 1939) is an Australian sociologist and researcher who studies the health effects of alcohol and other drugs. From 2015 - 2017 he was the director of the Centre for Alcohol Policy Research at La Trobe University, formerly at Turning Point Alcohol and Drug Centre in Fitzroy, Victoria, Australia, as well as the Professor of Alcohol Policy Research at the School of Population Health of the University of Melbourne, since March 2006. Room is currently Distinguished Professor at the Centre for Alcohol Policy Research at La Trobe University. He is also a professor at the Centre for Social Research on Alcohol and Drugs at Stockholm University.

== Education ==
Room received his B.A. from Princeton University in English in 1960, and his two M.A.'s (the first in English, the second in sociology) from the University of California, Berkeley in 1962 and 1967, respectively. He later received his PhD in sociology from Berkeley in 1978.

== Career ==
Room began working at the National Alcohol Research Centre in Berkeley, California in 1963 and remained there until 1991. He became the centre's scientific director in 1977. From 1991 to 1998, he worked at the Addiction Research Foundation in Canada, as their vice president for research. In 1999, he was appointed professor and founding director of the Centre for Social Research on Alcohol and Drugs at Stockholm University, where he is still a professor as of December 2010. In 2006, he joined both the Centre for Alcohol Policy Research and the University of Melbourne in 2006.

== Research ==
Room's research pertains to alcohol, illegal drugs, and gambling behavior. For example, in a 2005 study, Room and his co-authors Thomas Babor and Jurgen Rehm found that about 4% of the global burden of disease was attributable to alcohol consumption, about the same amount as tobacco consumption.

== Editorial activities ==
Room is the editor-in-chief of the peer-reviewed journal Drug and Alcohol Review.

== Honors and awards ==
Room received the Alfred R. Lindesmith Award for Achievement in the Field of Scholarship from the Drug Policy Alliance in 2015. He has also received the Jellinek Award for Alcohol Studies in 1983, the Lifetime Achievement Award from the Alcohol, Tobacco and Other Drugs Section of the American Public Health Association in 2002, and the Prime Minister's Award for Excellence in Drug and Alcohol Endeavours in 2012. Robin Room was a founding member and the inaugural President of the International Kettil Bruun Society and was established as Honorary President in recognition of his service in 2011.
