= Don't Bring Lulu =

1925 jazz song

- Cover of sheet music (1925)

Song
- Released: 1925
- Recorded: Billy Jones, Billy Murray, and many others
- Genre: Dixieland jazz
- Composer: Ray Henderson
- Lyricist: Lew Brown / Billy Rose

Official audio
- "Don't Bring Lulu" on YouTube

"Don't Bring Lulu" is a 1925 Dixieland jazz song.

== Background ==
"Don't Bring Lulu" was first published by Jerome H. Remick, based in Detroit and New York City, United States, in 1925. It is the 63rd most covered song from 1925. "Lulu" in the song is a 1920s flapper. The song lyrics include a reference to the traditional nursery rhyme and singing game for parties, "London Bridge Is Falling Down".

The sheet music is credited to Billy Rose, Lew Brown, and Ray Henderson. It was originally a novelty song and was often recorded by male singers in a comic style, including Billy Jones and Ernest Hare for example, with additional dialogue. A praised recording was the 1960 single by Dorothy Provine, backed by Whisper Song. She also performed the song for the American television series The Roaring 20's, which was aired during 1960–1962.

== Recordings ==
The following performed and recorded the song in the year it was first published (1925):

- Ernest Hare and Billy Jones
- Billy Murray (1925)
- Van and Schenck
- Nathan Glantz and His Orchestra (vocals: Chick Straun)
- Hall and Ryan
- The Little Ramblers (vocals: Billy Jones)
- Jan Garber and His Orchestra (instrumental)
- Benny Krueger's Orchestra (vocals: Billy Jones)
- Sam Lanin and His Orchestra (vocals: Ernest Hare)
- The Gilt-Edged Four (instrumental)
- Jeffries and His Rialto Orchestra (vocals: John Thorne)

The following performed and recorded the song in later years:

- Frank Sinatra and Jack Carson (radio transcript) (1946)
- Tiny Hill and His Orchestra (vocals: Tiny Hill) (1953)
- The Andrews Sisters (with Billy May's Orchestra) 1958)
- Bobby Short (1959)
- "Big" Tiny Little (instrumental) (1959)
- Dorothy Provine (featured in the television series The Roaring 20's) (1960)
- Max Bygraves with Ted Heath and His Music (1960)
- Kay Barry (1961)
- Clinton Ford (1961)
- Victor Silvester and His Ballroom Orchestra (instrumental) (1961)
- Mitch Miller and The Gang (1962)
- Gery Scott (1962)
- Mrs Mills (instrumental) (1962)
- The Buffalo Bills (1965)
- The Billy Vaughn Singers (1969)
- The Oxcentrics (1976)
- Bobbysocks! (1985)
- Adam Swanson (piano, vocals: Frederick Hodges, additional modern lyrics) (2009)
- The Oxcentrics (2020, in lockdown)

Other recordings include:

- Ted Black and His Orchestra
- Stan Boreson and Doug Setterberg
- Russ Conway
- Graham "Smacka" Fitzgibbon
- Ugly Dave Gray
- Stan Foster and His 1920's Impression
- Sammy Kaye and His Orchestra
- Hanne Krogh
- Mike Mercado
- Benny Strong and His Orchestra

== See also ==
- List of 1920s jazz standards
