= Yale Food Addiction Scale =

Questionnaire to determine food addiction in individuals

The Yale Food Addiction Scale (YFAS) is a 25-point questionnaire, based on DSM-IV codes for substance dependence criteria, to assess food addiction in individuals. The scale was released in 2009 by Yale University's Rudd Center for Food Policy and Obesity.

It was found that the brain mechanisms in people with food addiction were similar to those in people with substance dependence, such as drug addicts. While there is currently no official diagnosis of "food addiction", the YFAS was created to identify persons who exhibited symptoms of dependency towards certain food. Foods most notably identified by YFAS to cause food addiction were those high in fat and high in sugar. A self-reported standardized tool was created by a Yale researcher, Ashley Gearhardt, to determine those individuals at high risk for food addiction, regardless of weight.

== Food addiction ==
The term food addiction remains a controversial topic. The concept of food addiction addresses a person's behavioral and neurophysiological changes with certain foods that closely resemble findings found in persons with substance dependence. The term became especially popular in the second half of the twentieth century, driven by the "obesity epidemic". Earlier studies suggest that food addiction, similar to that of drug addiction, mainly exert their actions through the dopamine and opiate pathways. Using functional magnetic resonance imaging (fMRI) subjects regardless of body mass index (BMI), with high food addiction score compared to those with lower scores, showed significant differences in brain activity. Furthermore, a study conducted by the Scripps Research Institute found that rats fed a high-fat palatable diet for extended periods, overstimulated the brain's reward system, similar to brain activity in drug addiction.

== Development ==
To address the need for a standardized tool to identify persons with food addiction behaviors, psychologist Ashley Gearhardt, along with her colleagues William R. Corbin and Kelly D. Brownell, developed the Yale Food Addiction Scale while completing her graduate research at Yale University as a clinical psychology doctoral student. Gearhardt and colleagues formatted their questionnaire to be based upon content of the Diagnostic and Statistical Manual of Mental Disorders IV "text revision" for substance dependence and was reviewed by experts in the fields of addiction, obesity, and eating pathology for revision.

== Content ==
YFAS contains 25 self-reported questions in dichotomous and Likert-type format. In the original scale, two items were included to determine the foods that triggered dependence. When filling out the questionnaire, subjects are asked to refer to the past 12 months of behaviors. The questions fall under seven specific substance dependence criteria as defined by the DSM-IV, as well as clinically significant impairment. The seven criteria per the instruction sheet for the YFAS are:

1. Substance taken in larger amount and for longer period than intended.
2. Persistent desire or repeated unsuccessful attempt to quit.
3. Much time/activity to obtain, use, recover,
4. Important social, occupational, or recreation activities given up or reduced.
5. Use continues despite knowledge of adverse consequences (e.g., failure to fulfill role obligation, use when physically hazardous).
6. Tolerance (marked increase in amount; marked decrease in effect).
7. Characteristic withdrawal symptoms; substance taken to relieve withdrawal.

Food addiction is recognized when an individual meets at least three of the above symptom criteria and scores for clinically significant impairment or distress.

== Foods emphasized ==
The YFAS survey identified certain foods that were likely to trigger dependence symptoms. These foods correlate with the high-fat, high-sugar foods selected in prior food addiction studies, however, the survey subject is instructed to think of any foods or food groups that cause positive symptoms identified in the questionnaire. The YFAS questionnaire lists the following foods:

- Sweets like ice cream, chocolate, doughnuts, cookies, cake, candy
- Starches like white bread, rolls, pasta, and rice
- Salty snacks like chips, pretzels, and crackers
- Fatty foods like steak, bacon, hamburgers, cheeseburgers, pizza, and French fries
- Sugary drinks like soda pop

== Modified scales ==
A shortened YFAS (mYFAS) consisting of only nine items was proposed in 2014 which had similar prevalence rates as the 25-item YFAS. To address the role food addiction plays in children, the original adult YFAS was adjusted. The Yale Food Addiction Scale for Children (YFAS-C) includes more age-appropriate activities, a lowered reading level, and a new scoring threshold.

A 35-item revised version of the YFAS (the YFAS 2.0) was published in 2016, reflecting the changes in the diagnostic criteria for substance dependence in the DSM-5. Although the YFAS and YFAS 2.0 substantially differ in terms of the number of items, response categories, item wordings, and scoring, it has been reported that prevalence rates and correlates of food addiction as measured with the YFAS 2.0 are largely similar to those with the YFAS. Similar to the YFAS, there is also a short version of the YFAS 2.0 (mYFAS 2.0) and a version for children (YFAS-C 2.0).

== Translated versions ==
The YFAS has been translated into several languages such as German, French, Italian, Spanish, Portuguese, and Chinese. Similarly, the YFAS 2.0 has been translated into several languages such as German, French, Italian, Turkish, Spanish, Korean, Arabic, Japanese, Malay, Chinese, Persian, and Portuguese.

== Limitations ==
Incidence of scores positive for food addiction were higher in overweight and obese patients. However, the correlation between YFAS scores and BMI is small and there seems to be a non-linear relationship between the two when considering the entire body weight spectrum from underweight to severe obesity. Previous studies have shown mixed results mainly due to limited sample size, concurrent eating disorders, and lack of clinical controls.

Five years after development of YFAS, Gearhardt and Adrian Meule summarized its utilization in research studies and its limitations. Gearhardt and Meule concluded:

"Although, the YFAS is not sufficient evidence that 'food addiction' exists, it does provide a standardized tool to identify individuals who are the most likely to be experiencing an addictive response to food."
