= Drug and Alcohol Review =

- Discipline: Addiction medicine
- Language: English
- Edited by: Robin Room

Publication details
- Former names: Australian Alcohol/Drug Review, Australian Drug and Alcohol Review
- History: 1982-present
- Publisher: Wiley-Blackwell
- Frequency: 7/year
- Impact factor: 3.8 (2022)

Standard abbreviations
- ISO 4: Drug Alcohol Rev.

Indexing
- ISSN: 0959-5236 (print); 1465-3362 (web)
- LCCN: sn90031390
- OCLC no.: 1000991359

Links
- Journal homepage; Online access; Online archive

Drug and Alcohol Review is a peer-reviewed medical journal covering research related to alcohol and drug-related problems. It is the official journal of the Australasian Professional Society on Alcohol and other Drugs. It publishes seven issues annually.

The journal is published by Wiley and the editor-in-chief is Robin Room (La Trobe University). According to the Journal Citation Reports, the journal had an impact factor of 2.9 in 2025, ranking it 17th out of 61 journals in the category "Substance Abuse Social Science)".

The journal was established in 1982 as Australian Alcohol – Drug Review, and changed its name to Australian Drug and Alcohol Review in 1986. In 1990 it obtained its current name.

== See also ==
- Alcohol and Drug Foundation
- Foundation for Alcohol Research and Education
