= Naomi Wray =

Australian statistical geneticist and researcher

Professor Naomi Wray FAA FAHMS
- Citizenship: Australian
- Education: University of Edinburgh (BSc, 1984; PhD, 1989); Cornell University (MS, 1986)
- Known for: Research on genetic architecture of complex traits
- Scientific career
- Fields: Quantitative genetics
- Institutions: University of Queensland
- Thesis: Consequences of selection in finite populations with particular reference to closed nucleus herds of pigs (1989)
- Doctoral advisors: Bill Hill; Robin Thompson

Naomi Ruth Wray is an Australian statistical geneticist at the University of Queensland, where she is a Professorial Research Fellow at the Institute for Molecular Bioscience and an Affiliate Professor in the Queensland Brain Institute. She is also a National Health and Medical Research Council (NHMRC) Principal Research Fellow and, along with Peter Visscher and Jian Yang, is one of the three executive team members of the NHMRC-funded Program in Complex Trait Genomics. She is also the Michael Davys Chair of Psychiatric Genetics at Oxford University. Naomi pioneered the use of polygenic scores in human genetics, and has made significant contributions to both the development of methods and their clinical use.

== Education and career ==
Wray has a B.Sc. in Agricultural Science from the University of Edinburgh (1984), and an M.S. in livestock genetics and statistics from Cornell University in 1986. She earned her Ph.D. in 1989 from the University of Edinburgh where she worked on population genetics. Her first academic career was in livestock genetics, before she transitioned her research to human genetics following the development of technology that allowed the direct study of DNA variation at scale. Now, she primarily focusses on disorders of the brain, addressing the fundamental questions about why only certain people get common diseases, and why only certain people respond to treatment. Wray joined the University of Queensland Brain Institute in 2011, prior to moving to the Institute of Molecular Bioscience (IMB) in 2015. From 2018-2023 she was the Head of the Centre for Population and Disease Genomics within IMB. Wray is now appointed at the University of Oxford as the Michael Davys Professor in the Department of Psychiatry.

Her research primarily focuses on the development and application of quantitative genetics and genomics methodologies across complex diseases, disorders and traits, specifically psychiatric-related traits.

Wray was one of the scientists who helped discover three new genes that increase the risk of sporadically developing motor neuron disease (MND), funding for which was raised through videos of "the ice bucket challenge" in 2014. She stated that researchers are "very hopeful that in the next phase of discovery, as sample sizes with measured DNA increase, that we'll discover more genes associated with MND".

Wray directed the Program in Complex Trait Genomics (PCTG) which was funded as an NHMRC Program Grant from 2017-2022, and contributes to the International Psychiatric Genomics Consortium. She is a co-investigator on the Australian Genetics of Depression Study (AGDS), and is currently launching the AGDS-Cello project which focusses on establishing a cell line resource from participant with a detailed history of anti-depressant use and response measures.

== Selected publications ==
- "Genome-wide association analyses identify 44 risk variants and refine the genetic architecture of major depression". Nature Genetics. 50 (5): 668–681. 2018. doi:10.1038/s41588-018-0090-3. ISSN 1061-4036. PMC 5934326. PMID 29700475.
- Visscher, Peter M.; Wray, Naomi R.; Zhang, Qian; Sklar, Pamela; McCarthy, Mark I.; Brown, Matthew A.; Yang, Jian (6 July 2017). "10 Years of GWAS Discovery: Biology, Function, and Translation". The American Journal of Human Genetics. 101 (1): 5–22. doi:10.1016/j.ajhg.2017.06.005. ISSN 0002-9297. PMC 5501872. PMID 28686856.
- Wray, Naomi R.; Yang, Jian; Hayes, Ben J.; Price, Alkes L.; Goddard, Michael E.; Visscher, Peter M. (2013). "Pitfalls of predicting complex traits from SNPs". Nature Reviews Genetics. 14 (7): 507–515. doi:10.1038/nrg3457. ISSN 1471-0056. PMC 4096801. PMID 23774735.
- Wray, Naomi R.; Goddard, Michael E.; Visscher, Peter M. (1 October 2007). "Prediction of individual genetic risk to disease from genome-wide association studies". Genome Research. 17 (10): 1520–1528. doi:10.1101/gr.6665407. ISSN 1088-9051. PMC 1987352. PMID 17785532.

== Awards and honours ==
Wray is a Leadership Fellow at the NHMRC, a Fellow of the Australian Academy of Science as of 2016, and a Fellow of the Australian Academy of Health and Medical Sciences as of 2020. Awards include the Australian Neuroscience Society Nina Kondelos Award 2016 (awarded to female neuroscientists for outstanding contributions to basic or clinical neuroscience research), the NHMRC Elizabeth Blackburn Award for Leadership in Basic Science 2020, and the International Society of Psychiatric Genetics Ming Tsuang Lifetime Achievement Award 2021. She was elected a Fellow of the Academy of Medical Sciences in 2025. She is also a Clarivate Highly Cited researcher.
