= Oliver Weindling =

Oliver Weindling (born 1955) is a British jazz promoter and founder of the Babel jazz record label and a Director of the Vortex Jazz Club.

== Background ==
He came from a family that encouraged his interest in music, being taken to the opera and concerts regularly. Originally an economist by training with degrees from Balliol College, Oxford and London School of Economics and ten years working in various banks and other organisations. He nevertheless became more and more involved with music, as a performer, such as clarinettist with The Oxcentrics, and latterly as an organiser.

Weindling started the Babel Label in 1994, which has since had over 150 releases ranging from Penny Rimbaud to Billy Jenkins to Polar Bear and Acoustic Ladyland. He is also a director of the Vortex Jazz Club and was instrumental in achieving the successful move of the club from Stoke Newington to the Dalston Culture House. He is a director of Radio Jazz Research in Germany. He has regularly contributed articles to the website of the Vortex Jazz Club and of Londonjazznews.

He was nominated for a BBC Jazz Award in 2008 for Services to Jazz and was awarded an Honorary ARAM degree from the Royal Academy of Music in 2009.
