= Stephan Ripke =

Stephen Ripke
- Born: April 4th 1973; Heidelberg
- Education: University of Hamburg (M.D., 2001); Utrecht University (Ph.D., 2014)
- Awards: Brain & Behavior Research Foundation Sidney R. Baer, Jr., Prize for Innovative and Promising Schizophrenia Research (2014)
- Scientific career
- Fields: Statistical genetics
- Institutions: Massachusetts General Hospital Charité
- Thesis: Common DNA sequence variation and psychiatric disease (2014)

Stephan Ripke is a German statistical geneticist and Research Scientist in the Analytic and Translational Genetics Unit at Massachusetts General Hospital. He is also affiliated with the Broad Institute. He is a leader of the Statistical Analysis Group of the Psychiatric Genomics Consortium. He earned his Ph.D. cum laude from Utrecht University in 2014. He received the Sidney R. Baer, Jr., Prize for Innovative and Promising Schizophrenia Research from the Brain & Behavior Research Foundation in 2014, and was awarded a Young Investigator Grant from them in 2015.

Since April 2018 Stephan Ripke is leading the GWAS Research Unit (GResU) as a Heisenberg Professor at the department for Psychiatry and Psychotherapy at Charité Mitte in Berlin, Germany.
