= Research Domain Criteria =

Diagnostic framework in personalized psychiatry

RDoC
- Research Domain Criteria
- Project type: Research framework
- Sponsors: National Institute of Mental Health
- Project coordinator: Bruce Cuthbert
- Duration: January 28, 2010 –
- Website: NIMH.NIH.gov/Research-priorities/rdoc

The Research Domain Criteria (RDoC) project is an initiative of personalized medicine in psychiatry developed by US National Institute of Mental Health (NIMH). In contrast to the Diagnostic and Statistical Manual of Mental Disorders (DSM) maintained by the American Psychiatric Association (APA), RDoC aims to address the heterogeneity in the current nosology by providing a biologically based, rather than symptom-based, framework for understanding mental disorders. "RDoC is an attempt to create a new kind of taxonomy for mental disorders by bringing the power of modern research approaches in genetics, neuroscience, and behavioral science to the problem of mental illness."

== Call for creation ==
The National Institute of Mental Health oversees the RDoC initiative.

The 2008 NIMH Strategic Plan calls for NIMH to "Develop, for research purposes, new ways of classifying mental disorders based on dimensions of observable behavior and neurobiological measures." The strategic plan continues:

Currently, the diagnosis of mental disorders is based on clinical observation—identifying symptoms that tend to cluster together, determining when the symptoms appear, and determining whether the symptoms resolve, recur, or become chronic. However, the way that mental disorders are defined in the present diagnostic system does not incorporate current information from integrative neuroscience research, and thus is not optimal for making scientific gains through neuroscience approaches. It is difficult to deconstruct clusters of complex behaviors and attempt to link these to underlying neurobiological systems. Many mental disorders may be considered as falling along multiple dimensions (e.g., cognition, mood, social interactions), with traits that exist on a continuum ranging from normal to extreme. Co-occurrence of multiple mental disorders might reflect different patterns of symptoms that result from shared risk factors and perhaps the same underlying disease processes.

To clarify the underlying causes of mental disorders, it will be necessary to define, measure, and link basic biological and behavioral components of normal and abnormal functioning. This effort will require integration of genetic, neuroscience, imaging, behavioral, and clinical studies. By linking basic biological and behavioral components, it will become possible to construct valid, reliable phenotypes (measurable traits or characteristics) for mental disorders. This will help us elucidate the causes of the disorder, while clarifying the boundaries and overlap between mental disorders. In order to understand mental disorders in terms of dimensions and/or components of neurobiology and behaviors, it will be important to:

- Initiate a process for bringing together experts in clinical and basic sciences to jointly identify the fundamental behavioral components that may span multiple disorders (e.g., executive functioning, affect regulation, person perception) and that are more amenable to neuroscience approaches.
- Develop reliable and valid measures of these fundamental components of mental disorders for use in basic studies and in more clinical settings.
- Determine the full range of variation, from normal to abnormal, among the fundamental components to improve understanding of what is typical versus pathological.
- Integrate the fundamental genetic, neurobiological, behavioral, environmental, and experiential components that comprise these mental disorders.

== Contrast with DSM ==
On April 29, 2013, a few weeks before the publication of the DSM-5, NIMH director Thomas Insel published a blog post critical of the DSM methodology and highlighting the improvement offered by the RDoC project.

Wrote Insel:

While DSM has been described as a 'Bible' for the field, it is, at best, a dictionary, creating a set of labels and defining each. The strength of each of the editions of DSM has been "reliability" – each edition has ensured that clinicians use the same terms in the same ways. The weakness is its lack of validity. Unlike our definitions of ischemic heart disease, lymphoma, or AIDS, the DSM diagnoses are based on a consensus about clusters of clinical symptoms, not any objective laboratory measure.

In that post, Insel wrote: "Patients with mental disorders deserve better." He would later elaborate on this point, saying "I look at the data and I'm concerned. ... I don't see a reduction in the rate of suicide or prevalence of mental illness or any measure of morbidity. I see it in other areas of medicine and I don't see it for mental illness. That was the basis for my comment that people with mental illness deserve better."

In their effort to resolve their issues with the new DSM, the NIMH launched the Research Domain Criteria Project (RDoC), based on four assumptions:

- A diagnostic approach based on the biology as well as the symptoms must not be constrained by the current DSM categories,
- Mental disorders are biological disorders involving brain circuits that implicate specific domains of cognition, emotion, or behavior,
- Each level of analysis needs to be understood across a dimension of function,
- Mapping the cognitive, circuit, and genetic aspects of mental disorders will yield new and better targets for treatment.

Insel stressed that the RDoC is not designed as diagnostic criteria to replace the DSM, but rather as a research framework, for future development. His argument centers around the claim that, "symptom-based diagnosis, once common in other areas of medicine, has been largely replaced in the past half century as we have understood that symptoms alone rarely indicate the best choice of treatment." As a result of this position, the NIMH is no longer using the DSM as the criteria upon which they will evaluate funding of future clinic trials.

DSM researcher Eric Hollander was quoted as saying "I do think it does represent a lack of interest and faith on behalf of NIMH for the DSM process and an investment in alternative diagnostic systems."

A NIMH description of RDoC explained:

Currently, diagnosis in mental disorders is based on clinical observation and patients' phenomenological symptom reports ... However, in antedating contemporary neuroscience research, the current diagnostic system is not informed by recent breakthroughs in genetics; and molecular, cellular and systems neuroscience.

== RDoC matrix ==
The RDoC matrix is one way of organizing the concepts involved, with domains as tables, constructs as rows, sub-constructs as subrows and units of analysis often presented as columns.

Negative Valence Systems, as of January 2022
Construct	Genes	Molecules	Cells	Circuits	Physiology	Behavior	Self-reports	Paradigms
Acute Threat (Fear)	n/a	BDNF; CCK; Cortisol / Corticosterone; CRF family; Dopamine; Endogenous cannabinoid; FGF2; GABA; Glutamate; Neuropeptide S; Neurosteroid; NMDAR; NPY; OX; Oxytocin; Serotonin; Vasopressin	GABAergic cells; Glia; Neuron; Pyramidal cell	Amg; basal; aCeN; lateral; medial; ACC; dorsal; rostral; ANS; Hi; posterior; anterior; Hy; ICMs; Ins; OFC; PAG; dorsal; ventral; Pons; LC; PFC; vmPFC (il); dmPFC (pl); LPFC/Ins; RPVM	BP; EDA; EMG; facial; Eye tracking; Heart rate; Pupillometry; Breathing; Response accuracy; Startle; context; fear-potentiated	Analgesia (reduced pain perception); Early developmental approach; Avoidance; Facial expression; Freezing; Open field; Inhibitory control; Response time; Risk assessment; Social approach	Fear survey schedule; SUDS	Behavioral approach test; CO_{2} challenge test; Cold pressor test; Fear conditioning; Stranger tests; Trier social stress test
Potential Threat (Anxiety)	n/a	Cortisol; CRF family	Pituitary cells	BNST	ACTH; Average cortisol levels; Potentiated startle	n/a	Anxiety Sensitivity Index; BIS; Fear of Negative Evaluation Scale; Intolerance of Uncertainty Scale; LEDS	NPU Threat Task
Sustained Threat	n/a	ACTH; CRF; HPA axis hormones	Hi; Microglia; prefrontal	Attention network; Dysregulation of Amg reactivity; Dysregulation of cingulate reactivity; Habit systems; Striatum; Caudate; Accumbens; Hy nuclei; PVT; Vigilance network	Dysregulated HPA axis; Error-related negativity	Anhedonia/decreased appetitive behavior; Anxious arousal; Attentional bias to threat; Avoidance; Decreased libido; Helplessness behavior; Increased conflict detection; Increased perseverative behavior; Memory retrieval deficits; Punishment sensitivity	Childhood Trauma Questionnaire; LEDS; Risky Families; STRAIN; TESI; Youth Life Stress Interview	n/a
Loss	n/a	Androgen; CRH; Estrogen; Glucocorticoid receptor; Inflammatory molecules; Oxt; ADH	n/a	Amg; Default mode network; DLPFC; Habit systems; Striatum; Caudate; Accumbens; Hi; Ins; OFC; Parietal cortex; PCC; PVN; Reward circuitry; vmPFC	ANS; HPA; neuroimmune; Prolonged psychophysiological reactivity	Amotivation; Anhedonia; Attentional bias to negative valenced information; Crying; Executive function; Guilt; Increased self-focus; Loss of drive; Loss-relevant recall bias; Morbid thoughts; Psychomotor retardation; Rumination; Sadness; Shame; Withdrawal; Worry	LEDS; STRAIN	Sadness eliciting film clips
Frustrative Nonreward	n/a	Dopamine; GABA; Glutamate; Serotonin; Steroids; ADH	n/a	Amg; Hy; LC; OFC; PAG; PNS; Septum; Striatum	n/a	Relational and physical aggression	Frustrative Nonreward Responsiveness Subscale; Questionnaire of Daily Frustrations	Lab-TAB; PSAP

Positive Valence Systems, as of January 2022
Construct / Subconstruct		Genes	Molecules	Cells	Circuits	Physiology	Behavior	Self-reports	Paradigms
Reward Responsiveness	Reward Anticipation	n/a	n/a	n/a	n/a	n/a	n/a	n/a	Monetary incentive delay
Reward Responsiveness	Initial Response to Reward	n/a	CREB; Endocannabinoids; FosB; Glutamate; Mu and delta opioid; Orexin	n/a	Anterior Ins; Dorsal ACC; LH; Medial OFC; Nucleus accumbens; Ventral pallidum; Ventromedial PFC; VTA	n/a	Taste reactivity	Consummatory subscale of TEPS; PANAS (state version)	Simple guessing task
Reward Responsiveness	Reward Satiation	n/a	n/a	n/a	n/a	n/a	n/a	n/a	Fixed-ratio satiation schedule
Reward Learning	Probabilistic and Reinforcement Learning	n/a	n/a	n/a	n/a	n/a	n/a	n/a	Drifting double bandit; Classical conditioning; Probabilistic reward task; Probabilistic stimulus selection task
Reward Learning	Reward Prediction Error	n/a	Dopamine; Serotonin	n/a	Amg; BG; Dorsal ACC; Lateral habenula; OFC; Rostral medial tegmentum; Substantia nigra/VTA; Ventral striatum	Cortical slow waves; Heart rate change; Skin conductance	Goal tracking; Pavlovian approach; Reward-related speeding; Sign tracking	Affective forecasting; ASAM scale; Eating Expectancy Inventory; Generalized reward and punishment expectancy scale; Self-report of craving; TEPS anticipatory scale	Drifting Double Bandit; Rutledge Passive Lottery Task
Reward Learning	Habit - PVS	n/a	Acetylcholine; Co-released neuromodular glutamate; CREB; Dopamine and dopamine-related molecules; FosB	Dopaminergic neurons; medium spiny neurons; Substantia Nigra	dorsal striatum; Medial Prefrontal Cortex; SN/VTA; Ventral striatum	n/a	Compulsive behaviors; Repetitive behaviors; Stereotypic behaviors	Aberrant behaviors checklist; Measures of repetitive behaviors	Devaluation task; Habit Learning TaskHabit Task
Reward Valuation	Reward (probability)	n/a	n/a	n/a	n/a	n/a	n/a	n/a	Probability Choice Task; Willingness to Pay Task
Reward Valuation	Delay	n/a	n/a	n/a	n/a	n/a	n/a	n/a	Delay discounting
Reward Valuation	Effort	n/a	Adenosine; Dopamine; GABA	n/a	Basolateral amygdala; dorsal ACC; Ventral pallidum; Ventral striatum (nACC); VTA	n/a	n/a	Drive subscale of the Behavioral Activation Scale	EEfRT task

Cognitive Systems, as of January 2022
Construct / Subconstruct		Genes	Molecules	Cells	Circuits	Physiology	Behavior	Self-reports	Paradigms
Attention		n/a	Implementation; GABA; Glutamate; Control; ACh; Dopamine; Glutamate; Histamine; Serotonin	Parvalbumin-positive interneurons	Balance between TPN vs DMN; Implementation; local circuit interactions; pulvinar; TRN; Control; Amg; Ascending / descending information pathways; Attentional systems; Basal forebrain limbic system; Dorsal network; Ventral network	fMRI; Sensory areas from peripheral to central; Auditory ERP; N1; N2; Neural oscillations; P1; P300; Processing negativity; Visual ERP; N2pc; Negativity (SN); Neural oscillations; P300; Selection modulations of sensory ERP components; Slow waves; Peripheral physiology; Heart rate deceleration; Pupil dilation	ANT task distractibility; Attentional lapses vs sustained attention; Distractibility; Object/feature attention; Psychophysics; Spatial attention		Attentional blink and psychological refractory period paradigm; Blocked channel-selection tasks; Dichotic listening; distraction paradigms (capture); Dual-task paradigms; inter-modal selective attention; spatial and non-spatial cuing paradigms; time-series of response times to extract variability and frequency domain analyses; visual search
Perception	Visual	n/a	ACH; Catecholamines; GABA; Glutamate; NMDA; Peptides; Serotonin	Magnocellular (non-linear gain control); Parvalbumin-positive interneurons; Parvo; Pyramidal cells	Subcortical; Koniocellular; Magnocellular; Parvocellular; Cortical; Cortico-cortical connections into supra- and infra-granular layers; Dorsal/ventral streams; Non-retinogeniculate; SC; SCN; Local circuitry; Lateral interactions; Top-down interactions; Implicated in contextual and association fields (responsible for the influence of spatial context on target processing)	Adaptation/habituation; BOLD activation of cortical regions; ERP components; Ncl; Oscillations (scalp EEG, LFP, and single/multi-unit recording); ssVEP; transient VEP	Discrimination, identification and localization; Perceptual learning; Perceptual priming; Reading; Stimulus detection; Visual acuity	Perceptual anomalies of schizophrenia and depression	Scheme 1: Stages of Vision; Early Vision; Local computations; Retinotopic representations; Intermediate Vision; Nonlocal properties of images; Transformations beyond retinotopic representations; Late Vision; Representations of external objects; Scheme 2: Commonly Used Research Paradigms; Backward masking; Biological motion processing; Bistability; Coherent motion; Contour integration/interpolation; Contrast sensitivity; Cross modality paradigms; Emotion expression identification; Face identification; Figure ground; Lateral facilitation; Multistability; Object perception; Object recognition/perceptual closure/perceptual organization; Parallel/serial search; Reading; Vernier discrimination; Visual illusion susceptibility; Other Schemes; Action-Perception loops; Re-entrant processing
Perception	Auditory	n/a	Acetylcholine; GABA; Glutamate; NMDA; Serotonin	Cochlear hair cells; Cortical and limbic inhibitory interneurons; Ribbon synapses	Nodes in Circuit; A1; Anterior insula; Brainstem; Cochlea; Inferior colliculus; MGN; STG; Circuits; Corticofugal; Dorsal/ventral streams	Adaptation/ habituation; Auditory steady-state response (ASSR); fMRI; Intracortical EEG; Metabolic changes; Mismatch negativity (MMN); N1; Neural oscillations; P3a; P50; startle and PPI	Perceptual identification; Perceptual learning; Perceptual priming; Spatial localization; Stimulus detection	Auditory hallucinations; Hyperacusis	Action-Perception loops; Auditory masking; auditory scene perception (e.g., streaming); Bistability; Categorization; Cross-modal interactions; Detection of speech in noise; Deviance detection; Gating; inhibitory control; Manipulation of ISI and/or intensity; McGurk (multisensory); novelty/oddball detection; Object perception; Regularity and change detection; same-different tasks; self-monitoring; tone detection (e.g., JND tasks); Tone matching
Perception	Olfactory / Somatosensory / Multimodal	n/a	n/a	n/a	n/a	n/a	n/a	n/a	Manipulation of ISI and/or intensity; Smell identification
Declarative Memory		n/a	Cholinergic; Glutamatergic; Noradrenergic; Opioid	Glia; Granule cells; Inhibitory and excitatory interneurons; Pyramidal cells	Extrinsic hippocampal circuitry; Intrinsic hippocampal circuitry; PFC and PPC interactions with multiple association cortices	AMPA-related synaptic plasticity; conjunction codes; frontal/temporal coordinated oscillations; LTP/LTD; NMDA-related synaptic plasticity; place cell activity; subsequent memory effect (fMRI, ERP); up/down states	Discrimination; Familiarity; Learning; Recall; Recognition	Cognitive Assessment Interview	acquired equivalence; delayed recall; list and story learning; Paired associate learning; transitive inference
Language		n/a	n/a	n/a	Inferior frontal cortex; Inferior Parietal Cortex; Inferior temporal cortex; Lateral superior and middle temporal cortices; Overlap with memory, motor, sensory, and emotional circuits	anterior negativities; N400; P600/late positivities	Coherent discourse; Coherent sentences; Production and comprehension of words	Cognitive Assessment Interview	Language Production; Linguistic corpus-based analyses of language output; Naming; Language Comprehension; Ability to answer questions about the content of sentences and discourse; Ability to distinguish between coherent and incoherent sentences and discourse; Detection and classification of semantic relationships between words; Listening and reading times to critical words and regions in linguistic input; Patterns of eye movements (in eye tracking paradigms) or motor movements (in mouse tracking paradigms) to critical words and regions in linguistic input; Patterns of eye movements to non-verbal visual stimuli during spoken language comprehension (the visual world paradigm); Experimental Manipulations; Manipulations of different types of coherence and cohesion between clauses in discourse; Manipulations of different types of relationships between individual words in priming paradigms; Manipulations of predictability and acceptability, at different levels of representation, in a linguistic input; Manipulations of relationships between language and non-verbal behaviors
Cognitive Control	1 of 2: Goal Selection; Updating, Representation, and Maintenance	n/a	n/a	n/a	Frontopolar/Anterior LPFC (BA10); Inhibition of DMN	n/a	n/a	BRIEF (Gioa)	Badre tasks; Koechlin paradigm; Task switching
Cognitive Control	2 of 2: Goal Selection; Updating, Representation, and Maintenance	n/a	ACH; Dopamine; GABA; Glutamate; Norepinephrine	PV; Pyramidal cells	Dorsolateral Prefrontal Cortex; Posterior Parietal Cortex; Thalamocortical	Gamma synchrony; Pupilometry	Distractibility; Off-task behaviors	BRIEF (Gioa); Cognitive Failures Questionnaire; SANS/SAPS/PANSS	AX paradigms; Cued stimulus-response reversal tasks; Task switching; Tower tasks
Cognitive Control	1 of 2: Response Selection; Inhibition / Suppression	n/a	ACH; Dopamine; GABA; Glutamate; Norepinephrine	PV; Pyramidal cells	Dorsolateral Prefrontal Cortex; Posterior Parietal Cortex; VLPFC	Gamma; Theta	Impulsive behaviors	BRIEF (Gioa); SANS/SAPS/PANSS	Flanker; Simon; Stroop
Cognitive Control	2 of 2: Response Selection; Inhibition / Suppression	n/a	Acetylcholine; Dopamine; GABA; Glutamate; Norepinephrine	Pyramidal cells	BA6/8 (FEF); Posterior Parietal Cortex; Pre-Supplementary Motor Area; Ventrofronto-striatal	Alpha; Pupilometry; Short interval cortical inhibition (TMS)	Distractibility; Impulsive behaviors; Off-task behaviors	ADHD Rating Scale (Dupaul); ATQ/CBQ Effortful Control; BRIEF (Gioa); Conners impulsivity scale	Antisaccade; Conflicting and contralateral motor response task; Countermanding; Go/Nogo; Motor persistence paradigms (e.g. NEPSY statue task); Stimulus-Resp Incompat; Stop-Signal Reaction Time
Cognitive Control	Performance Monitoring	n/a	Dopamine; Serotonin	n/a	ACC / pre-SMA Insula	ERN; N2; N450	Post-error or post-conflict adjustments in performance	YBOCS total score	Flanker; Simon; Stroop
Working Memory	Active Maintenance	n/a	D1; Dopamine; GABA; Glutamate; NMDA	Distinct types of inhibitory neurons; Pyramidal cells	Inferior Parietal Cortex; PFC-parietal-cingulate-dorsal thalamus-dorsal striatum; VLPFC	Delta; Gamma waves; Theta waves	n/a	n/a	AX-CPT/DPX; Change detection tasks; Complex Span tasks; delayed match to non sample; delayed match to sample; keep track task; Letter memory/running memory; Letter Number Sequencing; N-back; Self-Ordered Pointing; sequence encoding and reproduction; Simple Span Tasks; Sternberg Item Recognition
Working Memory	Flexible Updating	n/a	D2; Dopamine; GABA; Glutamate	Medium Spiny Neurons (basal ganglia)	dorsal striatum; Dorsolateral Prefrontal Cortex; MD; PFC-parietal-cingulate-dorsal thalamus-dorsal striatum; VA thalamus	Delta; Gamma waves; Theta waves	n/a	n/a	AX-CPT/DPX; Complex Span tasks; keep track task; Letter memory/running memory; Letter Number Sequencing; N-back; Self-Ordered Pointing; Sternberg Item Recognition
Working Memory	Limited Capacity	n/a	D1; D2; Dopamine; GABA; Glutamate	n/a	Dorsal Parietal; Dorsolateral Prefrontal Cortex; Inferior Parietal Cortex; MDPFC-parietal-cingulate-dorsal thalamus-dorsal striatum; VA thalamus; VLPFC	Delta; Gamma waves; Theta waves	n/a	n/a	AX-CPT/DPX; Change detection tasks; Complex Span tasks; delayed match to non sample; delayed match to sample; keep track task; Letter memory/running memory; Letter Number Sequencing; N-back; Self-Ordered Pointing; sequence encoding and reproduction; Simple Span Tasks; Sternberg Item Recognition
Working Memory	Interference Control	n/a	D1; D2; Dopamine; GABA; Glutamate	Calbindin; Calretinin; Distinct types of inhibitory neurons; Parvalbumin	DLPFC; PFC-parietal-cingulate-dorsal Th-dorsal striatum	Neural waves; Delta; Gamma; Theta	n/a	n/a	Complex Span tasks; Delayed match to non-sample; Delayed match to sample; Keep track task; Letter memory/running memory; Letter number sequencing; n-back; Self-Ordered Pointing; Simple Span Tasks; Sternberg Item Recognition

Social Processes, as of January 2022
Construct / Subconstruct		Genes	Molecules	Cells	Circuits	Physiology	Behavior	Self-reports	Paradigms
Affiliation and Attachment		n/a	3CRF; CRFR2; D1; Dopamine; KOR; Mu opioid receptor; Oxytocin; oxytocin receptor; Vasopressin; vasopressin 1a receptor	Magnocellular OT	Amygdala; BNST; FF gyrus; NAcc; OFC; PVN; VMPFC; VTA- NAcc- VP-amygdala	activation of sympathetic activity; HPA axis activation; HPA down-regulation; Immune markers; immune responses (“sickness”); Sex steroid changes; Vagal tone; vagal withdrawal	Attachment Formation; Maintaining proximity; Preference for individual; Attachment Maintenance; Distress upon separation	Adult Attachment Interview; Attachment Questionnaire for Children Scale; Attachment Style interview; Bartholomew and Shaver; Bereavement scales; Experience in Close Relationships Scale; Inventory of Parent and Peer Attachment Scale; Multidimensional Scale of Perceived Social Support; Parental Bonding Instrument; QSORT Parent Attachment interview; Social Anhedonia scale; Social subscales of depression	Cyberball; One-armed Bandit Task
Social Communication	Reception of Facial Communication	n/a	Dopamine; FMRP; GABA; Oxytocin; Serotonin; Testosterone; Vasopressin	Face selective neurons; Mirror neurons	amygdala-brainstem; IFG-INS-amygdala/VS; OFC-ACC-amygdala-striatum; Resting state networks; V1-FFA-STS-amygdala; V1-FFA-STS-VS	ECoG frontal brain asymmetry; Facial EMG; HR/BP/respiration; Local cerebral blood flow changes; N170; N250; Network dynamics; Pupil dilation; SCR; Startle reflex	Behavioral observation/coding systems; Eye gaze detection; Identification of emotion; Implicit mimicry; Scanning patterns	Arousal ratings; Face dimensional rating scales	Gaze Cuing; Penn Emotion Recognition (ER-40)
Social Communication	Production of Facial Communication	n/a	AP; Contactin	n/a	Eye Movements; PPC-SC-SNc-SEF-FEF-CB; Facial Expression; Regions including PAG, AC	Facial EMG; HR variability; NIRS; Photoplethysmography (skin color measure of capillary dilation; temperature); Pupil dilation; SC; Tear production	Behavioral observation/coding system; sEye gaze aversion/contact; Facial affect production; Head turning; Imitation of facial gestures; Joint attention; Reciprocal emotional expression; Reciprocal eye contact	Berkeley Expressivity Questionnaire	n/a
Social Communication	Reception of Non-Facial Communication	n/a	Oxytocin; Vasopressin	n/a	A1-RSTG; MPFC; Superior Temporal Sulcus; VLPFC	EEG features e.g., evoked gamma; Local cerebral blood flow changes; Network dynamics	Comprehension of emotional prosody; Comprehension of non-verbal gestures; Humor comprehension; Irony/sarcasm comprehension; Metaphor comprehension	Social Responsiveness Scale	Multimodal Social Paradigms
Social Communication	Production of Non-Facial Communication	n/a	n/a	n/a	R-IFG-RSTG; Songbird circuits	n/a	Crying/laughing; Gestural/postural expressions; Interactive play; Response to distress/separation distress; Speech (affective) prosody; Vocalizations	Social Responsiveness Scale	Multimodal Social Paradigms
Perception and Understanding of Self	Agency	n/a	n/a	n/a	Right insula-right inferior frontal; Right parietal; SMA-somatosensory-premotor	Scalp Motor Potentials	Delusions of control; Evidence that one understands ownership of one’s own body parts or action (thoughts/behaviors); Hallucinations; Stereotypic behaviors	Perceptual Aberration Scale	n/a
Perception and Understanding of Self	Self-Knowledge	n/a	n/a	Von Economo neurons	left inferior frontal cortex; MPFC; posterior cingulate/precuneus; ventral anterior cingulate (valence specific)	P300s to self-relevant stimuli	Developmentally appropriate perception of one’s competences, skills, abilities beliefs, intentions, desires, and/or emotional states	Levels of Emotional Awareness; Private Self-Consciousness; Self Components of Attributional Styles Questionnaire; Self-monitoring scale; Toronto Alexithymia scale	Self-Referential Memory Paradigm
Perception and Understanding of Others	Animacy Perception	n/a	n/a	n/a	extrastriate body area; fusiform face area; occipital face area; Superior Temporal Sulcus	MU Suppression	Ability to appropriately attribute animacy to other agents	n/a	Point Light Displays of Biological Motion
Perception and Understanding of Others	Action Perception	n/a	n/a	Mirror neurons	Inferior Parietal Cortex; Superior Temporal Sulcus; ventral/dorsal premotor	cortico-spinal facilitation (TMS); MU Suppression	Ability to identify what actions an agent is executing; Gaze following; Imitation; Mimicry	Balanced Emotional Empathy Scale; Empathy Quotient; Perspective Taking and Empathic Concern subscales of the Interpersonal Reactivity Index	How/Why Task
Perception and Understanding of Others	Understanding Mental States	n/a	Oxytocin; Vasopressin	n/a	MPFC; precuneus; Superior Temporal Sulcus; temporal pole; TPJ	n/a	Developmentally appropriate interpretations of other intentions, goals and beliefs	Balanced Emotional Empathy Scale; Empathy Quotient; Other components of Attributional Styles Questionnaires; Perspective Taking and Empathic Concern subscales of the Interpersonal Reactivity Index	Hinting Task; Reading the Mind in the Eyes

Arousal and Regulatory Systems, as of January 2022
Construct	Genes	Molecules	Cells	Circuits	Physiology	Behavior	Self-reports	Paradigms
Arousal	n/a	ACh; CRF; Cytokine; Dopamine; GABA; Ghrelin; Glutamate; Histamine; OX; Leptin; NPY; NE/NA; Opioid; Oxt; Serotonin; ADH	Basal forebrain nuclei; aCeN; Dorsal raphe; Hy; LH; perifornical; dorsomedial; LDT; LC; PPT; TMN; Ventral tegmental area	Basal nuclei to cortical circuits; Cholinergic & monoaminergic nuclei / projections; aCeN to monoaminergic and basal forebrain cholinergic nuclei; brainstem projections to basal forebrain; nuclei projections to Th and cortical; projections to midbrain and Pn; reciprocoal projection; Circadian & sleep-related circuits modulate and are modulated by arousal; Cortical circuits; fronto-insular; area 32; Hy to thalamic and cortical circuits; Reciprocal Hy; Reciprocal NTS-aCeN	EEG; EMG; ERP; fMRI; Neural activity; Sex-specific differences in arousal; Autonomic; BP; Breathing; EDA; Heart rate; Pupil size; HPA axis; ACTH; CRF; Glucocorticoid	Affective state; Agitation; Cognition; Emotional reactivity; Blinking; Motivated behavior; Motor activity; Sensory reactivity; Startle; Waking	ADACL; POMS arousal subscale; Self-assessment mannequin	Cardiac pre-ejection period; EDA; HRV; Psychomotor vigilance task; Pupillometry
Circadian Rhythms	n/a	Serotonin; Input; Dopamine; GABA; Glutamate; Melanopsin; NPY; PACAP; SP; SCN synchronizing & modulating agents; ADH; Calbindin; cAMP; cGMP; NO; Steroids; VIP; Output; ADH; Cortisol; GABA; Melatonin; VIP	Fibroblast; ipRGC; Medium spiny neuron; Pars tuberalis cells; Pinealocyte; Rods and cones; SCN "clock" cells	Input; Raphe to SCN projection; retinal cell; RHT; retinogeniculate tract; Output; BL / Hi; central extended Amg (aCeN/BNST); HPA axis; neuroendocrine cell groups; Hy OX projections; PVN, DMH, subparaventricular zone, PVT; SCN / PVN / SCG / pineal; SNS / PNS; Intrinsic to SCN; SCN core/shell; Seasonal; SCN / PVN / SCG / pineal	Gene expression; Neural activity; Neurotransmitter	Drive-regulated behavior; Locomotor activity; Masking; Neurobehavioral function; Sleep-rated and waking behavior; Sleep-wake	Diary-based measures of daily regularity/rhythmicity (e.g., Social Rhythm Metric); Morningness–eveningness questionnaire; Munich Chronotype Questionnaire; Phase, diurnal preference, chronotype (e.g., Horne-Ostberg, CTQ); Sleepiness, alertness, well-being, mood	DLMO (phase estimate); Longitudinal Actigraphy; Genetic approaches; genome-wide association study; candidate gene; epigenomics; circadian genomics (temporal gene expression); mutagenesis; gene targeting; quantitative trait locus
Sleep-Wakefulness	n/a	ACh; Adenosine; CRF; Cytokine; Dopamine; GABA; Galanin; Glutamate; Histamine; OX; NE/NA; NPY; Serotonin; ADH	AH and basal forebrain; Brainstem; LC; Raphe; LDT/PPT; VTA; HACER Hy; PHR (TMN); Th; MD; Rt	NREM sleep; forebrain; basal forebrain and AH projections to arousal-promoting cell groups; thalamocortical tract; REM sleep; brainstem; mesopontine nuclei; Wakefulness; Arousal and Circadian Rhythms circuits also subserve wakefulness	Brain metabolic activity; Capacity for wakefulness under low stimulation; EEG; sleep spindle; slow wave; theta wave; EMG; EOG; NREM sleep and REM sleep; Physiologic measures of sleepiness, homeostatic sleep drive during waking; Sex-specific sleep physiology; Sleep hormones; Sleep latency; Temporal and topographic organization of...; homeostatic sleep drive during sleep; sleep dynamics; Wakefulness	Intermediate/admixed sleep-wake states; Rest-activity patterns; Sensory arousal threshold; Sleep; co-sleeping; deprivation and satiation; inertia; motor behaviors; sex-specific behavior; timing and variability; Sleep-dependent neurobehavioral functions; Wakefulness	Alertness; Dream report; Fatigue; Insomnia severity index; Sleep quality, restoration, quantity; Sleep timing; Sleep-modulated symptoms; Sleepiness; Specific sleep symptoms	Finger tapping motor sequence task; Latency to persistent sleep; Multiple sleep latency testing; Non-REM sleep EEG slow wave activity; Sleep spindle; Total sleep time; Wake time after sleep onset

Sensorimotor Systems, as of January 2022
Construct / Subconstruct		Genes	Molecules	Cells	Circuits	Physiology	Behavior	Self-reports	Paradigms
Motor Action	Action Planning and Selection	n/a	n/a	n/a	Parietal cortex; inferior; posterior; Premotor cortex; STS; SMA proper	n/a	Apraxia; conceptual; ideational; ideomotor; limb-kinetic	n/a	Go-before-you-know
Motor Action	Sensorimotor Dynamics	n/a	n/a	Granule cells; Purkinje cells	BG; Cerebello-olivary-pontine complex; Cerebellum; Parietal cortex; Somatosensory cortex; Substantia nigra; Th	Short afferent inhibition	Dyspraxia; Hyposensitivity; Weakness	n/a	Sensory Motor Adaptation Tasks
Motor Action	Initiation	n/a	n/a	n/a	BG; Dorsal cingulate; SMA proper	n/a	Apathy; Catatonic stupor; Negative symptoms; Psychomotor retardation; Stuttering	Lille Apathy Rating Scale	Libet's Temporal Judgement
Motor Action	Execution	n/a	n/a	Alpha motor neurons; Betz cells; Pyramidal cells	Efferent and afferent spinal and peripheral pathways; Motor cortex	Bereitschaftspotential; Corticospinal tract excitability; Hoffmann's reflex; Movement-related cortical potentials; Use-dependent plasticity	Activity level; Ehlers–Danlos syndromes; Psychomotor retardation	n/a	Motor evoked potential latency
Motor Action	Inhibition and Termination	n/a	Dopamine; GABA; NE/NA	Intracortical inhibitory interneurons; Striatal interneurons	ACC; BG; Cerebellum; DLPFC; FEF; IFG; IPL; Lateral premotor cortex; Mid-CgG; PCC; SMA proper; Pre-SMA; SPL	Cortical inhibition; Oscillatory rhythms; Prepulse inhibition	Activity level; Automatic obedience; Catatonia; immobility; rituals; negativism; Perseveration; Stereotypy; Tics; Utilization behavior	n/a	Stop-signal reaction time
Agency and Ownership		n/a	n/a	Mirror neuron	Cerebellum; Corpus callosum; IPL; Sensorimotor Th; S1; SMA proper; Pre-SMA	Efference copy; Readiness potential	Alien hand syndrome; Functional movement disorder; Neglect; Perception of external control; Stereotypy; Tic	n/a	n/a
Habit - Sensorimotor		n/a	Dopamine; GABA; Glutamate; Serotonin	n/a	PtA; Sensorimotor-BG	n/a	Compulsive behavior; Stereotypy	Rush video-based tic rating scale; Yale Global Tic Severity Scale	2-step task
Innate Motor Patterns		n/a	n/a	n/a	Brainstem; Hy; Motor cortex; Occulomotor system	Corneal reflex	Disinhibition of early motor reflexes; Incontinent affect; Startle; Stereotypy	n/a	n/a

The domains are tentative: "It is important to emphasize that these particular domains and constructs are simply starting points that are not definitive or set in concrete." Also, subconstructs have been added to some constructs. For example, Visual Perception, Auditory Perception, and Olfactory/Somatosensory/Multimodal perception as subconstructs of the Perception construct.

== Methodology ==
The RDoC methodology distinguishes itself from traditional systems of diagnostic criteria.

Unlike conventional diagnostic systems (e.g. DSM) which use categorization, RDoC is a "dimensional system" — it relies on dimensions that "span the range from normal to abnormal."

Whereas conventional diagnostic systems incrementally revise and build upon their pre-existing paradigms, "RDoC is agnostic about current disorder categories." Official documents explain this feature, writing: "Rather than starting with an illness definition and seeking its neurobiological underpinnings, RDoC begins with current understandings of behavior-brain relationships and links them to clinical phenomena."

Unlike conventional diagnostic systems, which typically rely on self-report and behavioral measures alone, the RDoC framework has the "explicit goal" of allowing investigators access to a wider range of data. In addition to self-report measures or measure of behavior, RDoC also incorporates units of analysis beyond those found in the DSM — allowing RDoC to be informed by insights into genes, molecules, cells, circuits, physiology, and large-scale paradigms. Early data driven approaches to RDoC based continuous transdiagnostic psychiatric phenotypes predict clinical prognosis across diagnosis and have genetic correlates that in not only clinical populations.
