= Fear processing in the brain =

Description of psychological research

Many experiments have been done to find out how the brain interprets stimuli and how animals develop fear responses. The emotion, fear, has been hard-wired into almost every individual, due to its vital role in the survival of the individual. Researchers have found that fear is established unconsciously and that the amygdala is involved with fear conditioning.

By understanding how fear is developed within individuals, it may be possible to treat human mental disorders such as anxiety, phobia, and post-traumatic stress disorder.

== Neuronal fear pathways ==
In fear conditioning, the main circuits that are involved are the sensory areas that process the conditioned and unconditioned stimuli, certain regions of the amygdala that undergo plasticity (or long-term potentiation) during learning, and the regions that bear an effect on the expression of specific conditioned responses. These pathways converge in the lateral amygdala. Long-term potentiation (LTP) and synaptic plasticity that enhances the response of lateral amygdala neurons to the conditioned stimulus occurs in the lateral amygdala. As a result, the conditioned stimulus is then able to flow from the lateral amygdala to the central nucleus of the amygdala. The basal and intercalated masses of the amygdala connect the lateral amygdala with the central nucleus of the amygdala directly and indirectly. Pathways from central nucleus of the amygdala to downstream areas then control defensive behavior (freezing) and autonomic and endocrine responses. Recent studies implicate the prelimbic cortex in fear expression as well, possibly by way of its connections to the basal and then to the central nucleus of the amygdala.

== Behavioral basis ==
It has been observed that fear can contribute to behavioral changes. One way this phenomenon has been studied is on the basis of the repeated stress model done by Camp RM et al.(among others). In this particular study, it was examined that the contribution fear conditioning may play a huge role in altering an animal's (Fischer rat's) behavior in a repeated stress paradigm. Behavioral changes that are commonly referred to as depressive-like behaviors resulted from this model of testing. After setting a control and a valid experimental design, Fischer rats were exposed daily to different stressors in a complex environment. After four days of stressor exposure, both exploratory behavior and social interaction were tested on day 5 in either the same environment or a new environment. The rats showed much decreased exploration and social interaction when tested in different contexts compared to control rats. To further make a correlation to the biochemistry (as mentioned below), chronic infusion of propranolol (beta-adrenergic receptor antagonist) prevented the behavioral changes following repeated stressor exposure thus halting long term potentiation. Some physiological changes also occurred including the decrease in body weight gain and adrenal hypertrophy observed in animals exposed to stress. Overall, the conditioned fear responses can contribute to behavioral changes in a repeated stress paradigm. This can be extended to correlate to other animals as well but with varying degrees of responses.

== Molecular basis ==
Molecular mechanisms that have been linked directly to the behavioral expression of conditioning are easier to study in a clinical setting as opposed to mechanisms that underlie long-term potentiation (LTP), in which synaptic plasticity is induced by electrical or chemical stimulation of lateral amygdala circuits. LTP is important for fear processing because it strengthens the synapses in neural circuits. These strengthened synapses are how long-term memory is developed and how fear is developed.

=== Hebbian synaptic plasticity ===
Synaptic input can be strengthened when activity in the presynaptic neuron co-occurs with depolarization in the postsynaptic neuron. This is known as Hebbian synaptic plasticity. This hypothesis is especially appealing as an explanation for how simple associative learning, such as that taking place in fear conditioning, might occur. In this model of fear conditioning, strong depolarization of the lateral amygdala elicited by the stimulus leads to the strengthening of temporally and spatially relative conditioned stimulus inputs (that are coactive) onto the same neurons. Experimental data has been shown to support the idea that the plasticity and fear memory formation in the lateral amygdala are triggered by unconditioned stimulus-induced activation of the region's neurons. Thus, unconditioned stimulus-evoked depolarization is necessary for the enhancement of conditioned stimulus-elicited neural responses in this region after conditioned-unconditioned pairing and pairing a conditioned stimulus with direct depolarization of the lateral amygdala's pyramidal neurons as an unconditioned stimulus supports fear conditioning. It is also clear that synaptic plasticity at conditioned stimulus input pathways to the lateral amygdala does occur with fear conditioning.

==== NMDA-type ionotropic glutamate receptors ====
Hebian plasticity is believed to involve N-methyl-d-aspartate receptors (NMDARs) and are located on postsynaptic neurons in the lateral amygdala. NMDARs are known to be coincidence detectors of presynaptic activity and postsynaptic depolarization. Auditory inputs are NMDARs in the lateral amygdala and use glutamate as a transmitter. Furthermore, it was tested that when the region's neurons that received auditory inputs also received unconditioned stimulus inputs and broad spectrum NMDAR antagonists in the lateral amygdala resulted in the disruption of the acquisition of fear learning. Therefore, these receptors are crucial to the metabolic pathway of processing and eliciting for the percept of fear.

==== Monoamine neuromodulatory-dependent mechanisms ====
It is believed that monoamine transmitters such as norepinephrine and dopamine that are released in emotional situations function in regulating glutamatergic transmission and Hebbian plasticity. The modulation of all of the different types of plasticity is called heterosynaptic plasticity. Homosynaptic plasticity is also prevalent which consists solely of the Hebbian plasticity. In a variety of model systems, it has been shown that monoamines modulate plasticity underlying memory formation such as a heightened percept of fear. Neuromodulators also contribute to fear conditioning. The Hebbian mechanisms contribute to plasticity in the lateral amygdala and fear learning. Other modulators apart from the Hebbian mechanisms include serotonin, acetylcholine, endocannabinoids, and various peptides (such as gastrin-releasing peptide, NPY, opiates, and oxytocin) but the role of these compounds are not fully understood.

==== Norepinephrine ====
Norepinephrine is a huge player in fear memory formation. Recent studies have demonstrated that the blockade of norepinephrine β-adrenergic receptors (β-ARs) in the lateral nucleus of the amygdala interferes with the acquisition of fear learning when given pretraining stimuli but has no effect when applied posttraining or before memory retrieval. In contrast to effects of β-AR receptor blockade on other forms of learning, this effect is specific to only acquisition, as opposed to the posttraining processing or expression of fear memory. The activation of β-ARs in the lateral amygdala synergistically regulates Hebbian processes to trigger the neuron's associative plasticity and fear learning in the lateral nucleus of the amygdala. One theory suggests that the mechanism of β-AR involvement in the acquisition of fear learning is that they act on GABAergic interneurons to suppress feed-forward inhibition and enhance Hebbian plasticity. β-ARs are found on GABAergic interneurons as well as in the lateral amygdala's pyramidal cells. The process of activation of β-ARs start off by coupling to G protein signaling cascades, which then activate protein kinase A (PKA). This activation can elicits the phosphorylation of NMDARs as well as the ser845 site on GluA1, which could facilitate AMPAR insertion at the synapse.

==== Dopamine ====
Dopamine receptor activation (both D1 and D2 receptor subtypes) in the amygdala contributes to the acquisition of fear conditioning. D1 and D2 receptors are G protein coupled and inhibit adenylate cyclase (Gi-coupled) and stimulate adenylate cyclase (Gs-coupled), respectively. Just like β-ARs, dopamine receptors may modulate Hebbian processes directly by reducing feed-forward inhibition. They may also act in a parallel fashion with Hebbian mechanisms to implement synapses in the lateral amygdala and promote plasticity and fear learning through their respective signaling pathways. Accumulating evidence suggests that midbrain dopaminergic innervation of the basolateral amygdala facilitate the formation of fear memories.

==== Metabotropic glutamate receptor-mediated neuromodulation during ====
Plasticity and learning can also be modulated by metabotropic glutamate receptors (mGluRs). The proteins mGluRs likely serve a modulatory function and do not participate directly in Hebbian processes. This is because due to the fact these receptors do not contribute to depolarization during synapses. They are also not activated by receptors that participate in Hebbian processes. Finally, they do not detect pre- and postsynaptic neural activity. However, the activation of group I mGluRs in the lateral amygdala and basal nucleus enhances the acquisition, reduction, and amplification of fear conditioning by providing an influx of calcium ions.

== Fear circuitry ==
=== Fear recognition ===
Research studies have shown that damage to the bilateral amygdala affects mostly the recognition of fear. In a specific study conducted by Andrew J. Calder and Andrew W. Young, they had subjects classify morphed images of facial expressions ranging from happiness to surprise to fear to sadness to disgust to anger. While control subjects classified these images to the nearest expression, subjects who had damage to the bilateral amygdala had problems with this task, especially with the recognition of facial expressions that show fear. The subjects with the damaged bilateral amygdala had no problems differentiating happiness from sadness, but they could not differentiate the expression of anger from fear.

However, in an experiment conducted by Ralph Adolphs, it elucidated the mechanism of the impaired fear recognition. Adolphs found that his main subject, who had a rare bilateral amygdala damage, could not discern fear expressions because of her inability to look at the eye region of the face. When the subject was instructed to look directly at the eye region of faces with expression, the subject could recognize fear expressions of faces. Although the amygdala does play an important part in the recognition of fear, further research shows that there are alternate pathways that are capable to support fear learning in the absence of a functional amygdala. A study by Kazama also shows that although the amygdala may be damaged, it is still possible for patients to distinguish the difference between safety cues and fear.

=== Conditioned stimuli ===
There has been a substantial amount of research done on conditioned stimuli, where a neutral stimulus, such as a flash of light, is paired with a shock is given to a rat. The result of this conditioned stimulus is to provoke the unconditioned response, fear. The once neutral stimulus is given again to see if the rat would show the responses of fear. However, because fear responses involve many behaviors, it is important to see which behaviors are exhibited when the conditioned stimulus is given.

=== Visual and auditory stimuli ===
Initially, the visual stimuli is first received by the visual thalamus and relayed to the amygdala for potential danger. The visual thalamus also relays the information to the visual cortex and is processed to see if the stimuli poses a potential threat. If so, this information is relayed to the amygdala and the muscle contraction, increased heart rate and blood pressure begins, thus activating the sympathetic neuronal pathway. A presentation of a neutral visual stimuli has been shown to intensify the percept of fear or suspense induced by a different channel of information, such as audition. From Le Doux's research, it shows that sound stimuli are not directly relayed from the auditory thalamus to the central nucleus.

== Perception ==
The perception of fear is elicited by many different stimuli and involves the process described above in biochemical terms. Neural correlates of the interaction between language and visual information has been studied by Roel Willems et al. The study consisted of observing how visual and linguistic information interact in the perception of emotion. A common phenomenon from film theory was borrowed which states that the presentation of a neutral visual scene intensifies the percept of fear or suspense induced by a different channel of information, such as language. This principle has been applied in a way in which the percept of fear was present and amplified in the presence of a neutral visual stimuli. The main idea is that the visual stimuli intensify the fearful content of the stimuli (i.e. language) by subtly implying and concretizing what is described in the context (i.e. sentence). Activation levels in the right anterior temporal pole were selectively increased and is believed to serve as a binding function of emotional information across domains such as visual and linguistic information.

Exposure to different types of emotion and levels of arousal also appear to influence pain through an interaction known as the valence-by-arousal interaction. During this reaction, negative emotions experienced by an individual with low levels of arousal tend to cause enhanced pain while negative valenced emotions with higher levels of arousal have been observed to decrease the perception of pain. Low levels of arousal would include reactive emotions such as anxiety while higher levels of arousal include emotions such as fear.
