= LEDS =

LEDS may refer to:

- LEDs, light-emitting diodes
- Low-Emission Development Strategies and Plans, an advanced climate-resilient low emission development strategy
- Life Events and Difficulties Schedule, a psychological measurement of the stressfulness of life events created by psychologists George Brown and Tirril Harris in 1978
- National Law Enforcement Data Service (frequently shortened to NLEDS or LEDS), a replacement for the Police National Computer under development for United Kingdom law enforcement authorities and partners

== See also ==
- Leeds, a city in West Yorkshire, England
- Elebits, a video game known as "Eledees" (LEDs) in Europe
