= Extended amygdala =

The extended amygdala is a macrostructure in the brain that is involved in reward cognition and defined by connectivity and neurochemical staining. It includes the central medial amygdala, sublenticular substantia innominata, and the bed nucleus of the stria terminalis. The boundaries are indistinct in Nissl stained sections.

== Anatomy ==
The extended amygdala has central and medial divisions. The central division includes the central nucleus of the amygdala and lateral subdivisions of the BNST. The medial division includes the medial nucleus of the amygdala and medial subdivisions of the BNST.

The central nucleus and lateral BNST are connected by two major fiber bundles, the stria terminalis and the ventral amygdalofugal pathway. A further connection runs through the sublenticular extended amygdala, a group of neurons within the substantia innominata. Both the central nucleus and the BNST send projections to the hypothalamus and brainstem, which help coordinate physiological and behavioral responses to threat.

In human brain sections that show only neuronal cell bodies, the continuity of the extended amygdala beneath the globus pallidus is difficult to trace. Stains that reveal peptide-containing nerve fibers make this connection more apparent. Some anatomical descriptions also include a transition zone in the shell of the nucleus accumbens.

== Function ==
Early models associated the central nucleus chiefly with brief responses to immediate threats and the BNST with more sustained responses. Human imaging studies have found activity in both regions during brief threats and during prolonged exposure to situations in which a threat is uncertain.

Studies in rodents have implicated circuits of the central extended amygdala in feeding and reward seeking. In rodents, the medial nucleus of the amygdala processes signals from the accessory olfactory bulb and relays information to the BNST and hypothalamus. Studies have linked the medial nucleus to behaviors such as mating, aggression, and predator avoidance.

The extended amygdala is part of the brain's stress circuitry associated with distress and negative emotional states during drug withdrawal. In animal studies, levels of corticotropin-releasing factor in the extended amygdala rise during acute withdrawal. Blocking its receptors reduces anxiety-like responses in these models.

== History ==
The concept grew out of observations by J. B. Johnston in 1923 on the relationship between the amygdala and the BNST. Lennart Heimer, José de Olmos, George Alheid, and their colleagues later developed the concept through studies of the anatomy and connections of these structures.
