= Infralimbic cortex =

Brain region of tonic inhibition of fear

Details

Identifiers
- Latin: Cortex infralimbicus

The infralimbic cortex (IL) is a cortical region in the ventromedial prefrontal cortex which is important in tonic inhibition of subcortical structures and emotional responses, such as fear.

== Connectivity ==
=== Primates ===
GABAergic neurons within the amygdala, known as intercalated (ITC) cells, receive a strong projection from the IL medial prefrontal cortex (mPFC) in primates. ITC cells are thought to play a role as the 'off switch' for the amygdala, inhibiting the amygdala's central nucleus output neurons and its basolateral nucleus neurons. Further, it has been shown that electrical stimulation of IL reduces conditioned fear and strengthens extinction memory, explaining cortical control over extinction processes, one of the simplest forms of emotional regulation.

=== Rodents ===
Amygdala ITC cells receive strong projection from the IL mPFC in rodents as well.

== See also ==
- Medial prefrontal cortex
- Intercalated cells of the amygdala
