= Accessory olfactory cortical areas =

Human amygdala portion

Accessory olfactory cortical areas are portions of the human amygdala that are homologous to those areas in other species that receive afferents from the accessory olfactory bulb. They include the caudal part of the medial amygdalar nucleus, and the cortical amygdalar nucleus.
