= Lennart Heimer =

Lennart Heimer (11 March 1930 – 12 March 2007), was a Swedish-American neuroscientist and professor at the Massachusetts Institute of Technology and the University of Virginia. He was most noted for mapping circuits of the brain in the limbic lobe and basal ganglia, structures that play central roles in emotion processing and movement.

== Background ==
Heimer was born in Östersund, Sweden. He completed his medical training at the University of Gothenburg. In 1965, Heimer was recruited to join the faculty at the MIT Department of Psychology and Brain Science.

== Research ==
Heimer's first notable achievement was the development of the Fink-Heimer silver stain for mapping the smallest ends of axons in the brain. With this and other tract-tracing techniques, he made his most well known contribution: a new structural framework for the striatum. Heimer identified the nucleus accumbens and the olfactory tubercle as striatal structures and termed them the "ventral striatum." The traditional striatal structures, the caudate nucleus and putamen are, strictly speaking, now termed the 'dorsal' striatum, though in practice the term "striatum" without qualification generally refers just to the dorsal striatum. Heimer is also known for helping to elaborate the anatomical concept of the extended amygdala, first proposed by his collaborator, Jose de Olmos.
