= Amygdalotomy =

Surgical removal of the amygdala

Amygdalotomy, also known as amygdalectomy, is a form of psychosurgery which involves the surgical removal or destruction of the amygdala, or parts of the amygdala. It is usually a last-resort treatment for severe aggressive behavioral disorders and similar behaviors including hyperexcitability, violent outbursts, and self-mutilation.

The practice of medical amygdalotomy typically involves the administration of general anesthesia and is achieved through the application of cranial stereotactic surgery to target regions of the amygdala for surgical destruction. While some studies have found stereotactic amygdalotomy in humans to be an effective treatment for severe cases of intractable aggressive behavior that has not responded to standard treatment methods, other studies remain inconclusive.

In most cases of amygdalotomy in humans, there is no substantial evidence of impairment in overall cognitive function, including intelligence and working memory, however, deficits in specific areas of memory have been noted pertaining to the recognition and emotional interpretation of facial stimuli. This is because there are specialized cells in the amygdala which attend to facial stimuli.

== Background ==
The amygdala is considered to be an important underlying structure in the fight-or-flight response, playing a mediating role in aggression in both humans and animals. Clinical studies have revealed that the stimulation of the amygdala produces or accentuates rageful behavior in animals. Research has also revealed that lesions of the amygdala in both humans and animals produces a calming effect on aggressive behavior. Based on these findings, amygdalotomy was developed as a neurosurgical procedure to ameliorate aggression by reducing arousal levels in the amygdala.

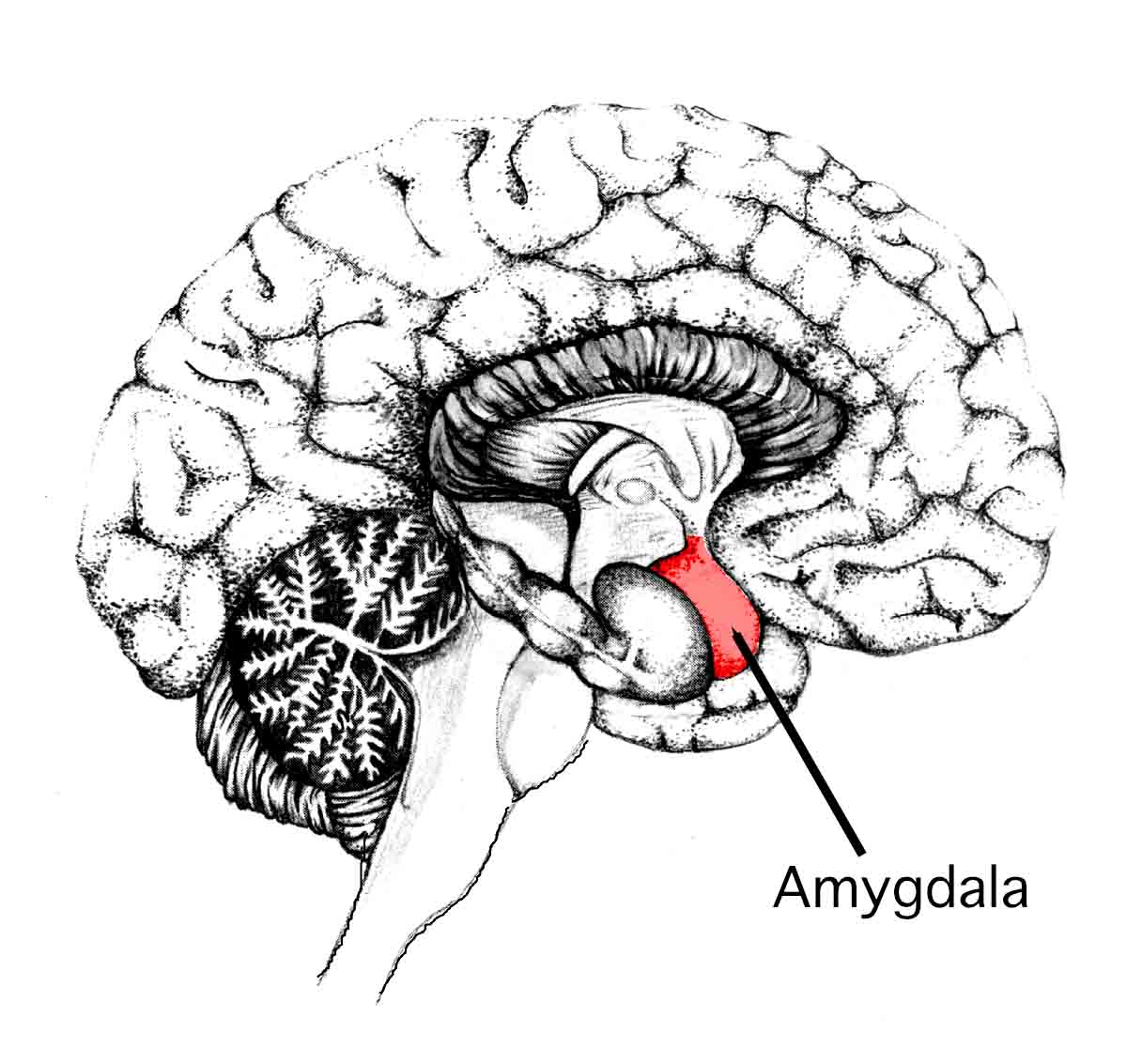
The location of the amygdala in the human brain

== Medical use ==
Since the early 1900s there has been an accumulation of experimental evidence to demonstrate the role of the limbic system, specifically the amygdala complex in mediating emotional expressions of fear and anger. Early primate studies have revealed that chemical and electrical stimulation of the amygdala region accentuates aggressive behavior. Conversely, destruction of the amygdala nucleus results in a taming effect of normal anger and fearing responses in primate behavior. Similarly, clinical studies in humans have revealed the close etiological role of temporal lobe structures, particularly the limbic system and the amygdala in mediating fear and rageful behavior. These findings have been instrumental in the development of clinical amygdalotomy as a form of neurosurgery to produce placating effects on abnormal aggressive behaviors. Procedural amygdalotomy is used as a last recourse treatment for severe intractable aggression when other options including pharmacological treatments have been exhausted. The psychopathology of patients with severe aggressive behavior in clinical cases of amygdalotomy over the past 20th century vary, including epileptics with violent convulsions, psychotics with violent outbursts, individuals with unmanageable conduct disorder, and patients with self-mutilative tendencies. The clinical practice of amygdalotomy in humans is commonly implemented under the stereotactic frame, with varying techniques used to destroy the amygdala, ranging from radiofrequency, mechanical destruction and the injection of oil, wax, and alcohol. The preferred target zone of the amygdala also varies from basal and lateral nuclei, to the medial region, the cortico-medial group of nuclei and the bed of the stria terminalis. The size of the lesion differs from one-third to one-half, to three-quarters, to the entire amygdalar region. In spite of these methodological differences, most published accounts of human amygdalotomy have indicated beneficial outcomes in reducing the intensity and frequency of aggressive behaviors.

== Historical evolution ==
=== Animal studies ===
Amongst some of the earliest studies conducted on the removal of the amygdala were animal and primate studies. In the early 1890s, Friedrich Goltz conducted experiments on temporal lobectomy in dogs including the removal of the amygdala and found that dogs post-surgery experienced a taming effects on aggressive behaviors. Deep brain stimulation studies in animals revealed that the temporal lobe is involved in mediating expressions of rage and aggression. A more detailed analysis of specific regions of the temporal lobe in animals revealed that the limbic system, specifically the amygdala complex, is involved in mediating fear and aggression. Some of the earliest primate studies on amygdalotomy were carried out on rhesus monkeys by Kluver and Bucy in the late 1930s. Data collected from these studies revealed that bilateral destruction of the amygdala resulted in a reduction in the intensity and frequency of fear and aggression behaviors.

=== Clinical trials ===
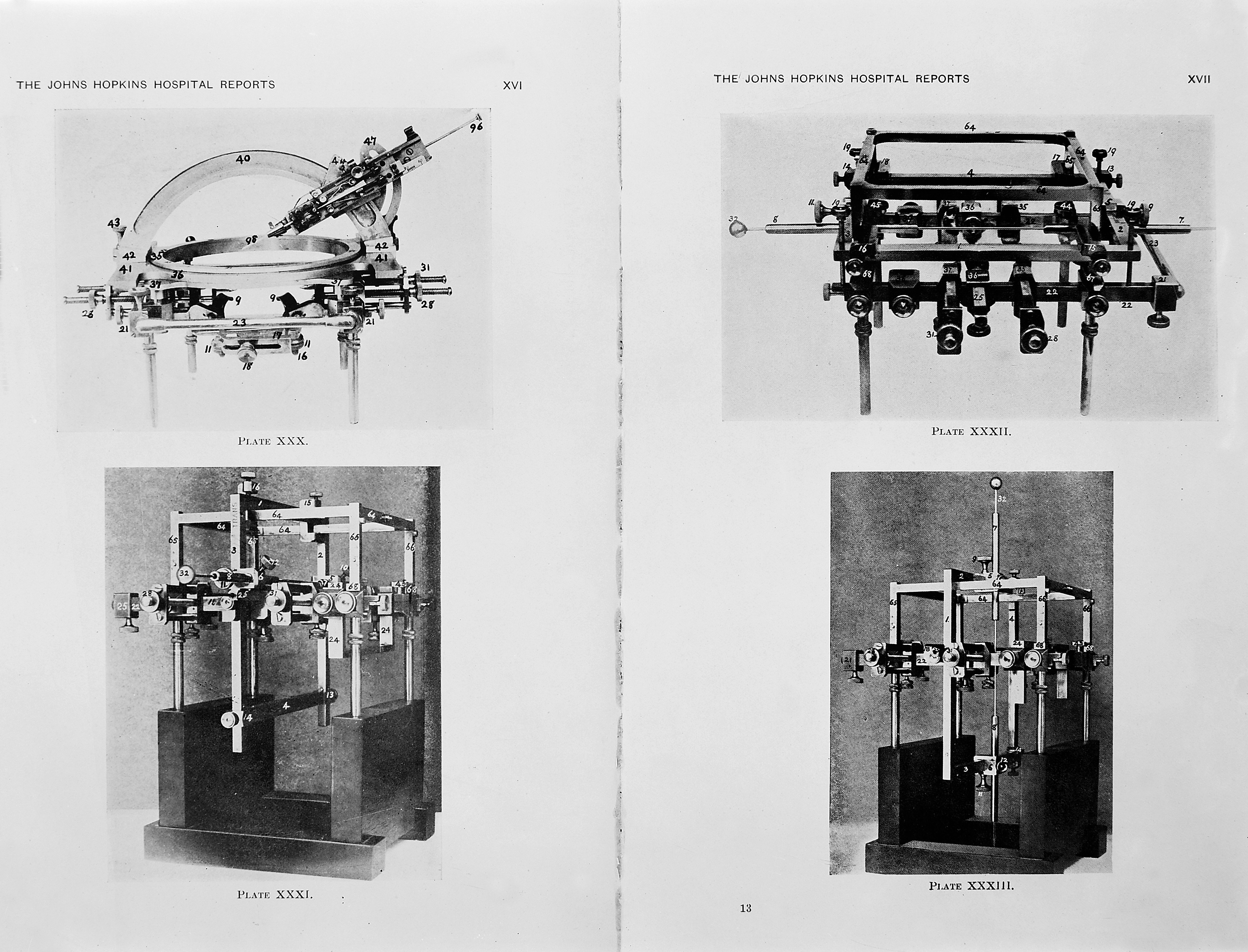
The stereotaxic apparatus used for clinical amygdalotomy

The human counterpart of the role of the amygdala was then observed in the 20th century at the height of psychosurgery. Professor Hirotaro Narabayashi and his colleagues were the first researchers to carry out stereotactic amygdalotomy for the treatment of abnormal aggression and hyperexcitability in a series of 60 patients with psychological disturbances. The procedure was performed under a stereotactic frame devised by Professor Narabayashi and involved the administration 0.6-0.8ml mixture of oil-wax to destroy the lateral groups of the amygdala nucleus, localized via pneumoencephalography. The clinical results revealed a marked reduction in emotional disturbances amongst 85% of the cases. Following Narabayashi's study, there have been over 1000 cases of amygdalotomy reported in clinical trials as a last-resort treatment for severe intractable aggressive disorders. Around the same time, Hatai Chitanondh utilized a slightly different technique of stereotactic amygdalotomy using an injection of an olive oil mixture to induce lesions to mechanically block signals in the amygdala. The results revealed an improvement in social adaptability of all seven patients. In the late 1960s and 1970s, Balasubramaniam and Ramamurthi investigated the largest clinical patient series to undergo stereotactic amygdalotomy for aggression behaviours. The procedure was performed via high-frequency current generating electrodes inserted stereotactically to induce several small thermal lesions, creating a total lesion volume of 1800mm, a size that is larger than the amygdala. The improvement in maladaptive behavior in patients, including hyperexcitability, rebellious behavior, and destructive behavior, ranged from moderate to high. The development of MRI technology in the recent 20th century has enabled a more accurate and efficient process of amygdalotomy, with easier localization of amygdala regions during neuro-navigation as well as the use of advanced radiofrequency generating electrode to induce surgical lesions. Despite these recent advances in technology, there has been a decline in clinical cases of amygdalotomy for treatment of maladaptive behavior, with growing skepticism in the medical community of the cost-benefits of the procedure and partly due to a greater reliance on pharmacological treatments

== Clinical effectiveness ==
=== Short-term results ===
There has been a general consensus amongst many researchers on the general effectiveness of amygdalotomy in reducing aggression amongst patients with psychosis, violent epilepsy, and self-mutilative behavior. A diverse study on stereotactic amygdalotomy used to treat 25 patients primarily for aggressive behavior and violent epilepsy, found that behavioral abnormalities were eliminated in 2 of the 20 patients, with a significant improvement in another 9 of the 20 patients with aggressive behavior manifests. Convulsions were also eliminated in 4 of the 21 patients, whilst 12 of the patients experienced a significant decrease in the number of epileptic convulsions. Patient rehabilitation was also effective with 2 of the 12 patients committed to mental institutions being discharged, whilst 5 of 8 patients awaiting institutionalization were no longer being considered. A multi-disciplinary project carried out on amygdalotomy amongst epileptics with violent outbursts found that amygdalotomy showed promising results, with a decline in violent, aggressive and anti-social behavior as well as a reduction amongst patients and an improvement in the occupational functioning of some of the patients. The researchers, however, concluded that the results cannot be generalized to non-epileptics. Other studies conducted on patients with conduct disorder, personality disorder, self-mutilation, and schizophrenics with violent hallucinations found that these maladaptive behaviors also improved across these groups of patients. Using reliable and objective methods of evaluation, Heimburger and colleagues found that in patients who did not respond to non-surgical therapy, amygdalotomy was effective, with both conditions of uncontrolled conduct disorder and seizures seeming improved after surgery. Stereotaxic amygdalotomy conducted on 12 patients with schizophrenia and frequent self-mutilations found that, in 11 of the 12 patients, amygdalotomy resulted in elimination and or marked reduction of aggressive episodes. In two of patients with frequent self-mutilative episodes and reactive psychotic hallucinations, however, these symptoms disappeared only after an additional basofrontal tractotomy had been performed.

=== Long-term results ===
There is a scarcity of long-term studies on the follow-up effects of clinical amygdalotomy in humans. Amongst the few follow-up studies, includes a research study which compared the results of clinical amygdalotomy in 58 patients pre and post-surgery over an average of 6 years using objective analysis such as psychiatric interviews, neuropsychological tests and EEG analysis and found no indication of worsening of symptoms. Additionally, the researchers found some evidence for the retention of positive outcomes in one-third of the patients, which were not limited to improvements in rageful behaviour but also included a decrease in the overall frequency of seizures. Another follow-up study by Professor Narabayashi and colleagues observed the clinical effects of amygdalotomy in 40 cases from 3 to 5 years and found 27 of the cases had continued a satisfactory improvement in calming and taming effects on what was previously uncontrollable aggression including destructive and violent behaviour.

== Risks and side-effects ==
In most cases of amygdalotomy in humans, there is no substantial evidence of impairment in overall cognitive function, including intelligence and working memory. However, deficits in specific areas of memory have been noted, particularly areas of memory pertaining to the recognition and emotional interpretation of facial stimuli. These findings of face recognition impairment after amygdalotomy are of particular importance due to the neurophysiological data collected on the importance of cells in the amygdala that specifically attend to facial stimuli in both humans and primates. A detailed case study of a patient who had undergone a bilateral amygdalotomy found incidences where the patient showed poor learning of new faces and impaired recognition of familiar faces, particularly troubles with naming faces. Additionally the patient also revealed further deficits in the emotional processing of facial stimuli, demonstrating difficulty in identifying and matching a range of facial expressions. Another study of 15 patients showed no reduction in general intelligence, but there was a similar pattern of changes in attention and memory involving facial stimuli. This link between the amygdala and social disturbances pertaining to the processing of facial stimuli has been investigated as a possible side-effect of amygdalotomy in some patients
