= S.M. (patient) =

Brain-damaged "woman with no fear"

- Other names: Patient S.M.; SM-046
- Known for: Having bilateral amygdala destruction due to Urbach–Wiethe disease and having no psychological fear

S.M., sometimes referred to as SM-046, is an American woman with a peculiar type of brain damage that physiologically reduces her ability to feel fear. First described by scientists in 1994, she has had exclusive and complete bilateral amygdala destruction since late childhood as a consequence of Urbach–Wiethe disease. Dubbed by the media as the "woman with no fear", S.M. has been studied extensively in scientific research; she has helped researchers elucidate the function of the amygdala. According to neuroscientist Jack van Honk in 2026, S.M. "has to be the world's most famous living neurological patient".

== Characteristics ==
An experiment with S.M. revealed no fear in response to exposure and handling of snakes and spiders (including tarantulas), a walk through a haunted attraction (Waverly Hills Sanatorium, specifically), or fear-inducing film clips (e.g., The Blair Witch Project, The Shining, and The Silence of the Lambs), eliciting instead only interest, curiosity, and excitement, though she expressed emotions appropriate to the film content such as happiness and disgust when viewing non-fear-inducing film clips. Research has revealed that S.M. is not immune to all fear, however; along with other patients with bilateral amygdala damage, she was found to experience fear and panic attacks of greater intensity than the neurologically healthy controls in response to simulation of the subjective experience of suffocation via carbon dioxide inhalation, feelings which she and the others described as completely novel to them.

=== Positive emotions ===
S.M. is described as very outgoing, extremely friendly, and uninhibited, as well as "somewhat coquettish" (playfully flirtatious) and having an abnormally high desire and tendency to approach others. She is greatly impaired in recognizing negative social cues, such as being incapable of recognizing fear in the facial expressions of other people and having difficulty judging trustworthiness and approachability in the faces of others. These traits are consistent with the fact that she tends to quite indiscriminately approach and engage in physical contact with others. In addition, S.M. appears to experience relatively little negative emotion, whilst simultaneously experiencing a relatively high degree of positive affect, despite great adversity in her life. Accordingly, she tends to be very positive about most people, situations, and issues.

=== Music ===
S.M. exhibits impairments in the emotional processing of music; specifically, she shows selectively impaired recognition of sad and scary music.

=== Danger appraisal ===
In addition to her lack of fear, S.M. shows a lack of a sense of personal space, and experiences virtually no discomfort standing extremely close to strangers, even nose-to-nose with direct eye contact. She does understand the concept of personal space, however, and acknowledges that sometimes, other people need more personal space than she does.

S.M. has been the victim of numerous acts of crime and traumatic and life-threatening encounters. She has been held up at both knifepoint and gunpoint, was almost killed in a domestic violence incident, and has received explicit death threats on multiple occasions. Despite the life-threatening nature of many of these situations, S.M. did not exhibit any signs of desperation, urgency, or other behavioral responses that would normally accompany such incidents. The disproportionate number of traumatic events in S.M.'s life has been attributed to a combination of her living in a dangerous area filled with poverty, crime, and to a marked impairment on her part of detecting looming threats in her environment and learning to steer clear of potentially dangerous situations. S.M. herself has never been convicted of a crime.

=== Memory differences ===
S.M. shows memory differences. Emotionally arousing stimuli are known to undergo an enhancement of consolidation into long-term declarative memory (see emotion and memory), and this effect appears to be dependent on the amygdala. In accordance, S.M. displays impaired declarative memory facilitation for emotional material, while her memory consolidation for neutral material is normal.

=== Empathy ===
S.M. is still capable of being empathetic to others despite being less capable of detecting negative emotion from faces; however, her threshold for noticing another person's pain was described as "fairly high".

== Personal life ==
S.M. is white and was born in 1965. She has been married and is a mother of three boys. S.M. has had a history of adversity in her life, including alienation, hardship, teasing, shunning and abuse from authority figures.

== See also ==
- Amygdalotomy
- Jo Cameron
- Henry Molaison
- Klüver–Bucy syndrome
- Williams syndrome
