= Amygdalofugal pathway =

Efferent pathway of the amygdala

The amygdalofugal pathway (Latin for "fleeing from the amygdala" and commonly distinguished as the ventral amygdalofugal pathway) is one of the three major efferent pathways of the amygdala, meaning that it is one of the three principal pathways by which fibers leave the amygdala. It leads from the basolateral nucleus and central nucleus of the amygdala. The amygdala is a limbic structure in the medial temporal lobe of the brain. The other main efferent pathways from the amygdala are the stria terminalis and anterior commissure.

While the stria terminalis carries information primarily from the corticomedial nuclei of the amygdala, the ventral amygdalofugal pathway carries output from the central and basolateral nuclei and delivers it to a number of targets; namely, the medial dorsal nucleus of the thalamus, the hypothalamus, the basal forebrain, the brainstem, septal nuclei and nucleus accumbens. Both the amygdalofugal pathway and the stria terminalis project to the septal region, the hypothalamus, and the thalamus, but the stria terminalis reaches the septal region and the hypothalamus in a much longer and less direct path. While the stria terminalis follows a C-shaped pathway along the lateral ventricles, the ventral amygdalofugal pathway is more direct and contains a higher proportion of myelinated axons, causing the pathway to appear darker upon observation in stained cross-section.

The amygdalofugal pathway and the stria terminalis together “ enable the corticomedial amygdala to directly control the medial hypothalamus and enable the basolateral amygdala to directly control the lateral hypothalamus and PAG,” or midbrain periaqueductal gray. Through the bed nucleus of the stria terminalis, the amygdala additionally modulates the hypothalamus and PAG indirectly.

This pathway is particularly important for associative learning.

== Amygdala ==
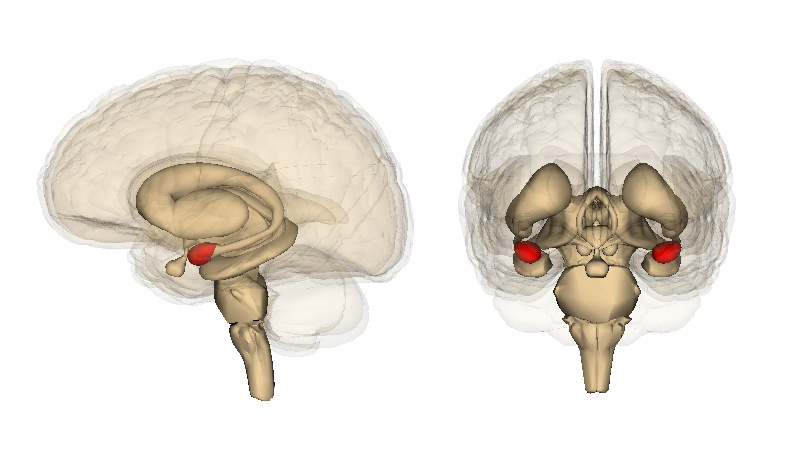
Amygdala

=== Basolateral nucleus ===
The basolateral nucleus is by far the largest part of the amygdala. The fibers leading from it to the central nucleus “provide a key link between the experience of emotions and their expression.”

The basolateral nucleus includes five parts: the posterolateral part, the ventromedial part, the intermediate part, the dorsal part, and the ventrolateral part.

Inputs to the basolateral nucleus include visual, auditory, and somatosensory information. The basolateral nucleus is in close communication with the cerebral cortex, and in terms of function, the basolateral nucleus is more like the cerebral cortex than is the central nucleus. The basolateral nucleus differs from the cortex in that it is not layered, but it includes pyramidal neurons, is continuous with the parahippocampal cortex, and has extensive connections with the other parts of the cortex. Its strongest direct connections to the cerebral cortex are with the insular cortex, the orbital cortex, and the medial wall of the frontal lobe. These connections allow the basolateral nucleus to receive and modulate sensory and polysensory processing. The neurotransmitter in each of these connections is either glutamate or aspartate. Both the neocortex and the basolateral nucleus receive diffuse cholinergic (acetylcholine) projections from the nucleus basalis of Meynert.

Stimulation of the basolateral nucleus causes a reduction in feeding, and stimulation of the basolateral nuclear group causes an increase in arousal and attention. The components of the basolateral nuclear group include the basolateral nucleus, lateral nucleus, and the basomedial nucleus.

The basolateral nucleus cooperates with the central nucleus in persistent fear responses. It influences regions of the brainstem through the central nucleus via the amygdalofugal pathway and the stria terminalis. In mice, the basolateral nucleus mediates anxiety.

Oxytocin has been visualized in the basolateral nuclei. In one study, prescription opioid patients were found to have decreased anisotropy in the amygdalofugal pathway.

=== Central nucleus ===
The central nucleus can be thought of as the exit of the amygdaloid bodies through which the bodily responses that are associated with fear leave the amygdala. It is the most peptide-rich region of the brain.

The amygdalofugal pathway connects the central nucleus of the amygdala to the brainstem. The stria terminalis does so also but in a longer, less direct route. These connections collectively are involved with emotional responses. The brainstem regions that the central nucleus connects to are responsible for controlling “expression of innate behaviors and associated physiological responses.” The central nucleus also has three subnuclei: lateral, capsular, and medial. It is the medial subnucleus that forms connections with “response control regions.” Most of the projection neurons in the central nucleus are inhibitory.

The nucleus basalis also connects the central nucleus of the amygdala to the cortex through cholinergic projections that “are thought to arouse the cortex.”

Lesion experiments show that the central nucleus of the amygdala connects with the startle circuit via the caudal part of the amygdalofugal pathway. This is the part of the pathway that projects directly to the parts of the pons, medulla, and perhaps the spinal cord.

Conscious perception of emotion involves output from the central nucleus of the amygdala as well as its connections through the amygdalofugal pathway to the anterior cingulate cortex, orbitofrontal cortex, and prefrontal cortex.

== Other major components ==
=== Nucleus accumbens ===
The connections of the amygdalofugal pathway to the nucleus accumbens plays a role in the perception of a stimulus as either gratifying or aversive.

The nucleus accumbens, along with other regions of the ventral striatum and the prefrontal cortex, is one of the major targets of ascending dopaminergic pathways originating from the ventral tegmental area.

=== Thalamus ===
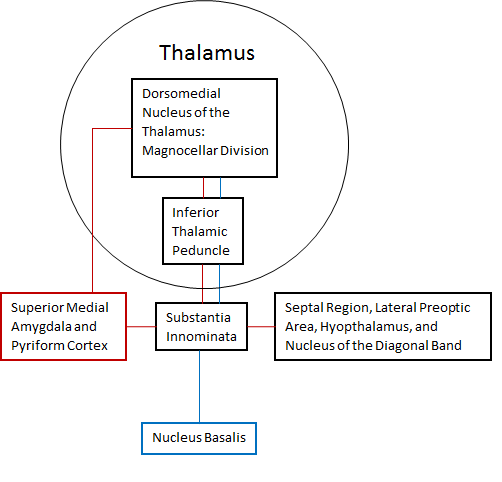
Amygdala and Nucleus Basalis connections to the Thalamus

The amygdala connects to the thalamus both through the amygdalofugal pathway and through a direct connection to the dorsomedial nucleus of the thalamus. After leaving the substantia innominata, the ventral amygdalofugal pathway continues on a medial path to enter the septal region, the lateral preoptic area, the hypothalamus, and the nucleus of the diagonal band. The fibers which bypass the preoptic area and the hypothalamus travel more superiorly and enter the inferior thalamic peduncle. From there, the amygdalofugal fibers travel just laterally to the mammillothalamic tract in the ventral anterior nucleus as they enter the dorsal medial nucleus.

Amygdalofugal fibers as well as fibers from the nucleus basalis both project to the substantia innominata followed by the thalamic peduncle and then the magnocellar division of the dorsal medial nucleus. The dorsal medial nucleus therefore receives indirect input from both the amygdala and the nucleus basalis. Lesions to the dorsal medial nucleus cause amnesic syndromes, but they need to interrupt both the mammillothalamic tract and the amygdalofugal pathway in order to do so. Thus, both pathways play a role in memory.

=== Pyriform cortex ===
The pyriform cortex is a type of allocortex that corresponds to the rostral half of the uncus. Its strongest afferent connections are from the olfactory bulb. Although the olfactory cortex comprises all the “areas in the rostro-ventral portion of the forebrain which receive direct projections from the olfactory bulb,” including the anterior olfactory nucleus, olfactory tubercle, the pyriform cortex, the entorhinal cortex, the insular cortex, and the amygdala, the pyriform cortex is considered synonymous with the olfactory cortex because it is “by far the largest cortical area primarily involved in perception and learning of olfactory stimuli.” It is a type of paleocortex, which means that it is older than and has fewer layers than neocortex but is more recent than and contains more layers than archicortex. Along with the parahippocampal gyrus, the pyriform cortex is a chief component of paleocortex.

The pyriform cortex is located in the anterior medial temporal lobe. Through the amygdalofugal pathway, it projects to the nucleus of the diagonal band. The pyriform cortex is adjoined to the basolateral nucleus of the amygdala. The pyriform cortex and the basolateral nucleus are considered to be the main starting points of the amygdalofugal pathway. The connection from the basolateral nucleus that goes deep to the pyriform cortex is also considered part of the amygdalofugal pathway.

=== Anterior cingulate cortex ===
One reason that the amygdalofugal pathway is important is because it links motivations to responses. The anterior cingulate cortex in particular is involved with using emotions to make decisions. It has been implicated in a wide variety of cognitive functions as well as transient mood changes, depression and anxiety disorders, and the perception of pain.

=== Hypothalamus ===
The stria terminalis, not the amygdalofugal pathway, is the main connection between the amygdala and the hypothalamus. The amygdalofugal connection, however, is shorter and more direct.

The hypothalamus is a highly important structure that is involved with the regulation of bodily functions. These include endocrine, autonomic, and behavioral functions. It produces a wide variety of hormones. These control body temperature, hunger, moods, sex drive, sleep, thirst, and release of other hormones. There are dozens of peptides within the hypothalamus that have been discovered in recent years. The hypothalamus also influences daily physiologic cycles and plays a role in regulating emotional responses. Many of these functions can be described as homeostatic. It is the most ventral part of the diencephalon and contains three regions: the supraoptic region, the tuberal region, and the mammillary region.
