= Intercalated cells of the amygdala =

The Intercalated cells of the amygdala (ITC or ICCs) are GABAergic neurons situated between the basolateral and central nuclei of the amygdala that play a significant role in inhibitory control over the amygdala. They regulate amygdala-dependent emotional processing like fear memory and social behavior. Their function has been best studied with selective ITC ablation which impairs fear extinction, fear generalization, and social behavior. Studies have begun to recognize that ITC clusters may be implicated in reward, addiction, and withdrawal circuits given their heavy expression of dopamine and opioid receptors.

In rodents, ITCs are organized into distinct clusters that wrap the basolateral amygdala (BLA). Each cluster is unique in connectivity, intrinsic properties, and function. These clusters are named by their location relative to the BLA with medial ITC clusters towards the central amygdala.

== Function ==
ITC cells are thought to play a role as the "off" switch for the amygdala, inhibiting the amygdala's central nucleus output neurons and its basolateral nucleus neurons. The ITC clusters work together to activate either "fear promoting" or "fear extinction" pathways within the amygdala. Some researchers speculate that ITC cells could serve as a substrate for the expression and storage of extinction memory via their extensive local inhibition within the amygdala.

== Connectivity ==
ITCs have complex connections from both thalamic and cortical nuclei. In the rodent model, each ITC cluster has its own connection and projection patterns. Furthermore, ITC neurons within each cluster are often connected to each other and distinct clusters appear to be connected to each other

The best clusters studied to date are the ITCdm and ITCvm clusters which are reciprocally connected to each other. These clusters work collaborately to activate populations of neurons within the basal amygdala (BA) that project to the medial prefrontal cortex (mPFC). The opposing action of these two clusters has been shown to modulate fear vs extinction states.

There is also some evidence that ITCs receive some inputs from the mPFC and was originally thought that the infralimbic prefrontal cortex directly innervates the ITCs. However, recent optogenetic studies have shown that in the rodent model, ITCs do not receive direct inputs from the IL prefrontal cortex.

== See also ==
- Amygdala
- Basolateral Amygdala
- Medial prefrontal cortex
