= Life Events and Difficulties Schedule =

- Purpose: measurement of the stressfulness of life events

The Life Events and Difficulties Schedule is a psychological measurement of the stressfulness of life events. It was created by psychologists George Brown and Tirril Harris in 1978. Instead of accumulating the stressfulness of different events, as was done in the Social Readjustment Rating Scale by Thomas Holmes and Richard Rahe, they looked at individual events in detail. The schedule is made up of an interview by which as much contextual information around the event as possible is collected. The event is then rated by "blind" raters using this contextual information.

Critics of this method note the fact that the impact of the independent variable, the event itself, is measured by evaluating it using mediating and moderating variables.

== Research ==
The Life Events and Difficulties Schedule proved a powerful instrument to predict changes in neuroticism.
