= Amygdala =

Paired structure within the brain temporal lobe

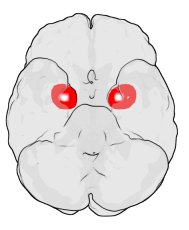
- Location of amygdalae in the human brain (view from below, anterior is at top)

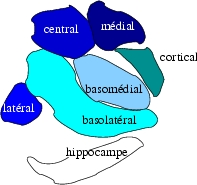
- Subdivisions of the amygdala

Details

Identifiers
- Latin: corpus amygdaloideum
- MeSH: D000679
- NeuroNames: 237
- NeuroLex ID: birnlex_1241
- TA98: A14.1.09.402
- TA2: 5549
- FMA: 61841

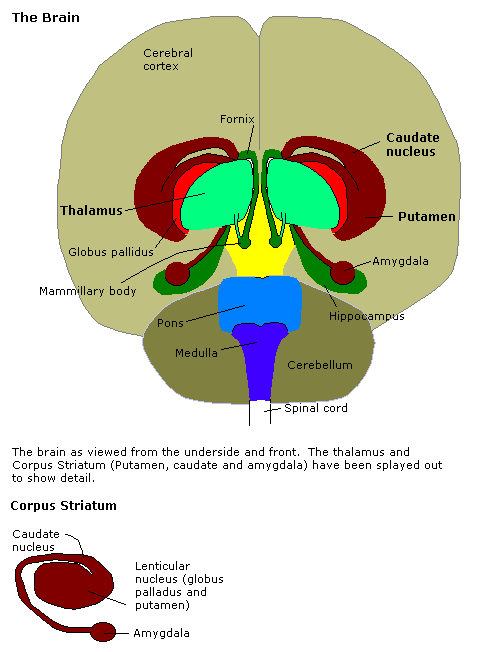
Human brain in the coronal orientation. Amygdalae are shown in dark red.

The amygdala (/əˈmɪɡdələ/; pl.: amygdalae /əˈmɪɡdəli, -laɪ/ or amygdalas; also corpus amygdaloideum) is a paired nuclear complex present in the cerebral hemispheres of vertebrates. It is considered part of the limbic system. In primates, it is located medially within the temporal lobes. It consists of many nuclei, each made up of further subnuclei. The subdivision most commonly made is into the basolateral, central, cortical, and medial nuclei together with the intercalated cell clusters. The amygdala has a primary role in the processing of memory, decision-making, and emotional responses (including fear, anxiety, and aggression). The amygdala was first identified and named by Karl Friedrich Burdach in 1822.

== Structure ==
Subdivisions of the mouse amygdala

T1 MRI images of amygdala in human (highlighted in green)

Coronal

Sagittal

Transversal

Thirteen nuclei have been identified as part of the amygdala, each with its own subdivisions and distinct connections to the rest of the brain. The chief nuclei are the basolateral complex, the central nucleus, the cortical nucleus, the medial nucleus, and the intercalated cell clusters. The cortical and medial nuclei connect with the olfactory system and hypothalamus. The central nucleus has extensive projections to the brainstem.

The basolateral complex can be further subdivided into the lateral, the basal, and the accessory basal nuclei. It has extensive connections with higher-order cortical areas in the prefrontal, temporal, insular cortices, and the hippocampus. The basolateral complex is surrounded by the intercalated cell net that is inhibitory and projects to a broad variety of areas in the basal forebrain, hypothalamus, and the amygdala.

The primate amygdala contains about 32 different types of neuron.

=== Hemispheric specializations ===
The right and left portions of the amygdala have independent memory systems, but work together to store, encode, and interpret emotion.

The right hemisphere of the amygdala is associated with negative emotion. It plays a role in the expression of fear and in the processing of fear-inducing stimuli. Fear conditioning, which occurs when a neutral stimulus acquires aversive properties, occurs within the right hemisphere. When an individual is presented with a conditioned, aversive stimulus, it is processed within the right amygdala, producing an unpleasant or fearful response. This emotional response conditions the individual to avoid fear-inducing stimuli and more importantly, to assess threats in the environment.

The right hemisphere is also linked to declarative memory, which consists of facts and information from previously experienced events and must be consciously recalled. It also plays a significant role in the retention of episodic memory. Episodic memory consists of the autobiographical aspects of memory, permitting recall of emotional and sensory experience of an event. This type of memory does not require conscious recall. The right amygdala plays a role in the association of time and places with emotional properties.

In one study, electrical stimulations of the right amygdala induced negative emotions, especially fear and sadness. In contrast, stimulation of the left amygdala was able to induce either pleasant (happiness) or unpleasant (fear, anxiety, sadness) emotions. Other evidence suggests that the left amygdala plays a role in the brain's reward system.

== Development and sex distinction ==
When controlling for total brain volume or intracranial volume, there is no significant difference in the average size of the amygdala between men and women. Raw amygdala volumes are, on average, 10.6% larger in men, but men also have larger bodies and brains on average.

There is considerable growth within the first few years of structural development in both male and female amygdalae. Within this early period, female limbic structures grow at a more rapid pace than the male ones. Amongst female subjects, the amygdala reaches its full growth potential approximately 1.5 years before the peak of male development. The structural development of the male amygdala occurs over a longer period than in women.

There are observable developmental differences between the right and left amygdala. The left amygdala reaches its developmental peak approximately 1.5–2 years prior to the right amygdala. Despite the early growth of the left amygdala, the right increases in volume for a longer period of time. The right amygdala is associated with response to fearful stimuli as well as face recognition. For the left amygdala, it is inferred that the early development of it functions to provide infants the ability to detect danger due to its reported responds predominantly to fearful events and faces. In childhood, the amygdala is found to react differently to same-sex versus opposite-sex individuals. This reactivity decreases until a person enters adolescence, where it increases dramatically at puberty.

Functional and structural differences have been discovered between male and female amygdalae. The results of PET scans showed a different lateralization of the amygdala in men and women after watching an emotional film. Enhanced memory for the film was related to enhanced activity of the left, but not the right, amygdala in women, whereas it was related to enhanced activity of the right, but not the left, amygdala in men. Studies involving patients with amygdala damage came to a similar conclusion. In patients with unilateral amygdala damage, men with right (but not left) amygdala damage were more likely to be impaired in decision-making ability, while women with left (but not right) amygdala damage were more likely to be impaired in decision-making ability. One study found evidence that, on average, women tend to retain stronger memories for emotional events than men.

== Function ==
=== Connections ===
Variability in amygdala connectivity has been related to a variety of behaviors and outcomes such as fear recognition and social network size. A simple view of the information processing through the amygdala follows as: the amygdala sends projections to the hypothalamus, septal nuclei and BNST (via the amygdalofugal tract), the dorsomedial thalamus (via the amygdalothalamic tract), the nuclei of the trigeminal nerve and the facial nerve, the ventral tegmental area, the locus coeruleus, and the laterodorsal tegmental nucleus.

The basolateral amygdala projects to the nucleus accumbens, including the medial shell. Glutamatergic neurons in the basolateral amygdala send projections to the nucleus accumbens shell and core. Activation of these projections drive motivational salience. The ability of these projections to drive incentive salience is dependent upon dopamine receptor D1. The endocannabinoid system that produces lipoid neuromodulators has its specific receptors (CB1) found in amygdalae.

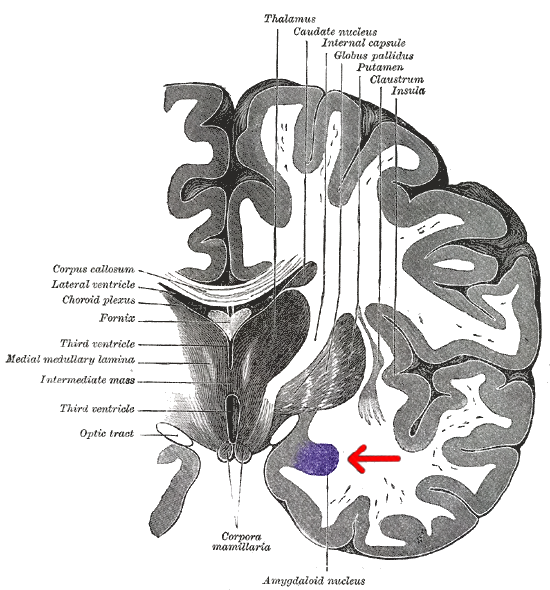
Coronal section of brain through intermediate mass of third ventricle. Amygdala is shown in purple.

The medial nucleus is involved in the sense of smell and pheromone-processing. It receives input from the olfactory bulb and olfactory cortex.The lateral amygdalae, which send impulses to the rest of the basolateral complexes and to the centromedial nuclei, receive input from the sensory systems. The centromedial nuclei are the main outputs for the basolateral complexes, and are involved in emotional arousal in rats and cats.

=== Emotional learning ===
In complex vertebrates, including humans, the amygdalae perform primary roles in the formation and storage of memories associated with emotional events. Research indicates that, during fear conditioning, sensory stimuli reach the basolateral complexes of the amygdalae, particularly the lateral nuclei, where they form associations with memories of the stimuli. The association between stimuli and the aversive events they predict may be mediated by long-term potentiation, a sustained enhancement of signaling between affected neurons. There have been studies that show that damage to the amygdala can interfere with memory that is strengthened by emotion. One study examined a patient with bilateral degeneration of the amygdala. He was told a violent story accompanied by matching pictures and was observed based on how much he could recall from the story. The patient had less recollection of the story than patients with functional amygdala, showing that the amygdala has a strong connection with emotional learning.

Emotional memories are thought to be stored in synapses throughout the brain. Fear memories, for example, are considered to be stored in the neuronal connections from the lateral nuclei to the central nucleus of the amygdalae and the bed nuclei of the stria terminalis (part of the extended amygdala). These connections are not the sole site of fear memories given that the nuclei of the amygdala receive and send information to other brain regions that are important for memory such as the hippocampus. Some sensory neurons project their axon terminals to the central nucleus. The central nuclei are involved in the genesis of many fear responses such as defensive behavior (freezing or escape responses), autonomic nervous system responses (changes in blood pressure and heart rate/tachycardia), neuroendocrine responses (stress-hormone release), etc. Damage to the amygdalae impairs both the acquisition and expression of Pavlovian fear conditioning, a form of classical conditioning of emotional responses. Accumulating evidence has suggested that multiple neuromodulators acting in the amygdala regulates the formation of emotional memories.

The amygdalae are also involved in appetitive (positive) conditioning. It seems that distinct neurons respond to positive and negative stimuli, but there is no clustering of these distinct neurons into clear anatomical nuclei. However, lesions of the central nucleus in the amygdala have been shown to reduce appetitive learning in rats. Lesions of the basolateral regions do not exhibit the same effect. Research like this indicates that different nuclei within the amygdala have different functions in appetitive conditioning. Nevertheless, researchers found an example of appetitive emotional learning showing an important role for the basolateral amygdala: The naïve female mice are innately attracted to non-volatile pheromones contained in male-soiled bedding, but not by the male-derived volatiles, become attractive if associated with non-volatile attractive pheromones, which act as unconditioned stimulus in a case of Pavlovian associative learning. In the vomeronasal, olfactory, and emotional systems, Fos (gene family) proteins show that non-volatile pheromones stimulate the vomeronasal system, whereas air-borne volatiles activate only the olfactory system. Thus, the acquired preference for male-derived volatiles reveals an olfactory-vomeronasal associative learning. Moreover, the reward system is differentially activated by the primary pheromones and secondarily attractive odorants. Exploring the primary attractive pheromone activates the basolateral amygdala and the shell of nucleus accumbens but neither the ventral tegmental area nor the orbitofrontal cortex. In contrast, exploring the secondarily attractive male-derived odorants involves activation of a circuit that includes the basolateral amygdala, prefrontal cortex, and ventral tegmental area. Therefore, the basolateral amygdala stands out as the key center for vomeronasal-olfactory associative learning.

=== Memory modulation ===
The amygdala is also involved in the modulation of memory consolidation. Following any learning event, the long-term memory for the event is not formed instantaneously. Rather, information regarding the event is slowly assimilated into long-term (potentially lifelong) storage over time, possibly via long-term potentiation. Recent studies suggest that the amygdala regulates memory consolidation in other brain regions. Also, fear conditioning, a type of memory that is impaired following amygdala damage, is mediated in part by long-term potentiation. During the consolidation period, the memory can be modulated. In particular, it appears that emotional arousal following the learning event influences the strength of the subsequent memory for that event. Greater emotional arousal following a learning event enhances a person's retention of that event. Experiments have shown that administration of stress hormones to mice immediately after they learn something enhances their retention when they are tested two days later.

The amygdala, especially the basolateral nuclei, are involved in mediating the effects of emotional arousal on the strength of the memory for the event, as shown by many laboratories including that of James McGaugh. These laboratories have trained animals on a variety of learning tasks and found that drugs injected into the amygdala after training affect the animals' subsequent retention of the task. These tasks include basic classical conditioning tasks such as inhibitory avoidance, where a rat learns to associate a mild footshock with a particular compartment of an apparatus, and more complex tasks such as spatial or cued water maze, where a rat learns to swim to a platform to escape the water. If a drug that activates the amygdalae is injected into the amygdalae, the animals had better memory for the training in the task.

Amygdala activity at the time of encoding information correlates with retention for that information. However, this correlation depends on the relative "emotionalness" of the information. More emotionally arousing information increases amygdalar activity, and that activity correlates with retention. Amygdala neurons show various types of oscillation during emotional arousal, such as theta activity and gamma activity. These synchronized neuronal events could promote synaptic plasticity (which is involved in memory retention) by increasing interactions between neocortical storage sites and temporal lobe structures involved in declarative memory.

In rats, DNA damage was found to increase in the amygdala immediately after exposure to stress. Stress was induced by 30 minutes of restraint or by forced swimming. By seven days after exposure to these stresses, increased DNA damage was no longer detectable in the amygdala, probably because of DNA repair.

Buddhist monks who do compassion meditation have been shown to modulate their amygdala, along with their temporoparietal junction and insula, during their practice. In an fMRI study, more intensive insula activity was found in expert meditators than in novices.

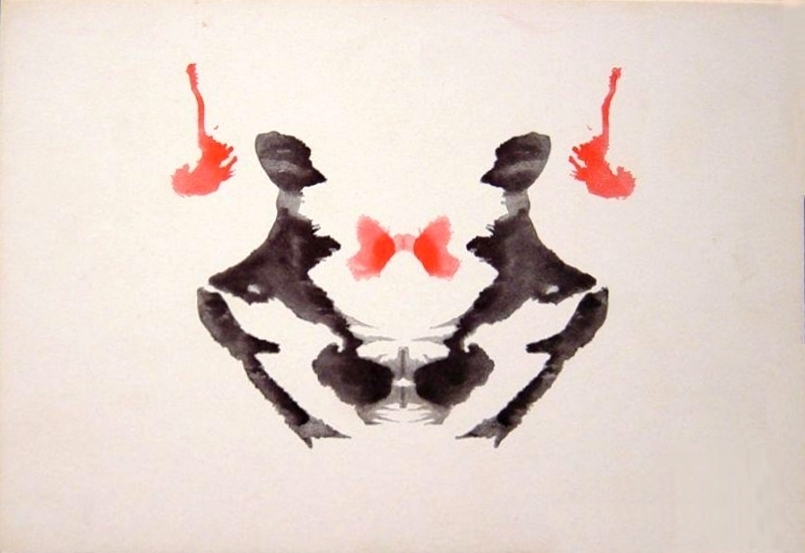
Rorschach test blot 03

Research using Rorschach test blot 03 finds that the number of unique responses to this random figure links to larger sized amygdalae. The researchers note, "Since previous reports have indicated that unique responses were observed at higher frequency in the artistic population than in the nonartistic normal population, this positive correlation suggests that amygdalar enlargement in the normal population might be related to creative mental activity."

== Neuropsychological correlates of amygdala activity ==
Early research on primates provided explanations as to the functions of the amygdala, as well as a basis for further research. As early as 1888, rhesus monkeys with a lesioned temporal cortex (including the amygdala) were observed to have significant social and emotional deficits. Heinrich Klüver and Paul Bucy later expanded upon this same observation by showing that large lesions to the anterior temporal lobe produced noticeable changes, including overreaction to all objects, hypoemotionality, loss of fear, hypersexuality, and hyperorality, a condition in which inappropriate objects are placed in the mouth. Some monkeys also displayed an inability to recognize familiar objects and would approach animate and inanimate objects indiscriminately, exhibiting a loss of fear towards the experimenters. This behavioral disorder was later named Klüver–Bucy syndrome accordingly, and later research proved it was specifically due to amygdala lesions. Monkey mothers who had amygdala damage showed a reduction in maternal behaviors towards their infants, often physically abusing or neglecting them. In 1981, researchers found that selective radio frequency lesions of the whole amygdala caused Klüver–Bucy syndrome.

=== Social function ===
The amygdala has a role in social function. Amygdala volume is associated with the size and complexity of social networks. Amygdala volume correlates positively with both the size (the number of contacts) and the complexity (the number of different groups) of social networks.

The amygdala is involved in facial recognition and emotional expressions. Its role in analysis of social situations stems specifically from its ability to identify and process changes in facial features, although it does not process the direction of a gaze toward a person.

The amygdala processes reactions to violations concerning personal space.

=== Alcoholism ===
The amygdala appears to play a role in binge drinking, being damaged by repeated episodes of intoxication and withdrawal. Protein kinase C-epsilon in the amygdala is important for regulating behavioral responses to morphine and ethanol and controlling anxiety-like behavior. The protein is involved in controlling the function of other proteins and plays a role in the development of the ability to consume a large amount of ethanol. The duration of chronic alcohol consumption and abstinence may affect dynamic brain network adaptations. When excessive drinking occurs, the amygdala is affected through behavioral changes and reduces the brain's plasticity. Often, when binge drinking or alcoholism occurs, the amygdala is affected and leads to behavior damage. These behavioral damages can be lack of control, inability to conduct oneself in a mature manner, irritability and aggressive behavior, anxiety, depression, personality disorders, excessive drug intake, bipolar disorder, confusion, higher tolerance levels, and inappropriate sexual behaviors with others and self.

=== Anxiety ===
Feelings of anxiety start with an environmental stimulus that provokes stress. This can include various smells, sights, and internal sensations that result in anxiety. The amygdala reacts to this stimuli by preparing to either stand and fight or to turn and run. The amygdala sends signals to the paraventricular nucleus of the hypothalamus for the initiation of the HPA axis response. Consequently, blood sugar rises, becoming immediately available to the muscles for quick energy. Shaking may occur in an attempt to return blood to the rest of the body. Long-term changes in amygdala neurons may also increase anxiety after long-term or traumatic stress, led by the action of stress-related hormones within the amygdala. On the flip side, blocking the action of stress hormones in the amygdala reduces anxiety. There may also be a link between the amygdala and anxiety.

The central nucleus of the amygdala has direct correlations to the hypothalamus and brainstem—areas directly related to fear and anxiety. This connection is evident from studies of animals that have undergone amygdalae removal.

The clusters of the amygdala are activated when an individual expresses feelings of fear or aggression. This occurs because the amygdala is the primary structure of the brain responsible for fight-or-flight response. Anxiety and panic attacks can occur when the amygdala senses environmental stressors that stimulate fight-or-flight response. The amygdala is involved in the expression of conditioned fear. Conditioned fear is the framework used to explain the behavior produced when an originally neutral stimulus is consistently paired with a stimulus that evokes fear. Fear is measured by changes in autonomic activity including increased heart rate, increased blood pressure, as well as in simple reflexes such as flinching or blinking. Studies in 2004 and 2006 showed that normal subjects exposed to images of frightened faces or faces of people from another race will show increased activity of the amygdala, even if that exposure is subliminal. However, the amygdala is not necessary for the processing of fear-related stimuli, since persons in whom it is bilaterally damaged show rapid reactions to fearful faces, even in the absence of a functional amygdala.

Patient S.M., sometimes referred to as SM-046, is an American woman with exclusive and complete bilateral amygdala destruction since late childhood as a consequence of Urbach–Wiethe disease, and has a physiologically greatly reduced ability to feel fear as a result. First described by scientists in 1994, S.M. has been studied extensively in scientific research; she has helped researchers elucidate the function of the amygdala.

=== Psychological disorders ===
With advances in neuroimaging technology such as MRI, neuroscientists have made significant findings concerning the amygdala in the human brain. A variety of data shows the amygdala has a substantial role in mental states, and is related to many psychological disorders. Some studies have shown children with anxiety disorders tend to have a smaller left amygdala. In the majority of the cases, there was an association between an increase in the size of the left amygdala with the use of SSRIs (antidepressant medication) or psychotherapy. The left amygdala has been linked to social anxiety disorder, obsessive–compulsive disorder, and post-traumatic stress disorder (PTSD), as well as more broadly to separation and generalized anxiety disorder. Multiple studies have found that the amygdalae may be responsible for the emotional reactions of PTSD patients. One study in particular found that when PTSD patients are shown pictures of faces with fearful expressions, their amygdalae tended to have a higher activation than someone without PTSD.

In 2006, researchers observed hyperactivity in the amygdala when patients were shown threatening faces or confronted with frightening situations. Patients with severe social phobia showed a correlation with increased response in the amygdala. Individuals with psychopathy show reduced autonomic responses to instructed fear cues than otherwise healthy individuals. Similarly, depressed patients showed exaggerated left amygdala activity when interpreting emotions for all faces, and especially for fearful faces. This hyperactivity was normalized when patients were administered antidepressant medication.

In a 2003 study, subjects with borderline personality disorder showed significantly greater left amygdala activity than normal control subjects. Some borderline patients even had difficulties classifying neutral faces or saw them as threatening. The amygdala has been observed to respond differently in people with bipolar disorder. Amygdala dysfunction during face emotion processing is well-documented in bipolar disorder. Individuals with bipolar disorder showed greater amygdala activity (especially the amygdala/medial-prefrontal-cortex circuit). For people with manic bipolar I disorder, a decreased negative functional connectivity between the orbitofrontal cortex and the amygdala was also observed. A 2003 study found that adult and adolescent bipolar patients tended to have considerably smaller amygdala volumes and somewhat smaller hippocampal volumes. Many studies have also focused on the connections between the amygdala and autism.

== See also ==
- Accessory olfactory cortical areas
- Amygdala hijack
- BELBIC
- Intercalated cells of the amygdala
- List of regions in the human brain
- Triune brain
- Amygdalotomy
- Amygdalohippocampectomy
