= Amygdalohippocampectomy =

- Hippocampi
- Specialty: Neurology

Amygdalohippocampectomy is a surgical procedure for the treatment of epilepsy. It consists of the removal of the hippocampus, which has a role in memory, spatial awareness, and navigation, and the amygdalae, which have a role in the processing and memory of emotional reactions, both structures forming part of the limbic system of the brain.

Amygdalohippocampectomy is used only when all other treatment options have failed to resolve the epilepsy. It is also used to cure severe aggression, and anxiety usually as a last resort treatment. It is an effective treatment for most patients. However, possible adverse side effects include impaired memory, dangerous risktaking behaviours, and defects in visual perception.

== Procedure ==
The amygdalohippocampectomy is indicated when the focal point of the seizures can be anatomically localized to the hippocampus and amygdala. Normally, to be considered for this procedure, one must either have failed all first-line treatments for epilepsy, or if all therapy fails for severe aggression and anxiety.

The selective amygdalohippocampectomy will remove only the offending portions of the hippocampus and amygdala. When data from studies of the electrophysiology and neuropathy vis-à-vis temporal lobe epilepsy determines this area to be the origin of seizure activity, the removal of the hippocampus and amygdala is usually indicated. Computer imaging is sometimes used to guide this procedure.

== Statistics and side effects ==
Of 376 patients who had the amygdalohippocampectomy procedure performed, compared to other types of temporal lobe resections, two thirds of this population were reported free of disabling seizures. Some patients report defects in visual perception and impaired memory function. Almost all of them reported not feeling as much fear as before, hence inducing the risk-taking behaviour.
