= Central nucleus of the amygdala =

Nucleus within the amygdala

Identifiers
- NeuroLex ID: birnlex_2682

The central nucleus of the amygdala (CeA or aCeN) is a nucleus within the amygdala. It serves as the major output nucleus of the amygdala and participates in receiving and processing pain information.

CeA connects with brainstem areas that control the expression of innate behaviors and associated physiological responses.

CeA is responsible for autonomic emotions primarily through output pathways to the lateral hypothalamus and brain stem. The CeA is also responsible for conscious perception of emotion primarily through the ventral amygdalofugal output pathway to the anterior cingulate cortex, orbitofrontal cortex, and prefrontal cortex.

== Amygdala subdividisions and outputs ==
Inputs and outputs of the rodent central amygdala

The regions described as amygdala nuclei encompass several structures with distinct connectional and functional characteristics in humans and other animals. Among these nuclei are the basolateral complex, the cortical nucleus, the medial nucleus, and the central nucleus. The basolateral complex can be further subdivided into the lateral, the basal, and the accessory basal nuclei.

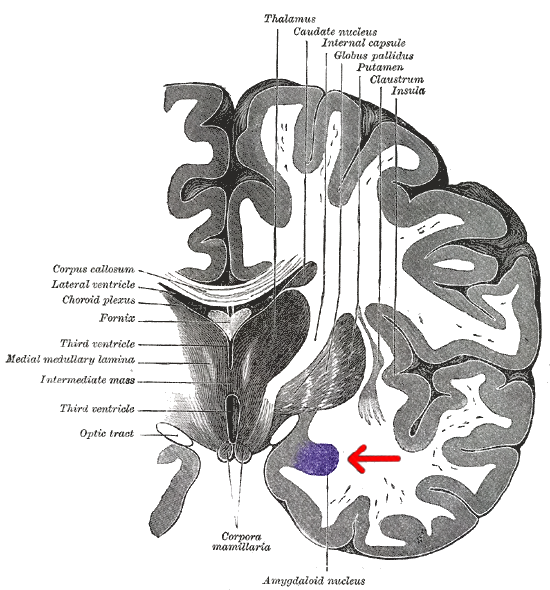
Coronal section of brain through intermediate mass of third ventricle. Amygdala is shown in purple.

The amygdalofugal pathway (Latin for "fleeing from the amygdala" and commonly distinguished as the ventral amygdalofugal pathway) is one of the three principal pathways by which fibers leave the amygdala. The other main efferent pathways from the amygdala are the stria terminalis and anterior commissure. The anterior commissure also serves to connect the two amygdala.

The ventral amygdalofugal pathway carries output from the central and basolateral nuclei and delivers it to a number of targets; namely, the medial dorsal nucleus of the thalamus, the hypothalamus, the basal forebrain, the brain stem, septal nuclei and nucleus accumbens.

== Research ==
- "psychological stressor induced an increase in both CRH mRNA levels and CRH content in the CEA. Exposure to the psychological stressor also caused a significant increase in CRH mRNA levels with a trend for an increase in CRH content in the dorsolateral subdivision of the bed nucleus of the stria terminalis (BNST) which is anatomically associated with the CEA."
- "oxytocin in the CeA exerts a facilitatory role in the maintenance of hydroelectrolyte balance"
- "the central nucleus of the amygdala (CeA) and its connections with the nigral dopamine system have been reported to modulate cognitive processes dependent substantially on attentional allocation. CeA dopamine function is involved in modulation of disengagement behavior."
- "Opioid mechanisms are involved in the control of water and NaCl intake and opioid receptors (ORs) are present in the central nucleus of the amygdala (CeA)" μ-opioid receptors "in the CeA increases hypertonic sodium intake, whereas antagonizing these sites inhibits hypertonic sodium intake. …μ-ORs in the CeA in a positive regulation of sodium intake."
- CeA "is essential for acquiring and expressing conditional fear after overtraining"
- "glucocorticoids can facilitate CRH mRNA expression in the CEA, a site implicated in anxiety and fear"
- Neuronal activity in the central nucleus of the amygdala was found to be a critical brain substrate for incubation of methamphetamine craving as well as neurobiological responses to ethanol.

== See also ==
- Fear conditioning
- Intercalated cells of the amygdala
