= Neuromorality =

Field of neuroscience

Neuromorality is an emerging field of neuroscience that studies the connection between morality and neuronal function. Scientists use fMRI and psychological assessment together to investigate the neural basis of moral cognition and behavior. Evidence shows that the central hub of morality is the prefrontal cortex guiding activity to other nodes of the neuromoral network. A spectrum of functional characteristics within this network to give rise to both altruistic and psychopathological behavior. Evidence from the investigation of neuromorality has applications in both clinical neuropsychiatry and forensic neuropsychiatry.

== Brain anatomy ==
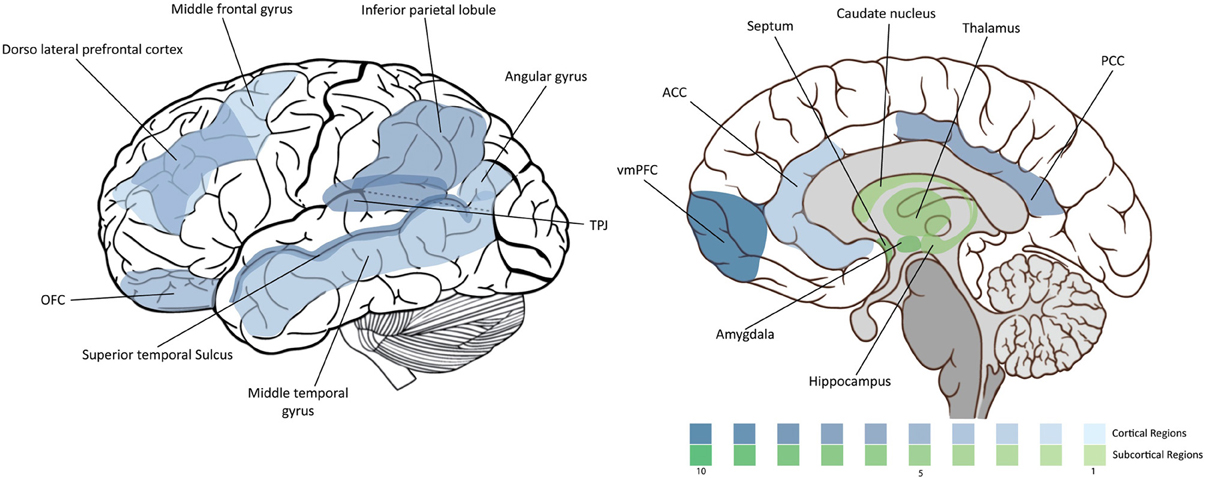
Areas of the brain related to moral processing and their corresponding citation density

The main brain regions that are involved in the regulation of moral cognition and behavior are those of the ventromedial prefrontal cortex, ventrolateral prefrontal cortex, dorsolateral prefrontal cortex, orbitofrontal cortex, and amygdala. Less pronounced areas that are involved in moral regulation include the anterior cingulate gyrus, posterior cingulate gyrus, anterior insula, and the mesolimbic reward pathway.

== Methods of investigation ==
To analyze the neuromoral circuit scientists perform experimental paradigms utilizing fMRI and tasks that assess moral reasoning and judgment. One method includes the administration of moral dilemmas to subjects, in the form of anecdotes, while their brain activity is measured by fMRI. Another approach includes the presentation of emotionally charged moral or immoral scenes and images to subjects while their brain activity is measured by fMRI. Moreover, measuring neuronal assembly activity during personal and impersonal moral dilemmas has also been a method of investigating morality at the brain level. Finally, the pathological approach investigates tissue abnormalities in the neuromoral network and links them to potential cognitive and behavioral deficits.

== Functional order ==
Normal functioning of the neuromoral network involves specific patterns of activity when performing moral tasks. The ventromedial prefrontal cortex is the hub of the neuromoral circuit allowing for the processing of morally charged stimuli and the subsequent generation of states such as empathy, charitableness, fairness, and guilt. The dorsolateral prefrontal cortex allows for the integration of those states, subsequent moral reasoning, and generation of the ability to override emotional states relating to morality. The orbitofrontal cortex allows for the processing of moral or immoral behaviors performed by others allowing for mapping and imitation of the observed behaviors. The amygdala allows for sensory recognition of non-integrated emotional stimuli that are channeled to the ventromedial prefrontal cortex for moral indexing and processing. The mesolimbic reward pathway has been implicated with the generation of pleasurable feelings when a non-moral act is performed towards a hostile entity, a phenomenon called Schadenfreude. The cingulate cortex allows for conflict regulation when performing an immoral action and the feeling of envy when self identified entities are overcome by non identified ones.

== Functional disorder ==
=== Psychopathy ===
Psychopathy is a brain disorder remarked by lack of moral emotions, empathy, remorse and guilt. People with psychopathy appear to have defects in moral judgement, but not in moral reasoning. Neuroimaging of the psychopathic brain has revealed hypoperfusion and hypometabolism in areas of the frontal cortex. The areas of the medial prefrontal cortex and the orbitofrontal cortex correlate with a higher score in the psychopathy scale. The amygdala is also dysfunctional in psychopaths decreasing the ability to recognize emotional stimuli and lacking the ability to promote activity in the moral promoting region of the ventromedial prefrontal cortex.

=== Brain lesions ===
Damage to the ventromedial prefrontal cortex led Phineas Gage to act without any moral consideration.

The most studied case of a brain lesion affecting the neuromoral network was that of Phineas Gage who suffered from damage to the ventromedial prefrontal cortex due to an accident. The damage led Gage through a complete personality transformation that included the expression of socially inappropriate statements and lies towards his family and friends. Lesions in the right hemisphere's frontal lobe are associated with antisocial states and left frontal lesions are associated with increase in violent behaviors. Individuals with focal lesions in the ventromedial prefrontal cortex and the orbitofrontal cortex exhibit amoral choices in moral tasks and lack of empathy, compassion, shame, and guilt.

== Clinical neuropsychology ==
The study of brain areas that relate to morality can be utilized to promote moral behavior through transcranial magnetic stimulation and transcranial direct-current stimulation. Stimulation of the medial prefrontal cortex results in reduction of racial biases and increase in rejection of unfair offers. Stimulation of the dorsolateral prefrontal cortex increases trust and cooperation, decreases proactive aggression in males, increases empathy, and increases the acceptance of unfair offers. Stimulation of the ventrolateral prefrontal cortex decreases aggressive behavior following exclusion.

== Forensic neuroscience ==
Criminal offenders have substantial impairment in elements of the neuromoral circuit. Dysfunction in the area of the dorsolateral prefrontal cortex has been linked to the antisocial features of impulsivity and lack of social inhibition. Dysfunction to the anterior cingulate has been linked to low emotional processing and increased aggressiveness. As in the case of Michael below, damage to the orbitofrontal cortex has been linked to antisocial and criminal behavior. Damage to the ventromedial prefrontal cortex has been linked to antisocial behavior, poor and amoral decision making, and reduced autonomic response to emotionally arousing stimuli. Evidence relating to the function of the neuromoral circuit has been proposed to be a new avenue towards the justice of criminal offenders. Such an application includes the ability to detect lying through fMRI.

A case where the neuromoral circuits function was implicated with the judiciary system was that of Michael. Michael was a school teacher who started behaving abnormally by bringing pornographic content to school and trying to have sexual intercourse with his stepdaughter. When he was taken into custody he expressed severe headaches and was taken to the nearby hospital. An fMRI of his brain revealed a tumor in the base of his orbitofrontal cortex. When the tumor was removed his behavior returned to normal.

The story of Donta Page is another example of the application of our knowledge of the neuromoral circuit. Page was trialled for the rape and murder of a young woman. During the trial his past history of being abused in conjunction to imaging of his brain, showing damage to the neuromoral circuit, led to the reduction his sentence from death sentence to imprisonment for life.
