= Orbital surface =

Orbital surface may refer to:

- Orbitofrontal cortex
- Orbital surface of body of maxilla
