= Antoine Bechara =

American neuroscientist

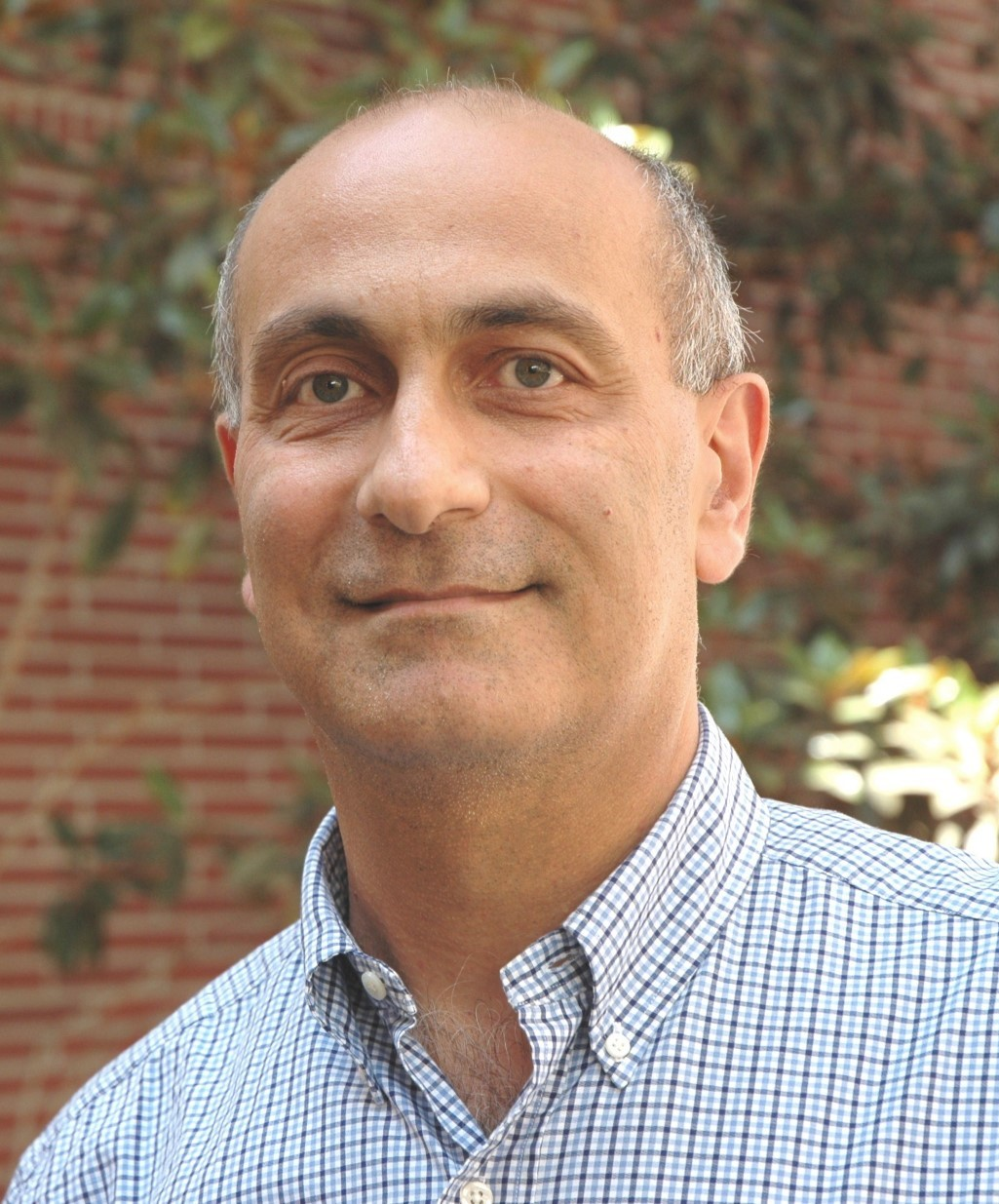
- Education: University of Toronto
- Occupations: Neuroscientist, academic and researcher
- Known for: Developer of the Iowa Gambling Task
- Awards: Centennial Award, Medical Research Council of Canada (MRC); Doctor Honoris Causa, University of Cordoba
- Scientific career
- Workplaces: University of Southern California

Antoine Bechara is an American neuroscientist, academic and researcher. He is currently a professor of Psychology and Neuroscience at the University of Southern California.

== Education ==
Bechara studied at the University of Toronto, and earned his Doctoral degree in 1991. He then completed his Fellowship in Behavioral Neurology from the University of Iowa in 1996.

== Career ==
Following his Postdoctoral fellowship, Bechara held appointment as an assistant professor of neurology at the University of Iowa College of Medicine in 1997, and was promoted to associate professor of Neurology in 2004. In 2005, he joined the University of Southern California as an associate professor of Psychology and Neuroscience, and became Professor in 2008.

Bechara is the Editor of Frontiers in Psychology: Psychopathology Section, and also served on the editorial board of several scientific journals, including Neuropsychology, Journal of Neuroscience, Psychology, and Economics, and Journal of Behavioral Decision Making.

== Research ==
Bechara has published over 400 papers, has been cited over 79,000 times, and has a Google Scholar H-index of 113. His work is focused on understanding the neural processes underlying how we make decisions and choices. He has co-edited a book entitled, Obesity Prevention: The Role of Brain and Society on Individual Behavior.

=== Iowa Gambling Task ===
Bechara introduced a neuropsychological task thought to simulate real-life decision making, which became known as the Iowa Gambling Task (IGT). He also proposed approaches to understand the neural processes underlying how we make decisions, using functional neuroimaging, and work with brain damaged patients.

Along with Antonio R Damasio and Hanna Damasio, Bechara conducted a series of studies to characterize the decision-making capabilities of patients who have suffered injury to their frontal lobe (the prefrontal cortex). At the time, the abnormal decision-making seen in these patients was puzzling because of the lack of a laboratory probe to detect and evaluate this decision-making abnormality in the clinic. The development of the IGT enabled investigators to detect these patients' elusive impairment in the laboratory, measure it, and investigate its possible causes.

=== Brain mechanisms ===
Bechara studied brain mechanisms behind addiction and substance use disorders, while conducting his research on brain lesion patients. He discussed neuro-anatomical systems underlying emotion, highlighted the disturbances in emotional experience after focal brain lesions, and also defined the role of emotions in the context of influencing and modulating our cognitions. He was among the early researchers who showed that addiction is also a disorder of abnormal decision-making. In his studies, he also evaluated various neuroscientific theories about drug-use behavior, and demonstrated the role of the brain pathways involved in pain, pleasure, decision-making, craving and addiction.

Bechara also discovered in his lab that damage to a small brain region, named the insula, wipes out smoking addiction. This finding brought to light the potential role of a new neural region, which was completely ignored in the past, in the psychopathology of addiction.

=== Decision-making in several behaviors ===
Bechara studied decision making in terms of several behaviors, including economic behavior, gambling behavior, food addiction, Internet and social media addiction He explored the role of biology in economic decision making by combining insights from cognitive neuroscience, psychology and economics. Using somatic marker hypothesis, he further discussed the contribution of orbitofrontal cortex in decision making and emotional processing, and the relationship between emotion, decision making and other cognitive functions of the frontal lobe, namely working memory.

== Awards and honors ==
- 1994 - Centennial Award, Medical Research Council of Canada (MRC)
- 2008 - Doctor Honoris Causa, University of Cordoba
- 2013 - Nominated by USC Provost for the Grawemeyer's Award

== Selected bibliography ==
=== Books ===
- Obesity Prevention: The Role of Brain and Society on Individual Behavior (2010) ISBN 978-0123743879

=== Selected articles ===
- Bechara, A., Damasio, A. R., Damasio, H., & Anderson, S. W. (1994). Insensitivity to future consequences following damage to human prefrontal cortex. Cognition, 50(1-3), 7–15.
- Bechara, A., Damasio, H., Tranel, D., & Damasio, A. R. (1997). Deciding advantageously before knowing the advantageous strategy. Science, 275(5304), 1293–1295.
- Bechara, A., Damasio, H., Damasio, A. R., & Lee, G. P. (1999). Different contributions of the human amygdala and ventromedial prefrontal cortex to decision-making. Journal of neuroscience, 19(13), 5473–5481.
- Bechara, A., Damasio, H., & Damasio, A. R. (2000). Emotion, decision making and the orbitofrontal cortex. Cerebral cortex, 10(3), 295–307.
- Damasio, A. R., Grabowski, T. J., Bechara, A., Damasio, H., Ponto, L. L., Parvizi, J., & Hichwa, R. D. (2000). Subcortical and cortical brain activity during the feeling of self-generated emotions. Nature neuroscience, 3(10), 1049–1056.
