= Iowa gambling task =

Psychology test

The Iowa gambling task (IGT) is a psychological task thought to simulate real-life decision making. It was introduced by Antoine Bechara, Antonio Damasio, Hanna Damasio and Steven Anderson, then researchers at the University of Iowa. It has been brought to popular attention by Antonio Damasio (proponent of the somatic marker hypothesis) in his best-selling book Descartes' Error.

The IGT is thought to measure an individual's approach to risk-taking, impulsivity, and ability to delay short-term gratification to achieve long-term rewards.

The task was originally presented simply as the Gambling Task, or the "OGT". Later, it has been referred to as the Iowa gambling task and, less frequently, as Bechara's Gambling Task. The Iowa gambling task is widely used in research of cognition and emotion. A recent review listed more than 400 papers that made use of this paradigm.

== Task structure ==
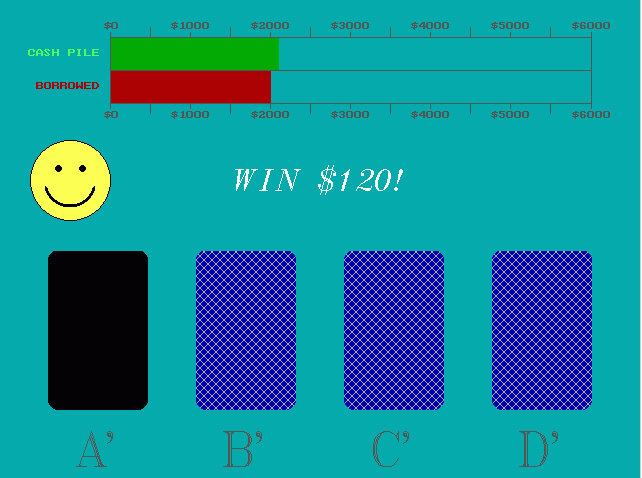
Screen shot of the Iowa gambling task

Participants are presented with four virtual decks of cards on a computer screen. They are told that each deck holds cards that will either reward or penalize them, using game money. The goal of the game is to win as much money as possible.

Unbeknownst to the participant, the decks differ from each other in the balance of reward versus penalty cards. Thus, some decks are "bad decks", and other decks are "good decks", because some decks will tend to reward the player more often than other decks. Participants are not told that the two "bad" decks have larger rewards and larger or more frequent penalties.

On balance, the penalties in the "bad" decks outweigh the higher rewards they give. Therefore, participants should choose the decks with smaller rewards, as they will also give significantly fewer penalties and give a better long-term payout.

=== Common findings ===
Most healthy participants sample cards from each deck, and after about 40 or 50 selections are fairly effective at identifying and sticking to the good decks. Patients with orbitofrontal cortex (OFC) dysfunction, however, continue to persevere with the bad decks, sometimes even though they know that they are losing money overall. Concurrent measurement of galvanic skin response shows that healthy participants show a "stress" reaction to hovering over the bad decks after only 10 trials, long before conscious sensation that the decks are bad. By contrast, patients with amygdala lesions never develop this physiological reaction to impending punishment. In another test, patients with ventromedial prefrontal cortex (vmPFC) dysfunction were shown to choose outcomes that yield high immediate gains in spite of higher losses in the future. Bechara and his colleagues explain these findings in terms of the somatic marker hypothesis.

The Iowa gambling task is currently being used by a number of research groups using fMRI to investigate which brain regions are activated by the task in healthy volunteers as well as clinical groups with conditions such as schizophrenia and obsessive compulsive disorder.

== Critiques ==
Although the IGT has achieved prominence, it is not without its critics. Criticisms have been raised over both its design and its interpretation. Published critiques include:

- A paper by Dunn, Dalgliesh and Lawrence
- Research by Lin, Chiu, Lee and Hsieh, who argue that a common result (the "prominent deck B" phenomenon) argues against some of the interpretations that the IGT has been claimed to support.
- Research by Chiu and Lin, the "sunken deck C" phenomenon was identified, which confirmed a serious confound embedded in the original design of IGT, this confound makes IGT serial studies misinterpret the effect of gain-loss frequency as final-outcome for somatic marker hypothesis.
- A research group in Taiwan utilized an IGT-modified and relatively symmetrical gamble for gain-loss frequency and long-term outcome, namely the Soochow gambling task (SGT) demonstrated a reverse finding of Iowa gambling task. Normal decision makers in SGT were mostly occupied by the immediate perspective of gain-loss and inability to hunch the long-term outcome in the standard procedure of IGT (100 trials under uncertainty). In his book, Inside the investor's brain, Richard L. Peterson considered the serial findings of SGT may be congruent with Nassim Taleb's suggestion on some fooled choices in investment.
