= Somatic marker hypothesis =

Hypothesis that emotional processes guide or bias decision-making

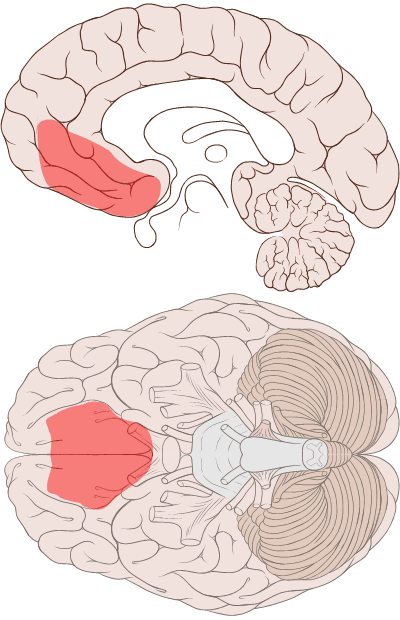
Somatic markers are probably stored in the ventromedial prefrontal cortex (highlighted).

The somatic marker hypothesis, formulated by Antonio Damasio and associated researchers, proposes that emotional processes guide (or bias) behavior, particularly decision-making.

"Somatic markers" are feelings in the body that are associated with emotions, such as the association of rapid heartbeat with anxiety or of nausea with disgust. According to the hypothesis, somatic markers strongly influence subsequent decision-making. Within the brain, somatic markers are thought to be processed in the ventromedial prefrontal cortex (vmPFC) and the amygdala. The hypothesis has been tested in experiments using the Iowa gambling task.

== Background ==
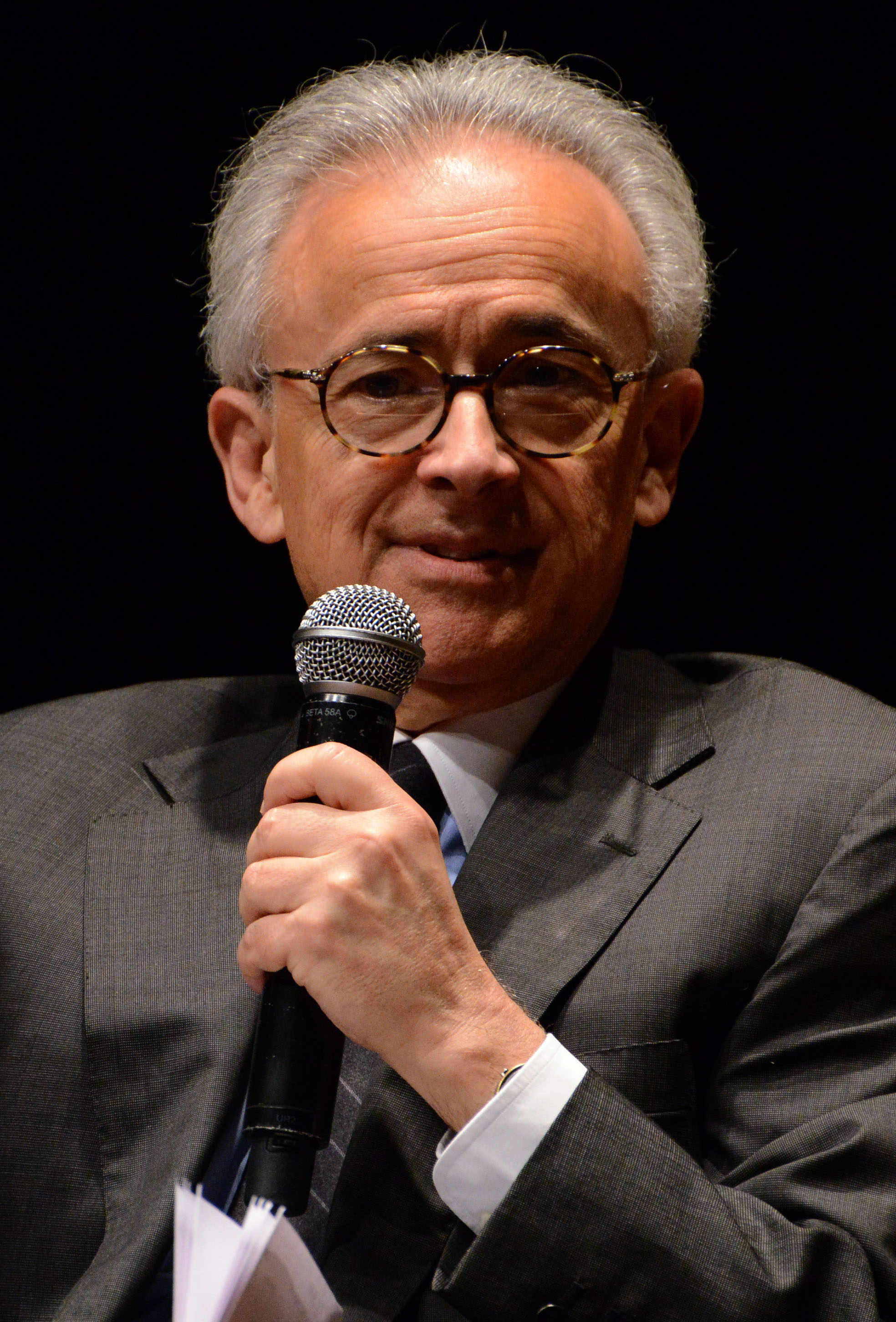
Antonio Damasio, proponent of the somatic marker hypothesis

In economic theory, human decision-making is often modeled as being devoid of emotions, involving only logical reasoning based on cost-benefit calculations. In contrast, the somatic marker hypothesis proposes that emotions play a critical role in the ability to make fast, rational decisions in complex and uncertain situations.

Patients with frontal lobe damage, such as Phineas Gage, provided the first evidence that the frontal lobes were associated with decision-making. Frontal lobe damage, particularly to the vmPFC, results in impaired abilities to organize and plan behavior and learn from previous mistakes, without affecting intellect in terms of working memory, attention, and language comprehension and expression.

vmPFC patients also have difficulty expressing and experiencing appropriate emotions. This led Antonio Damasio to hypothesize that decision-making deficits following vmPFC damage result from the inability to use emotions to help guide future behavior based on past experiences. Consequently, vmPFC damage forces those affected to rely on slow and laborious cost-benefit analyses for every given choice situation.

== Hypothesis ==
When individuals make decisions, they must assess the incentive value of the choices available to them, using cognitive and emotional processes. When the individuals face complex and conflicting choices, they may be unable to decide using only cognitive processes, which may become overloaded. Emotions, consequently, are hypothesized to guide decision-making.

Emotions, as defined by Damasio, are changes in both body and brain states in response to stimuli. Physiological changes (such as muscle tone, heart rate, endocrine activity, posture, facial expression, and so forth) occur in the body and are relayed to the brain where they are transformed into an emotion that tells the individual something about the stimulus that they have encountered. Over time, emotions and their corresponding bodily changes, which are called "somatic markers", become associated with particular situations and their past outcomes.

When making subsequent decisions, these somatic markers and their evoked emotions are consciously or unconsciously associated with their past outcomes, and influence decision-making in favor of some behaviors instead of others. For instance, when a somatic marker associated with a positive outcome is perceived, the person may feel happy and thereby motivated to pursue that behavior. When a somatic marker associated with the negative outcome is perceived, the person may feel sad, which acts as an internal alarm to warn the individual to avoid that course of action. These situation-specific somatic states are based on, and reinforced by, past experiences help to guide behavior in favor of more advantageous choices, and therefore are adaptive.

According to the hypothesis, two distinct pathways reactivate somatic marker responses. In the first pathway, emotion can be evoked by changes in the body that are projected to the brain – called the "body loop". For instance, encountering a feared object like a snake may initiate the fight-or-flight response and cause fear. In the second pathway, cognitive representations of the emotions (imagining an unpleasant situation "as if" you were in that particular situation) can be activated in the brain without being directly elicited by a sensory stimulus – called the "as-if body loop". Thus, the brain can anticipate expected bodily changes, which allows the individual to respond faster to external stimuli without waiting for an event to actually occur. The amygdala and vmPFC (a subsection of the orbital and medial prefrontal cortex or OMPFC) are essential components of this hypothesized mechanism, and therefore damage to either structure will disrupt decision-making.

== Experimental evidence ==
In an effort to produce a simple neuropsychological tool that would assess deficits in emotional processing, decision-making, and social skills of OMPFC-lesioned individuals, Bechara and collaborators created the Iowa gambling task. The task measures a form of emotion-based learning. Studies using the gambling task have found deficits in various neurological (such as amygdala and OMPFC lesions) and psychiatric populations (such as schizophrenia, mania, and drug abusers).

The Iowa gambling task is a computerized test in which participants are presented with four decks of cards from which they repeatedly choose. Each deck contains various amounts of rewards of either $50 or $100, and occasional losses that are greater in the decks with higher rewards. The participants do not know where the penalty cards are located, and are told to pick cards that will maximize their winnings. The most profitable strategy turns out to be to choose cards only from the small reward/small penalty decks, because although the reward is smaller, the penalty is proportionally much smaller than in the high reward/high penalty decks. Over the course of a session, most healthy participants come to adopt the profitable low-penalty deck strategy. Participants with brain damage, however, are unable to determine the better deck to choose from, and continue to choose from the high reward/high penalty decks.

Since the Iowa gambling task measures participants' quickness in "developing anticipatory emotional responses to guide advantageous choices", it is helpful in testing the somatic marker hypothesis. According to the hypothesis, somatic markers give rise to anticipation of the emotional consequences of a decision being made. Consequently, persons who perform well on the task are thought to be aware of the penalty cards and of the negative emotions associated with drawing such cards, and to realize which deck is less likely to yield a penalty.

This experiment has been used to analyze the impairments of people with damage to the vmPFC, which has been known to affect neural signaling of prospective rewards or punishments. Such persons perform less well on the task. Functional magnetic resonance imaging (fMRI) has been used to analyze the brain during the Iowa gambling task. The brain regions that were activated during the Iowa gambling task were also the ones hypothesized to be triggered by somatic markers during decision-making.

== Evolutionary significance ==
Damasio has posited that the ability of humans to perform abstract thinking quickly and efficiently coincides with both the development of the vmPFC and with the use of somatic markers to guide human behavior during evolution. Patients with damage to the vmPFC are more likely to engage in behaviors that negatively impact personal relationships in the distant future, but they never engage in actions that would lead to immediate harm to themselves or others. Damasio and Bechara assert that the evolution of the prefrontal cortex was associated with the ability to represent events that may occur in the future.

== Application to risky behavior ==
The somatic marker hypothesis has been applied to trying to understand risky behaviors, such as risky sexual behavior and drug addiction.

According to the hypothesis, riskier sexual behaviors are more exhilarating and pleasurable, and therefore they are more likely to stimulate repetitive engagement in such behaviors. When this idea was tested in individuals who were infected with HIV and were substance dependent, differences were found between persons who scored well in the Iowa gambling test, and those who scored poorly. The high scorers showed a correlation between the amount of distress they reported having over their HIV status, and their acceptance of risk during sexual behavior – the greater the distress, the greater the risk that these people would take. The low scorers, on the other hand, showed no such correlation. These results were interpreted as indicating that persons with intact decision-making abilities are better able to rely on past emotional experiences when weighing risks, than are persons who are deficient in such abilities, and that acceptance of risk serves to ameliorate emotional distress.

Drug abusers are thought to ignore the negative consequences of addiction while seeking drugs. According to the somatic marker hypothesis, such abusers are impaired in their ability to recall and consider past unpleasant experiences when weighing whether to consider drug seeking behaviors. Researchers analyzed the neuroendocrine responses of substance-dependent individuals and healthy individuals after being shown pleasant or unpleasant images. In response to unpleasant images, drug users showed decreased levels of several neuroendocrine markers, including norepinephrine, cortisol, and adrenocorticotropic hormone. Addicts showed lesser responses to both pleasant and unpleasant images, suggesting that they may have a diminished emotional response. Neuroimaging studies utilizing fMRI indicate that drug-related stimuli have the ability to activate brain regions involved in emotional evaluation and reward processing. When shown a film of people smoking cocaine, cocaine users showed greater activation of the anterior cingulate cortex, the right inferior parietal lobe, and the caudate nucleus than did non-users. Conversely, the cocaine users showed lesser activation when viewing a sex film than did non-users.

== Criticism ==
Some researchers believe that the use of somatic markers (i.e., afferent feedback) would be a very inefficient method of influencing behavior. Damasio's notion of the as-if experience dependent feedback route, whereby bodily responses are re-represented utilizing the somatosensory cortex (postcentral gyrus), also proposes an inefficient method of affecting explicit behavior. Edmund Rolls (1999) stated that; "it would be very inefficient and noisy to place in the execution route a peripheral response, and transducers to attempt to measure that peripheral response, itself a notoriously difficult procedure" (p. 73). Reinforcement association located in the orbitofrontal cortex and amygdala, where the incentive value of stimuli is decoded, is sufficient to elicit emotion-based learning and to affect behavior via, for example, the orbitofrontal-striatal pathway. This process can occur via implicit or explicit processes.

The somatic marker hypothesis represents a model of how feedback from the body may contribute to both advantageous and disadvantageous decision-making in situations of complexity and uncertainty. Much of its supporting data comes from data taken from the Iowa gambling task. While the Iowa gambling task has proven to be an ecologically valid measure of decision-making impairment, there exist three assumptions that need to hold true.

First, the claim that it assesses implicit learning as the reward/punishment design is inconsistent with data showing accurate knowledge of the task possibilities and that mechanisms such as working-memory appear to have a strong influence. Second, the claim that this knowledge occurs through preventive marker signals is not supported by competing explanations of the psychophysiology generated profile. Lastly, the claim that the impairment is due to a 'myopia for the future' is undermined by more plausible psychological mechanisms explaining deficits on the tasks such as reversal learning, risk-taking, and working-memory deficits. There may also be more variability in control performance than previously thought, thus complicating the interpretation of the findings.

Furthermore, although the somatic marker hypothesis has accurately identified many of the brain regions involved in decision-making, emotion, and body-state representation, it has failed to clearly demonstrate how these processes interact at a psychological and evolutionary level. There are many experiments that could be implemented to further test the somatic marker hypothesis. One way would be to develop variants of the Iowa gambling task that control some of the methodological issues and interpretation ambiguities generated. It may be a good idea to include removing the reversal learning confound, which would make the task more difficult to consciously comprehend. Additionally, causal tests of the somatic marker hypothesis could be practiced more insistently in a greater range of populations with altered peripheral feedback, like on patients with facial paralysis.

In conclusion, the somatic marker hypothesis needs to be tested in more experiments. Until a wider range of empirical approaches are employed in order to test the somatic marker hypothesis, it appears that the framework is simply an intriguing idea that is in need of some better supporting evidence. Despite these issues, the somatic marker hypothesis and the Iowa gambling task reestablish the notion that emotion has the potential to be a benefit as well as a problem during the decision-making process in humans.

== See also ==
- James–Lange theory
- Somatization
