= Heinrich Frenkel =

Swiss physician (1860–1931)

- Born: 5 June 1860
- Died: 21 April 1931 (aged 70)
- Scientific career
- Fields: Neurology, Physiology

Heinrich Simon Frenkel (5 June 1860 in Heiden, Switzerland – 21 April 1931 in Dresden-Loschwitz) was a Swiss physician and neurologist born in Heiden, a town overlooking Lake Constance. He was an early practitioner of neuro-rehabilitation, advocating a regimen of special exercises for patients with neurological disorders.

== Biography ==
He studied medicine at the Universities of Heidelberg and Leipzig, and was a student of neurologist Wilhelm Heinrich Erb (1840–1921). In 1884 he earned his degree at Leipzig, afterwards returning to Heiden to practice medicine.

At Heiden he rented a house in "Cure Park" and filled it with specialized exercise equipment. Here he established a center of physical medicine and rehabilitation, where patients with neurological impairments could reinstate dexterity and improve mobility.

Frenkel achieved great success with therapeutic exercises for cerebellar ataxia and ataxia. This success eventually attracted patients from all parts of Europe, and even America: see Frenkel Exercises.

He was visited in Heiden by Rubens Hirschberg (1862–1920), who was an assistant to French neurologist Fulgence Raymond (1844–1910). Hirschberg was deeply impressed with Frenkel's work with neurological disorders, and on his return to Paris, convinced Raymond to establish a gymnasium in the neurology department at the Salpétriére. In addition, renowned neurosurgeon Otfrid Foerster (1873–1941) was greatly influenced by Frenkel's work and spent considerable time at Heiden.

In 1896 Frenkel relocated to Berlin, where in 1913 he attained the title of professor. Here he served as head of the serological department at the clinic of psychiatry and neurology at Charité Hospital. He was the author of Die Therapie ataktischer Bewegungsstörungen, a treatise on treatment of tabetic ataxia by means of systematic exercise and movement therapy. His name is associated with "Frenkel's symptom", which is defined as lowered muscular tonus in tabetic neurosyphilis.

Frenkel died in Dresden, Germany and his body was brought to Heiden, Switzerland for burial. His daughter Margerita Serena, called Rita, was born in Pallanza in 1891. In 1914 she married Wilhelm von Gonzenbach (1880–1955), a Swiss bacteriologist, and died in Zürich in 1972.

== Sources ==
- Zwecker M., Zeilig G., Ohry A. Professor Heinrich Sebastian Frenkel: a forgotten founder of Rehabilitation Medicine. Nature.com.
- NCBI: PubMed; Heinrich Frenkel
