= Frenkel exercises =

Set of exercises to treat ataxia

Frenkel exercises are a set of exercises developed by Professor Heinrich Sebastian Frenkel to treat ataxia, in particular cerebellar ataxia.

They are a system of exercises consisting of slow, repeated movements. They increase in difficulty over the time of the program. The patient watches their hand or arm movements (for example) and corrects them as needed.

Although the technique is simple, needs virtually no exercise equipment, and can be done on one's own, concentration and some degree of perseverance is required. Research has shown that 20,000 to 30,000 repetitions may be required to produce results. A simple calculation will show that this can be achieved by doing 60 repetitions every hour for six weeks in a 16-hour daily waking period. The repetitions will take just a few minutes every hour.

The brain as a whole learns to compensate for motor deficits in the cerebellum (or the spinal cord where applicable). If the ataxia affects say, head movements, the patient can use a mirror or combination of mirrors to watch their own head movements.

== History ==
The exercises were developed by Heinrich Frenkel, a Swiss neurologist who, one day in 1887, while examining a patient with ataxia, observed the patient's poor performance of the finger-to-nose test.

The patient asked Dr Frenkel about the test and was told what it meant and that he did not 'pass' the test. Several months later, on re-examination, the patient showed extraordinary improvement in coordination.

Frenkel was astonished by the improvement. He had never seen such an improvement before, which was contradictory to the teaching of the day.

When Frenkel asked the patient what had happened in the interval, the patient replied, 'I wanted to pass the test and so I practiced.' This event inspired Frenkel to a general assumption: 'If one patient can reduce his ataxia by practice, why not all? Or at least others?' He immediately started to study the problem in a practical manner.

== Practice ==
In his book on ataxia, Frenkel states: "The visual sense is the greatest supporting factor in the treatment". This means the patient must watch their own movements while practicing them.

Frenkel's book states that the best way to perform the exercises is to do them for three minutes using some kind of timer so the exercises become less of a chore. Then the patient should do something entirely different and unrelated for fifteen minutes, say read a book or have a chat. At that point the patient goes back to the exercises for another three minutes when it will be found that the skill has improved to a step higher from when the exercises were last done fifteen minutes earlier. It is thought that the fifteen-minute break enables the new neural connections to be created.

Frenkel's book posits that these sessions should be done every day for at least six weeks.

The patient can treat themself and obviously in the absence of a medical practitioner must do so. However, it is better that a physiotherapist is involved. He or she motivates and guides the patient in how to watch themself move. The therapist may also help the patient move where muscular strength is low.

Frenkel states that is very important that the therapist also gives the patient pep talks and motivation.

Frenkel asserted that the patient had to be free from opiate and alcohol use, for instance, in order to achieve the required focus of attention.
