= Otfrid Foerster =

German neurologist and neurosurgeon

Foerster before the war

Otfrid Foerster (German: [ˈfœʁstɐ]; 9 November 1873 – 15 June 1941) was a German neurologist and neurosurgeon, who made innovative contributions to neurology and neurosurgery, such as rhizotomy for the treatment of spasticity, anterolateral cordotomy for pain, the hyperventilation test for epilepsy, Foerster's syndrome, the first electrocorticogram of a brain tumor, and the first surgeries for epilepsy. He also made influential contributions in advancing knowledge of dermatomes (an area of skin that is supplied by a single pair of dorsal nerve roots), building upon previous work of Herringham, Thorburn, Sherrington, and others. He also helped map the motor cortex of the cerebrum.

== Life ==
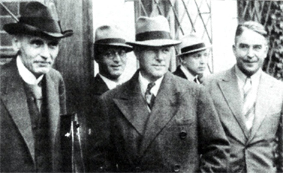
Otfrid Foerster, Herbert Olivecrona and Wilhelm Tönnis

Foerster was born in Breslau (now Wrocław) to Richard Foerster, and studied in the Maria Magdalenen Gymnasium, graduating 1892. From 1892 to 1896 he studied medicine in Freiburg, Kiel and Breslau, obtaining his licensure by state examination in 1897 and his doctorate in the same year. Upon completion of the doctoral studies, he spent two years studying abroad, following a suggestion by Karl Wernicke (1848-1905): in the summer he went to Paris, studying with Joseph Jules Dejerine and attending classes by Pierre Marie and Joseph Babinski (1857-1932); and in the summer with Heinrich Frenkel in Switzerland, in order to study physical therapy of neurological patients there.

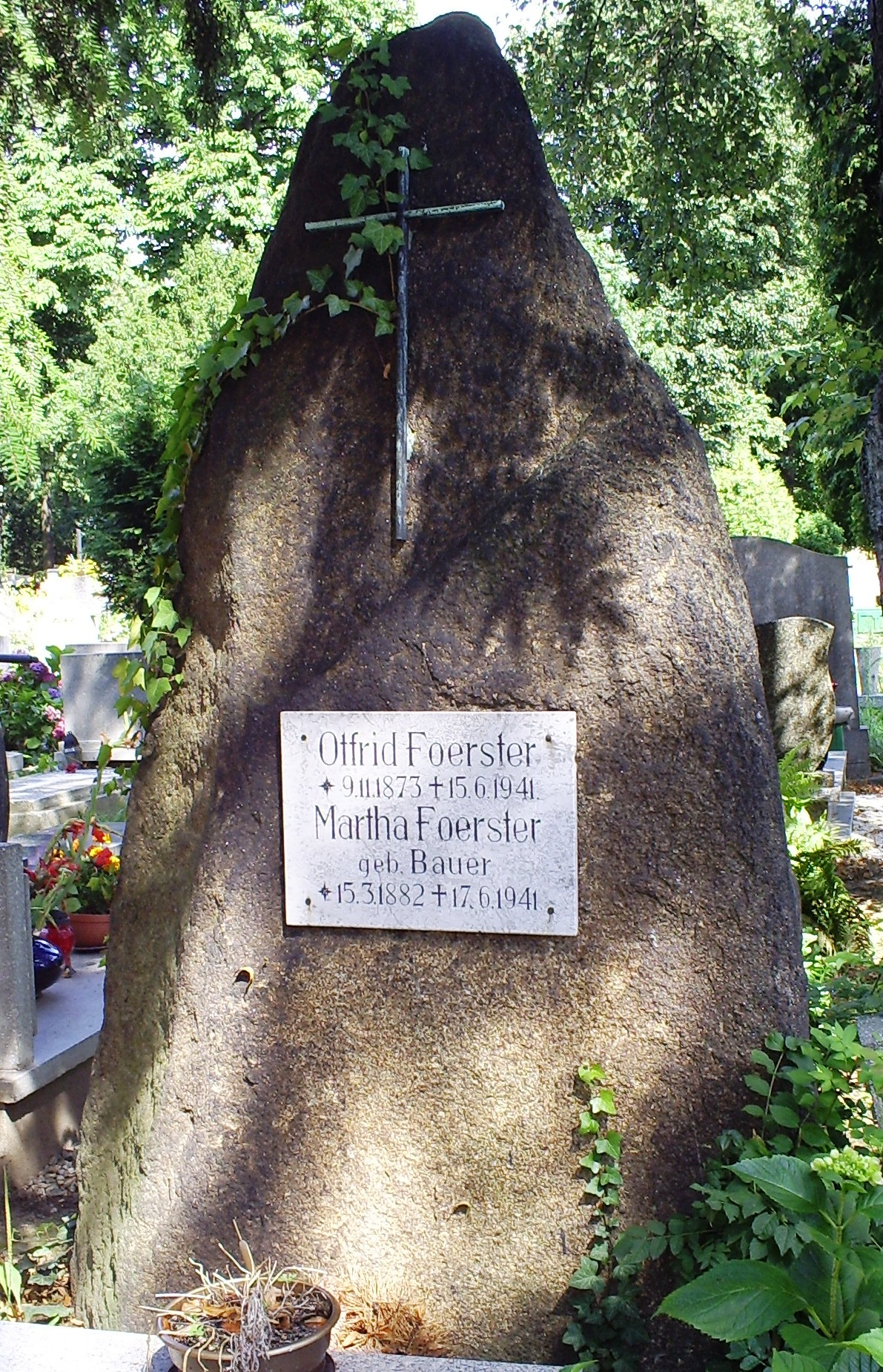
Grave of Otfrid Foerster in Wrocław (Breslau), Poland

Foerster's student years occurred in a time when neurology was starting to develop independently from internal medicine and psychiatry under the influence of, among others, Jean-Martin Charcot (1825-1893), Wilhelm Heinrich Erb, William Richard Gowers (1845-1912) and particularly Karl Wernicke, who became well known by his direction toward functional localization approaches. By cooperating with Wernike, Foerster's great interest on the anatomy of the central nervous system was excited. The two researchers published together in 1903 an anatomical atlas of the brain (Atlas des Gehirns). At the time, the several schools of neurology were focused essentially on to diagnosis; because achieving an effective therapy was hardly possible. It was Foerster who took forward the idea of using physical therapy as a new way of treating patients with neurological disturbances. From this work arose his theoretical interest on the disturbances of motor coordination in the execution of movements: this resulted in the topic of his dissertation in 1902, a work which attained a great actuality in connection with the systematic introduction of rehabilitation medicine into neurology. The involvement of spinal reflexes in the genesis of muscular spasticity suggested its possible treatment by surgical interruption of the sensory branch of the thoracic and lumbar nerves (rhizotomy), and Foerster developed in 1908 an operation to cut the posterior sensory root in order to alleviate spasticity.

In 1915 Foerster first reported on his innovative results concerning the surgical treatment of nerve damage by shot wounds, as well as other kinds of spinal cord and brain damage.

From 1922 to 1924 Foerster went to Russia as he attended Lenin after his stroke. When his most famous patient died, he was asked to suggest a scientist who could examine Lenin’s brain after the autopsy. He recommended Oskar Vogt. As the most important of all the foreign consultants, his signature appeared on all the documents about the treatment and the death of Lenin. Even if he has not cooperated with the National Socialists, his finances were restricted and his professional activities curtailed. He was put under surveillance by the german authorities. This was due to : his past connections to Lenin; the fact that his wife was partly Jewish; and the 1932's Rockefeller Foundation grant, urged by Foerster’s American friends, who funded the modern laboratory building of the Institute of Neurology. In 1934, the same year the building was built, he was deprived of his extraordinary professorship and in 1938 was relieved of the function of university professor.

In the time between the two world wars (1925 to 1935) Breslau became a place of attraction for training neurologists and neurosurgeons, particularly those coming from the United States. One of his early students coming from that part of the world was Wilder Penfield (1891-1976), who continued Foerster's work on the analysis of the cerebral cortex's command of movement and the study of epilepsy. Other students were Percival Bailey, who developed a new classification of brain tumors, and Paul Bucy, discoverer of the famous Klüver-Bucy syndrome, who made fundamental work on the organization of motor cortex, and Robert Wartenberg (1897-1956, discoverer of the Wartenberg's syndrome). Other eminent visitors were Alfred Adson, Max Peet, Edgar Kahn, John Fulton and Margaret Kennard.

One of Foerster's important methods was to use local anaesthesia to keep brain surgery patients awake. While they lay there, Foerster would poke at their brain with an electronic needle, and use the subsequent motor reactions (hand movement, finger movement, etc.) to learn about the brain's motor cortex.

He received the Hughlings Jackson Memorial Medal, which he cherished the most of all his academic honors during the second International Neurological Congress in London in 1935. But he received no single German honor between 1933 and his death.

Foerster died in 1941 in Breslau, at age 67.

== Recognition ==
Thus, Foerster's prominent position in the neurology of Germany was recognized in 1924. His prominence was at the same level of Max Nonne (1861-1959) and Foerster succeeded him as the president of the German Society of Neurology for eight years until 1932. From 1925 to 1935 Foerster brought all available analytic methods into his research, such as electrophysiology, which measures or induces electrical voltage among tissues, such as the brain. Fundamental work was developed about the electrical phenomena occurring in the reflex disturbances in the pyramidal system syndromes, such as lesions in the pallidum lesions etc. With the help of donations from the Rockefeller Foundation and the support of the State of Prussia, Foerster was able to open a new Institute of Neurological Research in 1934, which was later renamed after him (University of Breslau's Otfrid Foerster Institut Für Neurologie). Otfrid Foerster was, together with Oswald Bumke, co-editor of a monumental textbook of neurology, in which he wrote several chapters.

Described by his biographers as a giant of neurosurgery, a man of towering intelligence, kindness and charm, he commanded several languages fluently and was a prolific lecturer and writer, having published more than 300 papers and several books. His name has been honoured by the German Society of Neurosurgery by the Otfrid-Foerster-Medaille und -Gedächtnisvorlesung (Otfrid Foerster Medal and Memorial Lecture), created on August 26, 1953.

== Works ==
- Physiologie und Pathologie der Coordination, Jena 1902
- Atlas des Gehirns, herausgegeben von Karl Wernicke, Berlin 1903
- Beiträge zur Hirnchirurgie, Berlin 1909
- Die Kontrakturen bei den Erkrankungen der Pyramidenbahn, Berlin 1909
- Über die operative Behandlung spastischer Lähmungen mittels Resektion der hinteren Rückenmarkswürzel, Berlin 1911
- Foerster (1911). "Resection of the Posterior Spinal Nerve-roots in the Treatment of Gastric Crises and Spastic Paralysis". Proceedings of the Royal Society of Medicine. 4 (Surg Sect): 226–246. doi:10.1177/003591571100401548. PMC 2004804. PMID 19975563.
- Zur Pathogenese und chirurgische Behandlung der Epilepsie, Leipzig 1925
- Foerster, O (1926). "Die Pathogenese des epileptischen Krampfanfalles". Deutsche Zeitschrift für Nervenheilkunde (in German). 94 (1): 15–53. doi:10.1007/BF01652996. S2CID 12765661.
- Penfield, Wilder; Foerster, Otfrid (1930). "The structural basis of traumatic epilepsy and results of radical operation". Brain. 53 (2): 99–119. doi:10.1093/brain/53.2.99. hdl:11858/00-001M-0000-002B-0D28-A.
- Foerster, O (1933). "The dermatomes in man". Brain. 56 (1): 1–39. doi:10.1093/brain/56.1.1.
- Der Schmerz und seine operative Behandlung, Halle 1935

== Bibliography ==
- Otfrid Foerster 1873–1941: An Appreciation. J Neurophysiol 5: 1-17, 1942 Full text PDF
- Zülch, K.J. (October 1971). "Otfrid Foerster, Physician and Naturalist (1873–1941)". Med Hist. 15 (4): 412–413.
- Tan, Tze-Ching; Black, Peter (November 2001). "The Contributions of Otfrid Foerster (1873-1941) to Neurology and Neurosurgery". Neurosurgery. 49 (5): 1231–1236. doi:10.1227/00006123-200111000-00038. PMID 11846917.
- Wichert-Ana, L.; Carlotti, C.G.; Assirati, J.A.; Meneghelli, U.G.; Sakamoto, A.C.; Machado, H.R. A Brief History of the Epilepsy Surgery. e-Childrens Brain. Full text
- Greenberg, S.A. (2003). "The History of Dermatome Mapping". Arch Neurol. 60 (1): 126–131. doi:10.1001/archneur.60.1.126. PMID 12533100.
