= Pseudobulbar affect =

Episodes of uncontrollable crying or laughing

- Other names: Emotional incontinence
- Specialty: Neurology, psychiatry
- Symptoms: Episodes of uncontrollable laughing, crying, or other emotional displays that may not match the patient's mental state
- Duration: Few seconds to several minutes
- Causes: Traumatic brain injury, ALS, multiple sclerosis, dementia
- Diagnostic method: During a neurological evaluation
- Differential diagnosis: Depression, Kuru

Pseudobulbar affect (PBA), or emotional incontinence, is a neurological disorder characterized by brief, intense, uncontrollable episodes of crying or laughing. The affect is triggered by emotionally trivial or neutral stimuli that are not necessarily related to the emotional state.

PBA is a consequence of another neurological disorder or brain injury. Patients may find themselves crying uncontrollably at something that is only slightly sad, being unable to stop themselves for several minutes. Episodes may also be mood-incongruent: a patient may laugh uncontrollably when angry or frustrated, for example. Sometimes, the episodes may switch between emotional states, resulting in uncontrollable crying followed by fits of laughter.

PBA is a severe disruption of momentary emotional expression rather than the persistent, excessive, and pervasive disturbances characteristic of mood disorders. Thus, it is to be distinguished from emotional lability as it occurs with depression. PBA, emotional lability, and irritability are subsumed under the term emotional dyscontrol.

== Signs and symptoms ==
The cardinal feature of the disorder is a pathologically lowered threshold for exhibiting the behavioral response of laughter, crying, anger or all of the above. An affected individual exhibits episodes of laughter, crying, anger or a combination of these without an apparent motivating stimulus or in response to stimuli that would not have elicited such an emotional response before the onset of their underlying neurologic disorder. In some patients, the emotional response is exaggerated in intensity but is provoked by a stimulus with an emotional valence congruent with the character of the emotional display. For example, a sad stimulus provokes a pathologically exaggerated weeping response instead of a sigh, which the patient normally would have exhibited in that particular instance.

However, in some other patients, the character of the emotional display can be incongruent with, and even contradictory to, the emotional valence of the provoking stimulus or may be incited by a stimulus with no clear valence. For example, a patient may laugh in response to sad news or cry in response to stimuli with no emotional undertone, or, once provoked, the episodes may switch from laughing to crying or vice versa.

The symptoms of PBA can be severe, with persistent and unremitting episodes. Characteristics include:

- The onset can be sudden and unpredictable, and has been described by some patients as coming on like a seizure;
- The outbursts have a typical duration of a few seconds to several minutes; and,
- The outbursts may happen several times a day.

Many people with neurologic disorders exhibit uncontrollable episodes of laughing, crying, or anger that are either exaggerated or contradictory to the context in which they occur. Where patients have significant cognitive deficits (e.g., Alzheimer's disease) it can be unclear whether it is true PBA as opposed to a grosser form of emotional dysregulation, but patients with intact cognition often report the symptom as disturbing. Patients report that their episodes are at best only partially amenable to voluntary control, and unless they experience a severe change of mental status, as in traumatic brain injury, they often have insight into their problem and judge their emotional displays as inappropriate and out of character. The clinical effect of PBA can be severe, with unremitting and persistent symptoms that can be disabling to patients, and may significantly affect quality of life for caregivers.

=== Differential diagnosis ===
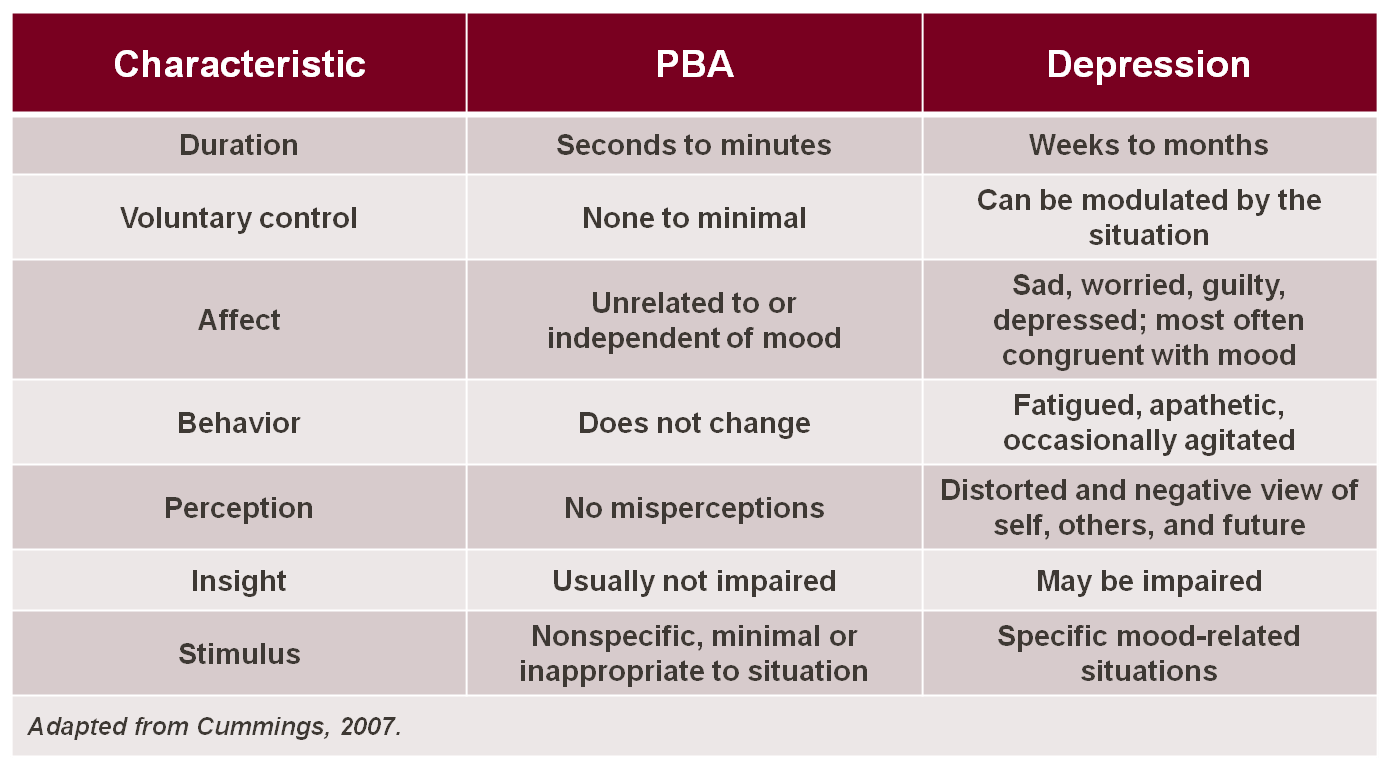
Several criteria exist to differentiate between PBA and depression.

PBA may often be misdiagnosed as clinical depression or bipolar disorder; however, many clear distinctions exist for differential diagnosis.

In depressive and bipolar disorders, crying, anger or laughter are typically indicative of mood, whereas the pathological displays of crying which occur in PBA are often in contrast to the underlying mood, or greatly in excess of the mood or eliciting stimulus. In addition, a key to differentiating depression from PBA is duration: PBA episodes are sudden, occurring in an episodic manner, while crying in depression is a more sustained presentation and closely relates to the underlying mood state. The level of control that one has over the crying, anger or other emotional displays in PBA is minimal or nonexistent, whereas for those with depression, the emotional expression (typically crying) can be modulated by the situation. Similarly, the trigger for episodes of crying in patients with PBA may be nonspecific, minimal or inappropriate to the situation, but in depression the stimulus is specific to the mood-related condition. These differences are outlined in the adjacent Table.

In some cases, depressed mood and PBA may co-exist. Since depression is one of the most common emotional changes in patients with neurodegenerative disease or post-stroke sequelae, it is often comorbid with PBA. Comorbidity implies that depression is distinct from PBA and is not necessary for, nor does it exclude, a diagnosis of PBA.

== Causes ==
The specific pathophysiology involved in this frequently debilitating condition is still under investigation; the primary pathological mechanisms of PBA remain controversial. One hypothesis, established by early researchers such as Wilson and Oppenheim, placed emphasis on the role of the corticobulbar pathways in modulating emotional expression in a top-down model, and theorized that PBA occurs when bilateral lesions in the descending corticobulbar tract cause failure of voluntary control of emotion, which leads to the disinhibition, or release, of laughing/crying centers in the brainstem. Other theories implicate the prefrontal cortex.

=== Secondary condition ===
PBA is a condition that occurs secondary to neurological disease or brain injury, and is thought to result from disruptions of neural networks that control the generation and regulation of motor output of emotions. PBA is most commonly observed in people with neurologic injuries such as traumatic brain injury (TBI) and stroke, and neurologic diseases such as dementias including Alzheimer's disease, attention deficit hyperactivity disorder (ADHD), multiple sclerosis (MS), amyotrophic lateral sclerosis (ALS), and Parkinson's disease (PD). It has been reported as a symptom of hyperthyroidism, Graves' disease, or hypothyroidism in combination with depression.

PBA has also been observed in association with a variety of other brain disorders, including brain tumors, Wilson's disease, syphilitic pseudobulbar palsy, and various encephalitides. Rarer conditions associated with PBA include gelastic epilepsy, dacrystic epilepsy, central pontine myelinolysis, olivopontinocerebellar atrophy, lipid storage diseases, chemical exposure (e.g., nitrous oxide and insecticides), fou rire prodromique, and Angelman syndrome.

It is hypothesized that these primary neurologic injuries and diseases affect chemical signaling in the brain, which in turn disrupts the neurologic pathways that control emotional expression.

=== Stroke ===
PBA is one of the most frequently reported post-stroke behavioral disorders, with a range of reported prevalence from 28% to 52%. The higher prevalence rates tend to be reported in stroke patients who are older or who have a history of prior stroke. The relationship between post-stroke depression and PBA is complicated, because the depressive syndrome also occurs with high frequency in stroke survivors. Post-stroke patients with PBA are more depressed than post-stroke patients without PBA, and the presence of a depressive syndrome may exacerbate the weeping side of PBA symptoms.

=== Multiple sclerosis ===
Recent studies suggest that approximately 10% of patients with multiple sclerosis (MS) will experience at least one episode of emotional lability. PBA is generally associated with later stages of the disease (chronic progressive phase). PBA in MS patients is associated with more severe intellectual deterioration, physical disability, and neurological disability.

=== Amyotrophic lateral sclerosis ===
A study designed specifically to survey for prevalence found that 49% of patients with amyotrophic lateral sclerosis (ALS) also had PBA. PBA does not appear to be associated with duration of ALS. It is a symptom of ALS that many patients are unaware of and do not receive information about from their physician.

=== Traumatic brain injury ===
One study of 301 consecutive cases in a clinic setting reported a 5% prevalence. PBA occurred in patients with more severe head injury, and coincided with other neurological features suggestive of pseudobulbar palsy.

The Brain Injury Association of America (BIAA) indicates that approximately 80% of survey respondents experience symptoms of PBA. Results from a recent investigation estimate the prevalence of PBA associated with traumatic brain injury to exceed more than 55% of survivors.

== Consequences ==
While not as profoundly disabling as the physical symptoms of the most common diseases that cause it (such as ALS), PBA may significantly influence individuals' social functioning and their relationships with others. Such sudden, frequent, extreme, uncontrollable emotional outbursts may lead to social withdrawal and interfere with activities of daily living, social and professional pursuits, and reduce overall healthcare. For example, patients with ALS and MS are often cognitively normal. However, the appearance of uncontrollable emotions is commonly associated with many additional neurological disorders such as Parkinson's disease, cerebral palsy, autism, epilepsy, and migraines. This may lead to avoidance of social interactions for the patient, which in turn impairs their coping mechanisms and their careers.

== Treatment ==
Education of patients, families, and caregivers is an important component of the appropriate treatment of PBA. Crying associated with PBA may be incorrectly interpreted as depression; laughter may be embarrassing, anger can be debilitating. It is therefore critical for families and caregivers to recognize the pathological nature of PBA and the reassurance that this is an involuntary syndrome that is manageable. Traditionally, antidepressants such as sertraline, fluoxetine, citalopram, nortriptyline and amitriptyline have been prescribed with some efficacy.

=== Medication ===
Dextromethorphan/quinidine is a fixed-dose combination medication, and is the first FDA-approved drug for the treatment of PBA, approved on October 29, 2010.

In the pivotal multicenter study that led to its approval, the "Objectives...[were] to evaluate the safety, tolerability, and efficacy of two different doses of AVP-923 [Dextromethorphan/quinidine combination]...when compared to placebo." The conditions and results of that study are as follows:

At one study site, a total of 326 participants received one of three dose options. "METHODS: In a 12-week randomized, double-blind trial, ALS and MS patients with clinically significant PBA" were given a twice-daily dose of one of the following:

- placebo (N=109)
- dextromethorphan hydrobromide 30 mg/quinidine sulfate 10 mg (N=110)
- Nuedexta – dextromethorphan hydrobromide 20 mg/quinidine sulfate 10 mg (N=107)

283 patients (86.8%) completed the study. The number of PBA episodes (laughing, crying or aggressive outbursts) were 47% and 49% lower (based on the trial's outcome measures), respectively, for the drug-combination options than for the placebo. The "mean CNS-LS scores" decreased by 8.2 points for both drug-combination options, vs a decrease of 5.7 points for the placebo.

Overall, the trial showed a statistically significant benefit from taking a combination of dextromethorphan and quinidine, with both dosages being safe and well tolerated. For a secondary objective measuring a participant's "perceived health status...measuring eight health concepts: vitality, physical functioning, bodily pain, general health perceptions, physical role-, emotional role-, social role functioning, and mental health," the higher dosage showed improvement, especially on measures of social functioning and mental health.

== Epidemiology ==
Prevalence estimates place the number of people with PBA between 1.5 and 2 million in the United States alone, which would be less than 1% of the U.S. population even at the high end of the estimate. Some argue that the number is probably higher and that clinicians underdiagnose PBA. However, the prevalence estimate of 2 million is based on an online survey. Self-selected computer-savvy patients in at-risk groups evaluated their own symptoms and submitted their self-diagnoses. No doctor or clinic confirmed the data. Motivation to participate could have been influenced by the presence of symptoms, which would have skewed the results. The actual prevalence could very well be quite a bit lower than estimated.

== History ==
The Expression of the Emotions in Man and Animals by Charles Darwin was published in 1872. In Chapter VI, "Special Expressions of Man: Suffering and Weeping", Darwin discusses cultural variations in the acceptability of weeping and the wide differences in individual responses to suffering. The chapter contains the following sentence:

We must not, however, lay too much stress on the copious shedding of tears by the insane, as being due to the lack of all restraint; for certain brain-diseases, as hemiplegia, brain-wasting, and senile decay, have a special tendency to induce weeping.

== Terminology ==
Historically, there have been a variety of terms used for the disorder, including pseudobulbar affect, pathological laughter and crying, emotional lability, emotionalism, emotional dysregulation, or more recently, involuntary emotional expression disorder. The term pseudobulbar (pseudo- + bulbar) came from the idea that the symptoms seemed similar to those caused by a bulbar lesion (that is, a lesion in the medulla oblongata).

Terms such as forced crying, involuntary crying, pathological emotionality, and emotional incontinence have also been used, although less frequently.

== Society and culture ==
Arthur Fleck, the central character of the 2019 film Joker, displays signs of pseudobulbar affect, and Joaquin Phoenix said he watched videos of patients with the condition as inspiration for his character's signature laugh. The aforementioned film made awareness of the condition significantly more mainstream.

== See also ==
- Affect (psychology)
- Affect display
- Witzelsucht
