= Foerster's syndrome =

Condition of compulsive punning

Foerster's syndrome is the name used by Arthur Koestler in his account of the compulsive punning first described by the German neurosurgeon Otfrid Foerster.

In 1929, Foerster was operating on a patient suffering from a tumor in the third ventricle – a small cavity deep down in the phylogenetically ancient regions of the midbrain, adjacent to structures intimately concerned with the arousal of emotions. When the surgeon began to manipulate the tumor, affecting those sensitive structures, the (conscious) patient burst into a manic flight of puns. He exhibited typical sound associations, and with every word of the operator broke into a flight of ideas. The sound of one word swiftly echoed in the sound of the next, and all of the words had something to do with knives and butchery. This gruesome humour, Koestler noted, all came "from a man tied face down to the operating table with his skull open".

== See also ==
- Witzelsucht
