= Witzelsucht =

Human neurological disorder

Witzelsucht (German: [ˈvɪtsl̩ˌzʊxt] "joking addiction") is a set of rare neurological symptoms characterized by a tendency to make puns, or tell inappropriate jokes or pointless stories in socially inappropriate situations. It makes one unable to read sarcasm.

A less common symptom is hypersexuality, the tendency to make sexual comments at inappropriate times or situations. Patients do not understand that their behavior is abnormal; therefore, they are non-responsive to others' reactions. This disorder is most commonly seen in patients with frontal lobe damage, particularly right frontal lobe tumors or trauma. The disorder remains named in accordance with its reviewed definition by German neurologist Hermann Oppenheim, its first description as the less focused moria (pathologic giddiness or lunatic mood) by German neurologist Moritz Jastrowitz, was in 1888.

== Signs and symptoms ==
=== Case studies ===
A condition rarely diagnosed, Witzelsucht has been well documented in the recent era in at least two cases:

Case #1: A 30-year-old, right-handed man was admitted to the department of neurology for irritability, inappropriate behavior, and morbid hyperphagia with obesity. His inappropriate laughter and persistent pun and joke telling was a sharp contrast to his personality as an intellectual theological scholar, known for his exceptional memory as opposed to his sense of humor. This behavior was generally prompted by environmental stimuli such as physician's rounds or blood sampling. To the patient, his behavior seemed normal, which explains why he remained nondiscriminating toward his jokes, their context, and their impression on those around him. Neurological examination revealed mild spastic left hemiparesis with minimal motor coordination and impairment of voluntary fine movements. Single-photon emission computed tomography (SPECT) showed hypoperfusion, or decreased blood flow, in the right frontoparietal area. Additionally, verbal and performance tests showed evidence of poor concentration skills, high distractibility, and difficulty with visual-spatial tasks. The patient's performance on the Wisconsin Card Sorting Test was severely impaired, suggesting frontal dysfunction.

Case #2: A 56-year-old man, KS, was admitted to the hospital with signs of a putaminal hemorrhage, including dense paralysis on the left side of his body and face, difficulty swallowing, and visual field defects on his left side. On the fifth day of hospitalization, he was alert and cooperative with no disorientation, delusion, or emotional lability. He then became euphoric and outspoken, speaking in puns and witticisms with an exaggerated smile. The content of his conversations, however, was not bizarre or random. He would work in puns and jokes while speaking his concerns about his other physical symptoms from the stroke in a coherent manner. Sometimes he would not crack a smile at something he said to make others around him laugh hysterically, while other times he could not appreciate others' jokes. During this time, KS also developed hypersexuality, using erotic words and inappropriate behavior toward the female hospital staff. Before his stroke, KS's family reported he did make jokes on occasion, but never in this bizarre manner, and never behaved impolitely to women. MRI tests showed bleeding at the right putamen, extending into the posterior and lateral portions of the right thalamus and defects in the thalamus and right basal ganglion. Another test showed deficits in recent memory, orientation, abstract thinking, drawing, and verbal fluency.

=== Altered sense of humor ===
In both case studies, patients showed an altered sense of humor, mostly in regard to producing and appreciating humor. The right hemisphere is involved with processing speed and problem solving, which plays a role in humor processing. These patients have difficulty fully interpreting a joke's content, but can recognize the importance of the form of a joke. Patients with Witzelsucht often find non sequiturs, slapstick humor, and puns funniest since these forms of humor do not require integration of content across sentences. In other words, the end of the joke is not dependent on the first part; one does not need to make a logical connection to understand humor. Patients show no change in understanding simple logic, and understand the importance of surprise in humor (hence why they choose slapstick humor instead of the "correct" punch line); however, once they have registered this surprise, they cannot connect the punch line to the body of the joke to fully appreciate the true humor behind the joke. Successful jokes require a juxtaposition of the sound and the meaning of words used to understand the punchline. However, patients with witzelsucht have difficulty connecting the two, resulting in an inability to appreciate humor.

Additionally, patients show no emotional reaction to humor, whether produced by themselves or others. This lack of responsiveness is due to dissociation between their cognitive and affective responses to humorous stimuli. That is, even when a patient understands that a joke is funny (based on quantitative brain activity), they do not respond with laughter, or even a smile. While they have grasped the cognitive basis of humor, they do not affectively respond. This is also considered a cognitive component of empathy, affecting one's ability to take the perspective of others; hence why patients often do not respond to humor produced by other people.

=== Hypersexuality ===
This symptom is much rarer than the unusual use of puns and nonresponsive sense of humor most notably seen in Witzelsucht patients. Nonetheless, patients can still exhibit hypersexuality by making sexual comments at socially inappropriate times. Some signs of this behavior include impulsivity, poor judgment, deficits in emotional regulation, excess preoccupation with sex, and cognitive rigidity (difficulty in appreciating another's emotion, inability to yield). More than likely this symptom is linked to amygdala damage that can occur during a stroke, which can also induce frontal lobe damage.

== Humor recognition in the brain ==
=== Role of the frontal lobe ===
Damage to the frontal lobe has been related to changes in personality. The frontal lobes are crucial for the development of personality, sense of self, and humor development. Anatomically, there are meaningful connections between the frontal lobes (specifically the polar and ventral/medial areas) and other brain regions related to affective-emotional responses. Early cases of Witzelsucht observed damage to the mesial-orbital region of the frontal lobe. In general, damage to this area results in puerility, disinhibition, and an inappropriate jocular affect. Subjects with damage to this part of the brain show a preference for gallows humor. The frontal lobes are also involved in processing narrative conversation and understanding abstract or indirect forms of communication, such as sarcasm. This is a critical role in humor appreciation. Subjects with damage to the right superior frontal cortex (Brodmann areas 8/9) choose punchlines which are simplistic and do not integrate content across a narrative. This region of the brain is responsible for problem-solving skills and holding information to recall during processing (i.e. working memory). Only damage to the right hemisphere of the brain, not the left, is linked to humor. Specifically, pathology in the right frontal lobe (specifically the superior and anterior regions) correlated with deficits in humor in patients as opposed to other brain regions in the right hemisphere.

One of the main roles of the right hemisphere, which is organizing and integrating information, is found in the right frontal lobe. Additionally, it is also responsible for episodic memory, which is essential in humor appreciation. A person may remember experiences in order to fully understand a joke in the current context. This remembering of personally experienced events is considered episodic memory. Appreciating humor requires integrated operations within the brain, all of which can be processed in the right frontal lobe. It has been considered a heteromodal cortex, which means that it responds to multiple stimuli, capable of interpreting internal and external sensory input. The coordination of these sensory interpretations are ideal for humor appreciation and production, one of the highest and most evolved human cognitive functions.

=== Functional behavior ===
One of the major theories of humor is the incongruity-resolution model, which considers humor appreciation as a problem-solving task. The punch-line, which can be taken out of place from the body of the text, must be detected and then connected with the lead. This logical process is an important role in the frontal lobes; therefore, damage to this area of the brain leads to difficulty connecting the start of a joke to the punch-line. In incongruity-resolution, there is more information to be integrated within the frontal lobe (i.e. when the joke makes more sense, in a somewhat logical way, the scripts within the brain can be unified better.) Patients with Witzelsucht cannot make that logical connection in incongruity-resolution jokes, hence why they communicate through nonsense humor, mostly in the form of puns and non sequiturs.

Two other components related to the frontal lobes contribute to the social behavior of a Witzelsucht patient. Previous studies have established a connection with the right hemisphere and emotional responsiveness. The specific anatomical location is still unclear, but it was shown that the right frontal operculum was most relevant in emotional gesturing. This, combined with the dissociation between cognitive and affective stimuli can explain why patients show no reaction to humor. Personality and drawing on past experiences have been shown to influence humor processing and appreciation. A person may remember past experiences in their own life in order to fully understand a joke in the current context. This remembering of personally experienced events is considered episodic memory, which is processed within the frontal lobes. Additionally, this inability to remember past experiences could also cause a person to forget what is socially appropriate; which could explain why Witzelsucht patients sometimes say hypersexual comments in public.

== Hypersexuality in the brain ==
The amygdala plays a significant role in processing emotional stimuli and producing affective responses, which in turn is utilized in social interactions. The amygdala regulates the attachment of emotional significance to corresponding sensory stimuli. Lesions in the amygdala do not disrupt a specific sexual mechanism. Instead, they disturb the emotional processing of stimuli, which causes random and/or inappropriate responses. The amygdala has a positive effect on sexual behavior by allowing the appropriate attachment of emotional significance to external sexual stimuli. Previous human studies have shown an association between temporal lobe dysfunction and altered sexual behavior. There has also been evidence of hypersexual behavior after epileptic seizures. Epileptic foci can be found on the temporal lobe, near the amygdala. It has been postulated that there is an increased likelihood that a patient would exhibit hypersexuality directly after a seizure. Due to limited cases studying the connection between witzelsucht and hypersexuality, studies concerning epileptic foci on the temporal lobe could be looked at to gain more information.

== Relation to other diseases ==
Witzelsucht can occur in the context of frontotemporal dementia, a neurological disorder resulting from degeneration of the frontal lobes and/or anterior temporal lobes. There are a range of neuropsychiatric symptoms associated with frontal lobe dementia, including progressive declines in social conduct, insight, and personal and emotional regulation and reactivity. The most common social changes that arise in patients include awkwardness, decreased propriety and manners, unacceptable physical boundaries, and/or improper verbal or physical acts. Childish, frivolous, or silly behavior is associated with damage to the right frontal, and most likely adjacent orbitofrontal lobe involvement. This can be associated with Witzelsucht, as well as moria- a similar disorder resulting in childish euphoria and cheerful excitement.

Witzelsucht is considered a disorder of mirth or humor, which is distinct from disorders of laughter. Patients with Witzelsucht are essentially insensitive to humor, but are capable of producing it while other patients excessively laugh, often at things that are not funny. The most common disorders of laughter are associated with pseudobulbar palsy, which can be caused by severe brain trauma, most commonly in the right hemisphere. Pathological laughter in this can be triggered by trivial stimuli, which could be disconnected from the underlying mood, and be combined with crying. Pathological laughter can also occur in the absence of pseudobulbar palsy. Gelastic (laughing) seizures are another neurological case of inappropriate or excessive laughter occurring in brief bursts. Treatment for these disorders can include antidepressants and antimanic agents.

== Potential treatment ==
Serotonin and norepinephrine reuptake inhibitor, venlafaxine, were given to case study KS four months after initial stroke that started symptoms of witzelsucht. Changes back to his original behavior were noticeable after daily dose of 37.5 mg of venlafaxine for two weeks. In subsequent two months, inappropriate jokes and hypersexual behavior were rarely noticed. Due to the rareness of this disorder, not much research into potential treatments has been conducted.

== See also ==
- Foerster's syndrome
- Ganser syndrome (hysterical pseudodementia) where patients are unable to appropriately answer even straightforward questions
- Pseudobulbar affect (episodes of uncontrollable crying or laughter)
