= Orbitofrontal cortex =

Region of the prefrontal cortex of the brain

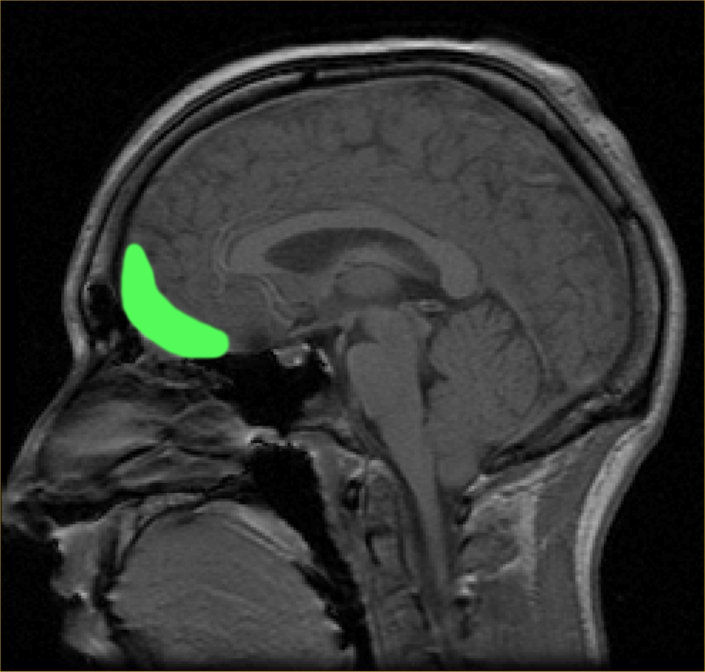
- Approximate location of the OFC shown on a sagittal MRI

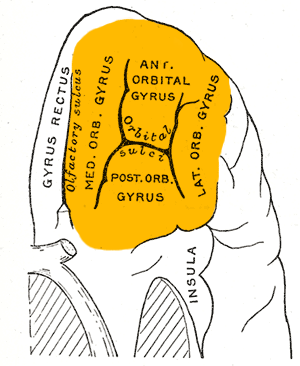
- Orbital surface of left frontal lobe (from below)

Details
- Part of: Frontal lobe

Identifiers
- Latin: cortex orbitofrontalis
- NeuroNames: 91
- NeuroLex ID: birnlex_1049
- FMA: 242003

The orbitofrontal cortex (OFC) is a prefrontal cortex region in the frontal lobes of the brain which is involved in the cognitive process of decision-making. In non-human primates it consists of the association cortex areas Brodmann area 11, 12 and 13; in humans it consists of Brodmann area 10, 11 and 47.

The OFC is functionally related to the ventromedial prefrontal cortex. Therefore, the region is distinguished due to the distinct neural connections and the distinct functions it performs. It is defined as the part of the prefrontal cortex that receives projections from the medial dorsal nucleus of the thalamus, and is thought to represent emotion, taste, smell and reward in decision-making. It gets its name from its position immediately above the orbits in which the eyes are located. Considerable individual variability has been found in the OFC of humans. A related area is found in rodents.

== Structure ==
The OFC is divided into multiple broad regions distinguished by cytoarchitecture, including Brodmann area 47/12, Brodmann area 11, Brodmann area 14, Brodmann area 13, and Brodmann area 10. Four gyri are split by a complex of sulci that most frequently resembles a "H" or a "K" pattern. Extending along the rostro-caudal axis, two sulci, the lateral and orbital sulci, are usually connected by the transverse orbital sulcus, which extends along a medial-lateral axis. Most medially, the medial orbital gyrus is separated from the gyrus rectus by the olfactory sulcus. Anteriorly, both the gyrus rectus and the medial part of the medial orbital gyrus consist of area 11(m), and posteriorly, area 14. The posterior orbital gyrus consists mostly of area 13, and is bordered medially and laterally by the anterior limbs of the medial and lateral orbital sulci. Area 11 makes up a large part of the OFC involving both the lateral parts of the medial orbital gyrus and the anterior orbital gyrus. The lateral orbital gyrus consists mostly of area 47/12. Most of the OFC is granular, although the caudal parts of area 13 and area 14 are agranular. These caudal regions, which sometimes include parts of the insular cortex, respond primarily to unprocessed sensory cues.

=== Connections ===
The connectivity of the OFC varies somewhat along a rostral-caudal axis. The caudal OFC is more heavily interconnected with sensory regions, notably receiving direct input from the pyriform cortex. The caudal OFC is also the most heavily interconnected with the amygdala. Rostrally, the OFC receives fewer direct sensory projections, and is less connected with the amygdala, but it is interconnected with the lateral prefrontal cortex and parahippocampus. The connectivity of the OFC has also been conceptualized as being composed of two networks; an orbital network composed of most of the central parts of the OFC, including most of the areas 47/12, 13, and 11; a medial network composed of the medial most and caudolateral regions of the OFC, as well as areas 24, 25 and 32 of the medial prefrontal cortex. The medial and orbital networks are sometimes referred to as the "visceromotor network" and the "sensory network", respectively.

==== Afferents ====
The OFC receives projections from multiple sensory modalities. The primary olfactory cortex, gustatory cortex, secondary somatosensory cortex, superior and inferior temporal gyrus (conveying visual information) all project to the OFC. Evidence for auditory inputs is weak, although some neurons respond to auditory stimuli, indicating an indirect projection may exist. The OFC also receives input from the medial dorsal nucleus, insular cortex, entorhinal cortex, perirhinal cortex, hypothalamus, and amygdala.

==== Efferents ====
The orbitofrontal cortex is reciprocally connected with the perirhinal and entorhinal cortices, the amygdala, the hypothalamus, and parts of the medial temporal lobe. In addition to these outputs, the OFC also projects to the striatum, including the nucleus accumbens, caudate nucleus, and ventral putamen, as well as regions of the midbrain including the periaqueductal gray, and ventral tegmental area. OFC inputs to the amygdala synapse on multiple targets, including two robust pathways to the basolateral amygdala and intercalated cells of the amygdala, as well as a weaker direct projection to the central nucleus of the amygdala.

== Function ==
Multiple functions have been ascribed to the OFC, including mediating context-specific responses, encoding contingencies in a flexible manner, encoding value, encoding inferred value, inhibiting responses, learning changes in contingency, emotional appraisal, altering behavior through somatic markers, driving social behavior, and representing state spaces. While most of these theories explain certain aspects of electrophysiological observations and lesion related changes in behavior, they often fail to explain, or are contradicted by other findings.

One proposal that explains the variety of OFC functions is that the OFC encodes state spaces, or the discrete configuration of internal and external characteristics associated with a situation and its contingencies. For example, the proposal that the OFC encodes economic value may be a reflection of the OFC encoding task state value. The representation of task states could also explain the proposal that the OFC acts as a flexible map of contingencies, as a switch in task state would enable the encoding of new contingencies in one state, with the preservation of old contingencies in a separate state, enabling switching contingencies when the old task state becomes relevant again. The representation of task states is supported by electrophysiological evidence demonstrating that the OFC responds to a diverse array of task features, and is capable of rapidly remapping during contingency shifts. The representation of task states may influence behavior through multiple potential mechanisms. For example, the OFC is necessary for ventral tegmental area (VTA) neurons to produce a dopaminergic reward prediction error, and the OFC may encode expectations for computation of RPEs in the VTA.

Specific functions have been ascribed to subregions of the OFC. The lateral OFC has been proposed to reflect potential choice value, enabling fictive (counterfactual) prediction errors to potentially mediate switching choices during reversal, extinction and devaluation. Optogenetic activation of the lOFC enhances goal directed over habitual behavior, possibly reflecting increased sensitivity to potential choices and therefore increased switching. The mOFC, on the other hand, has been proposed to reflect relative subjective value. In rodents, a similar function has been ascribed to the mOFC, encoding action value in a graded fashion, while the lOFC has been proposed to encode specific sensory features of outcomes. The lOFC has also been proposed to encode stimulus outcome associations, which are then compared by value in the mOFC. Meta analysis of neuroimaging studies in humans reveals that a medial-lateral valence gradient exists, with the medial OFC responding most often to reward, and the lateral OFC responding most often to punishment. A posterior-anterior abstractness gradient was also found, with the posterior OFC responding to more simple rewards, and the anterior OFC responding more to abstract rewards. Similar results were reported in a meta-analysis of studies on primary versus secondary rewards.

The OFC and basolateral amygdala (BLA) are highly interconnected, and their connectivity is necessary for devaluation tasks. Damage to either the BLA or the OFC before, but only the OFC after devaluation, impairs performance. While the BLA only responds to cues predicting salient outcomes in a graded fashion in accordance with value, the OFC responds to both value and the specific sensory attributes of cue-outcome associations. While OFC neurons that, early in learning, respond to outcome receipt normally transfer their response to the onset of cues that predict the outcome, damage to the BLA impairs this form of learning.

The posterior orbitofrontal cortex (pOFC) is connected to the amygdala via multiple paths that are capable of both upregulating and downregulating autonomic nervous system activity. Tentative evidence suggests that the neuromodulator dopamine plays a role in mediating the balance between the inhibitory and excitatory pathways, with a high dopamine state driving autonomic activity.

It has been suggested that the medial OFC is involved in making stimulus-reward associations and the reinforcement of behavior, while the lateral OFC is involved in stimulus-outcome associations and the evaluation and possibly reversal of behavior. Activity in the lateral OFC is found, for example, when subjects encode new expectations about punishment and social reprisal.

The mid-anterior OFC has been found to consistently track subjective pleasure in neuroimaging studies. A hedonic hotspot has been discovered in the anterior OFC, which is capable of enhancing liking response to sucrose. The OFC is also capable of biasing the affective responses induced by α-amino-3-hydroxy-5-methyl-4-isoxazolepropionic acid (AMPA) antagonism in the nucleus accumbens towards appetitive responses.

The OFC is capable of modulating aggressive behavior via projections to interneurons in the amygdala that inhibit glutaminergic projections to the ventromedial hypothalamus.

=== Electrophysiology ===
Neurons in the OFC respond both to primary reinforcers, and to cues that predict rewards across multiple sensory domains. The evidence for responses to visual, gustatory, somatosensory, and olfactory stimuli is robust, but evidence for auditory responses is weaker. In a subset of OFC neurons, neural responses to rewards or reward cues are modulated by individual preference and by internal motivational states such as hunger. A fraction of neurons that respond to sensory cues predicting a reward are selective for reward, and exhibit reversal behavior when cue outcome relationships are swapped. Neurons in the OFC also exhibit responses to the absence of an expected reward and punishment. Another population of neurons exhibits responses to novel stimuli and can "remember" familiar stimuli for up to a day.

During cued reward or cued instrumental reward tasks, neurons in the OFC exhibit three general patterns of firing; firing in response to cues: firing before reward receipt; firing in response to reward receipt. In contrast to the medial prefrontal cortex and striatum, OFC neurons do not exhibit firing mediated by movement. Their reward-predictive responses are, however, shaped by attention: when shifting attention between two alternatives, the same OFC population will represent positively the value of a currently attended item, but negatively the value of the unattended item. The encoding of reward magnitude is also flexible, and takes into account the relative values of present rewards.

=== Humans ===
The human OFC is among the least-understood regions of the human brain. It has been proposed that the OFC is involved in sensory integration, in representing the affective value of reinforcers, and in decision-making and expectation. In particular, the OFC seems to be important in signaling the expected rewards/punishments of an action given the particular details of a situation. In doing this, the brain is capable of comparing the expected reward/punishment with the actual delivery of reward/punishment, thus, making the OFC critical for adaptive learning. This is supported by research in humans, non-human primates, and rodents.

== Psychiatric disorders ==
The orbitofrontal cortex has been implicated in borderline personality disorder, schizophrenia, major depressive disorder, bipolar disorder, obsessive-compulsive disorder, addiction, post-traumatic stress disorder, autism, and panic disorder. Although neuroimaging studies have provided evidence for dysfunction in a wide variety of psychiatric disorders, the enigmatic nature of the OFCs role in behavior complicates the understanding of its role in the pathophysiology of psychiatric disorders. The function of the OFC is not known, but its anatomical connections with the ventral striatum, amygdala, hypothalamus, hippocampus, and periaqueductal grey support a role in mediating reward and fear related behaviors.

=== Obsessive–compulsive disorder ===
Meta-analyses of neuroimaging studies in obsessive–compulsive disorder (OCD) report hyperactivity in areas generally considered to be part of the orbitofrontal segment of the cortico-basal ganglia-thalamo-cortical loop, such as the caudate nucleus, thalamus and orbitofrontal cortex. OCD has been proposed to reflect a positive feedback loop due to mutual excitation of the OFC and subcortical structures. While the OFC is usually overactive during symptom provocation tasks, cognitive tasks usually elicit hypoactivity of the OFC; This may reflect a distinction between emotional and non-emotional tasks, lateral and medial OFC, or simply just inconsistent methodologies.

=== Addiction ===
Animal models and cell-specific manipulations in relation to drug-seeking behavior implicate dysfunction of the OFC in addiction. Substance use disorders are associated with a variety of deficits related to flexible goal-directed behavior and decision-making. These deficits overlap with symptoms related to OFC lesions, and are also associated with reduced orbitofrontal grey matter, resting state hypometabolism, and blunted OFC activity during tasks involving decision-making or goal-directed behavior. In contrast to resting state and decision-related activity, cues associated with drugs evoke robust OFC activity that correlates with craving. Rodent studies also demonstrate that lOFC to BLA projections are necessary for cue-induced reinstatement of self-administration. These findings are all congruent with the role that the OFC plays in encoding the outcomes associated with certain stimuli. The progression towards compulsive substance abuse may reflect a shift between model-based decision-making, where an internal model of future outcomes guides decisions, to model free learning, where decisions are based on reinforcement history. Model-based learning involves the OFC and is flexible and goal-directed, while model-free learning is more rigid; as a shift to more model-free behavior due to dysfunction in the OFC, like that produced by drug misuse, could underlie drug-seeking habits.

=== Behavioral disorders ===
Conduct disorder is associated with both structural abnormalities and functional abnormalities during affective tasks. Abnormalities in OFC structure, activity, and functional connectivity have all been observed in association with aggression.

=== Affective disorders ===
Neuroimaging studies have found abnormalities in the OFC in MDD and bipolar disorder. Consistent with the medial/reward and lateral/punishment gradient found in neuroimaging studies, some neuroimaging studies have observed elevated lateral OFC activity in depression, as well as reduced interconnectivity of the medial OFC, and enhanced interconnectivity in the lateral OFC. Hypoactivity of the lateral OFC has been frequently observed in bipolar disorder, in particular during manic episodes.

== Research ==
=== Imaging ===
Using functional magnetic resonance imaging (fMRI) to image the human OFC is a challenge, because this brain region is in proximity to the air-filled sinuses. This means that artifact errors can occur in the signal processing, causing, for example, geometric distortions that are common when using echo-planar imaging (EPI) at higher magnetic field strengths. Extra care is therefore recommended for obtaining a good signal from the orbitofrontal cortex, and a number of strategies have been devised, such as automatic shimming at high static magnetic field strengths.

=== Rodents ===
In rodents, the OFC is entirely agranular or dysgranular. The OFC is divided into ventrolateral (VLO), lateral (LO), medial (MO) and dorsolateral (DLO) regions. Using highly specific techniques to manipulate circuitry, such as optogenetics, the OFC has been implicated in OCD like behaviors, and in the ability to use latent variables in decision-making task.

== Clinical significance ==
=== Damage ===
Destruction of the OFC through acquired brain injury typically leads to a pattern of disinhibited behaviour. Examples include swearing excessively, hypersexuality, poor social interaction, compulsive gambling, drug use (including alcohol and tobacco), and poor empathising ability. Disinhibited behaviour by patients with some forms of frontotemporal dementia is thought to be caused by degeneration of the OFC.

=== Disruption ===
When OFC connections are disrupted, a number of cognitive, behavioral, and emotional consequences may arise. Research supports that the main disorders associated with dysregulated OFC connectivity/circuitry center around decision-making, emotion regulation, impulsive control, and reward expectation. A recent multi-modal human neuroimaging study shows disrupted structural and functional connectivity of the OFC with the subcortical limbic structures (e.g., amygdala or hippocampus) and other frontal regions (e.g., dorsal prefrontal cortex or anterior cingulate cortex) correlates with abnormal OFC affect (e.g., fear) processing in clinically anxious adults.

One clear extension of problems with decision-making is drug addiction/substance dependence, which can result from disruption of the striato-thalamo-orbitofrontal circuit. Attention deficit hyperactivity disorder (ADHD) have also been implicated in dysfunction of neural reward circuitry controlling motivation, reward, and impulsivity, including OFC systems. Other disorders of executive functioning and impulse control may be affected by OFC circuitry dysregulation, such as obsessive–compulsive disorder and trichotillomania.

Some dementias are also associated with OFC connectivity disruptions. The behavioral variant of frontotemporal dementia is associated with neural atrophy patterns of white and gray matter projection fibers involved with OFC connectivity. Finally, some research suggests that later stages of Alzheimer's disease can be impacted by altered connectivity of OFC systems.

=== Orbitofrontal epilepsy ===
Orbitofrontal epilepsy is rare, but does occur. The presentation of OFC epilepsy is fairly diverse, although common characteristics include sleep-related symptoms, automatisms, and hypermotor symptoms. One review reported that auras were generally not common or nonspecific, while another reported that OFC epilepsy was associated with auras involving somatosensory phenomena and fear.

=== Assessment ===
==== Visual discrimination test ====
The visual discrimination test has two components. In the first component, "reversal learning", participants are presented with one of two pictures, A and B. They learn that they will be rewarded if they press a button when picture A is displayed, but punished if they press the button when picture B is displayed. Once this rule has been established, the rule swaps. In other words, it is now correct to press the button for picture B, not picture A. Most healthy participants pick up on this rule reversal almost immediately, but patients with OFC damage continue to respond to the original pattern of reinforcement, although they are now being punished for persevering with it. Rolls et al. noted that this pattern of behaviour is particularly unusual given that the patients reported that they understood the rule.

The second component of the test is "extinction". Again, participants learn to press the button for picture A, but not for picture B. However, this time, instead of the rules reversing, the rule changes altogether. Now the participant will be punished for pressing the button in response to either picture. The correct response is not to press the button at all, but people with OFC dysfunction find it difficult to resist the temptation to press the button despite being punished for it.

==== Iowa gambling task ====
A simulation of real-life decision-making, the Iowa gambling task is widely used in cognition and emotion research. Participants are presented with four virtual decks of cards on a computer screen. They are told that each time they choose a card they stand to win some game money. They are told that the aim of the game is to win as much money as possible. Every so often, however, when they choose a card they will lose some money. The task is meant to be opaque. That is, participants are not meant to consciously work out the rule, and they are supposed to choose cards based on their "gut reaction." Two of the decks are "bad decks", which means that, over a long enough time, they will make a net loss; the other two decks are "good decks" and will make a net gain over time.

Most healthy participants sample cards from each deck, and after about 40 or 50 selections are fairly good at sticking to the good decks. Patients with OFC dysfunction, however, continue to perseverate with the bad decks, sometimes even though they know that they are losing money overall. Concurrent measurement of galvanic skin response shows that healthy participants show a "stress" reaction to hovering over the bad decks after only 10 trials, long before the conscious sensation that the decks are bad. By contrast, patients with OFC dysfunction never develop this physiological reaction to impending punishment. Bechara and his colleagues explain this in terms of the somatic marker hypothesis. The Iowa gambling task is currently being used by a number of research groups using fMRI to investigate which brain regions are activated by the task in healthy volunteers as well as clinical groups with conditions such as schizophrenia and obsessive compulsive disorder.

The faux pas test is a series of vignettes recounting a social occasion during which someone said something that should not have been said, or an awkward occurrence. The participant's task is to identify what was said that was awkward, why it was awkward, how people would have felt in reaction to the faux pas and to a factual control question. Although first designed for use in people on the autism spectrum, the test is also sensitive to patients with OFC dysfunction, who cannot judge when something socially awkward has happened despite appearing to understand the story perfectly well.

== Additional images ==
Orbital gyrus shown in red

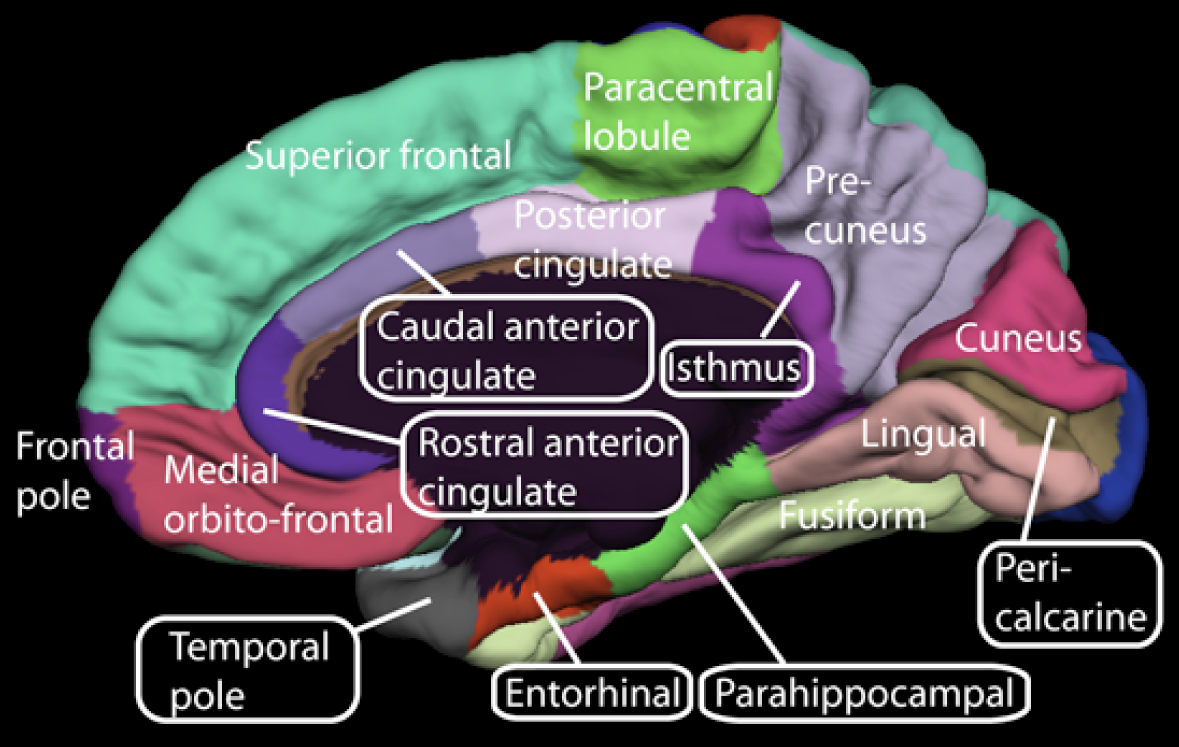
Medial surface of cerebral cortex - gyri

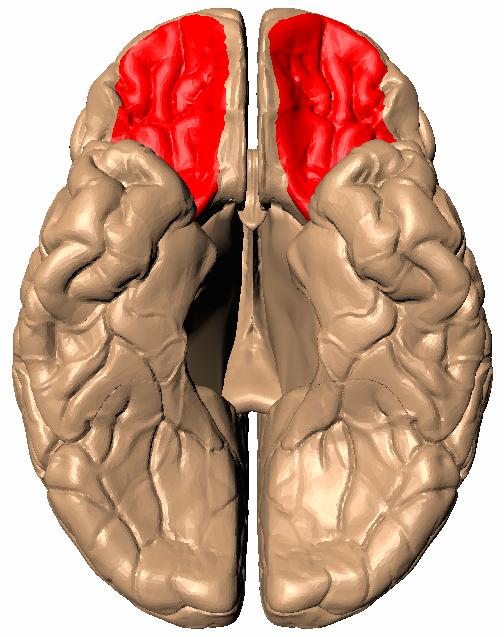
Basal surface of cerebrum. Orbital gyrus shown in red.

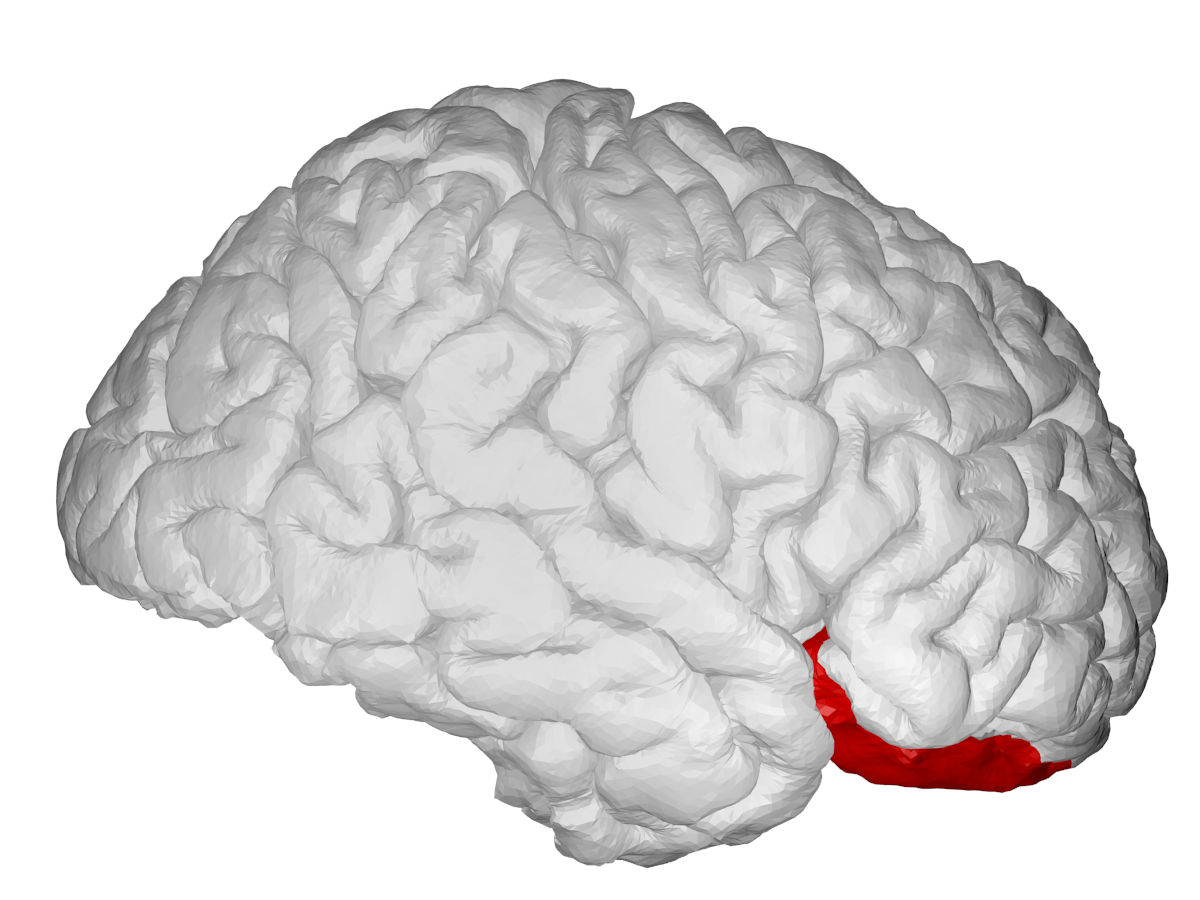
Lateral orbitofrontal cortex

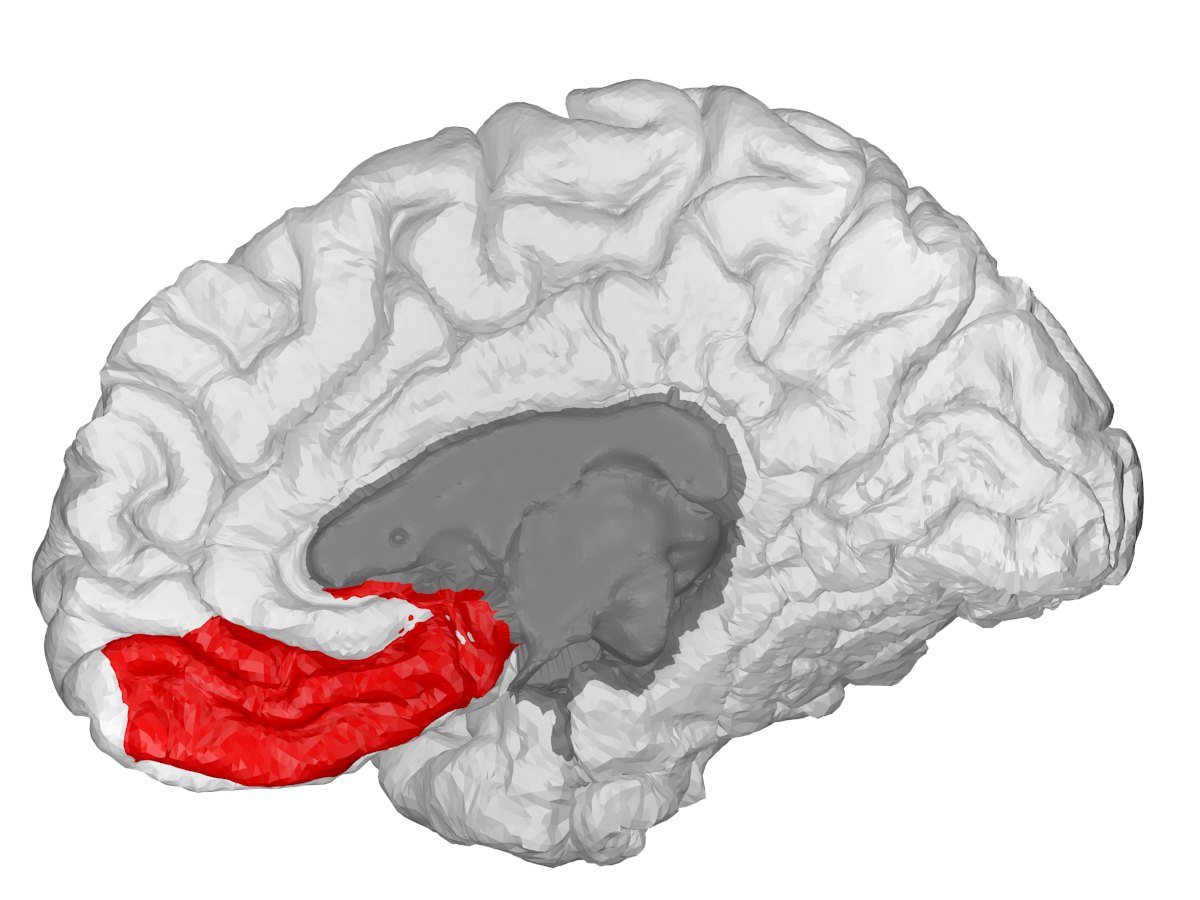
Medial orbitofrontal cortex, inner slice view

3D visualization of the orbitofrontal cortex in an average human brain

Orbitofrontal cortex highlighted in green on coronal T1 MRI images

Orbitofrontal cortex highlighted in green on sagittal T1 MRI images

Orbitofrontal cortex highlighted in green on transversal T1 MRI images

== See also ==
- Reward system
- Witzelsucht
