= Ventromedial prefrontal cortex =

Part of the prefrontal cortex

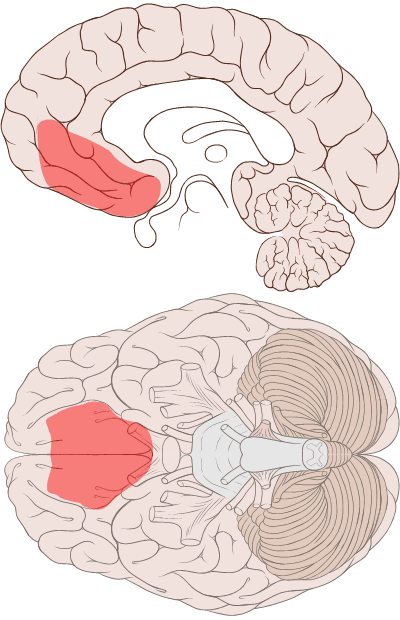
- Ventromedial prefrontal cortex shown on medial and ventral views of the brain, reflecting approximate location of damage in patients with decision making deficits.

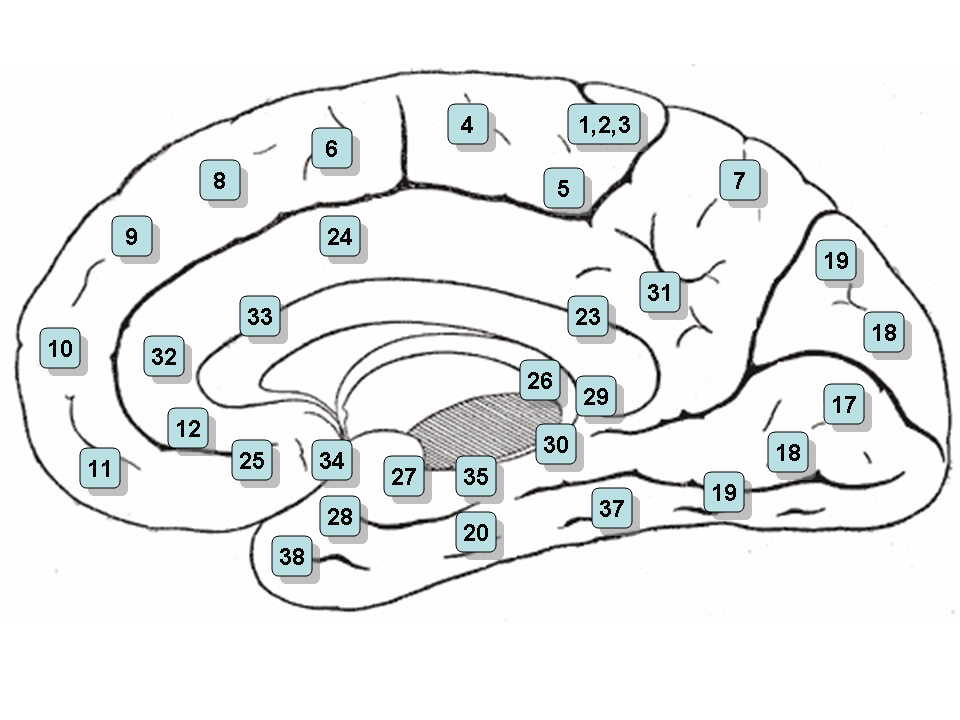
- Medial surface of the brain with Brodmann's areas numbered.

Details

Identifiers
- Latin: cortex praefrontalis ventromedialis

The ventromedial prefrontal cortex (vmPFC) is a part of the prefrontal cortex in the mammalian brain. The ventral medial prefrontal is located in the frontal lobe at the bottom of the cerebral hemispheres and is implicated in the processing of risk and fear, as it is critical in the regulation of amygdala activity in humans. It also contributes to the inhibition of emotional responses, and in the cognitive processes of decision-making, self-control, and the evaluation of morality.

== Anatomy ==
While the ventromedial prefrontal cortex does not have a universally agreed on demarcation, in most sources, it is equivalent to the ventromedial reward network of Öngür and Price. This network includes Brodmann areas 10, 14, 25, and 32, as well as portions of Brodmann areas 11, 12, and 13. However, not all sources agree on the boundaries of the area. Different researchers use the term ventromedial prefrontal cortex differently. Sometimes, the term is saved for the area above the medial orbitofrontal cortex, while at other times, 'ventromedial prefrontal cortex' is used to describe a broad area in the lower (ventral) central (medial) region of the prefrontal cortex, of which the medial orbitofrontal cortex constitutes the lowermost part. This latter, broader area, corresponds to the area damaged in patients with decision-making impairments investigated by António Damásio and colleagues (see diagram, and below).

The ventromedial prefrontal cortex is connected to and receives input from the ventral tegmental area, amygdala, the temporal lobe, the olfactory system, and the dorsomedial thalamus. It, in turn, sends signals to many different brain regions including; The temporal lobe, amygdala, the lateral hypothalamus, the hippocampal formation, the cingulate cortex, and certain other regions of the prefrontal cortex. This huge network of connections affords the vmPFC the ability to receive and monitor large amounts of sensory data and to affect and influence a plethora of other brain regions, particularly the amygdala.

== Function ==
Functional differences between the orbitofrontal and ventromedial areas of the pre-frontal cortex have not yet been clearly established, although the areas of the ventromedial cortex superior to the orbitofrontal cortex are much less associated with social functions and more with pure emotion regulation. Research in developmental neuroscience also suggested that neural networks in the ventromedial prefrontal cortex are rapidly developing during adolescence and young adulthood supporting emotion regulation through the amygdala, being associated with a decrease in cortisol levels.
It should also be noted that damage to the vmPFC can promote higher amygdala activity. There are only a few reports of people with early-onset vmPFC damage during childhood, but these individuals tend to have severe antisocial behavior and impaired moral judgment. Compared to individuals with damage later in life, their behavior pattern is similar but more severe. It is also considered central to the physiology of anxiety and mood disorders. However, the precise mechanisms by which vmPFC contributes to affective processing are not fully understood.

=== Decision making ===
Patients with bilateral lesions of the vmPFC develop severe impairments in personal and social decision-making even though most of their intellectual ability is preserved. For instance, they have difficulties in choosing between options with uncertain outcomes, whether the uncertainty is in the form of a risk or of an ambiguity. After their lesion, these patients have an impaired capacity to learn from their mistakes, making the same decisions again and again even though they lead to negative consequences. These patients choose alternatives that give immediate rewards, but seem to be blind to the future consequences of their actions. However, the underlying mechanisms of this behavior are not yet fully understood.

A lesion-comparison study reported that the vmPFC contributes to linking choices with anticipated counterfactual emotions that guide future decisions, whereas lateral orbitofrontal cortex (lOFC) relates more to experienced regret; vmPFC damage also reduced sensitivity to differences in expected value during choice. A review across human and macaque studies concludes that vmPFC/medial OFC supports evaluation and value-guided decision making (including maintaining a successful choice across decisions), whereas lOFC supports credit assignment linking specific stimuli to outcomes. Earlier fMRI work also found recruitment of medial orbitofrontal/vmPFC regions when participants had to guess under uncertainty, with engagement scaling with the complexity of probabilistic contingencies.

Damage to the ventromedial prefrontal cortex (especially in the right hemisphere) has been connected with deficits in detecting irony, sarcasm, and deception. Subjects with damage in this area have been found to be more easily influenced by misleading advertising. This has been attributed to a disruption of a "false tagging mechanism" which provides doubt and skepticism of new beliefs.

People with damage to the ventromedial prefrontal cortex still retain the ability to consciously make moral judgments without error, but only in hypothetical situations presented to them. They are severely impaired in making personal and social decisions. There is a gap in reasoning when applying the same moral principles to similar situations in their own lives. The result is that people make decisions that are inconsistent with their self professed moral values. People with early damage to the ventromedial prefrontal cortex are more likely to endorse self-serving actions that break moral rules or cause harm to others. This is especially true for patients whose damage occurred the earliest in life.

Emotions and an understanding of social norms are used to provide reasoning of the moral nature on our behaviors, beliefs, and the people around us. The vmPFC works as the neural basis in allowing emotion to influence moral judgement. In functional imaging studies, increased activity in the vmPFC is associated with thinking of these personal moral situations, while making harmless decisions does not. Patients with vmPFC lesions made the same decision in impersonal and personal dilemmas. Dysfunction of the vmPFC causes failure in using correct moral emotion, which explains why these patients showed less emotional responses when facing these dilemmas.

=== Regulation of emotion ===
The vmPFC plays an important role in regulating and inhibiting our response to emotions. VmPFC seems to use our emotional reactions to model our behavior and control emotional reactions in certain social situations. The inputs of the vmPFC provide it with information from the environment and the plans of the frontal lobe, and its outputs allow the vmPFC to control different physiological responses and behaviors. The role of the vmPFC is especially highlighted in people with damage to this region. A damaged vmPFC causes impairments of behavioral control and decision making, consequences which are rooted in emotional dysregulation.

The first and most famous case of someone with defects to this region was Phineas Gage, a railroad construction foreman who had his vmPFC bilaterally destroyed in an accident in 1848. Before his accident, Gage was described as “serious, industrious and energetic. Afterward he became childish, irresponsible, and thoughtless of others.” Another patient with vmPFC damage wasted away his life savings on foolish investments and failed to make appropriate decisions in his personal life. In patients with vmPFC damage, evidence shows that there is a correlation between emotional disregulation and dysfunction in real world competencies.

The amygdala plays a significant role in instigating the emotional reactions associated with anger and violence. With the vmPFC’s outputs to the amygdala, the vmPFC plays a part in preventing such behavior. Evidence has shown that impulsive murderers have decreased activity in the prefrontal cortex and increased activity in subcortical areas such as the amygdala. This imbalance can enhance actions that are created by negative emotions and limit the ability of the prefrontal cortex to control these emotions. Lower activation in the prefrontal cortex is also correlated with antisocial behavior. The dysfunction of the ventromedial cortex seems to, in part, be caused by lower levels of serotonin release.

The vmPFC also is involved in courage. In experiments with participants allowing snakes to come near or away from them, acts of courage correlated with activation in the vmPFC, specifically the subgenual anterior cingulate cortex.

Activation of the vmPFC is associated with successful suppression of emotional responses to a negative emotional signal. Patients with vmPFC lesions show defects both in emotional response and emotion regulation. Their emotional responsiveness is generally diminished and they show markedly reduced social emotions such as compassion, shame and guilt. These are emotions that are closely associated with moral values. Patients also exhibit poorly regulated anger and frustration tolerance in certain circumstances.

Patients with focal lesions in the vmPFC show personality changes such as lack of empathy, irresponsibility, and poor decision making. These traits are similar to psychopathic personality traits. In addition, a correlation between individuals with a history of physical violence and decreased grey matter density in the vmPFC has been evidenced. Lesions to the vmPFC are associated with resistance to depression, whereas lesions to the dorsolateral PFC is associated with vulnerability to depression.

The right half of the ventromedial prefrontal cortex was associated with regulating the interaction of cognition and affect in the production of empathic responses. Hedonic (pleasure) responses were also associations to orbitofrontal cortex activity level by Morten Kringelbach. This finding contributes findings suggesting ventromedial prefrontal cortex being associated with preference judgement, possibly assigning the ventromedial prefrontal cortex a key role in constructing one's self. fMRI scans have found that the vmPFC is active when people think about themselves. There are cultural differences in the use of this region based on cultural differences in self-perception. Chinese subjects who think of the self in relation to the community have been found to utilize the vmPFC when thinking about their mothers, whereas American subjects do not.

Studies with post-traumatic stress disorder (PTSD) also supported the idea that the ventromedial prefrontal cortex is an important component for reactivating past emotional associations and events, therefore essentially mediating pathogenesis of PTSD. Dysfunction of the vmPFC has also been identified as playing a role in PTSD-affected parents' response to their own children's mental states. Treatments geared to the activation of the ventromedial prefrontal cortex were therefore suggested for individuals and parent-child relationships affected by PTSD. The right half of the ventrolateral prefrontal cortex, being active during emotion regulation, was activated when participants were offered an unfair offer in a scenario. Specific deficits in reversal learning and decision-making have led to the hypothesis that the ventromedial prefrontal cortex is a major locus of dysfunction in the mild stages of the behavioral variant of frontotemporal dementia. A study of patients with lesions in the right vmPFC showed a loss of empathy and theory of mind, showing that the brain regions is directly involved in empathy and mentalizing.

The capacity for mature defense mechanisms such as intellectualization, compensation, reaction formation, and isolation has been tied to proper functioning of the right ventromedial prefrontal cortex, while more primitive defense mechanisms such as projection, splitting, verbal denial, and fantasy have been found to rely on other regions, primarily in the left hemisphere.

=== Somatic marker hypothesis ===
One particularly notable theory of vmPFC function is the somatic marker hypothesis, accredited to António Damásio. By this hypothesis, the vmPFC has a central role in adapting somatic markers—emotional associations, or associations between mental objects and visceral (bodily) feedback—for use in natural decision making. This account also gives the vmPFC a role in moderating emotions and emotional reactions because whether the vmPFC decides the markers are positive or negative affects the appropriate response in a particular situation. However, a critical review of this hypothesis concluded that there is a need for additional empirical data to support the somatic marker theory.

=== Extinction ===
Another role that the vmPFC plays is in the process of extinction, the gradual weakening and eventual cessation of a conditioned response, as studies have shown increased activation of the vmPFC after extinction training. The specific role played by the vmPFC concerning extinction is not well understood, but it is believed that it plays a necessary role in the recall of extinction learning after a long period of time. Studies show that it aids in the consolidation of extinction learning. A separate study has implicated the correlation between the cortical thickness of the vmPFC and the degree of extinction memory. Patients with larger vmPFCs tended to have lower responses to the extinct conditioned stimulus, therefore suggesting a superior extinction memory. In general, the ventromedial prefrontal cortex plays a major role in the later stages of memory consolidation.

=== Gender specific social cues ===
Ventromedial prefrontal cortex lesions were also associated with a deficit in processing gender specific social cues. One experiment tested the ability of patients with vmPFC lesions to categorize gender-specific names, attributes, and attitudes compared to patients with dorsolateral prefrontal cortex lesions and control subjects. Whereas the patients with dorsolateral prefrontal cortex lesions performed similarly to the control subjects on tests indicating gender stereotypes, patients with ventromedial prefrontal cortex lesions demonstrated impaired stereotypic social knowledge.

=== Cocaine abuse ===
Frequent cocaine users have been shown to have lower than normal activity in the ventromedial prefrontal cortex. When asked to perform certain tasks that rely heavily on activation of this area of the brain, the cocaine users perform worse and have less prefrontal cortex activation than the control subjects. The quantity of cocaine used was found to be inversely proportional to the level of activation.

The prefrontal cortex is also physically affected by cocaine use. Chronic use has been shown to lead to a decrease in the amount of gray matter in the ventromedial prefrontal cortex. The decrease in gray matter and effect on behavior is analogous to a person having lesions throughout their medial prefrontal cortex. Specifically, the pyramidal cells of the ventromedial prefrontal cortex are known to be linked with drug seeking behaviors. Both an increased and decreased level of activity in these pyramidal cells has shown to lead to extinction of cocaine-seeking behaviors depending on when the activation takes place. Inactivation of these cells was needed to inhibit cocaine-seeking behavior after a longer duration of time, whereas activation was required to reduce the behavior soon after using cocaine.
