= C20H25N3O =

The molecular formula C_{20}H_{25}N_{3}O may refer to:

- Iso-LSD
- l-LSD
- l-Iso-LSD
- JRT (drug)
- Lysergic acid 2-butyl amide (LSB)
- Lysergic acid tert-butylamide (LAtB)
- Lysergic acid diethylamide (LSD)
- Methylisopropyllysergamide
- Lysergic acid butylamide
- Prodigiosin
- LY-301317
