= Lysergic acid diethylamide (disambiguation) =

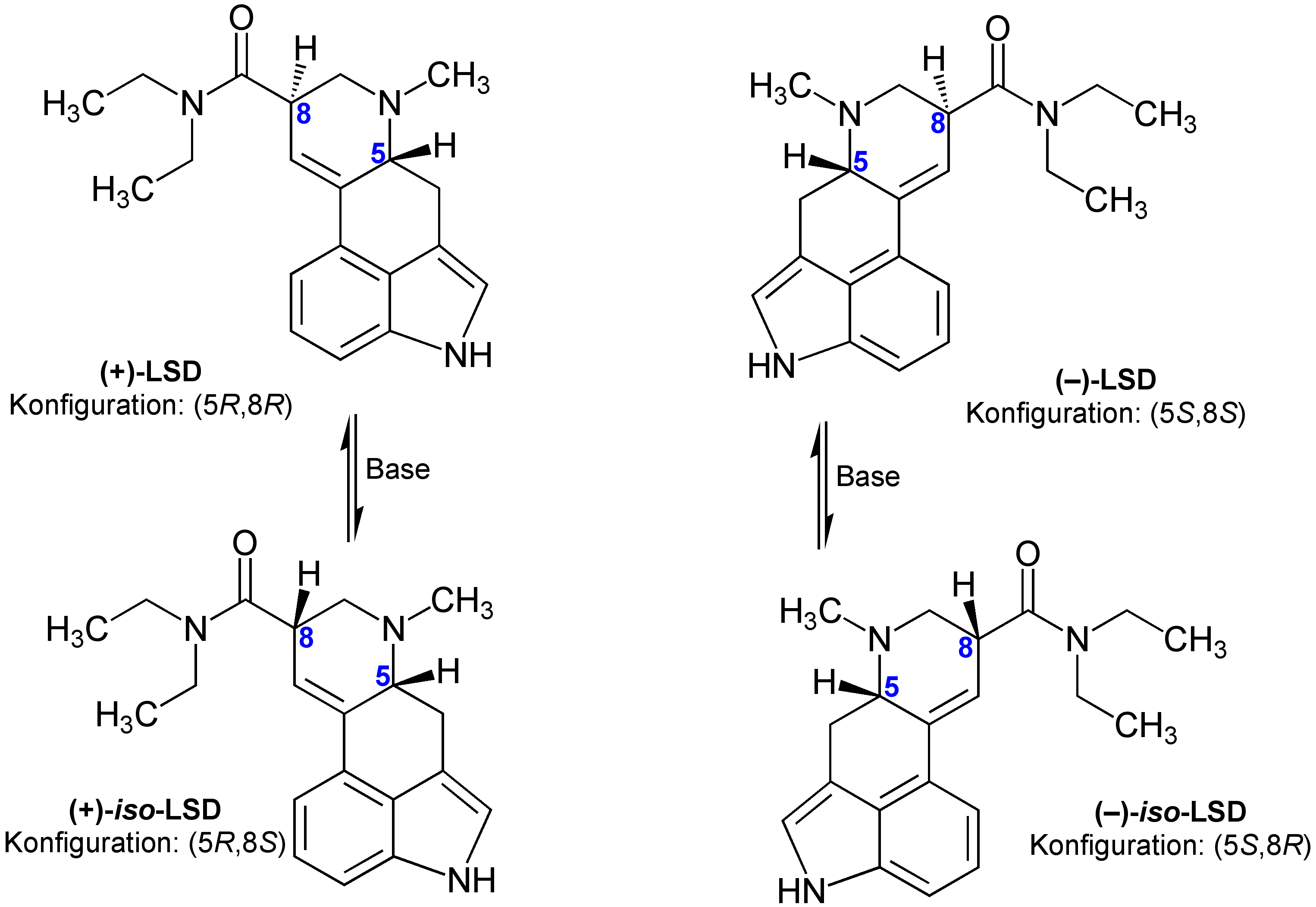
Chemical structures of the four possible stereoisomers of the LSD molecule.

Lysergic acid diethylamide (LSD), a molecule with two chiral centers and four possible stereoisomers, may refer to:

- LSD (d-LSD, (+)-LSD, or (5R,8R)-LSD) – the active stereoisomer and psychedelic drug
- Iso-LSD (d-iso-LSD, (+)-iso-LSD, or (5R-8S)-LSD) – an inactive stereoisomer
- l-LSD ((–)-LSD or (5S,8S)-LSD) – an inactive stereoisomer
- l-Iso-LSD ((–)-iso-LSD or (5S,8R)-iso-LSD) – an inactive stereoisomer

== See also ==
- Substituted lysergamide
