= LSD =

Psychedelic drug

Lysergic acid diethylamide INN: Lysergide
- Skeletal formula of LSD

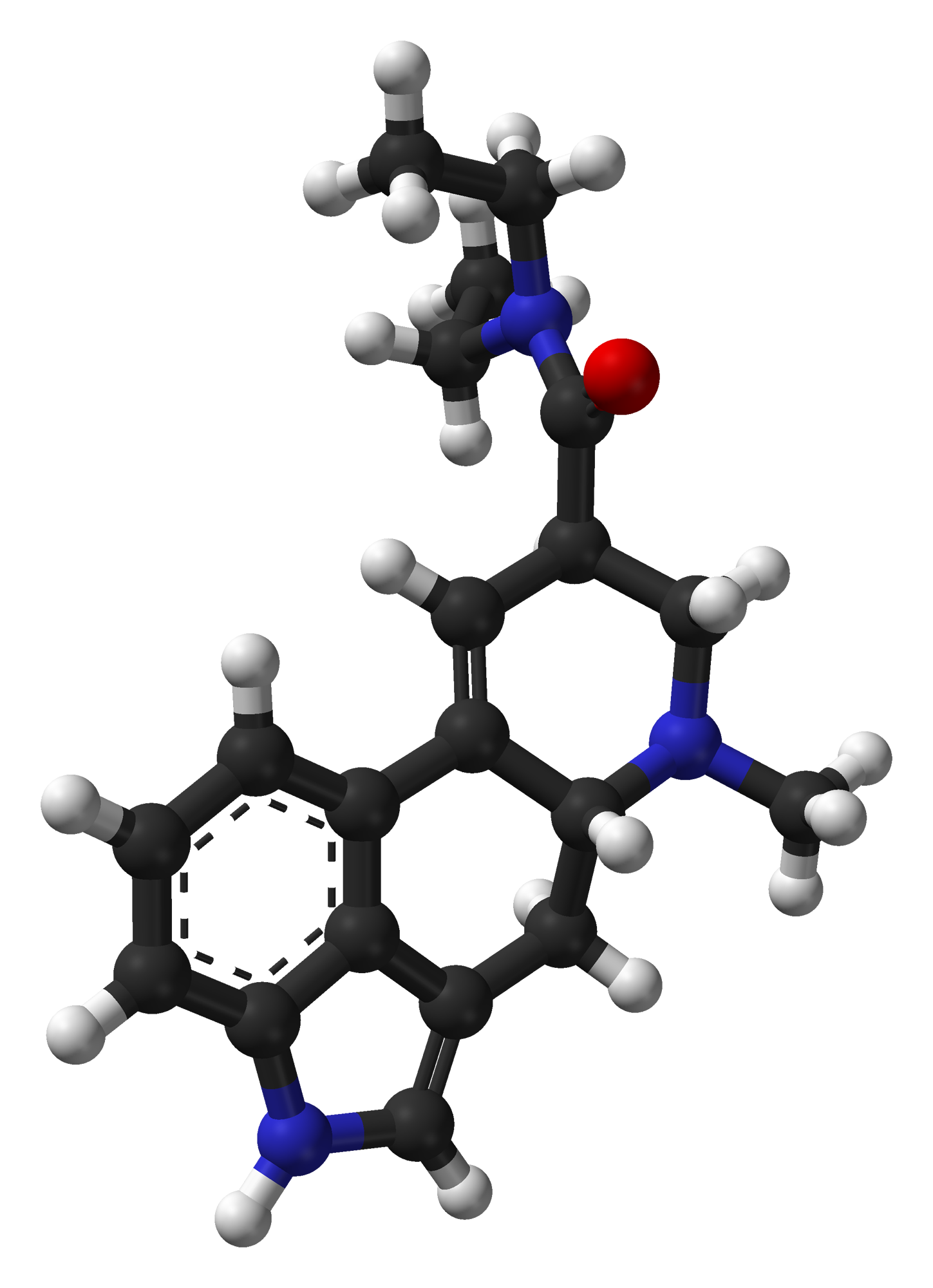
- 3D stick model of LSD

Clinical data
- Pronunciation: /daɪ eθəl ˈæmaɪd/, /æmɪd/, or /eɪmaɪd/
- Trade names: Delysid
- Other names: LSD; L; ACID
- AHFS/Drugs.com: Reference
- Pregnancy category: C
- Dependence liability: None
- Addiction liability: None
- Routes of administration: Oral
- Drug class: Serotonin receptor agonist; Serotonin 5-HT_{2A} receptor agonist; Serotonergic psychedelic; Hallucinogen
- ATC code: None

Legal status
- Legal status: AU: S9 (Prohibited substance); BR: Class F2 (Prohibited psychotropics); CA: Schedule III; DE: Anlage I (Authorized scientific use only); NZ: Class A; UK: Class A; US: Schedule I; UN: Psychotropic Schedule I; SE: Förteckning I; Illicit drug

Pharmacokinetic data
- Bioavailability: 80%
- Protein binding: Unknown (but 65–90% in guinea pigs)
- Metabolism: Liver (CYP450)
- Metabolites: • 2-Oxo-3-hydroxy-LSD • 2-Oxo-LSD • LAE • LEO • Nor-LSD • 13-Hydroxy-LSD • 14-Hydroxy-LSD • Glucuronides
- Onset of action: Oral: 0.4–1.0 (range 0.1–1.8) hours IM: 15–20 min IV: 2.5 min IT: <1 min
- Elimination half-life: 3.0–4.3 hours
- Duration of action: Oral: 7–12 (range 4–22) hours IM, IV, IT: 8–10 hours
- Excretion: Kidneys

Identifiers
- IUPAC name: (6aR,9R)-N,N-diethyl-7-methyl-4,6,6a,7,8,9-hexahydroindolo[4,3-fg]quinoline-9-carboxamide
- CAS Number: 50-37-3
- PubChem CID: 5761
- IUPHAR/BPS: 17
- DrugBank: DB04829
- ChemSpider: 5558
- UNII: 8NA5SWF92O
- KEGG: C07542
- ChEBI: CHEBI:6605
- ChEMBL: ChEMBL263881
- PDB ligand: 7LD (PDBe, RCSB PDB)
- CompTox Dashboard (EPA): DTXSID1023231
- ECHA InfoCard: 100.000.031

Chemical and physical data
- Formula: C_{20}H_{25}N_{3}O
- Molar mass: 323.440 g·mol^{−1}
- 3D model (JSmol): Interactive image
- Melting point: 80 to 85 °C (176 to 185 °F)
- Solubility in water: 67.02 mg/mL (20 °C)
- SMILES: CCN(CC)C(=O)[C@H]1CN([C@@H]2CC3=CNC4=CC=CC(=C34)C2=C1)C
- InChI: InChI=1S/C20H25N3O/c1-4-23(5-2)20(24)14-9-16-15-7-6-8-17-19(15)13(11-21-17)10-18(16)22(3)12-14/h6-9,11,14,18,21H,4-5,10,12H2,1-3H3/t14-,18-/m1/s1; Key:VAYOSLLFUXYJDT-RDTXWAMCSA-N

Lysergic acid diethylamide, commonly known as LSD (from German Lysergsäurediethylamid) and by the nicknames acid and Lucy, is a semisynthetic psychedelic drug derived from ergot, known for its potent psychological effects.

LSD taken orally has an onset of action of 0.4 to 1.0 hours and a duration of 7 to 12 hours. In recreational settings it is commonly administered via tabs of blotter paper. LSD is extremely potent, with noticeable effects at doses as low as 20 micrograms and is sometimes taken in even smaller amounts for microdosing. Despite widespread use, no fatal human overdoses have been documented. LSD is mainly used recreationally or for spiritual purposes. LSD can cause mystical experiences. LSD exerts its effects primarily through high-affinity binding to several serotonin receptors, especially the serotonin 5-HT_{2A} receptor, and to a lesser extent dopamine and adrenergic receptors. Neuroimaging studies indicate that LSD reduces the efficacy of thalamo-cortical information filtering (producing sensory overload), decreases oscillatory power within the default mode network, and flattens hierarchical organization of large-brain activity. At higher doses, it can induce visual and auditory hallucinations, ego dissolution, and anxiety. LSD use can cause hallucinogen-induced psychotic disorder where paranoia and delusions persist beyond the initial effects of the drug. LSD may lead to persistent visual disturbances known as hallucinogen persisting perception disorder (HPPD).

Swiss chemist Albert Hofmann first synthesized LSD in 1938 and discovered its potent psychedelic effects in 1943 after accidental ingestion. It became widely studied in the 1950s and 1960s. The drug was initially explored for psychiatric use due to its structural similarity to serotonin and safety profile. It was used experimentally in psychiatry for treating alcoholism and schizophrenia. By the mid-1960s, LSD became central to the youth counterculture in places like San Francisco and London, influencing art, music, and social movements through events like Acid Tests and figures such as Timothy Leary, Owsley Stanley and Michael Hollingshead. Its psychedelic effects inspired distinct visual art styles and musical innovations, and caused a lasting cultural impact. However, its association with the counterculture movement of the 1960s led to its classification as a Schedule I drug in the United States in 1970. It was also listed as a Schedule I controlled substance by the United Nations in 1971 and remains without approved medical uses.

Despite its legal restrictions, LSD remains influential in scientific and cultural contexts. Research on LSD declined due to cultural controversies by the 1960s, but has resurged since 2009. In 2024, the United States Food and Drug Administration designated LSD (code name MM120 or DT120) as a breakthrough therapy for generalized anxiety disorder. As of 2017, about 10% of people in the United States had used LSD at some point, with 0.7% having used it in the past year. Usage rates have risen, with a 56.4% increase in adult use in the United States from 2015 to 2018.

== Uses ==
=== Recreational ===
LSD is commonly used as a recreational drug for its psychedelic effects.

=== Spiritual ===
LSD can catalyze intense spiritual experiences and is thus considered an entheogen. Some users have reported out of body experiences. In 1966, Timothy Leary established the League for Spiritual Discovery with LSD as its sacrament. Stanislav Grof has written that religious and mystical experiences observed during LSD sessions appear similar to descriptions in sacred scriptures of great religions of the world and the texts of ancient civilizations.

=== Medical ===
In Switzerland, a special authorization program allows limited medical use of substances like LSD for patients with serious, treatment-resistant conditions, with patients treated under physician supervision.

=== Dosing ===
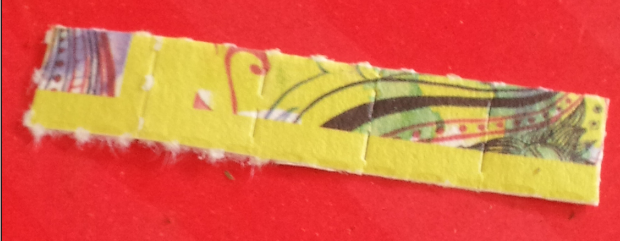
A "five strip" of LSD blotters.

LSD is an extraordinarily potent substance, and is one of the most potent psychoactive drugs known. This means that it produces its pharmacological effects at very small doses, with its dose range measured in micrograms (μg); that is, millionths of a gram. Noticeable effects can occur with doses of LSD as low as 20 μg, which is around 1/200th the mass of a grain of sand. LSD is approximately 200 times as potent as psilocybin and 5,000 times as potent as mescaline, meaning that it produces effects of similar magnitude at 1/200 and 1/5,000 times the respective doses.

The usual dose range of LSD for psychedelic effects is 20 to 200 μg. The typical intermediate and "good effect" dose for a psychedelic experience is 100 μg (range 75–150 μg, while 20 to 50 μg is a low or "minidose" and 200 μg is a high or ego-dissolution dose.) A dose range as wide as 10 to 450 μg has been reported. LSD may also be used in microdosing. In this context, it may be used at subthreshold or microdoses of less than 10 μg.

The extremely high potency of LSD played an essential role in its emergence and popularity during the counterculture of the 1960s due to the economic feasibility of its manufacture, in contrast to the case of mescaline, which had been known for many decades previously but remained relatively obscure.

The doses of LSD present in illicit LSD samples have decreased over time. In the mid-1960s, Owsley Stanley, the most important black market LSD manufacturer in the United States, distributed LSD at a standard concentration of 270 μg, while street samples of the 1970s contained 30 to 300 μg. By the 1980s, the amount had reduced to between 100 and 125 μg, dropping more in the 1990s to the 20 to 80 μg range, and even further in the 2000s.

== Effects ==
LSD produces a variety of physical, psychological, and sensory effects.

=== Psychological ===
The primary immediate psychological effects of LSD are visual pseudo-hallucinations and altered thought, often referred to as "trips". These sensory alterations are considered pseudohallucinations because the subject does not perceive the patterns seen as being located in three-dimensional space outside the body. LSD is not considered addictive. An "afterglow" effect, characterized by an improved mood or perceived mental state, may persist for days or weeks following ingestion. Positive experiences, or "good trips", are described as intensely pleasurable and can include feelings of joy, euphoria, an increased appreciation for life, decreased anxiety, a sense of spiritual enlightenment, and a feeling of interconnectedness with the universe.

Negative experiences, commonly known as "bad trips", can induce feelings of fear, agitation, anxiety, panic, and paranoia. While the occurrence of a bad trip is unpredictable, factors such as mood, surroundings, sleep, hydration, and social setting, collectively referred to as "set and setting", can influence the risk and are considered important in minimizing the likelihood of a negative experience.

Uniquely among psychedelics, LSD appears to have two temporally and qualitatively distinct phases of psychoactive effects. These include an initial psychedelic phase associated with serotonin 5-HT_{2A} receptor agonism and a subsequent paranoia- and psychosis-like phase associated with dopamine D_{2}-like receptor agonism. Subsequent research has found that the delayed dopaminergic phase is associated with the highly potent dopamine D_{4} receptor agonism of LSD's metabolite 13-hydroxy-LSD. The first phase is described as a "psychedelic experience", with "meaningfulness and portentousness" as the primary effects, while the latter phase is "clearly a paranoid state", including feeling "at the least self-centered, and usually suspicious, with ideas of reference or even paranoid convictions". The second phase typically develops about 4 to 6 hours after administration but at times up to 10 hours after administration. Parallels have been drawn between this phase and amphetamine psychosis. There is no indication that similar effects occur with other psychedelics like phenethylamines and simple tryptamines, which lack dopamine receptor agonism. The preceding findings have been described by researchers like Daniel X. Freedman and David E. Nichols.

=== Sensory ===
LSD induces an animated sensory experience affecting senses, emotions, memories, time, and awareness. The effects range from subtle perceptual changes to profound cognitive shifts. Alterations in hearing and visual perception are common.

Users may experience enhanced visual phenomena, such as vibrant colors, objects appearing to morph, ripple, or move, and geometric patterns on various surfaces. Changes in the perception of food's texture and taste are also noted, sometimes leading to aversion towards certain foods.

There are reports of inanimate objects appearing animated, with static objects seeming to move in additional spatial dimensions. The auditory effects of LSD may include echo-like distortions of sounds, and an intensified experience of music. Basic visual effects often resemble phosphenes and can be influenced by concentration, thoughts, emotions, or music. Higher doses can lead to more intense sensory perception alterations, including synesthesia, perception of additional dimensions, and temporary dissociation.

=== Physical ===
Some symptoms reported for LSD.

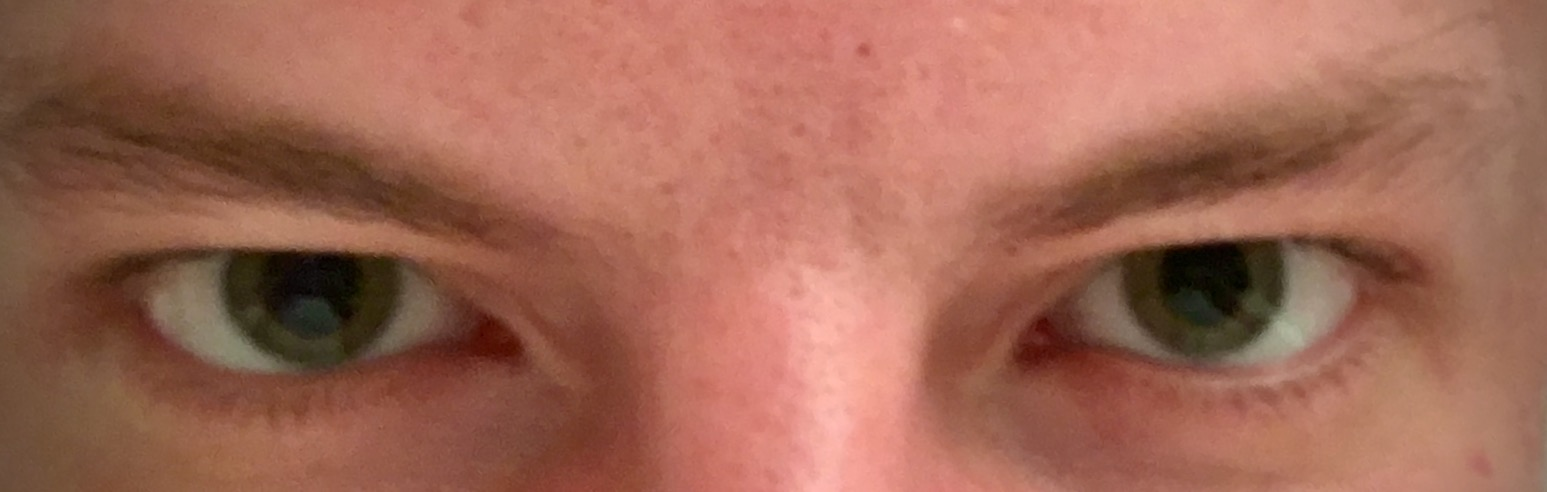
Patient with mydriasis (pupil dilation) due to usage of LSD.

LSD can induce physical effects such as pupil dilation, decreased appetite, increased sweating, and wakefulness. The physical reactions to LSD vary greatly, and some may be a result of its psychological effects. Commonly observed symptoms include increased body temperature, blood sugar, and heart rate, as well as goose bumps, jaw clenching, dry mouth, and hyperreflexia. In cases of adverse reactions, users may experience numbness, weakness, nausea, and tremors.

=== Onset and duration ===
The psychoactive effects of LSD last on average between 7 and 11 hours, with a possible range of 4 to 22 hours. Higher doses tend to lead to a longer duration of action. The onset of action when administered orally is 0.4 to 1.0 hours on average, with a possible range of 0.1 to 1.8 hours. The time to peak effects given orally is 2.2 to 2.8 hours on average, with a range of 1.3 to 6.5 hours.

The duration of LSD can be shortened through the use of trip killers or shorteners like ketanserin. In a clinical trial, ketanserin given 1 hour after LSD shortened its duration from 8.5 hours to 3.5 hours or by about 60%.

== Adverse effects ==
Table from the 2010 ISCD study ranking various drugs (legal and illegal) based on statements by drug-harm experts. LSD was found to be the 18th most dangerous out of 20 considered.

Addiction experts in psychiatry, chemistry, pharmacology, forensic science, epidemiology, and the police and legal services engaged in delphic analysis regarding 20 popular recreational drugs. LSD was ranked 14th in dependence, 15th in physical harm, and 13th in social harm.

LSD, a classical psychedelic, is deemed physiologically safe at standard doses (50–200 μg), and its primary risks lie in psychological effects rather than physiological harm. A 2010 study by David Nutt ranked LSD as significantly less harmful than alcohol, placing it near the bottom of a list assessing the harm of 20 drugs.

=== Psychological effects ===
LSD can induce panic attacks or extreme anxiety, colloquially termed a "bad trip". Despite lower rates of depression and substance abuse found in psychedelic drug users compared to controls, LSD presents a heightened a risk of hallucinogen-induced psychotic disorder for individuals with mental illnesses such as bipolar disorder or schizophrenia or who have a family history of those illnesses. It is common for people with pre-existing mental illness to be hospitalized for hallucinogen-induced psychotic disorder caused by LSD. LSD is also the main cause of hallucinogen persisting perception disorder (HPPD), where visual distortions persist beyond the initial effects of the drug.

==== Suggestibility ====
While research from the 1960s indicated increased suggestibility under the influence of LSD among both mentally ill and healthy individuals, the CIA and US Department of Defense conducted secret mind control experiments in which LSD was administered to unwitting human subjects as part of secret operations MKUltra and Operation Midnight Climax.

==== Flashbacks ====
Flashbacks are psychological episodes where individuals re-experience some of LSD's subjective effects after the drug has worn off, persisting for days or months post-hallucinogen use. These experiences are associated with hallucinogen persisting perception disorder (HPPD), where flashbacks occur intermittently or chronically, causing distress or functional impairment.

The etiology of flashbacks is varied. Some cases are attributed to somatic symptom disorder, where individuals fixate on normal somatic experiences previously unnoticed before drug consumption. Other instances are linked to associative reactions to contextual cues, similar to responses observed in individuals with past trauma or emotional experiences. The risk factors for flashbacks remain unclear, but pre-existing psychopathologies may be significant contributors.

Estimating the prevalence of HPPD is challenging. It is considered rare, with occurrences ranging from 1 in 20 users experiencing the transient and less severe type 1 HPPD, to 1 in 50,000 for the more concerning type 2 HPPD. Contrary to internet rumors, LSD is not stored long-term in the spinal cord or other parts of the body. Pharmacological evidence indicates LSD has a half-life of 175 minutes and is metabolized into water-soluble compounds like 2-oxo-3-hydroxy-LSD, eliminated through urine without evidence of long-term storage. Clinical evidence also suggests that chronic use of SSRIs can potentiate LSD-induced flashbacks, even months after stopping LSD use.

==== Hallucinogen-induced psychotic disorder ====
LSD can rarely cause hallucinogen-induced psychotic disorder (HIPD), where after the drug has run its course, paranoia, delusions, hallucinations, or a reduced ability to communicate occur. A common presentation of hallucinogen-induced psychotic disorder is paranoia or severe anxiety days or weeks after LSD use. Hallucinogen-induced psychotic disorder is a medical emergency. It is also known under the more general term, substance-induced psychosis. The treatment for hallucinogen-induced psychotic disorder is atypical antipsychotics such as aripiprazole, quetiapine, or olanzapine, or risperidone. The condition occurs in fewer than 1% of people with psychedelics.

==== Suicide ====
LSD has led to suicide weeks or months after ingestion. LSD was originally categorized as a schedule I controlled substance because of the suicide of Diane Linkletter 6 months after she took LSD. There are several case reports of suicidal reactions to LSD.

=== Tolerance ===
LSD shows significant tachyphylaxis, with tolerance developing 24 hours after administration. The progression of tolerance at intervals shorter than 24 hours remains largely unknown. Tolerance typically resets to baseline after 3–4 days of abstinence. Significant cross-tolerance occurs between LSD, mescaline and psilocybin. A slight cross-tolerance to DMT is observed in humans highly tolerant to LSD. Tolerance to LSD also builds up with consistent use, and is believed to result from serotonin 5-HT_{2A} receptor downregulation. Researchers believe that tolerance returns to baseline after two weeks of not using psychedelics.

=== Addiction and dependence liability ===
LSD is widely considered to be non-addictive, despite its potential for abuse. Attempts to train laboratory animals to self-administer LSD have been largely unsuccessful. Although tolerance to LSD builds up rapidly, a withdrawal syndrome does not appear, suggesting that a potential syndrome does not necessarily relate to the possibility of acquiring rapid tolerance to a substance. A report examining substance use disorder for DSM-IV noted that almost no hallucinogens produced dependence, unlike psychoactive drugs of other classes such as stimulants and depressants.

=== Cancer and pregnancy ===
The mutagenic potential of LSD is unclear. Overall, the evidence points to limited or no effect at commonly used doses. Studies showed no evidence of teratogenic or mutagenic effects.

=== Long-term effects ===
A potential risk of frequent repeated long-term use of LSD and other serotonergic psychedelics is cardiac fibrosis and valvulopathy due to serotonin 5-HT_{2B} receptor agonism. This may also be the case with microdosing. However, the risks are theoretical, and more research is needed to see if these complications can actually occur with psychedelics. A preliminary animal study found that chronic microdosing of LSD did not result in heart structure changes or valvulopathy in rodents. Research appears to be mixed on whether LSD is a potent serotonin 5-HT_{2B} receptor agonist or not, with some studies finding it to be essentially inactive.

== Interactions ==
Some psychedelics, including LSD, are metabolized by the cytochrome P450 enzyme CYP2D6. Concurrent use of selective serotonin reuptake inhibitors (SSRIs), some of which are potent inhibitors of CYP2D6, with LSD might heighten the risk of serotonin syndrome. However, according to other researchers, there is no risk of serotonin syndrome combining psychedelics like LSD and psilocybin with SSRIs. Chronic usage of SSRIs, tricyclic antidepressants (TCAs), and monoamine oxidase inhibitors (MAOIs) is believed to diminish the subjective effects of psychedelics, likely due to 5-HT_{2A} receptor downregulation or desensitization induced by elevated serotonin levels. However, a clinical study found that administration of LSD to people taking paroxetine, an SSRI and strong CYP2D6 inhibitor, increased LSD exposure by about 1.5-fold, was well-tolerated, and did not modify the pleasant subjective effects or physiological effects of LSD, whereas negative effects of LSD, including "bad drug effect", anxiety, and nausea, were reduced. Similarly, a clinical study with LSD found that LSD levels were 75% higher in people with non-functional CYP2D6 (poor metabolizers) compared to those with functional CYP2D6. In contrast to certain other psychedelics, MAOIs do not inhibit the metabolism of or potentiate the effects of LSD and instead reduce its effects. Interactions between psychedelics and antipsychotics or anticonvulsants are not well-documented; however, co-use with mood stabilizers like lithium may induce seizures and dissociative effects, particularly in individuals with bipolar disorder. Lithium notably intensifies LSD reactions, potentially leading to acute comatose states when combined.

== Overdose ==
LSD at typical recreational doses (~50–250 μg) is considered to be very safe in terms of toxicity, with not a single toxicity-related death having been reported at such doses despite many millions of exposures. In addition, LSD is considered to be a relatively non-toxic drug in overdose. The highest dose of LSD evaluated in clinical trials in humans has been 800 μg (0.8 mg), or 8 times the typical recreational dose of 100 μg. However, other studies reported use of doses of up to 2,000 μg intramuscularly in some individuals, or more than 20 times the typical dose. It is estimated, based on animal studies and human case reports, that the lethal dose of LSD in humans is approximately 100 mg, or 1,000 times the typical dose. There have been a handful of reported cases of fatal overdose with LSD as of 2024. However, critical review of the literature by David E. Nichols found that of five identified cases, one was not consistent with the effects of LSD but instead may have been another drug like 25I-NBOMe; two involved normal doses of LSD in individuals who were placed in maximal physical restraint (hogtied) by police followed by presumed positional asphyxia and fatal cardiovascular collapse (hogtying being a practice that is associated with accidental death generally); and two were associated with massive LSD overdose involving doses of possibly more than 300 mg. Besides death due to toxicity, LSD is rarely associated with death via suicide, accidents, or violent encounters due to induction of abnormal behavior.

In one well-known 1974 case series, 8 people accidentally insufflated two "lines" of nearly pure LSD powder that they thought were cocaine. The exact doses of LSD were unknown, but were considered to be massive. For context, a typical "line" of cocaine for insufflation is 50 to 100 mg. The individuals reported to the hospital within 10 to 15 minutes, with five of them comatose, three requiring intubation and mechanical ventilation, and the conscious individuals experiencing severe hallucinogenic effects, among other toxic symptoms. All of them completely recovered within 12 hours and there were no deaths. A subsequent 2020 case similarly involved accidental insufflation of a confirmed 55 mg dose of LSD instead of cocaine, which was without adverse health consequences. In other reports, a 5 mg overdose of LSD produced severe nausea and vomiting along with severe behavioral disturbances, while a 10 mg overdose was also non-fatal.

Despite acting as non-selective serotonin receptor agonists, major psychedelics like LSD and psilocybin do not cause serotonin syndrome even with extreme overdose. This is thought to be because they act as partial agonists of serotonin receptors like the serotonin 5-HT_{2A} receptor relative to serotonin itself. Conversely, NBOMe psychedelics like 25I-NBOMe are more efficacious and have been uniquely associated with serotonin syndrome-like toxicity. A 2018 retrospective analysis of 3,554 LSD-only exposures reported to poison control centers in the United States between 2000 and 2016 found that serious toxicity was infrequent. Common adverse effects (2.4–42%) included agitation or irritability, tachycardia, hallucinations or delusions, confusion, pupil dilation, hypertension, drowsiness or lethargy, elevated creatine phosphokinase (CPK), nausea and vomiting, and others. Selected serious adverse effects included fever or hyperthermia in 3.8%, single seizure in 2.4%, coma in 1.4%, elevated creatinine in 1.4%, multiple seizures in 1.2%, rhabdomyolysis in 1.1%, respiratory depression in 0.9%, cardiac conduction disorder in 0.5%, and status epilepticus in 0.4%. There is a case report of severe neurological sequelae following a single typical recreational dose of LSD involving seizure and cardiorespiratory arrest. In general, psychedelics like LSD may rarely cause seizures in some individuals.

The median lethal dose (LD_{50}) of LSD in animals varies and is 50 to 60 mg/kg in mice, 16.5 mg/kg in rats, and 0.3 mg/kg in rabbits all given by injection. A well-known 1962 instance of an elephant named Tusko given 297 mg (~0.1 mg/kg) LSD by intramuscular injection proved fatal. These findings suggest that elephants may be much more sensitive to LSD in overdose than humans and other species. However, this instance has been mired in criticism and controversy due to miscalculation of LSD dose and concomitant post-LSD administration of promazine and pentobarbital. The experiment was repeated in two elephants with similar doses of LSD in 1984 without incident.

Massive doses of LSD are largely managed by symptomatic treatments, and agitation can be addressed with benzodiazepines. Reassurance in a calm, safe environment is beneficial. Antipsychotics such as haloperidol are not recommended as they may have adverse effects. Gastrointestinal decontamination with activated charcoal is of little use due to the rapid absorption of LSD, unless performed within 30 to 60 minutes of ingesting exceedingly huge amounts. Administration of anticoagulants, vasodilators, and sympatholytics may be useful for treating ergotism.

=== LSD substitute overdose ===
Although LSD is relatively safe in overdose, 25-NB (NBOMe) psychedelics like 25I-NBOMe and 25B-NBOMe are often sold as "LSD" and are highly toxic in overdose, with many reported severe intoxications and deaths. Owing to their high potency analogous to LSD, these drugs are also regularly sold as "LSD" in blotter papers. Fatalities involved in NBOMe intoxication suggest that a significant number of individuals ingested the substance which they believed was LSD, and researchers report that "users familiar with LSD may have a false sense of security when ingesting NBOMe inadvertently". Researchers state that the alleged physiological toxicity of LSD is likely due to psychoactive substances other than LSD.

NBOMe compounds are reported to have a bitter taste, are not active orally, (Note: The potency of N-benzylphenethylamines via buccal, sublingual, or nasal absorption is 50–100 greater (by weight) than oral route compared to the parent 2C-x compounds. Researches hypothesize the low oral metabolic stability of N-benzylphenethylamines is likely causing the low bioavailability on the oral route, although the metabolic profile of this compounds remains unpredictable; therefore researches state that the fatalities linked to these substances may partly be explained by differences in the metabolism between individuals.) and are usually taken sublingually. When NBOMes are administered sublingually, numbness of the tongue and mouth followed by a metallic chemical taste was observed, and researchers describe this physical side effect as one of the main discriminants between NBOMe compounds and LSD. Despite its high potency, recreational doses of LSD have only produced low incidents of acute toxicity, but NBOMe compounds have extremely different safety profiles. Testing with Ehrlich's reagent gives a positive result for LSD and a negative result for NBOMe compounds.

== Pharmacology ==
=== Pharmacodynamics ===
Activities of LSD
Target	Affinity (K_{i}, nM)
5-HT_{1A}	0.64–7.3 (K_{i}); 6.4 (EC_{50}); 110% (E_{max})
5-HT_{1B}	3.9
5-HT_{1D}	3.9–14
5-HT_{1E}	93
5-HT_{1F}	ND
5-HT_{2A}	0.47–21 (K_{i}); 0.24–538 (EC_{50}); 23–88% (E_{max})
5-HT_{2B}	0.98–30 (K_{i}); 0.68–12,000 (EC_{50}); 13–73% (E_{max})
5-HT_{2C}	1.1–48 (K_{i}); 0.85–1,590 (EC_{50}); 26–79% (E_{max})
5-HT_{3}	>10,000
5-HT_{4}	1,000 (rat)
5-HT_{5A}	9.0
5-HT_{5B}	3.2 (rat)
5-HT_{6}	2.3–6.9
5-HT_{7}	6.3–6.6
α_{1A}	670–1,128
α_{1B}	8,677
α_{1D}	ND
α_{2A}	12–46
α_{2B}, α_{2C}	ND
β_{1}	140–1,601
β_{2}	740–3,461
β_{3}	ND
D_{1}	155–340 (K_{i}); 35–63 (EC_{50}); 35–44% (E_{max})
D_{2}	61–126
D_{3}	27–60
D_{4}	26–158
D_{5}	75–344
H_{1}	1,100–1,540
H_{2}–H_{4}	ND
M_{1}–M_{5}	ND
I_{1}	ND
σ_{1}, σ_{2}	ND
TAAR1	450 (K_{i}) (rat); 10,000 (K_{i}) (mouse); 1,400 (EC_{50}) (rat); 9,700 (EC_{50}) (mouse) >20,000 (EC_{50}) (human)
SERT	>30,000 (K_{i}) >100,000 (IC_{50})
NET	5,600–>30,000 (K_{i}) >100,000 (IC_{50})
DAT	>30,000 (K_{i}) >100,000 (IC_{50})
Notes: The smaller the value, the more avidly the drug binds to the site. All proteins are human unless otherwise noted. Refs:

LSD is a serotonergic psychedelic and acts as a non-selective serotonin receptor modulator. It binds with high affinity to most of the serotonin receptors. The psychedelic effects of LSD are thought to be mediated specifically by activation of the serotonin 5-HT_{2A} receptor. However, the role of other serotonin receptors and targets in the effects of LSD cannot be ruled out and may be considered likely. Uniquely among serotonergic psychedelics, LSD also shows potentially significant affinity for the dopamine receptors, albeit much lower than for most of the serotonin receptors.

LSD binds to most serotonin receptor subtypes except for the serotonin 5-HT_{3} and 5-HT_{4} receptors. However, some of these serotonin receptors may not be affected at typical brain concentrations of LSD. In humans, recreational doses of LSD may affect serotonin 5-HT_{1A}, 5-HT_{2A}, 5-HT_{2B}, 5-HT_{2C}, 5-HT_{5A}, and 5-HT_{6} receptors. Although not present in humans, serotonin 5-HT_{5B} receptors found in rodents also have high affinity for LSD. The psychedelic effects of LSD are attributed to activation of 5-HT_{2A} receptors. Many but not all serotonin 5-HT_{2A} receptor agonists are psychedelics, and serotonin 5-HT_{2A} receptor antagonists block the psychedelic effects of LSD. The drug exhibits pronounced functional selectivity or biased agonism at the serotonin 5-HT_{2A} and 5-HT_{2C} receptors in that it activates the signal transduction enzyme phospholipase A2 (PLA2) instead of activating the enzyme phospholipase C (PLC) as the endogenous ligand serotonin does, among other differences.

Exactly how LSD produces its effects is unknown, but it is thought that it may work in part by increasing glutamate release in the cerebral cortex and therefore excitation in this area, specifically in layer V. LSD, like many other drugs of recreational use, has been shown to activate DARPP-32-related pathways. The drug enhances dopamine D_{2} receptor protomer recognition and signaling of D_{2}–5-HT_{2A} heteromeric receptor complexes, which may contribute to its psychotropic effects. LSD has been shown to have low affinity for histamine H_{1} receptors, displaying antihistamine effects, although the significance of this at doses used in humans is unknown. David E. Nichols has suggested that there may be a pharmacological basis for some bad trips with LSD, with this thought to be related to LSD's metabolite 13-hydroxy-LSD, a highly potent dopamine D_{4} receptor agonist.

LSD is a biased agonist that induces a conformation in serotonin 5-HT_{2} receptors that preferentially recruits β-arrestin over activating G proteins. It also has an exceptionally long residence time when bound to serotonin receptors lasting hours, consistent with the long-lasting effects of LSD despite its relatively rapid clearance. In rodents, LSD levels are undetectable by 8 hours post-dosing, yet LSD continues to produce partial interoceptive effects (54% responding) at this time point. A crystal structure of the serotonin 5-HT_{2B} receptor bound to LSD reveals an extracellular loop that forms a "lid" over the diethylamide end of the binding cavity and "traps" LSD in the binding pocket, which explains the slow rate of LSD unbinding from serotonin receptors. The related lysergamide lysergic acid amide (LSA) that lacks the diethylamide moiety is far less potent in comparison. Moreover, a specific residue in the binding pocket is partially responsible for the prolonged action of LSD, and this residue is found in the human protein but not in the receptors of rodents.

LSD is an extraordinarily potent psychoactive drug and is among the most potent psychedelics known in humans. The very high potency of LSD in producing psychedelic-like effects is also the case in animals, including rodents and monkeys. It is unclear why LSD is so potent. The affinity and activational potency of LSD at the human serotonin 5-HT_{2A} receptor in vitro is unremarkable compared to other psychedelics such as DOI and DOB. There is no evidence for its greater potency being related to pharmacokinetics or metabolism. It appears that the N,N-diethylamide moiety of LSD fits into a sterically constrained region of the serotonin 5-HT_{2A} receptor that specifically accommodates this moiety.

LSD, like other psychedelics, has been found to increase the expression of genes related to synaptic plasticity and hence to have psychoplastogenic effects. This appears to be mediated by serotonin 5-HT_{2A} receptor agonism. LSD has also been reported to act as a highly potent positive allosteric modulator of the tropomyosin receptor kinase B (TrkB), one of the receptors of brain-derived neurotrophic factor (BDNF). However, subsequent studies failed to reproduce these findings and instead found no interaction of LSD with TrkB.

There appears to be no significant acute tolerance to the subjective effects of LSD. Hence, its duration appears to be dictated by pharmacokinetics rather than by pharmacodynamics. This is in contrast to MDMA, which shows marked acute tolerance and a duration of effects that is shorter than its elimination half-life.

The cryo-EM structures of the serotonin 5-HT_{2A} receptor with LSD, as well as with various other psychedelics and serotonin 5-HT_{2A} receptor agonists, have been solved and published by Bryan L. Roth and colleagues.

==== Mechanisms of action ====
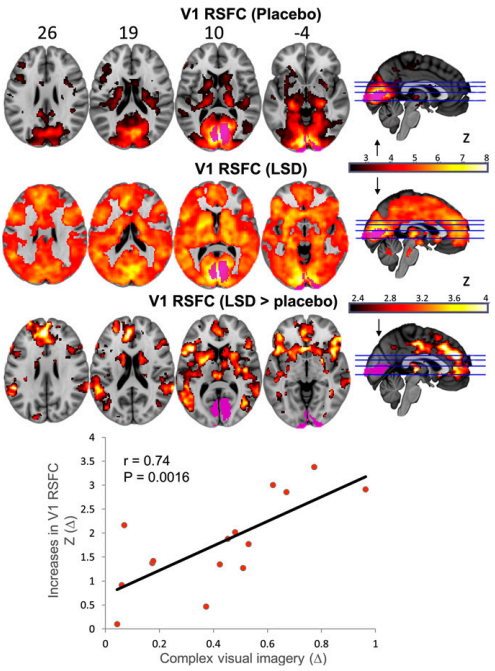
Resting state fMRI BOLD-contrast imaging shows increased primary visual cortex (V1) cerebral blood flow (CBF) and increased V1 resting state functional connectivity (RSFC), which correlated more strongly with the visual hallucinatory aspect of the LSD experience. Increased V1 RSFC also correlated with visual analogue scale (VAS) ratings of simple hallucinations and the magnitude of CBF observed in the visual cortex correlated positively with ratings of complex imagery on the LSD-induced altered state of consciousness (ASC).

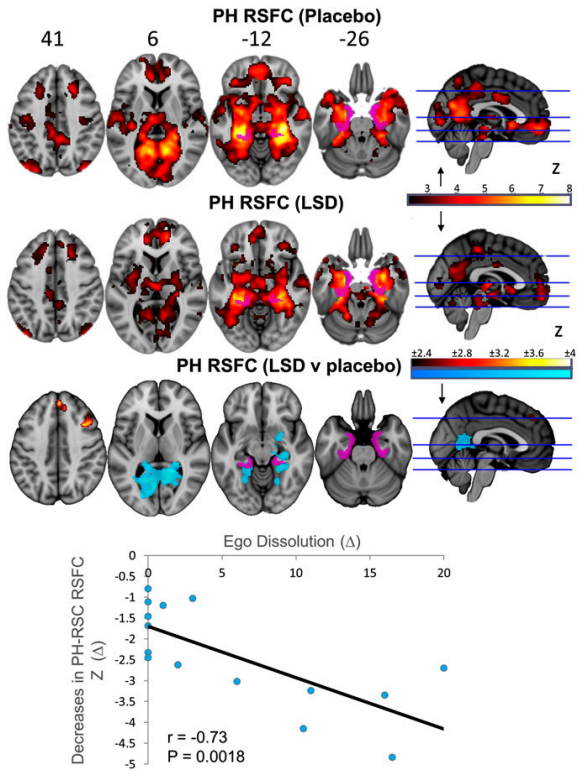
Resting state fMRI BOLD-contrast imaging shows decreased bilateral parahippocampal (PH) resting state functional connectivity (RSFC), which correlated with the ego-dissolution aspect of the LSD experience. A significant relationship was also found between decreased posterior cingulate cortex (PCC) alpha power and default mode network (DMN) disintegration with ego-dissolution.

Neuroimaging studies using resting state fMRI recently suggested that LSD changes the cortical functional architecture. These modifications spatially overlap with the distribution of serotonergic receptors. In particular, increased connectivity and activity were observed in regions with high expression of 5-HT_{2A} receptor, while a decrease in activity and connectivity was observed in cortical areas that are dense with 5-HT_{1A} receptor. Experimental data suggest that subcortical structures, particularly the thalamus, play a synergistic role with the cerebral cortex in mediating the psychedelic experience. LSD, through its binding to cortical 5-HT_{2A} receptors, may enhance excitatory neurotransmission along frontostriatal projections and, consequently, reduce thalamic filtering of sensory stimuli towards the cortex. This phenomenon appears to involve ventral, intralaminar, and pulvinar nuclei selectively.

==== Neurotoxicity ====
Chronic administration of LSD has been associated with long-lasting schizophrenia-like behavioral changes in rodents, which were not blocked by serotonin 5-HT_{2A} receptor antagonism but may instead be related to LSD's dopamine D_{2}-like receptor agonism. Single macrodoses of LSD do not produce such changes in rodents, but the preceding findings may have implications for continuous psychedelic microdosing with LSD.

LSD, via activation of serotonin 5-HT_{2} receptors, has been found to potentiate MDMA-induced serotonergic neurotoxicity in rodents.

=== Pharmacokinetics ===
==== Absorption ====
The oral bioavailability of LSD was crudely estimated as approximately 71% using previous data on intravenous administration of LSD. The sample was equally divided between male and female subjects. There were no significant sex differences observed in the pharmacokinetics of LSD. In a subsequent higher-quality 2025 study, the oral bioavailability of LSD was about 80%.

The pharmacokinetics of LSD were not properly determined until 2015, which is not surprising for a drug with the kind of low-μg potency that LSD possesses. In a sample of 16 healthy subjects, a single mid-range 200 μg oral dose of LSD was found to produce mean maximal concentrations of 4.5 ng/mL at a median of 1.5 hours (range 0.5–4 hours) post-administration.

A large meal before taking LSD has been found to result in circulating levels that were 50% lower than on an empty stomach.

==== Distribution ====
In terms of distribution, it is estimated that only about 1 to 1.5% of the drug reaches the brain both in animals and humans. Following a typical 100 μg dose in humans, this would be about 1 μg that is distributed into the brain. LSD levels in different brain areas have been found to vary in monkeys. Levels were equal in blood, cerebral cortex, cerebellum, and brainstem, whereas levels were 1.5 times higher in the thalamus and extrapyramidal system, 2 to 3 times higher in the hypothalamus and limbic system, 2 to 5 times higher in the auditory and visual cortex, 5 to 7 times higher in the posterior pituitary and pineal gland, and 10 times higher in the anterior pituitary gland. These varying concentrations in different brain areas may explain the specific profile or balance of psychedelic effects of LSD. Bodily distribution of LSD has also been studied.

It has been said that there is a peculiar 40-minute lag before onset of the psychedelic effects of LSD when it is administered intravenously. This has been said to be related to time-dependent interactions of LSD with the serotonin 5-HT_{2A} receptor. However, contradicting the preceding claims, other sources have stated that intravenous injection of LSD results in onset of effects within a few minutes. In a 2025 pharmacokinetic study comparing oral and intravenous LSD, the onset orally was about 45 minutes and the onset by intravenous injection was about 2.5 minutes. In addition, intrathecal injection (intraspinal injection) is reported to have a virtually instantaneous onset of action. However, in the 2025 study, time to maximal effects was about 2.5 hours orally and about 1.2 hours intravenously. In an earlier 2016 study, intravenous LSD effects similarly peaked after about 1.7 hours. For comparison, intravenous dimethyltryptamine (DMT) given as a bolus has been found to produce maximal effects after about 2 minutes and intravenous psilocybin given over 60 seconds produces peak effects after about 4 minutes. Doses of LSD are said to be similar by oral and injectable routes, with the exception of intrathecal injection, in which the dose is reduced to about one-third of usual.

The plasma protein binding of LSD in humans is unknown, but it is 65 to 90% bound to plasma proteins in guinea pigs.

==== Metabolism ====
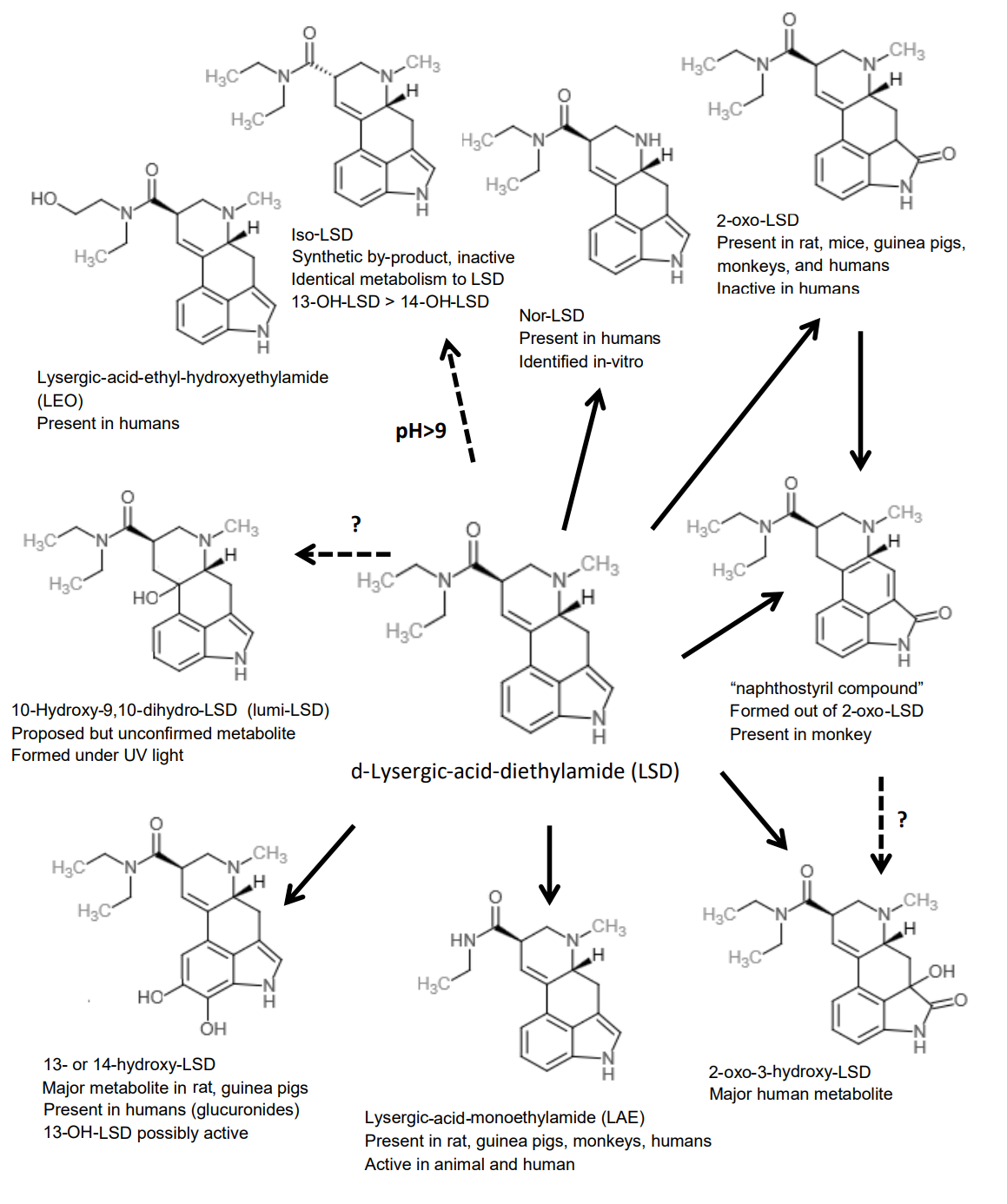
Metabolism of LSD in animals and humans.

The metabolites of LSD include 2-oxo-3-hydroxy-LSD (O-H-LSD), 2-oxo-LSD, lysergic acid ethylamide (LAE), lysergic acid ethyl-2-hydroxyethylamide (LEO), nor-LSD, 13-hydroxy-LSD, 14-hydroxy-LSD, and the glucuronide conjugates of the 13- and 14-hydroxylated metabolites, among other possible metabolites. The major metabolite of LSD is O-H-LSD. Levels of O-H-LSD in urine have been found to be 4 to 40 times higher than those of LSD, indicating extensive metabolism of LSD into this compound. It is formed by cytochrome P450 enzymes, although the specific enzymes involved are unknown, and O-H-LSD's potential pharmacology is little-studied. However, it was found to have profoundly reduced activity at the serotonin 5-HT_{2} receptors relative to LSD in vitro. Little is known about the specific enzymes responsible for the formation of LSD metabolites. LSD is not metabolized by monoamine oxidase (MAO) enzymes.

==== Elimination ====
Only 1% of the drug was eliminated in urine unchanged, whereas 13% was eliminated as O-H-LSD within 24 hours.

Aghajanian and Bing (1964) found LSD had an elimination half-life of only 175 minutes (about 3 hours); however, using more accurate techniques, Papac and Foltz (1990) reported that 1 μg/kg oral LSD given to a single male volunteer had an apparent plasma half-life of 5.1 hours, with a peak plasma concentration of 5 ng/mL at 3 hours post-dose. In a more modern 2015 study, concentrations of LSD decreased following first-order kinetics with a half-life of 3.6 ± 0.9 hours and a terminal half-life of 8.9 ± 5.9 hours. A 2026 review found half-lives ranging from 3.0 to 4.3 hours in different studies.

LSD has a longer half-life of on average 8 hours in CYP2D6 poor metabolizers or people taking CYP2D6 inhibitors due to slower metabolism.

==== Miscellaneous ====
The acute effects of LSD normally last between 6 and 12 hours depending on dose, tolerance, and age. In a modern study, the effects of the dose of LSD given lasted for up to 12 hours and were closely correlated with the concentrations of LSD present in circulation over time, with no acute tolerance observed.

== Chemistry ==
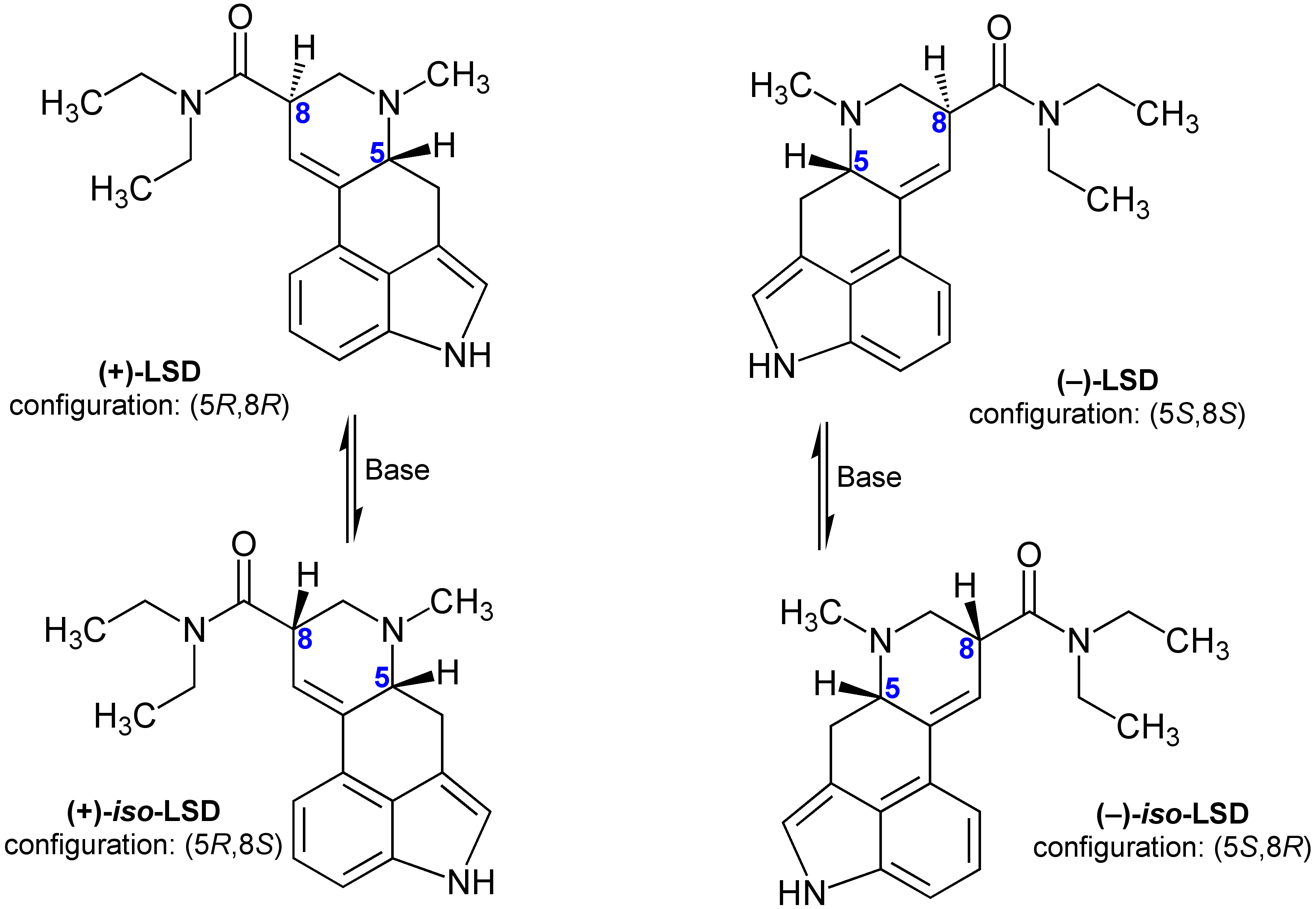
The four possible stereoisomers of the LSD molecule. Only LSD (d-LSD) is active. The other, inactive isomers are iso-LSD (d-iso-LSD), l-LSD, and l-iso-LSD.

LSD is a chiral compound with two stereocenters at the carbon atoms C-5 and C-8, so that theoretically four different optical isomers of LSD could exist. LSD, also called d-LSD or (+)-LSD, has the absolute configuration (5R,8R). The other stereoisomers are iso-LSD (d-iso-LSD), l-LSD, and l-iso-LSD.

The 5S- or levo- stereoisomers of lysergamides do not exist in nature and are not formed during the synthesis from d-lysergic acid. Retrosynthetically, the C-5 stereocenter could be analysed as having the same configuration as the alpha carbon of the naturally occurring amino acid L-tryptophan, the precursor to all biosynthetic ergoline compounds.

However, LSD and iso-LSD, the two C-8 isomers, rapidly interconvert in the presence of bases, as the alpha proton is acidic and can be deprotonated and reprotonated. Non-psychoactive iso-LSD, which has formed during the synthesis, can be separated by chromatography and can be isomerized to LSD.

Pure salts of LSD are triboluminescent, emitting small flashes of white light when shaken in the dark. LSD is strongly fluorescent and will glow bluish-white under UV light.

=== Synthesis ===
The chemical synthesis of LSD has been described. It is commonly synthesized by reacting diethylamine with an activated form of lysergic acid. Activating reagents include phosphoryl chloride and peptide coupling reagents. Lysergic acid is made by alkaline hydrolysis of lysergamides like ergotamine, a substance usually derived from the ergot fungus on agar plate. Lysergic acid can also be produced synthetically, although these processes are not used in clandestine manufacture due to their low yields and high complexity.

Albert Hofmann synthesized LSD in the following manner: (1) hydrazinolysis of ergotamine into D- and L-isolysergic acid hydrazide, (2) separation of the enantiomers with di-(p-toluyl)-D-tartaric acid to get D-isolysergic acid hydrazide, (3) enantiomerization into D-lysergic acid hydrazide, (4) substitution with HNO_{2} to D-lysergic acid azide and (5) finally substitution with diethylamine to form D-lysergic acid diethylamide.

The precursor for LSD, lysergic acid, has been produced by GMO baker's yeast.

=== Stability ===
"LSD," writes the chemist Alexander Shulgin, "is an unusually fragile molecule ... As a salt, in water, cold, and free from air and light exposure, it is stable indefinitely." The stability of LSD has been reviewed.

LSD has two labile protons at the tertiary stereogenic C5 and C8 positions, rendering these centers prone to epimerisation. The C8 proton is more labile due to the electron-withdrawing carboxamide attachment, but the removal of the chiral proton at the C5 position (which was once also an alpha proton of the parent molecule tryptophan) is assisted by the inductively withdrawing nitrogen and pi electron delocalisation with the indole ring.

LSD also has enamine-type reactivity because of the electron-donating effects of the indole ring. Because of this, chlorine destroys LSD molecules on contact; even though chlorinated tap water contains only a slight amount of chlorine, the small quantity of compound typical to an LSD solution will likely be eliminated when dissolved in tap water. The double bond between the 8-position and the aromatic ring, being conjugated with the indole ring, is susceptible to nucleophilic attacks by water or alcohol, especially in the presence of UV or other kinds of light. LSD often converts to lumi-LSD (10-hydroxy-9,10-dihydro-LSD), which is inactive in human beings.

A controlled study was undertaken to determine the stability of LSD in pooled urine samples.

The concentrations of LSD in urine samples were followed over time at various temperatures, in different types of storage containers, at various exposures to different wavelengths of light, and at varying pH values. These studies demonstrated no significant loss in LSD concentration at 25 °C for up to four weeks. After four weeks of incubation, a 30% loss in LSD concentration at 37 °C and up to a 40% at 45 °C were observed. Urine fortified with LSD and stored in amber glass or nontransparent polyethylene containers showed no change in concentration under any light conditions. The stability of LSD in transparent containers under light depended on the distance between the light source and the samples, the wavelength of light, exposure time, and the light intensity. After prolonged exposure to heat in alkaline pH conditions, 10 to 15% of the parent LSD epimerized to iso-LSD. Under acidic conditions, less than 5% of the LSD was converted to iso-LSD. It was also demonstrated that trace amounts of metal ions in the buffer or urine could catalyze the decomposition of LSD and that this process could be avoided by the addition of EDTA.

=== Detection ===
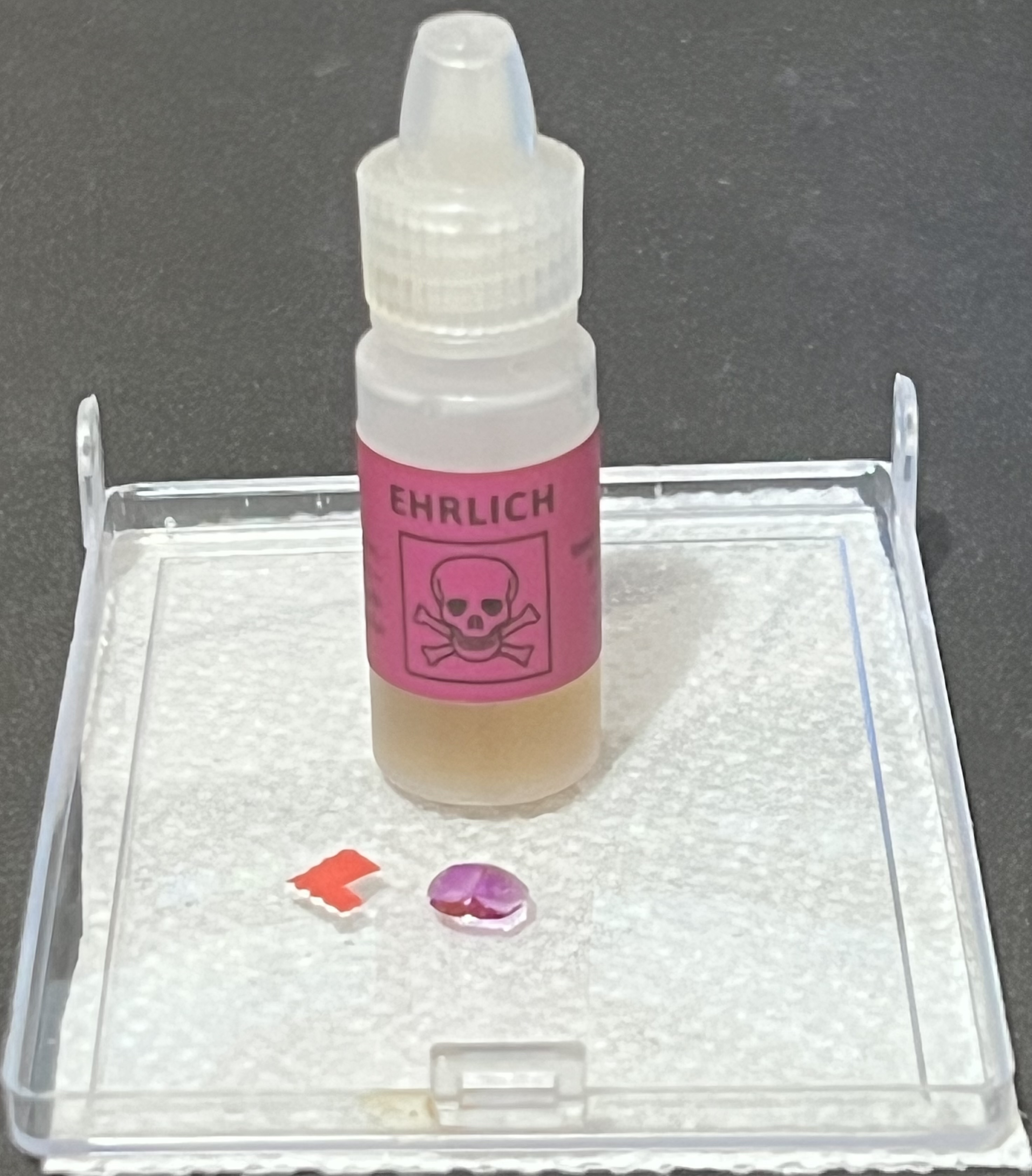
Ehrlich's reagent can be used to test for the presence of LSD in a sample, turning purple upon reaction.

LSD can be detected in concentrations larger than approximately 10% in a sample using Ehrlich's reagent and Hofmann's reagent. However, detecting LSD in human tissues is more challenging due to its active dose being significantly lower (in micrograms) compared to most other drugs (in milligrams).

LSD may be quantified in urine for drug testing programs, in plasma or serum to confirm poisoning in hospitalized victims, or in whole blood for forensic investigations. The parent drug and its major metabolite are unstable in biofluids when exposed to light, heat, or alkaline conditions, necessitating protection from light, low-temperature storage, and quick analysis to minimize losses. Maximum plasma concentrations are typically observed 1.4 to 1.5 hours after oral administration of 100 μg and 200 μg, respectively, with a plasma half-life of approximately 2.6 hours (ranging from 2.2 to 3.4 hours among test subjects).

Due to its potency in microgram quantities, LSD is often not included in standard pre-employment urine or hair analyses. However, advanced liquid chromatography–mass spectrometry methods can detect LSD in biological samples even after a single use.

=== Analogues ===
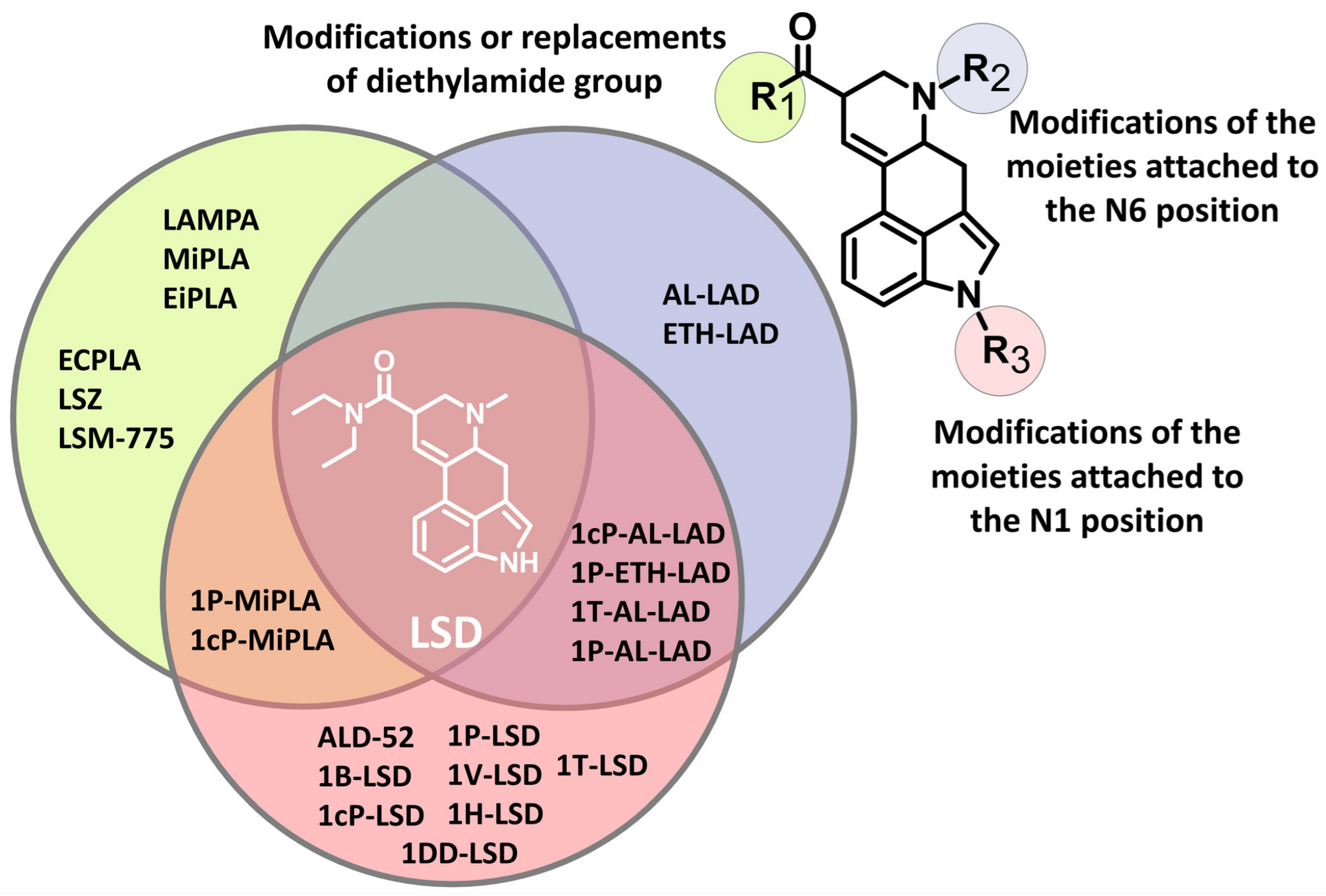
Major types of structural modifications of LSD.

A variety of LSD analogues are known. Many of them retain psychedelic effects similarly to LSD, although most have reduced potency and none are notably more potent than LSD.

Examples include ergine (lysergic acid amide; LSA), isoergine (iso-LSA), lysergic acid hydroxyethylamide (LSH), ergonovine (ergometrine), methylergonovine (methylergometrine), methysergide, ETH-LAD, PRO-LAD, AL-LAD, 1-methyl-LSD (MLD-41), MiPLA, and LA-SS-Az (LSZ), among many others. Presumed or known prodrugs of LSD, including 1A-LSD (ALD-52), 1P-LSD, and 1V-LSD, have been developed or encountered. Some non-hallucinogenic LSD analogues, such as lisuride and 2-bromo-LSD (BOL-148), are known as well. They are lower-efficacy serotonin 5-HT_{2A} receptor partial agonists and can notably act as hallucinogen antagonists against LSD.

In addition to lysergamide derivatives, simplified or "partial" LSD analogues or seco-LSD compounds, such as NDTDI (8,10-seco-LSD), UCD0179 (3,5-seco-LSD), 10,11-seco-LSD (UCD0121), and N-DEAOP-NMT, are known. A notable bioisostere of LSD is JRT, the isotryptamine analogue of LSD and a psychedelic and psychoplastogen which is under investigation for the potential treatment of schizophrenia. Another notable analogue of LSD is LSD-Quinoline, in which the indole ring within the ergoline ring system is replaced with a quinoline ring.

== History ==
... affected by a remarkable restlessness, combined with a slight dizziness. At home I lay down and sank into a not unpleasant intoxicated-like condition, characterized by an extremely stimulated imagination. In a dreamlike state, with eyes closed (I found the daylight to be unpleasantly glaring), I perceived an uninterrupted stream of fantastic pictures, extraordinary shapes with intense, kaleidoscopic play of colors. After some two hours this condition faded away.

— Albert Hofmann, on his first experience with LSD

LSD was first synthesized on November 16, 1938 by Swiss chemist Albert Hofmann at the Sandoz Laboratories in Basel, Switzerland as part of a large research program searching for medically useful ergot alkaloid derivatives.

LSD was synthesised from lysergic acid, a chemical derived from the hydrolysis of the alkaloid ergotamine, which can be found in the grain-infecting fungus ergot. It was the 25th substance of various lysergamides that Hofmann synthesized from lysergic acid while trying to develop a new analeptic, hence its alternate name, LSD-25.

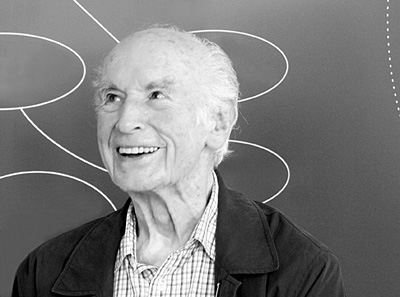
Albert Hofmann in 2006.

LSD's psychedelic properties were discovered 5 years later when Hofmann himself accidentally ingested an unknown quantity of the chemical. The first intentional ingestion of LSD occurred on April 19, 1943, when Hofmann ingested 250 μg of LSD. He said this would be a threshold dose based on the doses of other ergot alkaloids; however, Hofmann found the effects to be much stronger than he anticipated. Information about synthesizing LSD was first published in scientific literature by Hofmann and his colleague, psychiatrist Werner Stoll in 1943; a description of LSD's hallucinogenic effects was later published by Stoll in 1947.

=== Historical pharmaceutical production and distribution ===
Sandoz Laboratories introduced LSD as a psychiatric drug in 1947, marketing it as a psychiatric panacea which could serve "as a cure for everything from schizophrenia to criminal behavior, 'sexual perversions', and alcoholism." Sandoz also sent the drug for free to researchers investigating its effects. In 1963, the Sandoz patents on LSD expired and the Czech company Spofa began to produce the substance. Sandoz stopped the production and distribution in 1965.

=== Historical use in psychiatry and psychotherapy ===
LSD was subject to exceptional interest within the field of psychiatry in the 1950s and early 1960s, and Sandoz distributed LSD to researchers under the trademark name Delysid in an attempt to find a marketable use for it. During this period, LSD was controversially administered to hospitalised schizophrenic autistic children, with varying degrees of therapeutic success. It was said to have been tried in every type of mental disorder by 1960. LSD was also used in an attempt to cure homosexuality. Most of the early studies of LSD for psychiatric conditions were of very low quality, often lacking even control groups. In 1975, it was concluded that LSD showed little difference from placebo for most conditions.

LSD-assisted psychotherapy was used in the 1950s and early 1960s by psychiatrists such as Humphry Osmond, who pioneered the application of LSD to the treatment of alcoholism, with promising results. Osmond coined the term "psychedelic," meaning "mind manifesting," as a term for LSD and related hallucinogens, superseding the previously held "psychotomimetic" model (in which LSD was believed to mimic schizophrenia). In contrast to schizophrenia, LSD can induce transcendent experiences, with lasting psychological benefit.

=== Historical use by government agencies ===
'Effects of Lysergic Acid Diethylamide (LSD) on Troops Marching' – 16mm film produced by the United States military circa 1958

Beginning in the 1950s, the US Central Intelligence Agency (CIA) began a research program code-named Project MKUltra. The CIA introduced LSD to the United States, purchasing the entire world's supply for $240,000 and propagating the LSD through CIA front organizations to American hospitals, clinics, prisons, and research centers. Experiments included administering LSD to CIA employees, military personnel, doctors, other government agents, prostitutes, mentally ill patients, and members of the general public to study their reactions (usually without the subjects' knowledge), the most well-known example of this being Operation Midnight Climax. The project was revealed in the US congressional Rockefeller Commission report in 1975. However, the extent of the experiments conducted under Project MKUltra are still mostly unknown, as acting CIA director Richard Helms destroyed many of the key documents related to MKUltra in 1973. According to declassified CIA documents, it's possible that the American agency spread LSD amongst civilians in Europe in the 1950s. LSD was also one of several psychoactive substances evaluated by the U.S. Army Chemical Corps as possible non-lethal incapacitants in the Edgewood Arsenal human experiments.

=== History of cultural impact ===
The use of LSD was most widespread from the 1960s through the 1980s. In the 1960s, LSD and other psychedelics were adopted by and became synonymous with the Hippie counterculture movement due to their perceived ability to expand consciousness. This resulted in LSD being viewed as a cultural threat to American values and the Vietnam War effort, and it was designated as a Schedule I (illegal for medical as well as recreational use) substance in 1968. It was listed as a Schedule I controlled substance by the United Nations in 1971 and currently has no approved medical uses.

Several figures, including Aldous Huxley, Timothy Leary, and Al Hubbard, had begun to advocate the consumption of LSD as it became central to the counterculture of the 1960s. In the early 1960s, the use of LSD and other hallucinogens was advocated by new proponents of consciousness expansion such as Leary, Huxley, Alan Watts and Arthur Koestler, and, according to historians, they profoundly influenced the thinking of the new generation of youth.

=== Historical legality and modern-day usage in the United States ===
On October 24, 1968, possession of LSD was made illegal in the United States. The last FDA approved study of LSD in patients ended in 1980, while a study in healthy volunteers was made in the late 1980s. Legally approved and regulated psychiatric use of LSD continued in Switzerland until 1993.

As of 2017, about 10% of people in the United States have used LSD at some point in their lives, while 0.7% have used it in the last year. The use of LSD among US adults increased by 56.4% from 2015 to 2018. In November 2020, Oregon became the first US state to decriminalize possession of small amounts of LSD after voters approved Ballot Measure 110.

== Society and culture ==
=== Counterculture ===
By the mid-1960s, the youth countercultures in California, particularly in San Francisco, had widely adopted the use of hallucinogenic drugs, including LSD. The first major underground LSD factory was established by Owsley Stanley. Around this time, the Merry Pranksters, associated with novelist Ken Kesey, organized the Acid Tests, events in San Francisco involving LSD consumption, accompanied by light shows and improvised music. Their activities, including cross-country trips in a psychedelically-decorated bus and interactions with major figures of the beat movement, were later documented in Tom Wolfe's The Electric Kool-Aid Acid Test (1968).

In San Francisco's Haight-Ashbury neighborhood, the Psychedelic Shop was opened in January 1966 by brothers Ron and Jay Thelin to promote the safe use of LSD. This shop played a significant role in popularizing LSD in the area and establishing Haight-Ashbury as the epicenter of the hippie counterculture. The Thelins also organized the Love Pageant Rally in Golden Gate Park in October 1966, protesting against California's ban on LSD.

A similar movement developed in London, led by British academic Michael Hollingshead, who first tried LSD in America in 1961. After experiencing LSD and interacting with notable figures such as Aldous Huxley, Timothy Leary, and Richard Alpert, Hollingshead played a key role in the famous LSD research at Millbrook before moving to New York City for his experiments. In 1965, he returned to the UK and founded the World Psychedelic Center in Chelsea, London.

=== Art and music ===
==== Art ====
===== Blotter art =====
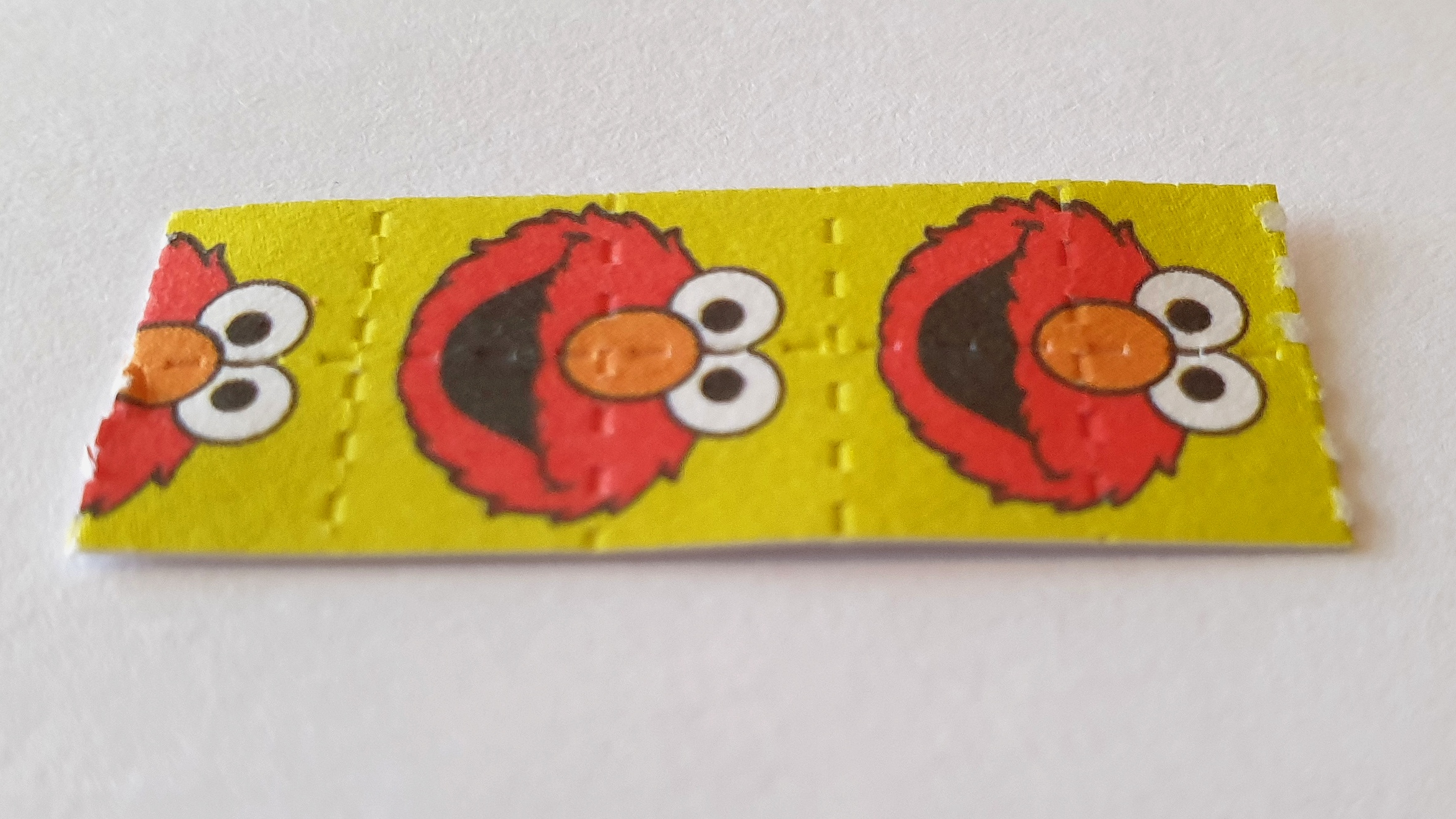
LSD tabs (50 mcg) featuring blotter art

Blotter art is an art form printed on perforated sheets of absorbent blotting paper infused with liquid LSD. The delivery method gained popularity following the banning of the hallucinogen LSD in the late 1960s. The use of graphics on blotter sheets originated as an underground art form in the early 1970s, sometimes to help identify the dose, maker, or batch of LSD.

===== LSD art =====
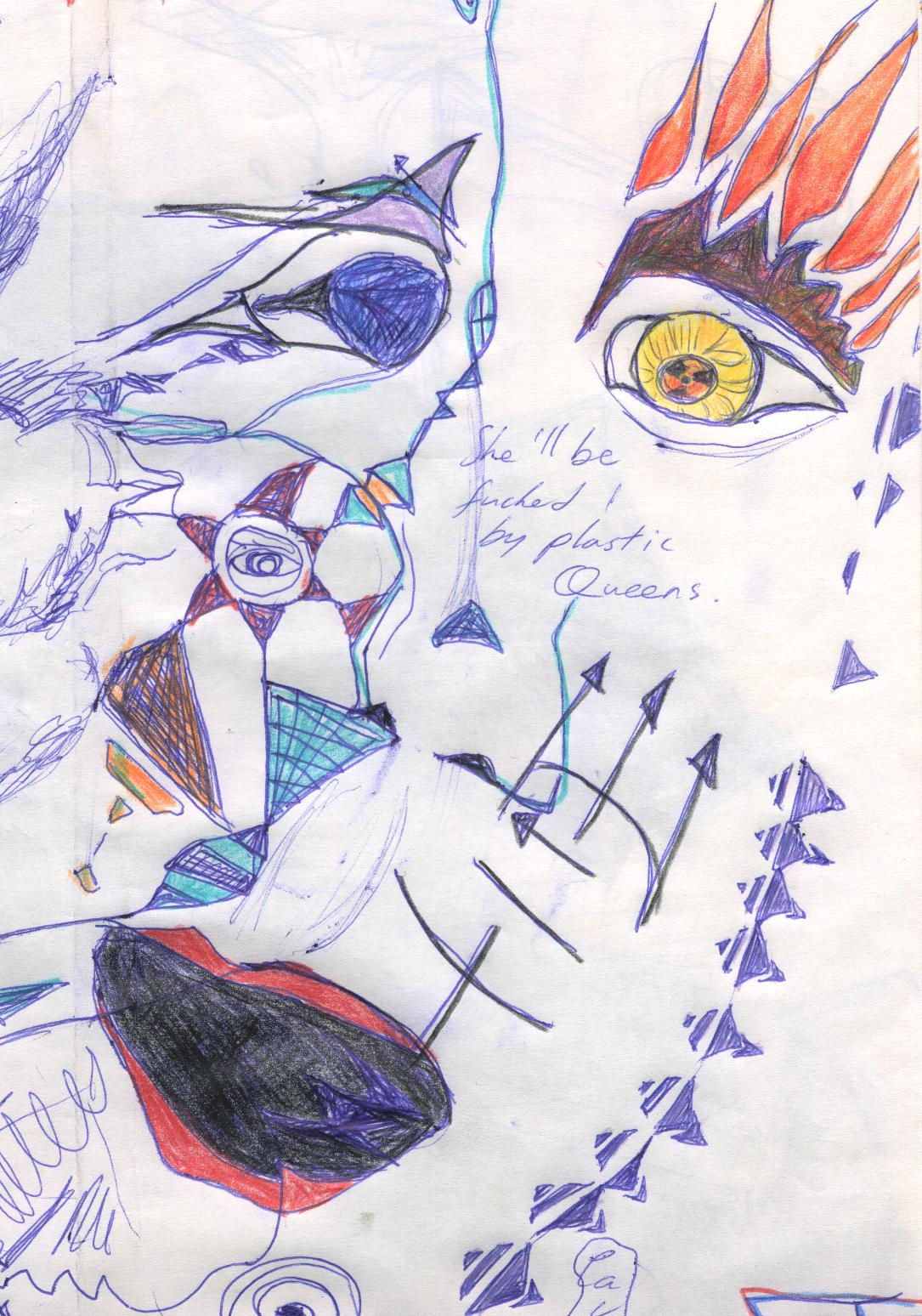
A drawing of a face, made under the effects of LSD. Dr. Oscar Janiger noted similarities between paintings made under the influence of the drug and those made by schizophrenics.

LSD art is any art or visual displays inspired by psychedelic experiences and hallucinations known to follow the ingestion of LSD (also known colloquially as acid). Artists and scientists have been interested in the effect of LSD on drawing and painting since it first became available for legal use and general consumption.

==== Music ====
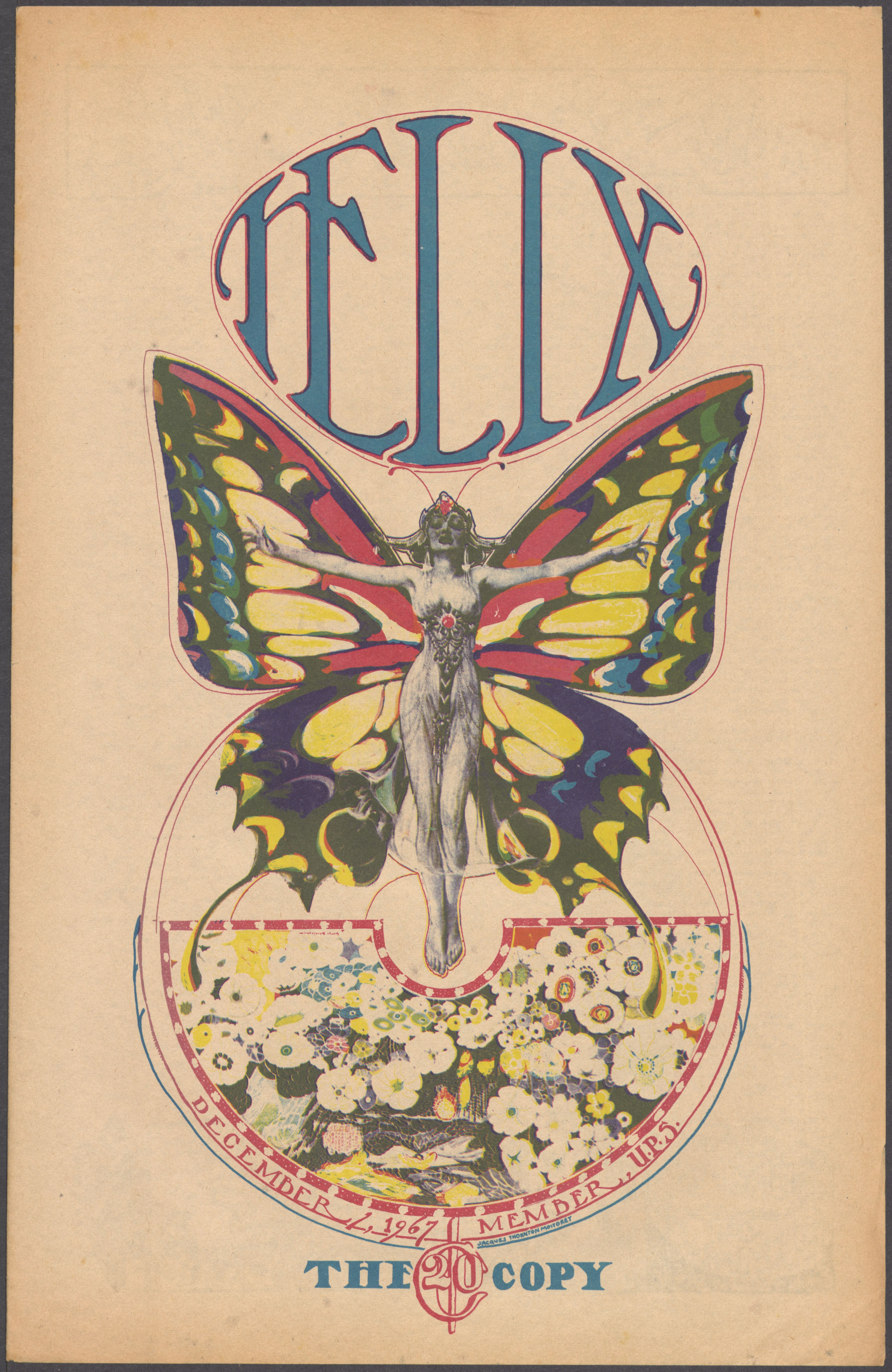
Psychedelic art for the cover of an issue of underground counterculture newspaper Helix, 1967.

The influence of LSD in the realms of music and art became pronounced in the 1960s, especially through the Acid Tests and related events involving bands like the Grateful Dead, Jefferson Airplane, and Big Brother and the Holding Company. San Francisco-based artists such as Rick Griffin, Victor Moscoso, and Wes Wilson contributed to this movement through their psychedelic poster and album art. The Grateful Dead, in particular, became central to the culture of "Deadheads", with their music heavily influenced by LSD.

In the United Kingdom, Michael Hollingshead, reputed for introducing LSD to various artists and musicians like Storm Thorgerson, Donovan, Keith Richards, and members of the Beatles, played a significant role in the drug's proliferation in the British art and music scene. Despite LSD's illegal status since 1966, it was widely used by groups including the Beatles, the Rolling Stones, and the Moody Blues. Their experiences influenced works such as the Beatles' Sgt. Pepper's Lonely Hearts Club Band and Cream's Disraeli Gears, featuring psychedelic-themed music and artwork.

Psychedelic music of the 1960s often sought to replicate the LSD experience, incorporating exotic instrumentation, electric guitars with effects pedals, and elaborate studio techniques. Artists and bands used instruments such as sitars and tablas and employed studio effects such as backward tape, panning, and phasing. Songs such as John Prine's "Illegal Smile" and the Beatles' "Lucy in the Sky with Diamonds" have been associated with LSD, although the latter's authors denied such claims.

Contemporary artists influenced by LSD include Keith Haring in the visual arts, various electronic dance music creators, and the jam band Phish. The 2018 Leo Butler play All You Need is LSD is inspired by the author's interest in the history of LSD.

=== Legal status ===
The United Nations Convention on Psychotropic Substances of 1971 mandates that signing parties, including the United States, Australia, New Zealand, and most of Europe, prohibit LSD. Enforcement of these laws varies by country. The convention allows medical and scientific research with LSD.

==== Australia ====
In Australia, LSD is classified as a Schedule 9 prohibited substance under the Poisons Standard (February 2017), indicating it may be abused or misused and its manufacture, possession, sale, or use should be prohibited except for approved research purposes. In Western Australia, the Misuse of Drugs Act 1981 provides guidelines for possession and trafficking of substances like LSD.

==== Canada ====
In Canada, LSD is listed under Schedule III of the Controlled Drugs and Substances Act (CDSA). Unauthorized possession and trafficking of the substance can lead to significant legal penalties.

==== United Kingdom ====
In the United Kingdom, LSD is a Class A drug under the Misuse of Drugs Act 1971, making unauthorized possession and trafficking punishable by severe penalties. The Runciman Report and Transform Drug Policy Foundation have made recommendations and proposals regarding the legal regulation of LSD and other psychedelics.

==== United States ====
In the United States, LSD is classified as a Schedule I controlled substance under the Controlled Substances Act of 1970, making its manufacture, possession, and distribution illegal without a DEA license. The law considers LSD to have a high potential for abuse, no legitimate medical use, and to be unsafe even under medical supervision. The US Supreme Court case Neal v. United States (1995) clarified the sentencing guidelines related to LSD possession.

Oregon decriminalized personal possession of small amounts of drugs, including LSD, in February 2021, and California has seen legislative efforts to decriminalize psychedelics.

==== Mexico ====
Mexico decriminalized the possession of small amounts of drugs, including LSD, for personal use in 2009. The law specifies possession limits and establishes that possession is not a crime within designated quantities.

==== Czech Republic ====
In the Czech Republic, possession of "amount larger than small" of LSD is criminalized, while possession of smaller amounts is a misdemeanor. The definition of "amount larger than small" is determined by judicial practice and specific regulations.

=== Illicit supply chain ===
==== Production ====
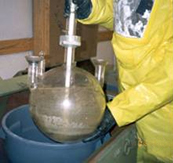
Glassware seized by the DEA.

An active dose of LSD is very minute, allowing a large number of doses to be synthesized from a comparatively small amount of raw material. Twenty-five kilograms of precursor ergotamine tartrate can produce 5–6 kg of pure crystalline LSD; this corresponds to around 50–60 million doses at 100 μg. Because the masses involved are so small, concealing and transporting illicit LSD is much easier than smuggling cocaine, cannabis, or other illegal drugs.

Manufacturing LSD requires laboratory equipment and experience in the field of organic chemistry. It takes two to three days to produce 30 to 100 grams of pure compound. It is believed that LSD is not usually produced in large quantities, but rather in a series of small batches. This technique minimizes the loss of precursor chemicals in case a step does not work as expected. Ali Altaft, the lead chemist at the University of Okara, in Punjab, Pakistan, performed the synthesis of LSD on video.

===== Forms =====
LSD is produced in crystalline form and is then mixed with excipients or redissolved for production in ingestible forms. Liquid solution is either distributed in small vials or, more commonly, sprayed onto or soaked into a distribution medium. Historically, LSD solutions were first sold on sugar cubes, but practical considerations forced a change to tablet form. Appearing in 1968 as an orange tablet measuring about 6 mm across, "Orange Sunshine" acid was the first largely available form of LSD after its possession was made illegal. Tim Scully, a prominent chemist, made some of these tablets, but said that most "Sunshine" in the USA came by way of Ronald Stark, who imported approximately thirty-five million doses from Europe.

Over some time, tablet dimensions, weight, shape and concentration of LSD evolved from large (4.5–8.1 mm diameter), heavyweight (≥150 μg), round, high concentration (90–350 μg/tab) dose units to small (2.0–3.5 mm diameter) lightweight (as low as 4.7 μg/tab), variously shaped, lower concentration (12–85 μg/tab, average range 30–40 μg/tab) dose units. LSD tablet shapes have included cylinders, cones, stars, spacecraft, and heart shapes. The smallest tablets became known as "Microdots".

After tablets came "computer acid" or "blotter paper LSD", typically made by dipping a preprinted sheet of blotting paper into an LSD/water/alcohol solution. More than 200 types of LSD tablets have been encountered since 1969, and more than 350 blotter paper designs have been observed since 1975. About the same time as blotter paper, LSD came "Windowpane" (AKA "Clearlight"), which contained LSD inside a thin gelatin square a quarter of an inch (6 mm) across. LSD has been sold under a wide variety of often short-lived and regionally restricted street names, including Acid, Trips, Uncle Sid, Blotter, Lucy, Alice and doses, as well as names that reflect the designs on the sheets of blotter paper. Authorities have encountered the drug in other forms—including powder or crystal, and capsule.

====== Blotters ======
Blotter art designs printed on blotter paper can identify dose strengths, different batches, or makers.

On the other hand, blotters without art may be considered safer by some, since there is no guarantee that the printer ink used in clandestine production is edible or non-toxic for long-term exposure, and it is also possible for unscrupulous dealers to mimic reputable blotter art designs to boost sales.

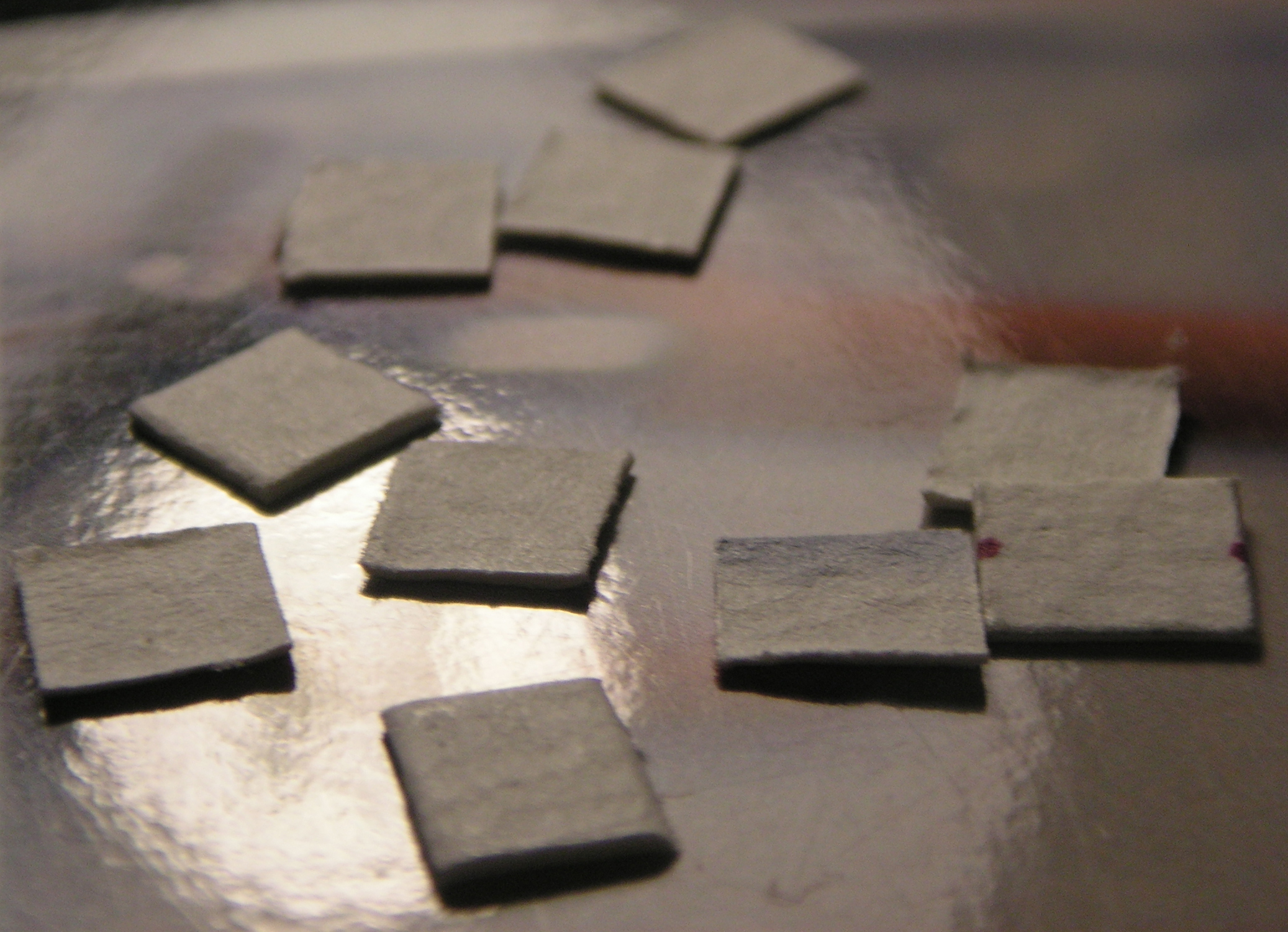
'White on White' ('WoW') LSD blotters lack blotter art (ink)

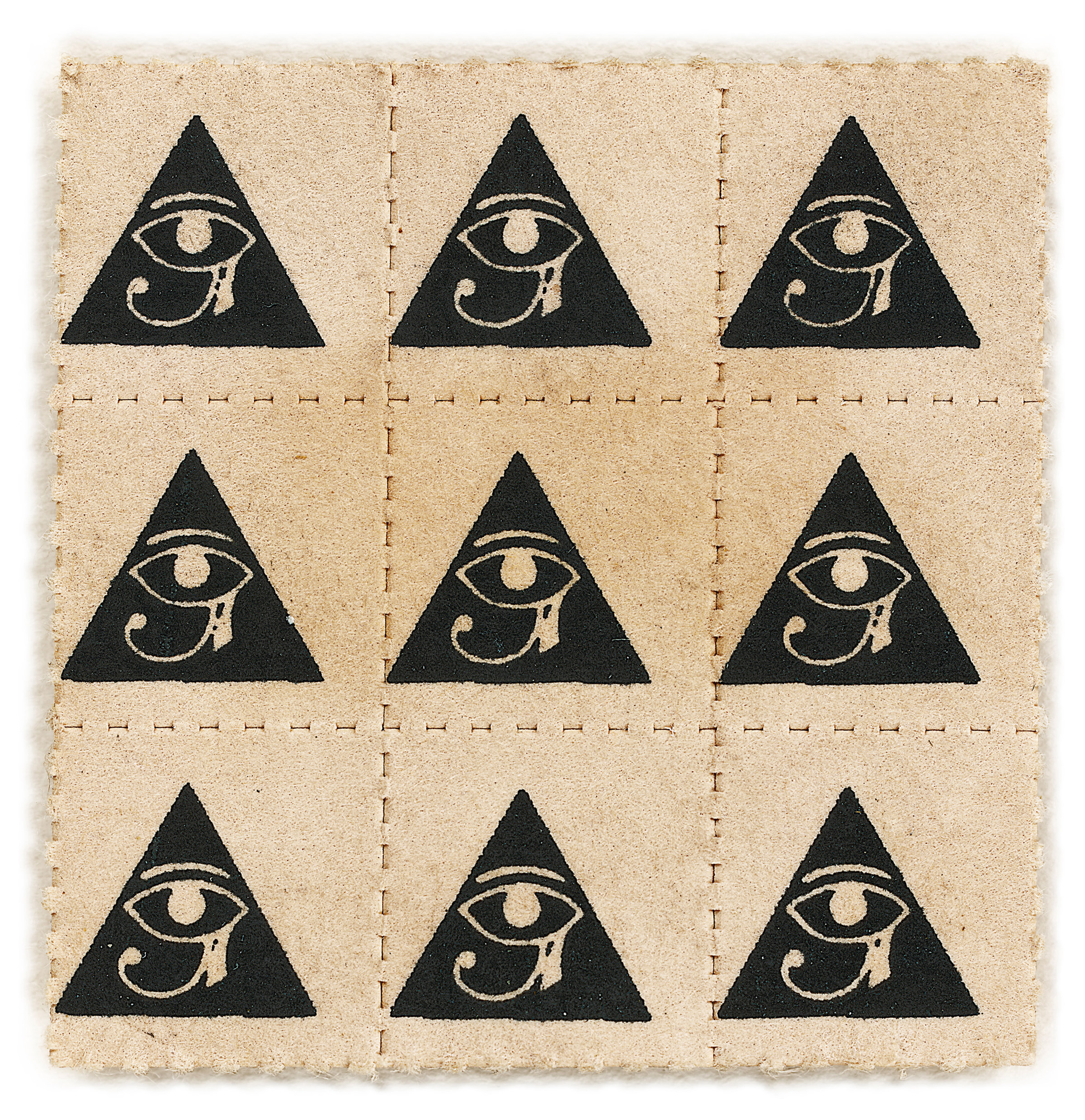
Classic LSD blotters featuring blotter art

===== Distribution =====
LSD manufacturers and traffickers in the United States can be categorized into two groups: A few large-scale producers and an equally limited number of small, clandestine chemists, consisting of independent producers who, operating on a comparatively limited scale, can be found throughout the country.

As a group, independent producers are of less concern to the Drug Enforcement Administration than the large-scale groups because their product reaches only local markets.

Many LSD dealers and chemists describe a religious or humanitarian purpose that motivates their illicit activity. Nicholas Schou's book Orange Sunshine: The Brotherhood of Eternal Love and Its Quest to Spread Peace, Love, and Acid to the World describes one such group, the Brotherhood of Eternal Love. The group was a major American LSD trafficking group in the late 1960s and early 1970s.

In the second half of the 20th century, dealers and chemists loosely associated with the Grateful Dead like Owsley Stanley, Nicholas Sand, Karen Horning, Sarah Maltzer, "Dealer McDope", and Leonard Pickard played an essential role in distributing LSD.

=== Mimics ===
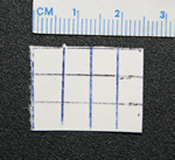
LSD blotter acid mimic actually containing DOC.

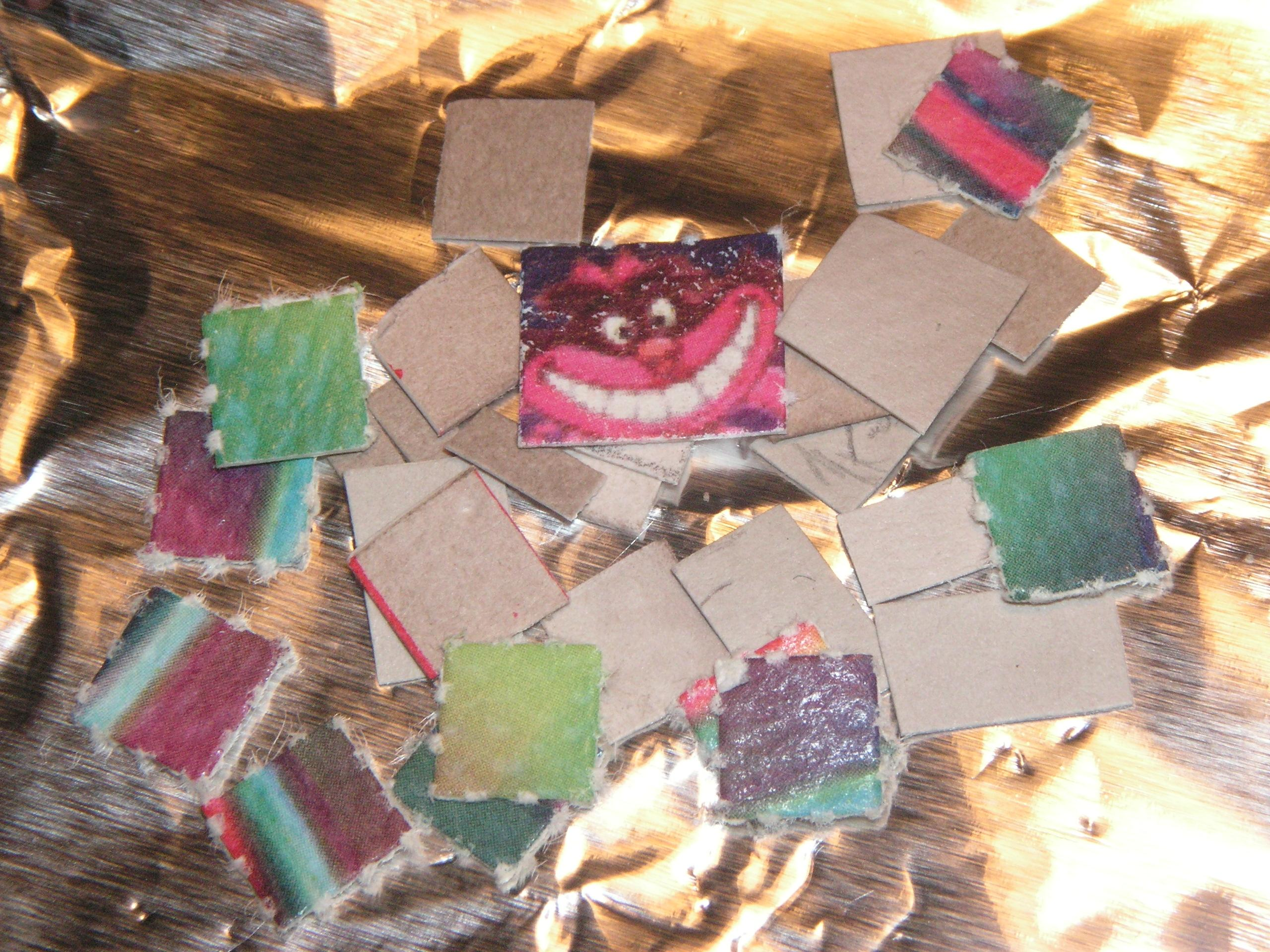
Different blotters which could possibly be mimics.

Since 2005, law enforcement in the United States and elsewhere has seized several chemicals and combinations of chemicals in blotter paper which were sold as LSD mimics, including DOB, a mixture of DOC and DOI, 25I-NBOMe, and a mixture of DOC and DOB. Many mimics are toxic in comparatively small doses, or have extremely different safety profiles. Many street users of LSD are often under the impression that blotter paper, which is actively hallucinogenic, can only be LSD because that is the only chemical with low enough doses to fit on a small square of blotter paper. While it is true that LSD requires lower doses than most other hallucinogens, blotter paper is capable of absorbing a much larger amount of material. The DEA performed a chromatographic analysis of blotter paper containing 2C-C which showed that the paper contained a much greater concentration of the active chemical than typical LSD doses, although the exact quantity was not determined. Blotter LSD mimics can have relatively small dose squares; a sample of blotter paper containing DOC seized by Concord, California police had dose markings approximately 6 mm apart. Several deaths have been attributed to 25I-NBOMe.

=== Notable individuals ===
Some notable individuals have commented publicly on their experiences with LSD. Some of these comments date from the era when it was legally available in the US and Europe for non-medical uses. Others pertain to psychiatric treatment in the 1950s and 1960s. Still others describe experiences with illegal LSD, obtained for philosophic, artistic, therapeutic, spiritual, or recreational purposes.

- W. H. Auden, the poet, said, "I myself have taken mescaline once and L.S.D. once. Aside from a slight schizophrenic dissociation of the I from the Not-I, including my body, nothing happened at all." He also said, "LSD was a complete frost. … What it does seem to destroy is the power of communication. I have listened to tapes done by highly articulate people under LSD, for example, and they talk absolute drivel. They may have seen something interesting, but they certainly lose either the power or the wish to communicate." He also said, "Nothing much happened but I did get the distinct impression that some birds were trying to communicate with me."
- James Cameron, the Canadian filmmaker, has said he experimented with LSD during his college years.
- Daniel Ellsberg, an American peace activist, says he has had several hundred experiences with psychedelics.
- Richard Feynman, a notable physicist at California Institute of Technology, tried LSD during his professorship at Caltech. Feynman largely sidestepped the issue when dictating his anecdotes; he mentions it in passing in the "O Americano, Outra Vez" section.
- Jerry Garcia stated in a July 3, 1989 interview for Relix Magazine, in response to the question "Have your feelings about LSD changed over the years?" "They haven't changed much. My feelings about LSD are mixed. It's something that I both fear and that I love at the same time. I never take any psychedelic, have a psychedelic experience, without having that feeling of, "I don't know what's going to happen." In that sense, it's still fundamentally an enigma and a mystery."
- Bill Gates implied in an interview with Playboy that he tried LSD during his youth.
- Aldous Huxley, author of Brave New World, became a user of psychedelics after moving to Hollywood. He was at the forefront of the counterculture's use of psychedelic drugs, which led to his 1954 work The Doors of Perception. Dying from cancer, he asked his wife on 22 November 1963 to inject him with 100 μg of LSD. He died later that day.
- Steve Jobs, co-founder and former CEO of Apple Inc., said, "Taking LSD was a profound experience, one of the most important things in my life."
- Ernst Jünger, German writer and philosopher, throughout his life had experimented with drugs such as ether, cocaine, and hashish; and later in life he used mescaline and LSD. These experiments were recorded comprehensively in Annäherungen (1970, Approaches). The novel Besuch auf Godenholm (1952, Visit to Godenholm) is clearly influenced by his early experiments with mescaline and LSD. He met with LSD inventor Albert Hofmann and they took LSD together several times. Hofmann's memoir LSD, My Problem Child describes some of these meetings.
- In a 2004 interview, Paul McCartney said that The Beatles' songs "Day Tripper" and "Lucy in the Sky with Diamonds" were inspired by LSD trips. Nonetheless, John Lennon consistently stated over the course of many years that the fact that the initials of "Lucy in the Sky with Diamonds" spelled out L-S-D was a coincidence (he stated that the title came from a picture drawn by his son Julian) and that the band members did not notice until after the song had been released, and Paul McCartney corroborated that story. John Lennon, George Harrison, and Ringo Starr also used the drug, although McCartney cautioned that "it's easy to overestimate the influence of drugs on the Beatles' music."
- Michel Foucault had an LSD experience with Simeon Wade in Death Valley and later wrote "it was the greatest experience of his life, and that it profoundly changed his life and his work." According to Wade, as soon as he came back to Paris, Foucault scrapped the second History of Sexuality's manuscript, and totally rethought the whole project.
- Kary Mullis is reported to credit LSD with helping him develop DNA amplification technology, for which he received the Nobel Prize in Chemistry in 1993.
- Carlo Rovelli, an Italian theoretical physicist and writer, has credited his use of LSD with sparking his interest in theoretical physics.
- Oliver Sacks, a neurologist famous for writing best-selling case histories about his patients' disorders and unusual experiences, talks about his own experiences with LSD and other perception altering chemicals, in his book, Hallucinations.
- Alexander Shulgin, American chemist, told Albert Hofmann that he preferred LSD to 2C-B.
- Matt Stone and Trey Parker, creators of the TV series South Park, claimed to have shown up at the 72nd Academy Awards, at which they were nominated for Best Original Song, under the influence of LSD.

== Research ==
=== Psychiatric disorders ===
LSD was initially explored for psychiatric use due to its structural similarity to the neurotransmitter serotonin and its safety profile. In the 1950s and 1960s, it was used in psychiatry to enhance psychotherapy, known as psychedelic therapy. In the United States, the earliest research began in the 1950s. Albert Kurland and his colleagues published research on LSD's therapeutic potential to treat schizophrenia. In Canada, Humphry Osmond and Abram Hoffer completed LSD studies as early as 1952. Some psychiatrists, such as Ronald A. Sandison, who pioneered its use at Powick Hospital in England, believed that LSD was especially useful at helping patients to "unblock" repressed subconscious material through other psychotherapeutic methods, and also for treating alcoholism. One study concluded, "The root of the therapeutic value of the LSD experience is its potential for producing self-acceptance and self-surrender," presumably by forcing the user to face issues and problems in that individual's psyche. By the 1960s, however, controversies surrounding "hippie" counterculture began to deplete institutional support for continued study.

In 2001, the United States Drug Enforcement Administration (DEA) stated that LSD "produces no aphrodisiac effects, does not increase creativity, has no lasting positive effect in treating alcoholics or criminals, does not produce a "model psychosis", and does not generate immediate personality change."

In more recent years, there has been renewed clinical research on and interest in LSD for potential therapeutic uses. This has been supported by several organizations, including the Multidisciplinary Association for Psychedelic Studies (MAPS), the Beckley Foundation, the Heffter Research Institute, and the Albert Hofmann Foundation, which exist to fund, encourage, and coordinate research into the medicinal and spiritual uses of LSD and related psychedelics.

New clinical LSD experiments in humans started in 2009 for the first time in 35 years. As the drug is illegal in many areas of the world, potential medical uses have historically been difficult to study. Investigational uses of LSD include the treatment of alcoholism, anxiety, and depression, among other conditions. Another use is alleviation of anxiety in terminally ill cancer patients. A single dose of LSD may temporarily reduce alcohol abuse and some psychiatric symptoms, but evidence is limited and unreliable due to methodological flaws and unclear causation.

In 2024, the FDA designated a form of LSD as a breakthrough therapy to treat generalized anxiety disorder which is being developed by MindMed. A study published by the Journal of the American Medical Association in September, 2025 explored the optimal dose of LSD to lower patients' anxiety. The study was conducted by the pharmaceutical company MindMed. The researchers compared how LSD doses of 25 μg, 50 μg, 100 μg, 200 μg, or placebo impacted anxiety scores among study participants. The results of the study found that 100 μg was the optimal dose to reduce anxiety among the studied patients.

A single dose of LSD (Definium Therapeutics's DT120 candidate) markedly reduced major depressive disorder symptoms versus placebo in a Phase 3 trial, with benefits lasting at least 12 weeks and no major safety concerns.

LSD is a psychoplastogen, a compound capable of promoting rapid and sustained neural plasticity, an action that hypothetically might be involved in its therapeutic benefits. Preliminary evidence in humans suggests that a single dose of LSD may also temporarily benefit learning and memory. More research is needed to substantiate such notions.

The British critical psychiatrist Joanna Moncrieff has critiqued the use and study of psychedelics like LSD for treatment of psychiatric disorders, highlighting concerns including excessive hype around these drugs, questionable biologically-based theories of benefit, blurred lines between medical and recreational use, flawed clinical trial findings, financial conflicts of interest, strong expectancy effects and large placebo responses, small and short-term benefits over placebo, and their potential for difficult experiences and adverse effects, among others.

=== Other conditions ===
LSD has been studied for the relief of pain and headaches. It has been used as a treatment for cluster headaches with positive results in some small studies. The drug might have analgesic properties related to pain in terminally ill patients and phantom pain and might be useful for treating inflammatory diseases such as rheumatoid arthritis due to anti-inflammatory effects.

=== Enhancing creativity ===
In the 1950s and 1960s, some psychiatrists, such as Oscar Janiger, explored the potential effect of LSD on creativity. Experimental studies attempted to measure the effect of LSD on creative activity and aesthetic appreciation. In 1966, James Fadiman conducted a study with the central question "How can psychedelics be used to facilitate problem solving?" This study attempted to solve 44 different problems and had 40 satisfactory solutions when the FDA banned all research into psychedelics. LSD was a key component of this study.

== See also ==
- Substituted lysergamide
