= L-Iso-LSD =

l-Iso-LSD

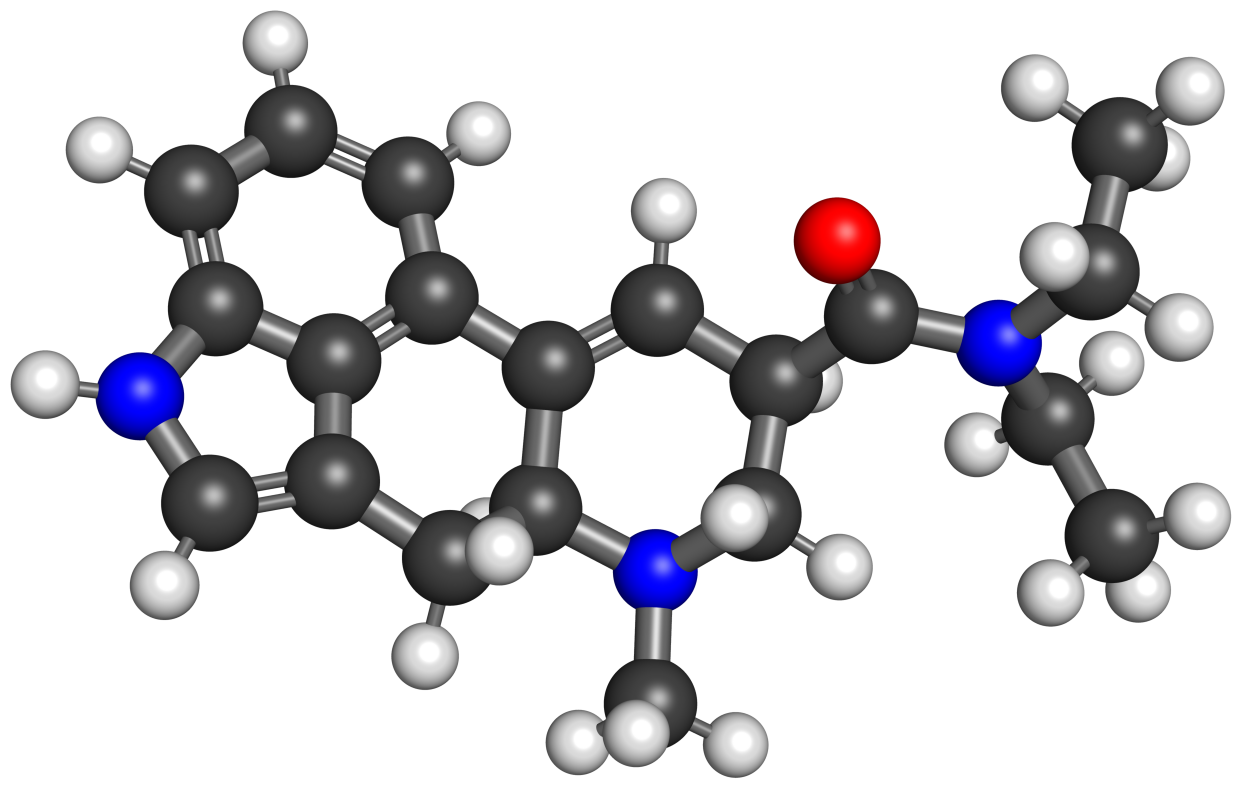

Clinical data
- Other names: (–)-Iso-LSD; (5S,8R)-Iso-LSD; levo-Iso-LSD; l-Isolysergic acid diethylamide; N,N-Diethyl-6-methyl-9,10-didehydro-5α-ergoline-8β-carboxamide
- ATC code: None

Identifiers
- IUPAC name: (6aS,9R)-N,N-Diethyl-7-methyl-4,6,6a,7,8,9-hexahydroindolo[4,3-fg]quinoline-9-carboxamide
- PubChem CID: 56841613
- ChemSpider: 32809688

Chemical and physical data
- Formula: C_{20}H_{25}N_{3}O
- Molar mass: 323.440 g·mol^{−1}
- 3D model (JSmol): Interactive image
- SMILES: CCN(CC)C(=O)[C@H]1CN([C@H]2CC3=CNC4=CC=CC(=C34)C2=C1)C
- InChI: InChI=1S/C20H25N3O/c1-4-23(5-2)20(24)14-9-16-15-7-6-8-17-19(15)13(11-21-17)10-18(16)22(3)12-14/h6-9,11,14,18,21H,4-5,10,12H2,1-3H3/t14-,18+/m1/s1; Key:VAYOSLLFUXYJDT-KDOFPFPSSA-N

l-Iso-LSD, also known as (–)-iso-LSD or (5S,8R)-iso-LSD, as well as l-isolysergic acid diethylamide, is a lysergamide and one of four possible stereoisomers of the lysergic acid diethylamide (LSD) molecule (with the psychedelic drug actually being the enantiopure d-isomer).

The LSD molecule has two chiral centers at carbons 5 and 8 of the ergoline ring system and hence there are four possible enantiomeric stereoisomers of LSD. l-Iso-LSD, also known as (–)-iso-LSD or (5S,8R)-iso-LSD, is one of four possible stereoisomers. The other isomers are LSD (d-LSD, (+)-LSD, or (5R,8R)-LSD), iso-LSD (d-iso-LSD, (+)-iso-LSD, or (5R-8S)-LSD), and l-LSD ((–)-LSD or (5S,8S)-LSD). None of them are known to have significant psychoactivity in humans besides LSD.

l-Iso-LSD showed only 0.1% of the antiserotonergic activity of LSD in the isolated rat uterus. Hence, it was about 1,000-fold less potent than LSD in this assay and was regarded as essentially inactive.

l-Iso-LSD showed no psychedelic effects in humans at a dose of up to 500 μg orally or up to 20 times the minimum effective dose of LSD (~25 μg). According to Albert Hofmann, the only effect of l-iso-LSD at a dose of 500 μg was mild nausea.

l-Iso-LSD was first described in the scientific literature by at least the 1950s.

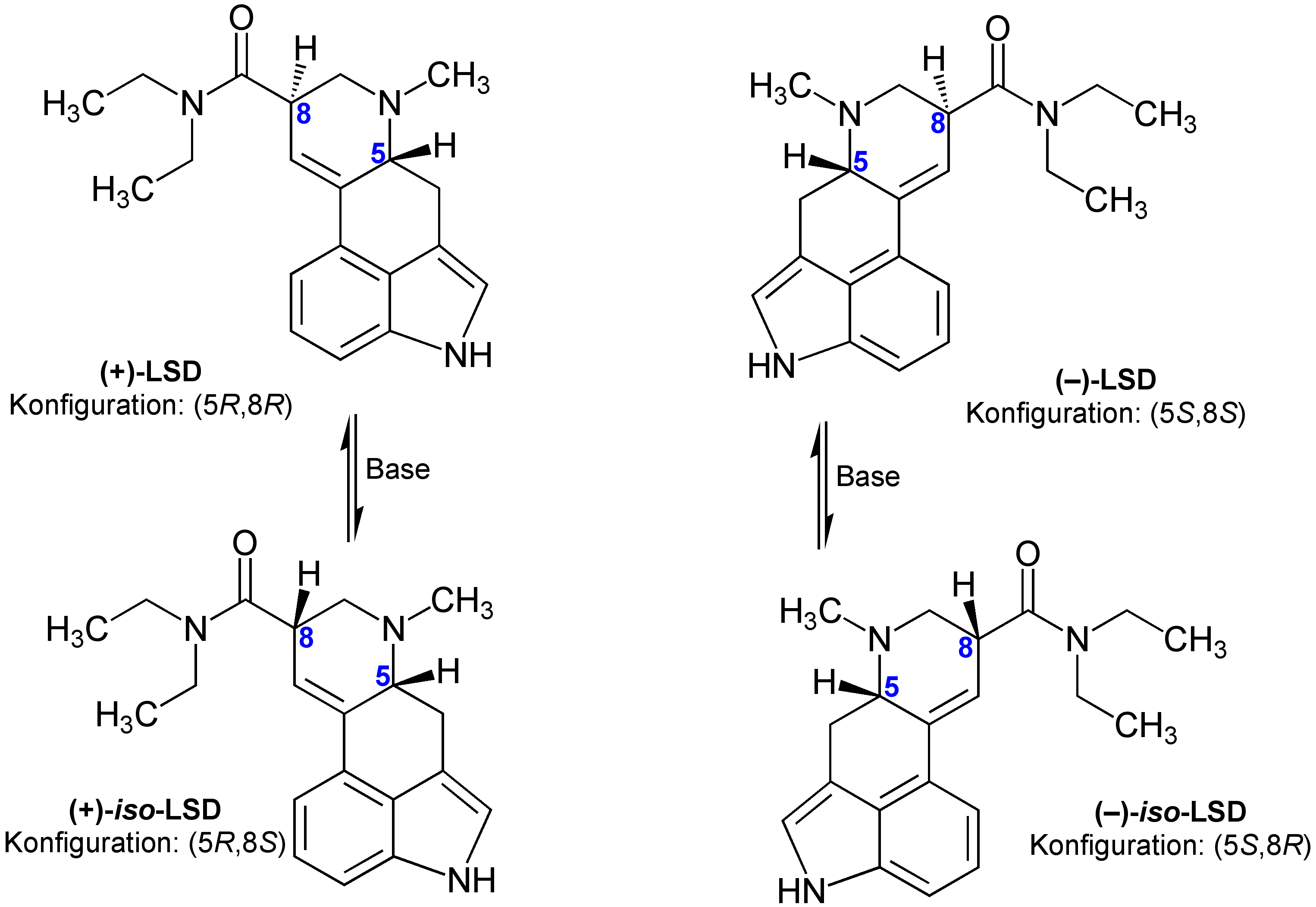
Chemical structures of LSD and its three stereoisomers, including l-iso-LSD ((–)-iso-LSD).

== See also ==
- Substituted lysergamide
