= L-LSD =

l-LSD

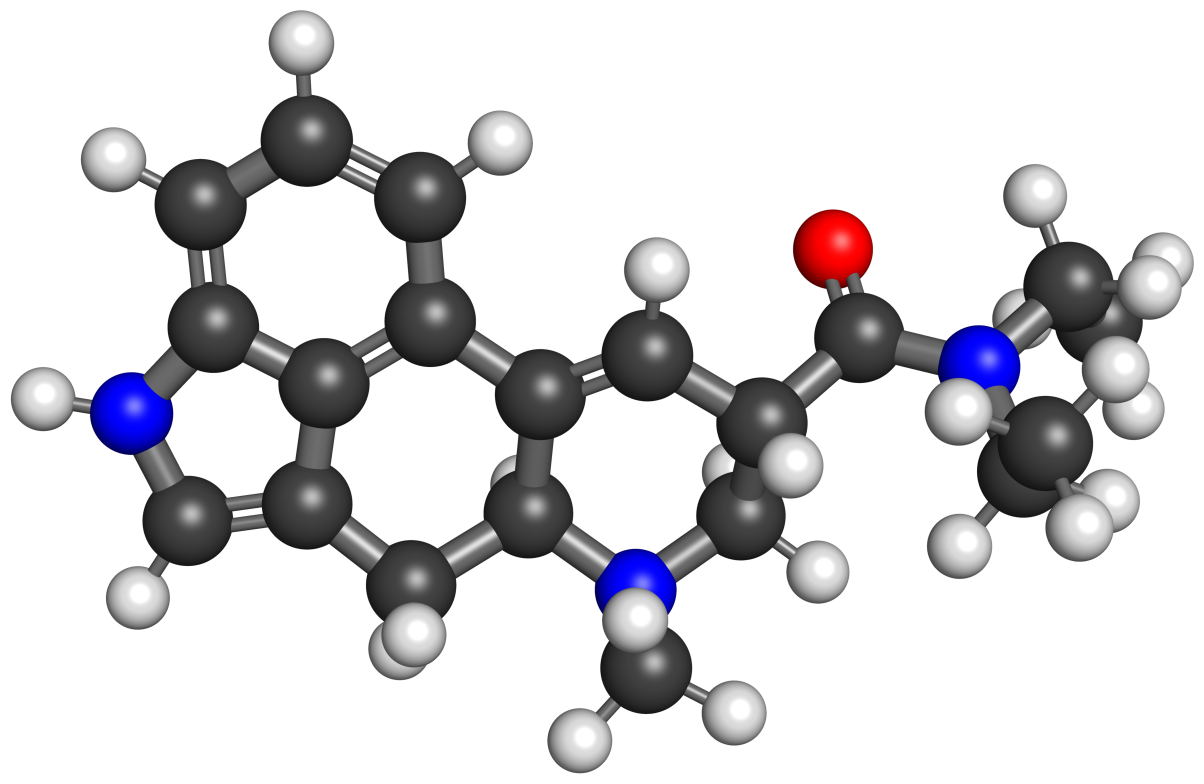

Clinical data
- Other names: (–)-LSD; (5S,8S)-LSD; levo-LSD; l-Lysergic acid diethylamide; l-Lysergide; N,N-Diethyl-6-methyl-9,10-didehydro-5α-ergoline-8α-carboxamide
- ATC code: None

Identifiers
- IUPAC name: (6aS,9S)-N,N-diethyl-7-methyl-6,6a,8,9-tetrahydro-4H-indolo[4,3-fg]quinoline-9-carboxamide
- CAS Number: 3184-49-4
- PubChem CID: 6098175
- ChemSpider: 32697881
- UNII: 5S94F6A36E
- CompTox Dashboard (EPA): DTXSID80185703

Chemical and physical data
- Formula: C_{20}H_{25}N_{3}O
- Molar mass: 323.440 g·mol^{−1}
- 3D model (JSmol): Interactive image
- SMILES: CCN(CC)C(=O)[C@@H]1CN([C@H]2CC3=CNC4=CC=CC(=C34)C2=C1)C
- InChI: InChI=1S/C20H25N3O/c1-4-23(5-2)20(24)14-9-16-15-7-6-8-17-19(15)13(11-21-17)10-18(16)22(3)12-14/h6-9,11,14,18,21H,4-5,10,12H2,1-3H3/t14-,18-/m0/s1; Key:VAYOSLLFUXYJDT-KSSFIOAISA-N

l-LSD, also known as (–)-LSD or (5S,8S)-LSD, as well as l-lysergic acid diethylamide or l-lysergide, is a lysergamide and one of four possible stereoisomers of the lysergic acid diethylamide (LSD) molecule (with the psychedelic drug actually being the enantiopure d-isomer).

The LSD molecule has two chiral centers at carbons 5 and 8 of the ergoline ring system and hence there are four possible enantiomeric stereoisomers of LSD. l-LSD, also known as (–)-LSD or (5S,8S)-LSD, is one of four possible stereoisomers. The other isomers are LSD (d-LSD, (+)-LSD, or (5R,8R)-LSD), iso-LSD (d-iso-LSD, (+)-iso-LSD, or (5R-8S)-LSD), and l-iso-LSD ((–)-iso LSD or (5S,8R)-iso-LSD). None of them are known to have significant psychoactivity in humans besides LSD.

l-LSD showed only 0.06% of the antiserotonergic activity of LSD in the isolated rat uterus. Hence, it was more than 1,000-fold less potent than LSD in this assay and was regarded as essentially inactive. In subsequent receptor binding studies, l-LSD showed 2,000- to 10,000-fold lower affinity for serotonin receptors than LSD. It failed to substitute for LSD in rodent drug discrimination tests, suggesting that it would not produce psychedelic effects in humans.

l-LSD showed no psychedelic effects in humans at a dose of up to 10 mg orally or up to 400 times the minimum effective dose of LSD (~25 μg). However, Albert Hofmann reported that although l-LSD produced no LSD-like effects, it caused "very slight drowsiness" at doses above 500 μg.

l-LSD was first described in the scientific literature by at least the 1950s.

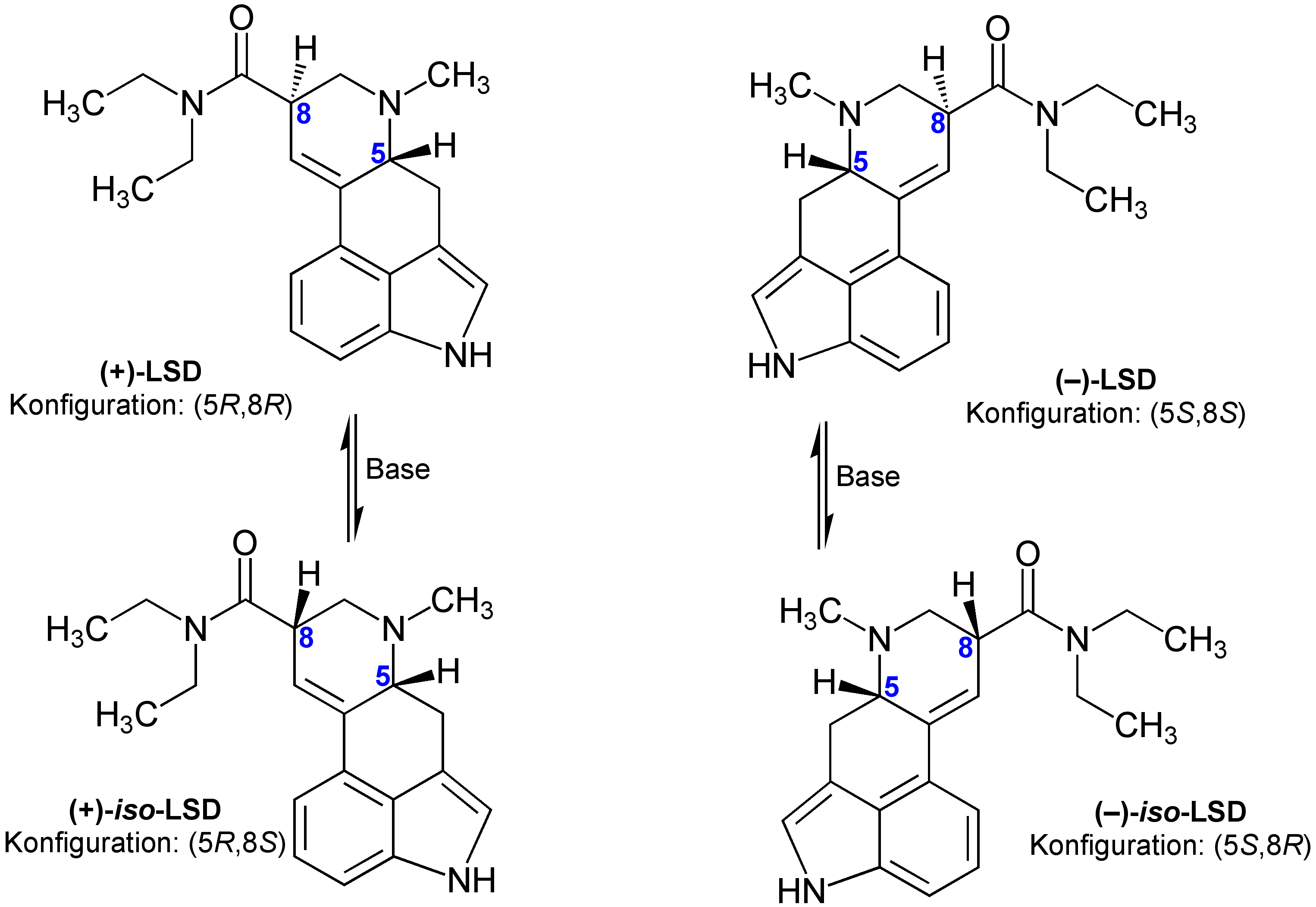
Chemical structures of LSD and its three stereoisomers, including l-LSD ((–)-LSD).

== See also ==
- Substituted lysergamide
