= Iso-LSD =

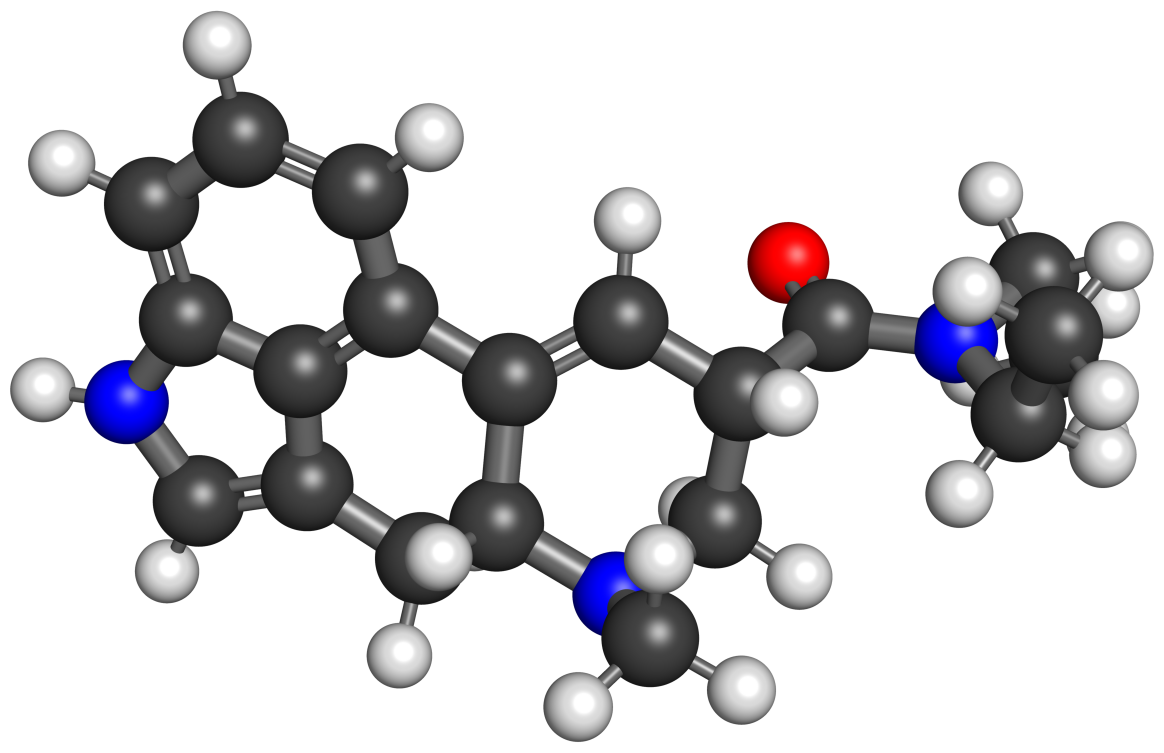

Clinical data
- Other names: IsoLSD; I-LSD; d-Iso-LSD; (+)-Iso-LSD; (5R-8S)-LSD; Isolysergic acid diethylamide; N,N-Diethylisolysergamide; iso-Lysergic acid diethylamide; N,N-Diethyl-6-methyl-9,10-didehydroergoline-8α-carboxamide; d-Isolysergic acid diethylamide
- Routes of administration: Oral
- Drug class: Serotonin receptor modulator
- ATC code: None

Pharmacokinetic data
- Elimination half-life: 12 hours

Identifiers
- IUPAC name: (6aR,9S)-N,N-diethyl-7-methyl-6,6a,8,9-tetrahydro-4H-indolo[4,3-fg]quinoline-9-carboxamide
- CAS Number: 2126-78-5
- PubChem CID: 638252
- IUPHAR/BPS: 154
- ChemSpider: 553804
- UNII: R1XBQ6NTFR
- CompTox Dashboard (EPA): DTXSID30858950
- ECHA InfoCard: 100.387.572

Chemical and physical data
- Formula: C_{20}H_{25}N_{3}O
- Molar mass: 323.440 g·mol^{−1}
- 3D model (JSmol): Interactive image
- SMILES: CCN(CC)C(=O)[C@@H]1CN([C@@H]2CC3=CNC4=CC=CC(=C34)C2=C1)C
- InChI: InChI=1S/C20H25N3O/c1-4-23(5-2)20(24)14-9-16-15-7-6-8-17-19(15)13(11-21-17)10-18(16)22(3)12-14/h6-9,11,14,18,21H,4-5,10,12H2,1-3H3/t14-,18+/m0/s1; Key:VAYOSLLFUXYJDT-KBXCAEBGSA-N

Iso-LSD, also known as d-iso-LSD, (+)-iso-LSD, or (5R-8S)-LSD, as well as N,N-diethylisolysergamide, is a serotonin receptor modulator of the lysergamide family related to lysergic acid diethylamide (LSD). It is the 8-position epimer of LSD, with iso-LSD being 8α (8S) and LSD being 8β (8R). Iso-LSD is also the N,N-diethyl derivative of isoergine (isolysergic acid amide; iso-LSA), a constituent found in morning glory seeds. Iso-LSD is one of four possible stereoisomers of LSD.

== Use and effects ==
According to Albert Hofmann and colleagues, iso-LSD is inactive as a psychedelic in humans at doses of up to 500 μg, which is up to 25 times the minimum given doses of LSD (i.e., 20–50 μg). In other sources, iso-LSD was also stated as being inactive at doses of up to 50 μg/kg (3.5 mg for a 70-kg person), whereas LSD is active at a dose of 1 μg/kg (70 μg for a 70-kg person). Hence, iso-LSD is inactive in humans at doses of up to 50 times those of a common psychedelic dose of LSD and at doses of up to 175 times the minimum dose of LSD. Alexander Shulgin has additionally reported that iso-LSD was inactive at a dose of 4 mg orally. The related drug isoergine is known to be active in terms of psychoactive and hallucinogenic effects at doses of 2 to 5 mg orally.

== Pharmacology ==
=== Pharmacodynamics ===
Iso-LSD shows significant affinity for serotonin receptors. It had an affinity (IC_{50}) of about 200 nM for serotonin receptors in rat brain membranes. For comparison, LSD had an affinity of about 8 to 10 nM in the studies, while isoergine had an affinity of 100 to 200 nM and ergine (LSA) had an affinity of about 200 nM. Hence, iso-LSD showed about 10- to 30-fold lower affinity for serotonin receptors than LSD but had similar affinity for the receptors as ergine and isoergine. Despite these findings however, iso-LSD showed only 0.12% of the antiserotonergic activity of LSD (~1,000-fold lower in comparison) in the isolated rat uterus.

In studies by David E. Nichols and colleagues, iso-LSD fully substituted for LSD in rodent drug discrimination tests. Full substitution occurred at a dose of 0.32 mg/kg and its ED_{50} was 0.14 mg/kg, whereas the LSD training dose was 0.08 mg/kg. Iso-LSD was about 7 times less potent than LSD in terms of ED_{50} in this assay. In other studies, the drug had about 3.7% of the toxic potency of LSD in rabbits (presumably in terms of LD_{50}) and, unlike LSD, was not pyretogenic.

=== Pharmacokinetics ===
Iso-LSD is said to have identical metabolism to LSD. It has a longer elimination half-life than LSD. Iso-LSD's half-life was 12 hours while LSD's half-life was 4.2 hours.

== Chemistry ==
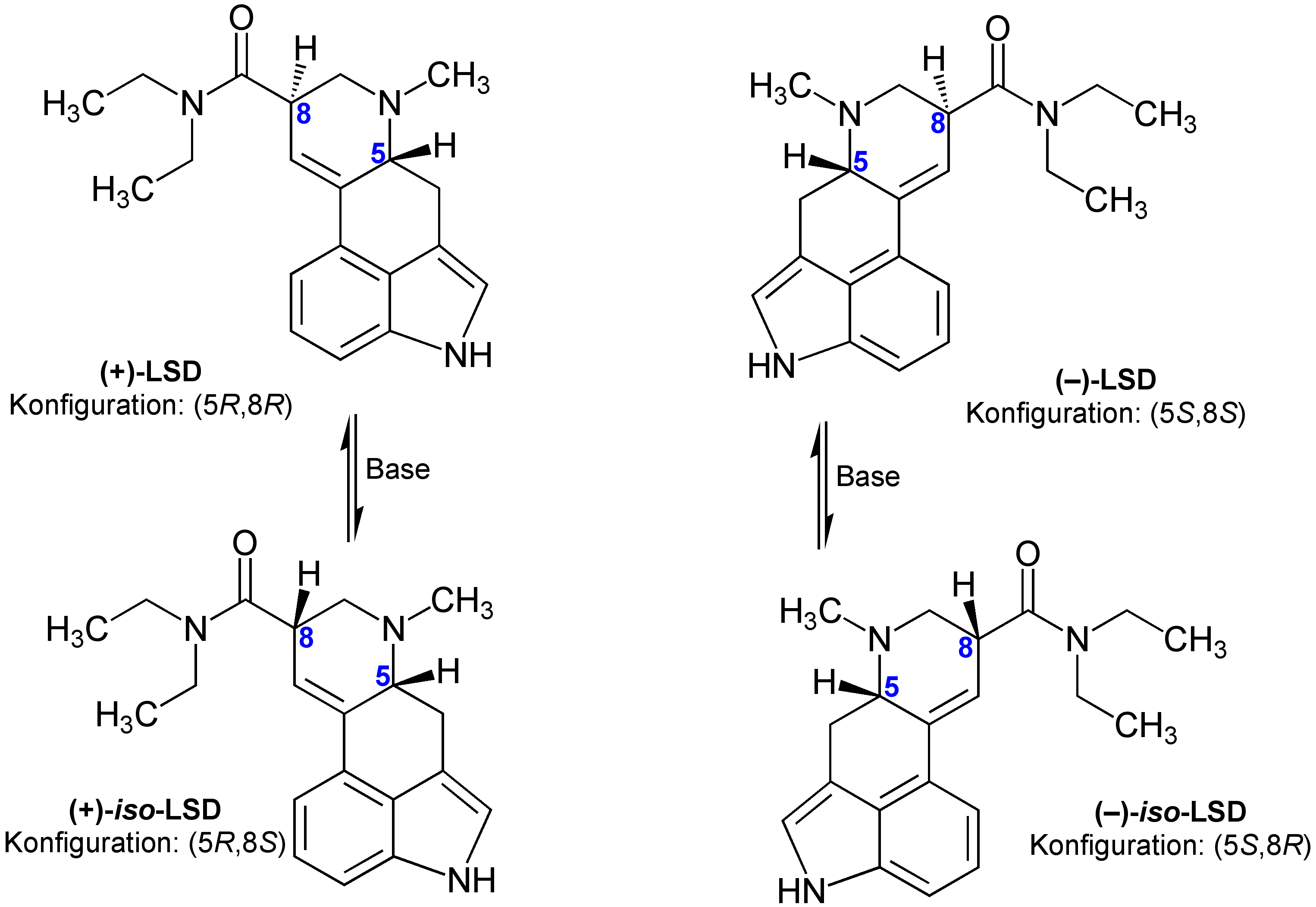
Chemical structures of LSD and its three stereoisomers, including iso-LSD ((+)-iso-LSD).

The LSD molecule has two chiral centers at carbons 5 and 8 of the ergoline ring system and hence there are four possible enantiomeric stereoisomers of LSD. Iso-LSD, also known as d-iso-LSD, (+)-iso-LSD, or (5R-8S)-LSD, is one of four possible stereoisomers. The other isomers are LSD (d-LSD, (+)-LSD, or (5R,8R)-LSD), l-iso-LSD ((–)-iso-LSD or (5S,8R)-iso-LSD), and l-LSD ((–)-LSD or (5S,8S)-LSD). None of them are known to have significant psychoactivity in humans besides LSD.

LSD is easily epimerized into iso-LSD with base. Consequently, iso-LSD is a common synthetic contaminant in chemical synthesis of LSD. Iso-LSD can be easily epimerized back into LSD. LSD can degrade into iso-LSD depending on temperature, solvent and pH, among other factors. In clinical studies, up to 30% of LSD administered in capsules has been found to isomerize into iso-LSD.

Iso-LSD is said to be a metabolite of LSD in animals and humans. However, according to other sources, iso-LSD not a metabolite of LSD but is instead only a contaminant.

== History ==
Iso-LSD was first described in the scientific literature, by Albert Hofmann and colleagues, in the 1940s. The psychedelic effects of LSD were discovered by Hofmann in 1943 when he was using column chromatography to separate LSD from iso-LSD that had resulted as an impurity during the synthesis of LSD.

== See also ==
- Substituted lysergamide
- Lumi-LSD
