= 1-Dimethylaminomethyl-LSD =

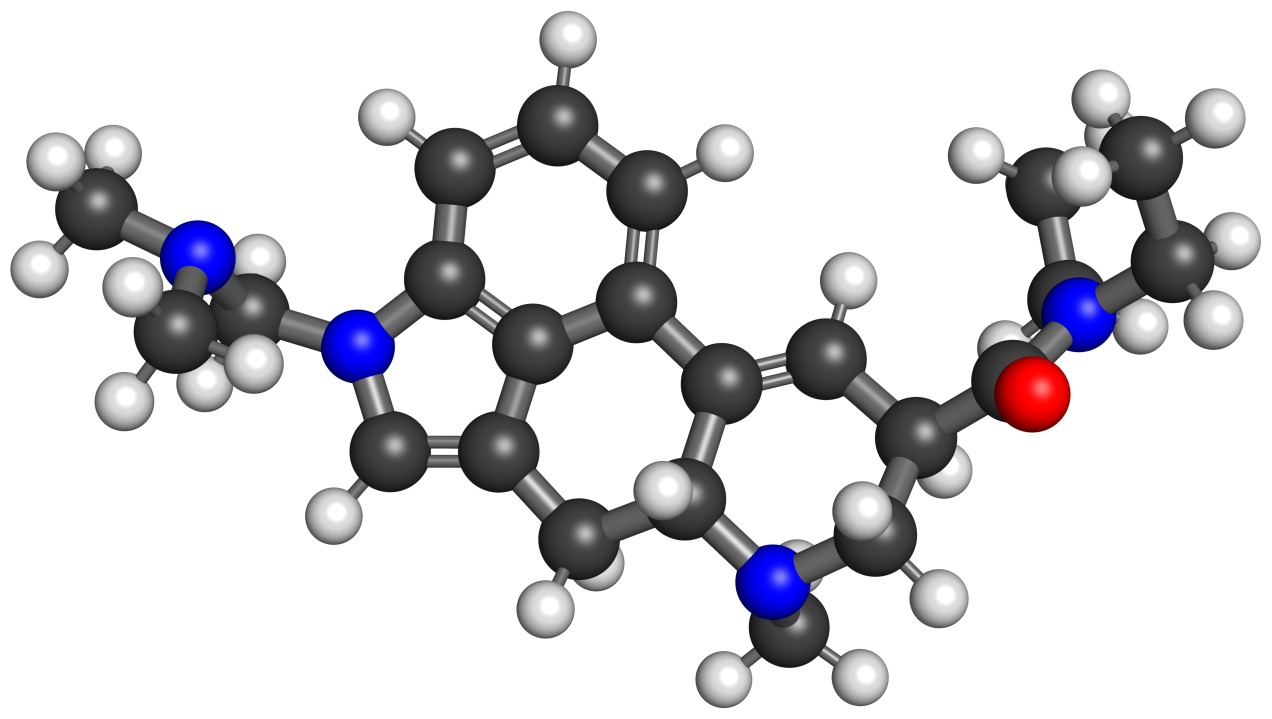

Clinical data
- Other names: 1-Dimethylaminomethyl-N,N-diethyllysergamide; 1-[(Dimethylamino)methyl]-N,N-diethyl-6-methyl-9,10-didehydroergoline-8β-carboxamide
- ATC code: None

Identifiers
- IUPAC name: (6aR,9R)-4-[(dimethylamino)methyl]-N,N-diethyl-7-methyl-4,6,6a,7,8,9-hexahydroindolo[4,3-fg]quinoline-9-carboxamide

Chemical and physical data
- Formula: C_{23}H_{32}N_{4}O
- Molar mass: 380.536 g·mol^{−1}
- 3D model (JSmol): Interactive image
- SMILES: CCN(C(=O)[C@H]1CN(C)[C@H]2C(=C1)c1cccc3c1c(C2)cn3CN(C)C)CC
- InChI: InChI=1S/C23H32N4O/c1-6-26(7-2)23(28)17-11-19-18-9-8-10-20-22(18)16(12-21(19)25(5)13-17)14-27(20)15-24(3)4/h8-11,14,17,21H,6-7,12-13,15H2,1-5H3/t17-,21-/m1/s1; Key:NSFZERINUKJKQV-DYESRHJHSA-N

1-Dimethylaminomethyl-LSD is a lysergamide derivative related to the psychedelic drug lysergic acid diethylamide (LSD). It was synthesized and described by Albert Hofmann and Franz Troxler at Sandoz in 1957. According to Alexander Shulgin in his 1997 book TiHKAL (Tryptamines I Have Known and Loved), 1-dimethylaminomethyl-LSD has been limitedly described, and it is unknown whether it was ever tested in humans. The 2-dimethylaminomethyl-LSD positional isomer has also been described, and was found to have 18.5% of the antiserotonergic activity of LSD in vitro.

== See also ==
- Substituted lysergamide
- OML-632 (1-hydroxymethyl-LSD)
- MLD-41 (1-methyl-LSD)
- ALD-52 (1-acetyl-LSD)
