= 1-Methyl-2-iodo-LSD =

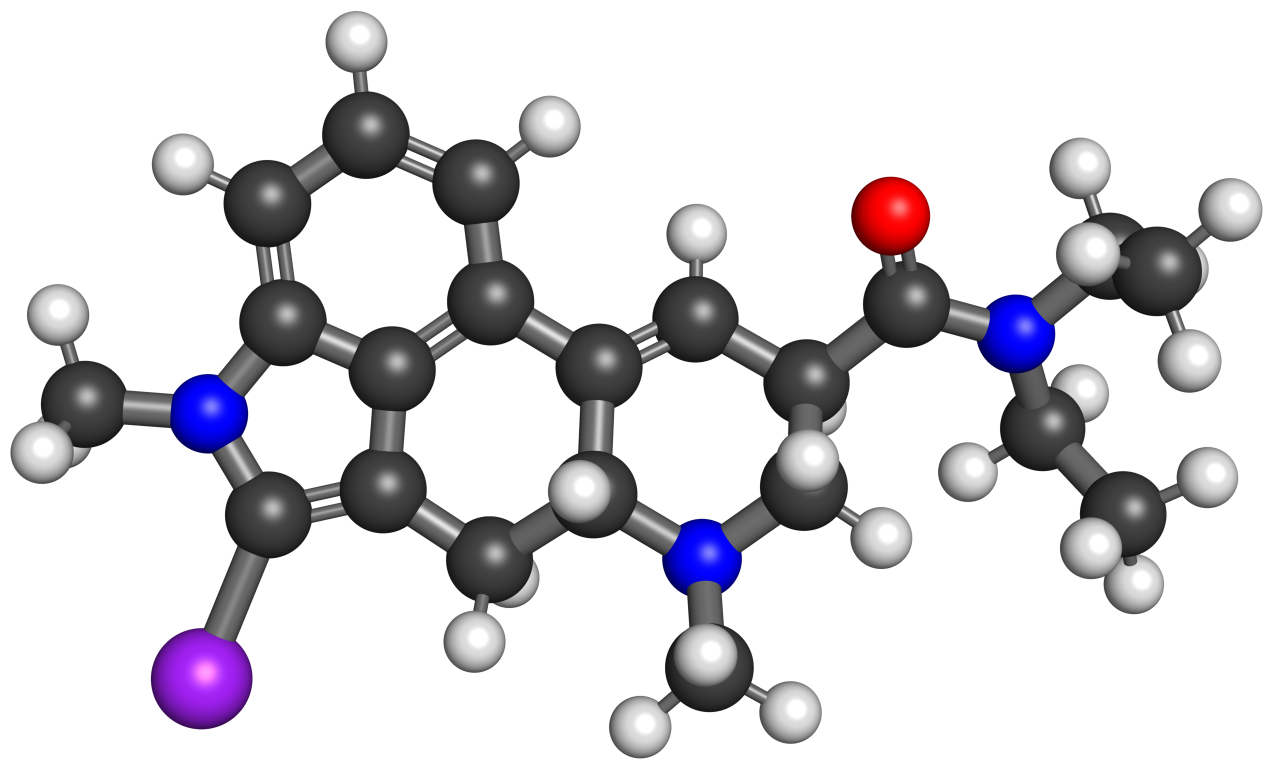

Clinical data
- Other names: MIL; 1-Me-2-I-LSD; 2-Iodo-1-methyl-N,N-diethyllysergamide
- Drug class: Serotonin receptor modulator
- ATC code: None

Identifiers
- IUPAC name: (6aR,9R)-N,N-diethyl-5-iodo-4,7-dimethyl-6,6a,8,9-tetrahydroindolo[4,3-fg]quinoline-9-carboxamide
- CAS Number: 97165-34-9
- PubChem CID: 126269
- ChemSpider: 112233
- CompTox Dashboard (EPA): DTXSID10914083

Chemical and physical data
- Formula: C_{21}H_{26}IN_{3}O
- Molar mass: 463.363 g·mol^{−1}
- 3D model (JSmol): Interactive image
- SMILES: CCN(CC)C(=O)[C@H]1CN([C@@H]2CC3=C(N(C4=CC=CC(=C34)C2=C1)C)I)C
- InChI: InChI=1S/C21H26IN3O/c1-5-25(6-2)21(26)13-10-15-14-8-7-9-17-19(14)16(20(22)24(17)4)11-18(15)23(3)12-13/h7-10,13,18H,5-6,11-12H2,1-4H3/t13-,18-/m1/s1; Key:TWQOQCUIXUGDKO-FZKQIMNGSA-N

1-Methyl-2-iodo-LSD (MIL) is a serotonin receptor modulator of the lysergamide family related to lysergic acid diethylamide (LSD). It is the 1-methyl derivative of 2-iodo-LSD (IOL). Extensive metabolism of other 1-methylated lysergamides to their secondary amine derivatives, for instance methysergide (1-methylmethylergometrine) conversion into methylergometrine, has been observed. The properties and effects of MIL in humans are unknown. However, a radiolabeled form of MIL, 1-methyl-2-[^{125}I]iodo-LSD ([^{125}I]-MIL), as well as the analogue 1-ethyl-2-[^{125}I]iodo-LSD ([^{125}I]-EIL), have been developed for use as presumably non-hallucinogenic agents in imaging of serotonin receptors. [^{125}I]-MIL has much greater selectivity for serotonin 5-HT_{2} receptors over dopamine receptors compared to LSD. MIL and [^{125}I]-MIL were first described in the scientific literature by Beth J. Hoffman and colleagues by 1985.

== See also ==
- Substituted lysergamide
- 2-Iodo-LSD
- MBL-61 (1-methyl-2-bromo-LSD)
- BOL-148 (2-bromo-LSD)
- 1P-BOL-148
- MLD-41 (1-methyl-LSD)
- Methysergide
