= C24H33N3O =

The molecular formula C_{24}H_{33}N_{3}O (molar mass: 379.548 g/mol) may refer to:

- Butodesnitazene
- LBB-66
