= C23H31N3O =

The molecular formula C_{23}H_{31}N_{3}O (molar mass: 365.51 g/mol, exact mass: 365.2467 u) may refer to:

- APINACA, or AKB48
- BU-LAD, or 6-butyl-6-nor-lysergic acid diethylamide
- Etomethazene
- Protodesnitazene
- Isotodesnitazene
