= Lysergamides =

Class of chemical compounds

The lysergamide core, with common substitution positions denoted.

Lysergamides, also known as ergoamides or as lysergic acid amides, are amides of lysergic acid (LA). They are ergolines, with some lysergamides being found naturally in ergot as well as other fungi. Lysergamides are notable in containing embedded phenethylamine and tryptamine moieties within their ergoline ring system.

The simplest lysergamides are ergine (lysergic acid amide; LSA) and isoergine (iso-lysergic acid amide; iso-LSA). In terms of pharmacology, the lysergamides include numerous serotonin and dopamine receptor agonists, most notably the psychedelic drug lysergic acid diethylamide (LSD) but also a number of pharmaceutical drugs like ergometrine, methylergometrine, methysergide, and cabergoline. Various analogues of LSD, such as the psychedelics ALD-52 (1A-LSD), ETH-LAD, LSZ, and 1P-LSD and the non-hallucinogenic 2-bromo-LSD (BOL-148), have also been developed. Ergopeptines like ergotamine, dihydroergotamine, and bromocriptine are also lysergamides, but with addition of a small peptide moiety at the amide. Close analogues of lysergamides that are not technically lysergamides themselves include lisuride, terguride, bromerguride, JRT (isotryptamine-LSD), and LSD-Quinoline, among others.

Lysergamides were first discovered and described in the 1930s. LSD was first synthesized in 1938 and its psychedelic effects were discovered in 1943.

Simplified or partial ergolines and lysergamides, such as NDTDI (8,10-seco-LSD), UCD0120, and N-DEAOP-NMT, are also known.

== Use and effects ==
The doses, potencies, durations, and effects of lysergamides have been reviewed by Alexander Shulgin. They have also been reviewed by Albert Hofmann, David E. Nichols, and other researchers.

Doses, potencies, and durations of LSD and its analogues
Common name	Code	Dose	Potency (×LSD)	Duration
Lysergic acid amide (LSA; ergine)	LA-111	500–6,000 μg	≤10%	~4–10 hours
Isolysergic acid amide (iso-LSA; isoergine)	Iso-LA-819	2,000–5,000 μg	<10%	~4–10 hours
Lysergic acid methylamide	LAM	~500 μg	≤20%	Unknown
Lysergic acid dimethylamide	DAM-57	500–1,200 μg	10%	Unknown
Lysergic acid ethylamide (LAE)	LAE-32	500–1,600 μg	≤10%	Unknown
1-Acetyl-LAE	ALA-10, 1A-LAE	~1,200 μg	≤10%	Unknown
1-Methyl-LAE	MLA-74	~2,000 μg	5%	Unknown
Lysergic acid methylethylamide	LME-54	Unknown	~33%	Unknown
Lysergic acid diethylamide (LSD)	LSD-25, METH-LAD	50–200 μg	100%	8–12 hours
Isolysergic acid diethylamide	Iso-LSD	>4,000 μg	<2%	Unknown
l-Lysergic acid diethylamide	l-LSD	>10,000 μg	<1%	Unknown
l-Isolysergic acid diethylamide	l-Iso-LSD	>500 μg	<5%	Unknown
2,3-Dihydro-LSD	2,3-DH-LSD	~150–400 μg	~15%	~8–12 hours
9,10-Dihydro-LSD	9,10-DH-LSD	>2,500 μg	<2%	Unknown
10-Hydroxy-9,10-dihydro-LSD	Lumi-LSD	Unknown	<1%	Unknown
2-Bromo-LSD	BOL-148	>1,000 μg (≥6,000 μg)	<10% (≤2%)	Unknown
2-Iodo-LSD	IOL	Unknown	Unknown	Unknown
2-Oxo-LSD (2-oxy-LSD)	–	>300 μg	Unknown	Unknown
1-Acetyl-LSD	ALD-52, 1A-LSD	100–200 μg	100%	~8–12 hours
1-Methyl-LSD	MLD-41	200–300 μg	30%	Unknown
1-Hydroxymethyl-LSD	OML-632	Unknown	~70%	Unknown
1-Propionyl-LSD	1P-LSD	100–200 μg	100%	~8–12 hours
1-Methyl-2-bromo-LSD	MBL-61, MOB-61	>10,000 μg	<1%	Unknown
1-Methyl-2-iodo-LSD	MIL	Unknown	Unknown	Unknown
Lysergic acid propylamide	LAP	>500 μg	<20%	Unknown
Lysergic acid methylpropylamide	LMP-55; LAMPA; MPLA	>100 μg	<100%	Unknown
Lysergic acid ethylpropylamide	LEP-57; EPLA	Unknown	~33%	Unknown
Lysergic acid methylisopropylamide	MiPLA	180–300 μg	~33–50%	Unknown
Lysergic acid dipropylamide	DPL	>1,000 μg	<10%	Unknown
Lysergic acid dibutylamide	LBB-66	Unknown	0%	Unknown
Lysergic acid diallylamide	DAL	>1,000 μg	<10%	Unknown
Ergonovine (ergometrine)^{a}	–	5,000–10,000 μg	≤1%	Unknown
Methylergonovine (methylergometrine)^{b}	–	2,000 μg	5%	Unknown
Propisergide^{c}	PML-946	>3,000 μg	Unknown	Unknown
Methysergide^{d}	UML-491	4,000–8,000 μg	2%	Unknown
Lysergic acid piperidide	LA-Pip	Unknown	Unknown	Unknown
Lysergic acid pyrrolidide (LPD)	LPD-824	~800 μg	5–10%	Unknown
Lysergic acid pyrrolinide	LPN	Unknown	Unknown	Unknown
1-Methyl-LPD	MPD-75	>1,600 μg	≤10%	Unknown
Lysergic acid morpholide	LSM-775, SLM	300–600 μg	10–30%	Unknown
Lysergic acid 2,4-dimethylazetidide	LA-SS-Az, LSZ	100–300 μg	50%	~4–10 hours
Nor-LSD (6-nor-LSD)	H-LAD	>500 μg	<20%	Unknown
6-Ethyl-nor-LSD	ETH-LAD	40–150 μg	200%	8–12 hours
6-Propyl-nor-LSD	PRO-LAD	80–200 μg	100%	6–8 hours
6-Allyl-nor-LSD	AL-LAD, ALLY-LAD	50–160 μg	100%	6–8 hours
6-n-Butyl-nor-LSD	BU-LAD	≥400–500 μg	<30%	Unknown
6-Propynyl-nor-LSD	PARGY-LAD	160–500 μg	20–60%	Unknown
6-(β-Phenethyl)-nor-LSD	PHENETH-LAD	>350–500 μg	<30%	Unknown
Footnotes: ^{a} = Ergonovine is lysergic acid hydroxyisopropylamide. ^{b} = Methylergonovine is lysergic acid hydroxy-sec-butylamide. ^{c} = Propisergide is 1-methylergonovine. ^{d} = Methysergide is 1-methylmethylergonovine. Refs: Main: Additional:

The properties of various additional lysergamides, for instance in terms of serotonin antagonism, have also been described.

== Pharmacology ==
=== Pharmacodynamics ===
Serotonin and dopamine receptor affinities (K_{i}, nM) of selected lysergamides and related compounds (Jain et al., 2025)
Compound	5-HT_{1A}	5-HT_{1B}	5-HT_{1D}	5-HT_{1E}	5-HT_{2A}	5-HT_{2B}	5-HT_{2C}	5-HT_{3}	5-HT_{5A}	5-HT_{6}	5-HT_{7}	D_{1}	D_{2}	D_{3}	D_{4}	D_{5}
LSD	5.9	21	3.5	135	8.5	5.5	17	–	1.8	16	8.5	288	204	37	112	955
DAM-57	14	18	17	56	12	16	87	–	42	19	23	676	–	309	955	2,000
DiPLA	58	89	25	457	15	17	234	–	17	49	26	135	234	25	219	316
LAMPA	13	27	6.6	–	11	4.9	58	–	19	35	6.5	339	204	35	32	794
LSZ	2.3	63	18	224	16	3.5	15	–	32	18	35	468	115	9.1	129	1,150
NorLSD	7.8	141	37	407	15	54	525	–	100	14	51	–	–	76	275	–
ETH-LAD	3.5	32	15	85	9.3	18	56	–	21	21	11	417	158	81	240	891
AL-LAD	6.0	275	78	479	17	14	68	–	11	50	42	–	269	27	155	–
MAL-LAD	174	–	295	–	28	54	479	–	89	1,050	200	–	–	363	3,240	–
BU-LAD	21	2,190	129	1,350	21	16	25	–	91	26	123	417	813	91	661	3,630
Lisuride	4.1	63	13	93	25	16	50	–	5.6	18	9.5	174	10	5.6	10	1,050

Serotonin and dopamine receptor affinities (K_{i}, nM) of selected lysergamides and related compounds (Ray, 2010)
Compound	5-HT_{1A}	5-HT_{1B}	5-HT_{1D}	5-HT_{1E}	5-HT_{2A}	5-HT_{2B}	5-HT_{2C}	5-HT_{3}	5-HT_{5A}	5-HT_{6}	5-HT_{7}	D_{1}	D_{2}	D_{3}	D_{4}	D_{5}
LSD	7.3	3.9	7.8	93	11	30	31	>10,000	9	6.9	6.6	177	110	27	158	344
LSZ	0.4	2.4	?	276	19	27	37	>10,000	27	15	14	292	74	6	96	402
Lisuride	0.3	16	>10,000	44	5.4	2.9	>10,000	>10,000	3.1	7.3	6.8	>10,000	6.7	136	3.8	77

== History ==
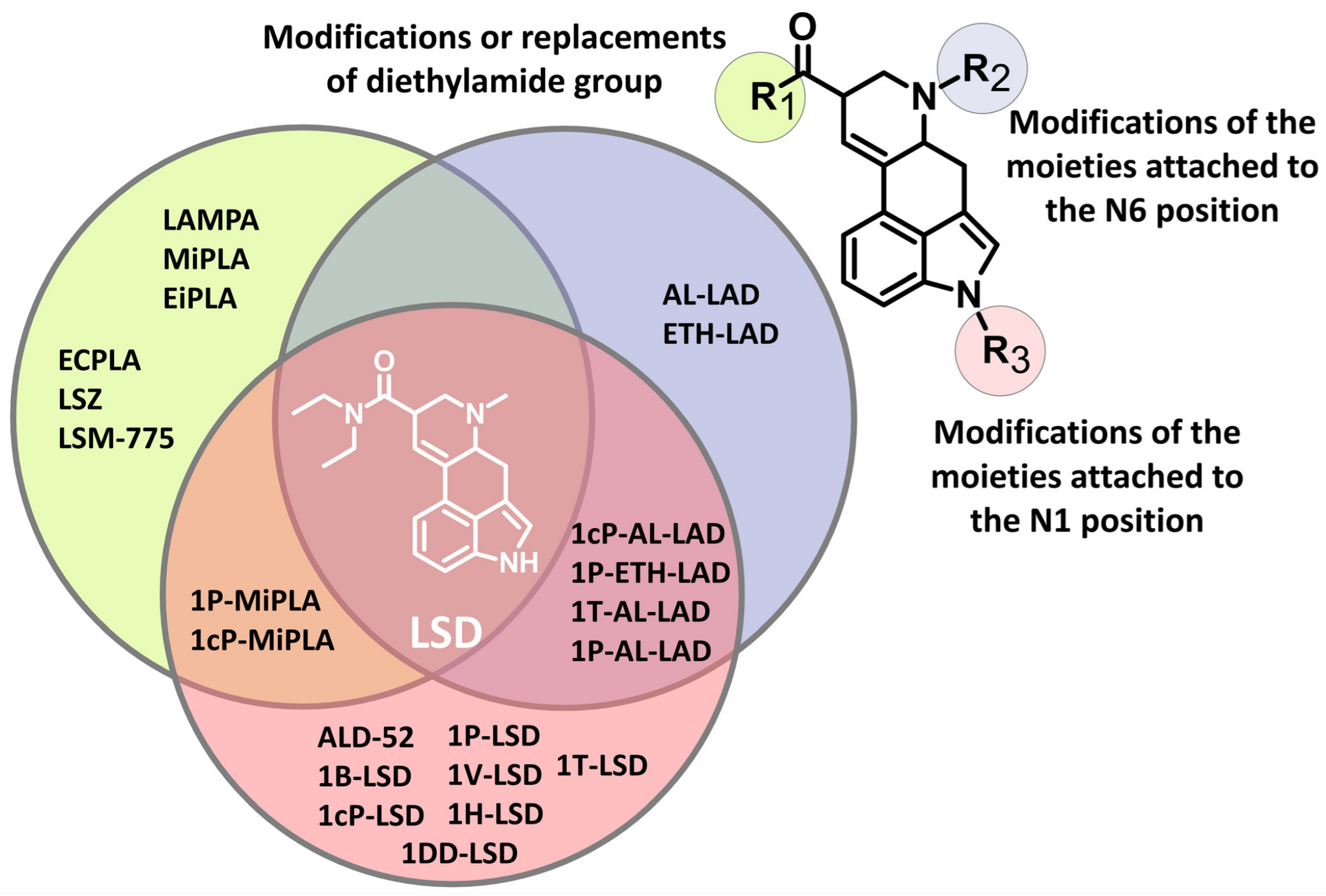
Major types of structural modifications of LSD.

Lysergamides, such as ergine, isoergine, and ergometrine, were discovered by the early 1930s, and LSD was discovered by 1938 and its hallucinogenic effects in 1943 by Albert Hofmann. Many synthetic lysergamide analogues of LSD, modified at the amide and/or 1 or 2 positions, were first described by Hofmann and colleagues in the mid-to-late 1950s. N(6)-Substituted lysergamides were first reported in 1970 and thereafter in the 1970s and 1980s by multiple groups, including Hofmann and colleagues, Yuji Nakahara and Tetsukichi Niwaguchi and colleagues, and David E. Nichols and colleagues. The psychedelic effects of N(6)-substituted lysergamides were reported by Alexander Shulgin in 1986 and thereafter. Additional novel lysergamides modified at the amide, like LA-3Cl-SB and LA-Aziridine, were described by Nichols and Robert Oberlender and colleagues in the late 1980s, while LSZ (LA-Azetidine) was described by the same group in 2002. Numerous 1-substituted LSD prodrugs such as 1P-LSD and 1V-LSD and other psychedelic lysergamides were developed by Lizard Labs in the 2010s and 2020s.

== List of lysergamides ==
Lysergamides, tabulated by structure
Structure	Name (synonyms)	CAS #	R1	R6	R2	R3	Other
	Ergine (lysergic acid amide; LSA; LA-111; lysergamide)	478-94-4	H	CH_{3}	H	H	-
	Isoergine (isolysergic acid amide; iso-LSA; iso-LA-819; isolysergamide)	2889-26-1	H	CH_{3}	H	H	8-epi
	LAM (lysergic acid methylamide)	50485-06-8	H	CH_{3}	CH_{3}	H	-
	DAM-57 (lysergic acid dimethylamide)	4238-84-0	H	CH_{3}	CH_{3}	CH_{3}	-
	LSH (LAH; lysergic acid hydroxyethylamide)	3343-15-5	H	CH_{3}	CH_{3}CHOH	H	-
	Ergometrine (ergonovine; lysergic acid propanolamide)	60-79-7	H	CH_{3}	CH(CH_{3})CH_{2}OH	H	-
	Propisergide (1-methylergonovine; PML-946)	5793-04-4	CH_{3}	CH_{3}	CH(CH_{3})CH_{2}OH	H	-
	Methylergometrine (methylergonovine; lysergic acid butanolamide)	113-42-8	H	CH_{3}	CH(CH_{2}CH_{3})CH_{2}OH	H	-
	Methysergide (1-methyl-lysergic acid butanolamide; UML-491)	361-37-5	CH_{3}	CH_{3}	CH(CH_{2}CH_{3})CH_{2}OH	H	-
	Lysergyl-alanine (lysergylalanine)	?	H	CH_{3}	?	H	-
	Ergovalide (lysergylvaline amide)	41645-63-0	H	CH_{3}	?	H	-
	Lysergyl-L-valyl methyl ester	?	H	CH_{3}	?	H	-
	Amesergide (LY-237733; 9,10-dihydro-11-isopropyllysergic acid cyclohexylamide)	121588-75-8	CH(CH_{3})_{2}	CH_{3}	C_{6}H_{11}	H	-
	LY-215840 (1-isopropyl-9,10-dihydro-N-(2-hydroxycyclopent-anyl)lysergamide)	137328-52-0	CH(CH_{3})_{2}	CH_{3}	C_{5}H_{8}OH	H	-
	Cabergoline (N-[3-(dimethylamino)propyl]-N-(ethylcarbamoyl)-6-(prop-2-en-1-yl)-9,10-dihydrolysergamide)	81409-90-7	H	H_{2}C=CH-CH_{2}	CONHCH_{2}CH_{3}	CH_{2}CH_{2}CH_{2}N(CH_{3})_{2}	-
	LAE-32 (lysergic acid ethylamide)	478-99-9	H	CH_{3}	CH_{2}CH_{3}	H	-
	LAP (lysergic acid propylamide)	?	H	CH_{3}	CH_{2}CH_{2}CH_{3}	H	-
	iPLA (lysergic acid isopropylamide; LAiP)		H	CH_{3}	CH(CH_{3})_{2}	H	-
	LAtB (lysergic acid tert-butylamide)		H	CH_{3}	C(CH_{3})_{3}	H	-
	Lysergic acid butylamide	50583-88-5	H	CH_{3}	CH_{2}CH_{2}CH_{2}CH_{3}	H	-
	Lysergic acid amylamide (lysergic acid pentylamide)	?	H	CH_{3}	CH_{2}CH_{2}CH_{2}CH_{2}CH_{3}	H	-
	LEK-8804 (N-(2-propynyl)lysergamide)	153415-44-2	H	CH_{3}	CH_{2}C≡CH	H	-
	LEK-8842 (N-methyl-N-(2-propynyl)lysergamide; TRALA-01)		H	CH_{3}	CH_{2}C≡CH	CH_{3}	-
	LAcB (lysergic acid cyclobutylamide)		H	CH_{3}	(CH_{2})_{4}	H	-
	Cepentil (lysergic acid cyclopentylamide)		H	CH_{3}	(CH_{2})_{5}	H	-
	LSB (lysergic acid 2-butylamide)	137765-82-3	H	CH_{3}	CH(CH_{3})CH_{2}CH_{3}	H	-
	LSP (3-LSP; lysergic acid 3-pentylamide)	162105-96-6	H	CH_{3}	CH(CH_{2}CH_{3})CH_{2}CH_{3}	H	-
	2-LSP (lysergic acid 2-pentylamide)	?	H	CH_{3}	CH(CH_{3})C_{3}H_{7}	H	-
	Lysergic acid 2-hexylamide (N2He-LA, 2-LSHe)	?	H	CH_{3}	CH(CH_{3})C_{4}H_{9}	H	-
	Lysergic acid 2-heptylamide (N2Hp-LA, 2-LSHp)	?	H	CH_{3}	CH(CH_{3})C_{5}H_{11}	H	-
	Lysergic acid α-methylbenzylamide (N-(α-methylbenzyl)lysergamide)	?	H	CH_{3}	CH(CH_{3})C_{6}H_{5}	H	-
	Lysergic acid methyl-2-butylamide	?	H	CH_{3}	CH(CH_{3})CH_{2}CH_{3}	CH_{3}	-
	Lysergic acid ethyl-2-butylamide	?	H	CH_{3}	CH(CH_{3})CH_{2}CH_{3}	CH_{2}CH_{3}	-
	DPL (lysergic acid dipropylamide)		H	CH_{3}	CH_{2}CH_{2}CH_{3}	CH_{2}CH_{2}CH_{3}	-
	DiPLA (lysergic acid diisopropylamide)		H	CH_{3}	CH(CH_{3})_{2}	CH(CH_{3})_{2}	-
	LBB-66 (lysergic acid dibutylamide)		H	CH_{3}	CH_{2}CH_{2}CH_{2}CH_{3}	CH_{2}CH_{2}CH_{2}CH_{3}	-
	DAL (lysergic acid diallylamide)	73032-97-0	H	CH_{3}	H_{2}C=CH-CH_{2}	H_{2}C=CH-CH_{2}	-
	MiPLA (lysergic acid methylisopropylamide)	100768-08-9	H	CH_{3}	CH(CH_{3})_{2}	CH_{3}	-
	EiPLA (lysergic acid ethylisopropylamide)	154504-04-8	H	CH_{3}	CH(CH_{3})_{2}	CH_{2}CH_{3}	-
	EcPLA (lysergic acid ethylcyclopropylamide)	2349367-50-4	H	CH_{3}	C_{3}H_{5}	CH_{2}CH_{3}	-
	LEO (lysergic acid ethyl-2-hydroxyethylamide)	65527-58-4	H	CH_{3}	CH_{2}CH_{2}OH	CH_{2}CH_{3}	-
	LA-MeO (lysergic acid ethyl-2-methoxyethylamide)		H	CH_{3}	CH_{2}CH_{2}OCH_{3}	CH_{2}CH_{3}	-
	ETFELA (TRALA-06; lysergic acid N-ethyl-N-(2,2,2-trifluoroethyl)amide)	3024529-99-2	H	CH_{3}	CH_{2}CF_{3}	CH_{2}CH_{3}	-
	EFELA (TRALA-04; WO 2022/008627 Compound 4)		H	CH_{3}	CH_{2}CH_{2}F	CH_{2}CH_{3}	-
	DFELA (TRALA-08; WO 2022/226408 Example 29)		H	CH_{3}	CH_{2}CH_{2}F	CH_{2}CH_{2}F	-
	LA-3Cl-SB (lysergic acid N-(3-chloro-sec-butyl)amide)		H	CH_{3}	CH(CH_{3})CClHCH_{3}	H	-
	LME-54 (lysergic acid methylethylamide)		H	CH_{3}	CH_{2}CH_{3}	CH_{3}	-
	LAMPA (LMP-55; lysergic acid methylpropylamide)	40158-98-3	H	CH_{3}	CH_{2}CH_{2}CH_{3}	CH_{3}	-
	TRALA-12 (lysergic acid vinylethylamide; likely didehydro-LSD or DDH-LSD)	65527-59-5	H	CH_{3}	CHCH_{2}	CH_{2}CH_{3}	-
	EPLA (lysergic acid ethylpropylamide; LEP-57)		H	CH_{2}CH_{3}	CH_{2}CH_{2}CH_{3}	CH_{3}	-
	LSD (lysergic acid diethylamide; LAD)	50-37-3	H	CH_{3}	CH_{2}CH_{3}	CH_{2}CH_{3}	-
	Iso-LSD	2126-78-5	H	CH_{3}	CH_{2}CH_{3}	CH_{2}CH_{3}	8-epi
	l-LSD	3184-49-4	H	CH_{3}	CH_{2}CH_{3}	CH_{2}CH_{3}	5,8-epi
	l-Iso-LSD		H	CH_{3}	CH_{2}CH_{3}	CH_{2}CH_{3}	5-epi
	Nor-LSD (6-nor-LSD)	35779-43-2	H	H	CH_{2}CH_{3}	CH_{2}CH_{3}	-
	ETH-LAD (6-ethyl-6-nor-LSD)	65527-62-0	H	CH_{2}CH_{3}	CH_{2}CH_{3}	CH_{2}CH_{3}	-
	PARGY-LAD (6-propynyl-6-nor-LSD)	2767597-51-1	H	HC≡C−CH_{2}	CH_{2}CH_{3}	CH_{2}CH_{3}	-
	AL-LAD (6-allyl-6-nor-LSD)	65527-61-9	H	H_{2}C=CH-CH_{2}	CH_{2}CH_{3}	CH_{2}CH_{3}	-
	PRO-LAD (6-propyl-6-nor-LSD)	65527-63-1	H	CH_{2}CH_{2}CH_{3}	CH_{2}CH_{3}	CH_{2}CH_{3}	-
	IP-LAD (6-isopropyl-6-nor-LSD)	96930-86-8	H	CH(CH_{3})_{2}	CH_{2}CH_{3}	CH_{2}CH_{3}	-
	MAL-LAD (METAL-LAD; 6-methallyl-6-nor-LSD)		H	CH_{2}=C(CH_{3})CH_{2}	CH_{2}CH_{3}	CH_{2}CH_{3}	-
	CYP-LAD (TRALA-22; 6-cyclopropyl-6-nor-LSD)	3024530-20-6	H	C_{3}H_{5}	CH_{2}CH_{3}	CH_{2}CH_{3}	-
	CPM-LAD (6-cyclopropylmethyl-6-nor-LSD)		H	CH_{2}C_{3}H_{5}	CH_{2}CH_{3}	CH_{2}CH_{3}	-
	BU-LAD (6-butyl-6-nor-LSD)	96930-87-9	H	CH_{2}CH_{2}CH_{2}CH_{3}	CH_{2}CH_{3}	CH_{2}CH_{3}	-
	PHENETH-LAD (6-(phenethyl)-6-nor-LSD)		H	CH_{2}CH_{2}C_{6}H_{5}	CH_{2}CH_{3}	CH_{2}CH_{3}	-
	(2-MEO-PHENETH)-LAD (6-(2-methoxyphenethyl)-6-nor-LSD)		H	?	CH_{2}CH_{3}	CH_{2}CH_{3}	-
	NIBR2130 (6-(phenylcarbamoyl)-6-nor-LSD)		H	?	CH_{2}CH_{3}	CH_{2}CH_{3}	-
	NBOMe-LAD (6-(2-methoxybenzyl)-LAD)		H	CH_{2}C_{6}H_{4}-o-OCH_{3}	CH_{2}CH_{3}	CH_{2}CH_{3}	-
	FLUORETH-LAD (FE-LAD; TRALA-15; 6-(2-fluoroethyl)-6-nor-LSD)	2757566-18-8	H	CH_{2}CH_{2}F	CH_{2}CH_{3}	CH_{2}CH_{3}	-
	FP-LAD (PROF-LAD; TRALA-16; WO 2022/226408 Example 2; 6-(3-fluoropropyl)-6-nor-LSD)		H	CH_{2}CH_{2}CH_{2}F	CH_{2}CH_{3}	CH_{2}CH_{3}	-
	CE-LAD (CHLORETH-LAD; 6-(2-chloroethyl)-6-nor-LSD)		H	CH_{2}CH_{2}Cl	CH_{2}CH_{3}	CH_{2}CH_{3}	-
	LEK-8827 (6-methyl-LEK-8842; 6-methyl-N-methyl-N-(2-propynyl)lysergamide)		H	(CH_{3})_{2}	CH_{2}C≡CH	CH_{3}	-
	1-Formyl-LSD (1F-LSD)		CH=O	CH_{3}	CH_{2}CH_{3}	CH_{2}CH_{3}	-
	ALD-52 (1-acetyl-LSD; 1A-LSD)	3270-02-8	COCH_{3}	CH_{3}	CH_{2}CH_{3}	CH_{2}CH_{3}	-
	ALA-10 (1-acetyl-LAE; 1A-LAE)	50485-03-5	COCH_{3}	CH_{3}	CH_{2}CH_{3}	H	-
	1P-LSD (1-propionyl-LSD)	2349358-81-0	COCH_{2}CH_{3}	CH_{3}	CH_{2}CH_{3}	CH_{2}CH_{3}	-
	1B-LSD (1-butanoyl-LSD)	2349376-12-9	COCH_{2}CH_{2}CH_{3}	CH_{3}	CH_{2}CH_{3}	CH_{2}CH_{3}	-
	1V-LSD (1-valeryl-LSD)	3028950-70-8	CO(CH_{2})_{3}CH_{3}	CH_{3}	CH_{2}CH_{3}	CH_{2}CH_{3}	-
	1H-LSD (1-hexanoyl-LSD)	3028949-65-4	CO(CH_{2})_{4}CH_{3}	CH_{3}	CH_{2}CH_{3}	CH_{2}CH_{3}	-
	1DD-LSD (1-dodecanoyl-LSD)	3028949-80-3	CO(CH_{2})_{10}CH_{3}	CH_{3}	CH_{2}CH_{3}	CH_{2}CH_{3}	-
	1cP-LSD (1-cyclopropylmethanoyl-LSD)	2767597-50-0	COC_{3}H_{5}	CH_{3}	CH_{2}CH_{3}	CH_{2}CH_{3}	-
	1D-LSD (1-(1,2-dimethylcyclobutane-1-carbonyl)-LSD)		COC_{4}H_{5}(CH_{3})_{2}	CH_{3}	CH_{2}CH_{3}	CH_{2}CH_{3}	-
	1F-LSD (1-(furan-2-carbonyl)-LSD; 1-(2-furoyl)-LSD; SYN-L-005)		COC_{4}H_{3}O	CH_{3}	CH_{2}CH_{3}	CH_{2}CH_{3}	-
	1T-LSD (1-(thiophene-2-carbonyl)-LSD)	3028949-85-8	COC_{4}H_{3}S	CH_{3}	CH_{2}CH_{3}	CH_{2}CH_{3}	-
	1Bz-LSD (1-benzoyl-LSD; SYN-L-018)		COC_{6}H_{5}	CH_{3}	CH_{2}CH_{3}	CH_{2}CH_{3}	-
	1N-LSD (1-(pyridin-3-ylcarbonyl)-LSD)		COC_{5}H_{4}N	CH_{3}	CH_{2}CH_{3}	CH_{2}CH_{3}	-
	1C-LSD (1CPP-LSD; 1-(cypionyl)-LSD)		CO(CH_{2})_{2}C_{5}H_{8}	CH_{3}	CH_{2}CH_{3}	CH_{2}CH_{3}	-
	1PP-LSD (1-(phenylpropionyl)-LSD)		CO(CH_{2})_{2}C_{6}H_{5}	CH_{3}	CH_{2}CH_{3}	CH_{2}CH_{3}	-
	1MS-LSD (1-(methylsuccinyl)-LSD)		CO(CH_{2})_{2}COOCH_{3}	CH_{3}	CH_{2}CH_{3}	CH_{2}CH_{3}	-
	1OX-LSD (1-(oxetan-3-yl)-LSD)		COCH(CH_{2})_{2}O	CH_{3}	CH_{2}CH_{3}	CH_{2}CH_{3}	-
	1E-LSD (1-(enacarbil)-LSD)		COOCH(CH_{3}); OCOCH(CH_{3})_{2}	CH_{3}	CH_{2}CH_{3}	CH_{2}CH_{3}	-
	1S-LSD (1-(3-(trimethylsilyl)propionyl)-LSD)		CO(CH_{2})_{2}Si(CH_{3})_{3}	CH_{3}	CH_{2}CH_{3}	CH_{2}CH_{3}	-
	1SB-LSD (1BS-LSD; 1-TMSBz-LSD; 1-(4-(trimethylsilyl)benzoyl)-LSD)		CO(C_{6}H_{4})-p-Si(CH_{3})_{3}	CH_{3}	CH_{2}CH_{3}	CH_{2}CH_{3}	-
	1DP-LSD (1-(3-(dimethylphosphoryl)propionyl)-LSD)		CO(CH_{2})_{2}PO(CH_{3})_{2}	CH_{3}	CH_{2}CH_{3}	CH_{2}CH_{3}	-
	1BP-LSD (1-(3-(tetramethyldioxaborolane)propionyl)-LSD)		CO(CH_{2})_{2}BO_{2} (C(CH_{3})_{2})_{2}	CH_{3}	CH_{2}CH_{3}	CH_{2}CH_{3}	-
	1Fe-LSD (1-(ferrocenecarbonyl)-LSD)	3029080-72-3	CO(C_{5}H_{4})FeC_{5}H_{5}	CH_{3}	CH_{2}CH_{3}	CH_{2}CH_{3}	-
	1P-AL-LAD (1-propionyl-6-allyl-6-nor-LSD)	3028950-71-9	COCH_{2}CH_{3}	H_{2}C=CH-CH_{2}	CH_{2}CH_{3}	CH_{2}CH_{3}	-
	1cP-AL-LAD (1-cyclopropylmethanoyl-6-allyl-6-nor-LSD)		COC_{3}H_{5}	H_{2}C=CH-CH_{2}	CH_{2}CH_{3}	CH_{2}CH_{3}	-
	1D-AL-LAD (1-(1,2-dimethylcyclobutane-1-carbonyl)-AL-LAD)		COC_{4}H_{5}(CH_{3})_{2}	H_{2}C=CH-CH_{2}	CH_{2}CH_{3}	CH_{2}CH_{3}	-
	1T-AL-LAD (1-(2-thienoyl)-6-allyl-6-nor-LSD)		COC_{4}H_{3}S	H_{2}C=CH-CH_{2}	CH_{2}CH_{3}	CH_{2}CH_{3}	-
	1P-ETH-LAD (1-propionyl-6-ethyl-6-nor-LSD)	2230715-45-2	COCH_{2}CH_{3}	CH_{2}CH_{3}	CH_{2}CH_{3}	CH_{2}CH_{3}	-
	1P-MiPLA (1-propionyl-lysergic acid methylisopropylamide)		COCH_{2}CH_{3}	CH_{3}	CH(CH_{3})_{2}	CH_{3}	-
	1cP-MiPLA (1-cyclopropionyl-lysergic acid methylisopropylamide)	3028950-74-2	COC_{3}H_{5}	CH_{3}	CH(CH_{3})_{2}	CH_{3}	-
	MLD-41 (1-methyl-LSD)	4238-85-1	CH_{3}	CH_{3}	CH_{2}CH_{3}	CH_{2}CH_{3}	-
	MLA-74 (1-methyl-LAE)	7240-57-5	CH_{3}	CH_{3}	CH_{2}CH_{3}	H	-
	OML-632 (1-hydroxymethyl-LSD)	114004-70-5	CH_{2}OH	CH_{3}	CH_{2}CH_{3}	CH_{2}CH_{3}	-
	1-Dimethylaminomethyl-LSD	?	CH_{2}NCH_{2}CH_{2}	CH_{3}	CH_{2}CH_{3}	CH_{2}CH_{3}	-
	Lysergic acid-(2,3-dimethylaziridinyl)amide (LA-Aziridine)	?	H	CH_{3}	?		-
	Lysergic acid 2,4-dimethylazetidide (LA-SS-Az, LSZ, LA-Azetidine)	470666-31-0	H	CH_{3}	CH_{2}(CHCH_{3})_{2}CH_{2}		-
	LPD-824 (lysergic acid pyrrolidide)	2385-87-7	H	CH_{3}	(CH_{2})_{4}		-
	MPD-75 (1-methyllysergic acid pyrrolidide)	7221-79-6	CH_{3}	CH_{3}	(CH_{2})_{4}		-
	Lysergic acid pyrrolinide	?	H	CH_{3}	CH_{2}-CH=CH-CH_{2}		-
	LA-Cispyr (LA-cis-2,5-DiMePyr)	?	H	CH_{3}	cis-CH(CH_{3})-CH_{2}CH_{2}-CH(CH_{3})		-
	LA-Pip (lysergic acid piperidide)	50485-23-9	H	CH_{3}	(CH_{2})_{5}		-
	LA-cis-2,6-DiMePip (lysergic acid cis-2,6-dimethylpiperidide)	?	H	CH_{3}	?		-
	LSM-775 (lysergic acid morpholide)	4314-63-0	H	CH_{3}	CH_{2}CH_{2}-O-CH_{2}CH_{2}		-
	LA-Azepane (lysergic acid azepane)		H	CH_{3}	(CH_{2})_{6}		-
	2-Oxa-6-azaspiro[3.3]heptyl-lysergamide (WO 2022/008627 compound)		H	CH_{3}	(CH_{2})_{2}C(CH_{2})_{2}O		-
	2-Bromo-LSD (BOL-148; bromolysergide)	478-84-2	H	CH_{3}	CH_{2}CH_{3}	CH_{2}CH_{3}	2-Br
	2-Iodo-LSD (IOL)	3712-25-2	H	CH_{3}	CH_{2}CH_{3}	CH_{2}CH_{3}	2-I
	2-Oxo-LSD (2-oxy-LSD)	?	H	CH_{3}	CH_{2}CH_{3}	CH_{2}CH_{3}	2-Oxo
	2-Oxo-3-hydroxy-LSD	111295-09-1	H	CH_{3}	CH_{2}CH_{3}	CH_{2}CH_{3}	2-Oxo, 3-OH
	MBL-61 (MOB-61; 1-methyl-2-bromo-LSD)	50484-98-5	CH_{3}	CH_{3}	CH_{2}CH_{3}	CH_{2}CH_{3}	2-Br
	MIL (1-methyl-2-iodo-LSD)	97165-34-9	CH_{3}	CH_{3}	CH_{2}CH_{3}	CH_{2}CH_{3}	2-I
	LEK-8841 (2-bromo-LEK-8842; 2-bromo-N-methyl-N-(2-propynyl)lysergamide)		H	CH_{3}	CH_{2}C≡CH	CH_{3}	2-Br
	1P-BOL-148 (1-propionyl-2-bromo-LSD)		COCH_{2}CH_{3}	CH_{3}	CH_{2}CH_{3}	CH_{2}CH_{3}	2-Br
	12-Hydroxy-LSD (12-OH-LSD)	60573-89-9	H	CH_{3}	CH_{2}CH_{3}	CH_{2}CH_{3}	12-OH
	12-Methoxy-LSD (12-MeO-LSD)	50484-99-6	H	CH_{3}	CH_{2}CH_{3}	CH_{2}CH_{3}	12-OMe
	13-Fluoro-LSD		H	CH_{3}	CH_{2}CH_{3}	CH_{2}CH_{3}	13-F
	13-Hydroxy-LSD		H	CH_{3}	CH_{2}CH_{3}	CH_{2}CH_{3}	13-OH
	13-Methoxy-LSD		H	CH_{3}	CH_{2}CH_{3}	CH_{2}CH_{3}	13-OMe
	14-Hydroxy-LSD		H	CH_{3}	CH_{2}CH_{3}	CH_{2}CH_{3}	14-OH
	14-Methoxy-LSD		H	CH_{3}	CH_{2}CH_{3}	CH_{2}CH_{3}	14-OMe
	14-Methyl-LSD	3069948-26-8	H	CH_{3}	CH_{2}CH_{3}	CH_{2}CH_{3}	14-Me
	2-Br-14-Me-LSD		H	CH_{3}	CH_{2}CH_{3}	CH_{2}CH_{3}	2-Br, 14-Me

== Related compounds ==
Structure	Name	Chemical name	CAS #
	2,3-Dihydro-LSD (2,3-DH-LSD)	N,N-diethyl-6-methyl-9,10-didehydro-2,3-dihydroergoline-8β-carboxamide	None
	9,10-Dihydro-LSD (9,10-DH-LSD)	(10ξ)-N,N-diethyl-6-methylergoline-8β-carboxamide	3031-47-8
	AWD 52-39 (AWD-5239)	N,N-diacetoxyethyl-9,10-dihydrolysergamide	109002-91-7
	Bromerguride (2-bromolisuride)	1,1-diethyl-3-(2-bromo-9,10-didehydro-6-methyl-8α-ergolinyl)urea	83455-48-5
	Bromocriptine	(5′α)-2-bromo-12′-hydroxy-5′-(2-methylpropyl)-3′,6′,18-trioxo-2′-(propan-2-yl)ergotaman	25614-03-3
	D13H (2-cyclopropyl-9,10-dihydromethysergide; possibly XC101-D13H)	(6aR,9R,10aR)-5-cyclopropyl-N-((S)-1-hydroxybutan-2-yl)-4,7-dimethyl-4,6,6a,7,8,9,10,10a-octahydroindolo[4,3-fg]quinoline-9-carboxamide	?
	Descarboxylysergic acid (DCLA)	6-methyl-9,10-didehydroergoline	51867-17-5
	Dihydroergotamine (DHE-45)	(5'α)-9,10-dihydro-12'-hydroxy-2'-methyl-5'-(phenylmethyl)-ergotaman-3',6',18-trione	511-12-6
	Disulergine	N,N-dimethyl-N'-(6-methylergoline-8α-yl)sulfamide	59032-40-5
	Dosergoside	N-((1S,2R,3E)-2-hydroxy-1-(hydroxymethyl)-3-heptadecenyl)-6-methylergoline-8β-carboxamide	87178-42-5
	Ergoline	(6aR)-4,6,6a,7,8,9,10,10a-octahydroindolo[4,3-fg]quinoline	478-88-6
	Ergotamine	5′α-benzyl-12′-hydroxy-2′-methyl-3′,6′,18-trioxoergotaman	113-15-5
	Etisulergine	N,N-diethyl-N'-(6-methylergolin-8α-yl)sulfamide	64795-23-9
	GYKI-32887 (RGH-7825)	8-((N-2-azidoethyl-N-methylsulfonylamino)methyl)-6-methylergol-8-ene	78463-86-2
	JRT (isotryptamine-LSD)	(7S)-N,N-diethyl-6-methyl-6,9-diazatetracyclo[7.6.1.0^{2,7}.0^{12,16}]hexadeca-1(15),2,10,12(16),13-pentaene-4-carboxamide	?
	"Compound 3A" (isotryptamine-lysergol)	[(4R,7S)-6-methyl-6,9-diazatetracyclo[7.6.1.0^{2,7}.0^{12,16}]hexadeca-1(15),2,10,12(16),13-pentaen-4-yl]methanol	3081797-69-2
	LEK-8822 (9,10-dihydro-LEK-8842)	N-methyl-N-(2-propynyl)-6-methylergoline-8β-carboxamide	?
	LEK-8829 (desoxy-LEK-8842)	9,10-didehydro-N-methyl-N-(2-propynyl)-6-methyl-8β-(aminomethyl)ergoline	145204-78-0
	LSD-Quinoline	(7aR,10R)-N,N-diethyl-8-methyl-7a,8,9,10-tetrahydro-7H-quinolino[7,6,5-de]quinoline-10-carboxamide	?
	Lumi-LSD (10-hydroxy-9,10-dihydro-LSD)	N,N-diethyl-10-hydroxy-6-methylergoline-8β-carboxamide	?
	Lysergine	9,10-didehydro-6,8β-dimethylergoline	519-10-8
	Lysergol	(6-methyl-9,10-didehydroergolin-8β-yl)methanol	1413-67-8
	Lysergic acid (LA)	6-methyl-9,10-didehydroergoline-8β-carboxylic acid	82-58-6
	Lergotrile	2-chloro-6-methylergoline-8β-acetonitrile	36945-03-6
	Lisuride	1,1-diethyl-3-(6-methyl-9,10-didehydroergolin-8α-yl)urea	18016-80-3
	NDTDI (9-desmethine-LSD; 9-nor-LSD; 8,10-seco-LSD)	N,N-diethyl-3-(methyl(1,3,4,5-tetrahydrobenzo[cd]indol-4-yl)amino)propanamide	?
	Paspalic acid (δ^{8}-lysergic acid)	8,9-Didehydro-6-methylergoline-8-carboxylic acid	5516-88-1
	Proterguride (6-propyl-9,10-dihydrolisuride)	1,1-diethyl-3-(6-propyl-8α-ergolinyl)urea	77650-95-4
	Romergoline (FCE-23884)	4-(9,10-didehydro-6-methylergolin-8β-yl)methylpiperazine-2,6-dione	107052-56-2
	RU-29717 (N-propyl-9-oxaergoline)	N-propyl-9-oxaergoline	85351-27-5
	Terguride (9,10-dihydrolisuride)	N,N-diethyl-N'-(6-methylergolin-8α-yl)urea	37686-84-3
	N-(1,3-Thiazol-2-yl)-9,10-dihydrolysergamide	N-(1,3-Thiazol-2-yl)-6-methylergoline-8β-carboxamide	?

== See also ==
- Substituted ergoline
- Partial lysergamide
- Substituted tryptamine
- Substituted phenethylamine
- Lizard Labs
