= PARGY-LAD =

Chemical compound

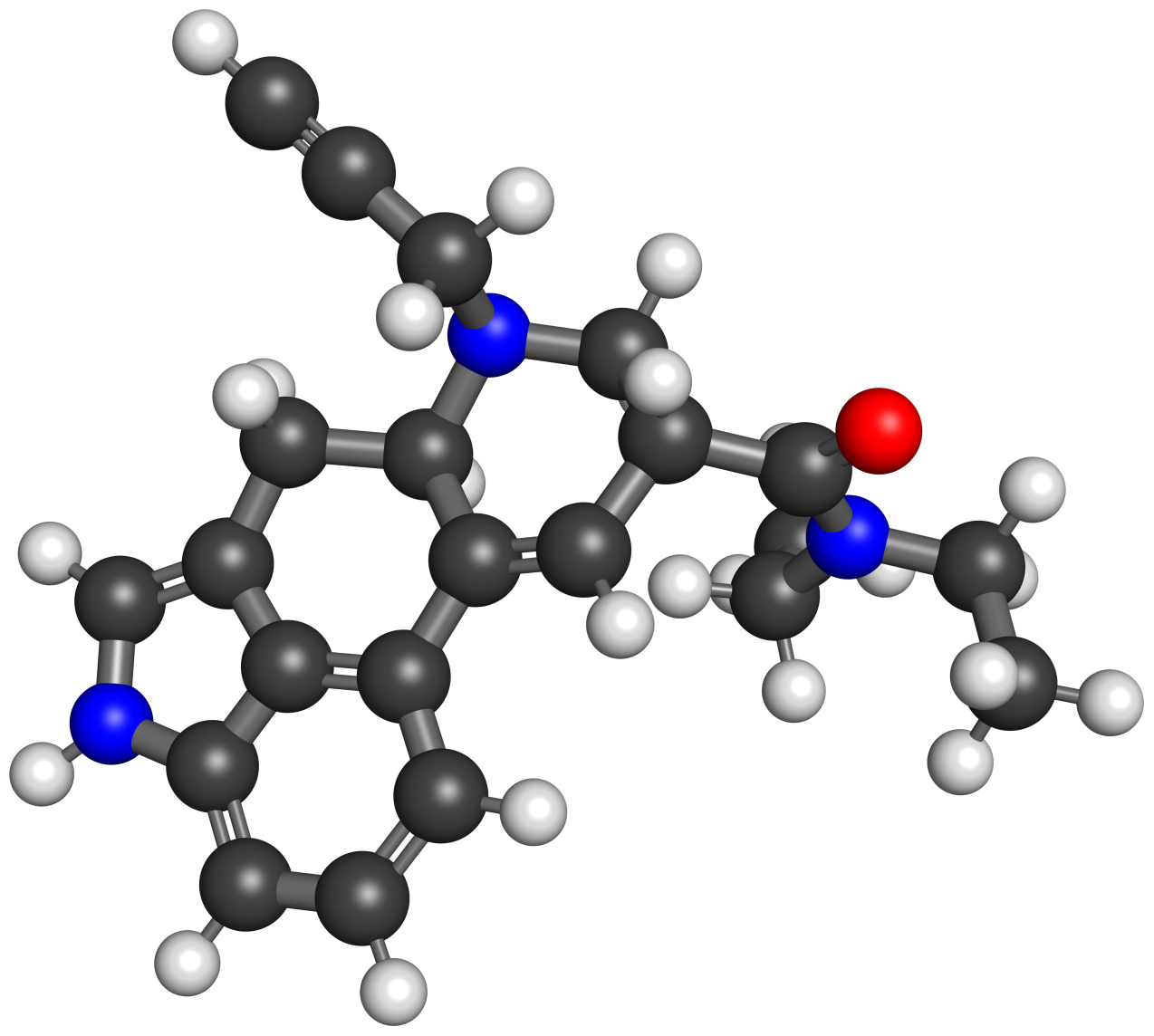

Clinical data
- Other names: PARGYLAD; PROPARGYL-LAD; PROPARGYLLAD; 6-Propynyl-6-nor-LSD; N,N-Diethyl-6-propargyl-6-norlysergamide; N,N-Diethyl-6-(prop-2-yn-1-yl)-9,10-didehydroergoline-8β-carboxamide
- Routes of administration: Oral
- Drug class: Serotonin receptor modulator; Serotonergic psychedelic; Hallucinogen

Legal status
- Legal status: DE: NpSG (Industrial and scientific use only); UK: Under Psychoactive Substances Act; Illegal in France

Identifiers
- IUPAC name: (6aR,9R)-N,N-diethyl-7-prop-2-ynyl-6,6a,8,9-tetrahydro-4H-indolo[4,3-fg]quinoline-9-carboxamide
- CAS Number: 2767597-51-1
- PubChem CID: 139030999
- ChemSpider: 21106360
- CompTox Dashboard (EPA): DTXSID501045856

Chemical and physical data
- Formula: C_{22}H_{25}N_{3}O
- Molar mass: 347.462 g·mol^{−1}
- 3D model (JSmol): Interactive image
- SMILES: CCN(CC)C(=O)[C@@H]2C=C1c3cccc4[nH]cc(C[C@H]1N(C2)CC#C)c34
- InChI: InChI=1S/C22H25N3O/c1-4-10-25-14-16(22(26)24(5-2)6-3)11-18-17-8-7-9-19-21(17)15(13-23-19)12-20(18)25/h1,7-9,11,13,16,20,23H,5-6,10,12,14H2,2-3H3/t16-,20-/m1/s1; Key:BPJKJUFQSNRQCR-OXQOHEQNSA-N

PARGY-LAD, also known as 6-propynyl-6-nor-LSD or 6-propargyl-6-nor-LSD, is a psychedelic drug of the lysergamide family related to lysergic acid diethylamide (LSD).

== Use and effects ==
PARGY-LAD is hallucinogenic similarly to LSD, but is considerably less potent than LSD, with a dose of 160 μg producing only mild effects, and 500 μg required for full activity.

== Chemistry ==
=== Analogues ===
Analogues of PARGY-LAD include LSD, ETH-LAD, PRO-LAD, AL-LAD, BU-LAD, and MAL-LAD, among others.

== History ==
PARGY-LAD was developed by David E. Nichols and colleagues at Purdue University in the 1980s and is described by Alexander Shulgin in his 1997 book TiHKAL (Tryptamines I Have Known and Loved).

== See also ==
- Substituted lysergamide
