= Dosergoside =

Clinical data
- Other names: Lyrgosin; AF-1; N-(Dihydrolysergyl)sphingosine; N-((1S,2R,3E)-2-Hydroxy-1-(hydroxymethyl)-3-heptadecenyl)-6-methylergoline-8β-carboxamide
- Drug class: Dopamine agonist

Identifiers
- IUPAC name: (6aR,9R,10aR)-N-[(E,2S,3R)-1,3-dihydroxyoctadec-4-en-2-yl]-7-methyl-6,6a,8,9,10,10a-hexahydro-4H-indolo[4,3-fg]quinoline-9-carboxamide
- CAS Number: 87178-42-5
- PubChem CID: 9829049
- ChemSpider: 8004786
- UNII: S8674EHG6Y
- CompTox Dashboard (EPA): DTXSID201024702

Chemical and physical data
- Formula: C_{34}H_{53}N_{3}O_{3}
- Molar mass: 551.816 g·mol^{−1}
- 3D model (JSmol): Interactive image
- SMILES: CCCCCCCCCCCCC/C=C/[C@H]([C@H](CO)NC(=O)[C@@H]1C[C@H]2[C@@H](CC3=CNC4=CC=CC2=C34)N(C1)C)O
- InChI: InChI=1S/C34H53N3O3/c1-3-4-5-6-7-8-9-10-11-12-13-14-15-19-32(39)30(24-38)36-34(40)26-20-28-27-17-16-18-29-33(27)25(22-35-29)21-31(28)37(2)23-26/h15-19,22,26,28,30-32,35,38-39H,3-14,20-21,23-24H2,1-2H3,(H,36,40)/b19-15+/t26-,28-,30+,31-,32-/m1/s1; Key:DIPBYRMTSXMCIM-JSXVGJAVSA-N

Dosergoside (INN), also known as lyrgosin or N-(dihydrolysergyl)sphingosine, is a dopamine agonist of the ergoline and lysergamide families which was never marketed. It is similar in chemical structure to lysergic acid diethylamide (LSD) but is 9,10-dihydrogenated and features a sphingosine moiety in place of LSD's N,N-diethylamide group. The drug was first described in the literature by 1981.

== See also ==
- Substituted lysergamide
