= NIBR2130 =

Clinical data
- Other names: 6-(Phenylcarbamoyl)-6-nor-LSD; 9,10-Didehydro-N,N-diethyl-6-(phenylcarbamoyl)ergoline-8β-carboxamide
- Drug class: Chemokine CXCR3 receptor antagonist
- ATC code: None

Identifiers
- IUPAC name: (6aR,9R)-9-N,9-N-diethyl-7-N-phenyl-6,6a,8,9-tetrahydro-4H-indolo[4,3-fg]quinoline-7,9-dicarboxamide
- PubChem CID: 45482789
- ChemSpider: 24642519
- ChEMBL: ChEMBL584554

Chemical and physical data
- Formula: C_{26}H_{28}N_{4}O_{2}
- Molar mass: 428.536 g·mol^{−1}
- 3D model (JSmol): Interactive image
- SMILES: CCN(CC)C(=O)[C@H]1CN([C@@H]2CC3=CNC4=CC=CC(=C34)C2=C1)C(=O)NC5=CC=CC=C5
- InChI: InChI=1S/C26H28N4O2/c1-3-29(4-2)25(31)18-13-21-20-11-8-12-22-24(20)17(15-27-22)14-23(21)30(16-18)26(32)28-19-9-6-5-7-10-19/h5-13,15,18,23,27H,3-4,14,16H2,1-2H3,(H,28,32)/t18-,23-/m1/s1; Key:QIPWTYSOANVUKJ-WZONZLPQSA-N

NIBR2130, also known as 6-(phenylcarbamoyl)-6-nor-LSD, is a small-molecule chemokine CXCR3 receptor antagonist which has been used in scientific research. It is a lysergamide and is a derivative of the psychedelic drug lysergic acid diethylamide (LSD).

In contrast to LSD, NIBR2130 shows profoundly reduced affinities for monoamine receptors (IC_{50} = 750–>10,000 nM). Instead, it was surprisingly found to act as a selective and highly potent chemokine CXCR3 receptor antagonist, with an affinity (IC_{50}) of 54 nM and an inhibitory potency (IC_{50}) of 18 to 74 nM. Unlike NIBR2130, LSD itself is completely inactive at the chemokine CXCR3 receptor. NIBR2130 can fully block the chemokine CXCR3 receptor in rodents in vivo.

Various analogues of NIBR2130 have also been studied and described, with some of them substantially more potent as chemokine CXCR3 receptor antagonists and some of them acting as highly potent histamine H_{3} receptor antagonists with potential applications in treatment of narcolepsy.

NIBR2130 was first described in the scientific literature by 2008.

== See also ==
- Substituted lysergamide
