= NBOMe-LAD =

Clinical data
- Other names: LAD-NBOMe; LSD-NBOMe; NBOMe-LSD; 6-(2-Methoxybenzyl)-LAD; WO 2022/226408 Example 10; N,N-Diethyl-6-[(2-methoxyphenyl)methyl]-9,10-didehydroergoline-8β-carboxamide
- Drug class: Serotonin receptor modulator; Serotonin 5-HT_{2A} receptor agonist; Serotonergic psychedelic; Hallucinogen
- ATC code: None

Identifiers
- IUPAC name: (6aR,9R)-N,N-diethyl-7-[(2-methoxyphenyl)methyl]-6,6a,8,9-tetrahydro-4H-indolo[4,3-fg]quinoline-9-carboxamide
- PubChem CID: 166091784

Chemical and physical data
- Formula: C_{27}H_{31}N_{3}O_{2}
- Molar mass: 429.564 g·mol^{−1}
- 3D model (JSmol): Interactive image
- SMILES: CCN(CC)C(=O)[C@H]1CN([C@@H]2CC3=CNC4=CC=CC(=C34)C2=C1)CC5=CC=CC=C5OC
- InChI: InChI=1S/C27H31N3O2/c1-4-29(5-2)27(31)20-13-22-21-10-8-11-23-26(21)19(15-28-23)14-24(22)30(17-20)16-18-9-6-7-12-25(18)32-3/h6-13,15,20,24,28H,4-5,14,16-17H2,1-3H3/t20-,24-/m1/s1; Key:HPPSQDRSAGTANP-HYBUGGRVSA-N

NBOMe-LAD, also known as LSD-NBOMe, is a serotonin receptor modulator and putative psychedelic drug of the lysergamide family related to lysergic acid diethylamide (LSD). It is the N-(2-methoxybenzyl) (NBOMe) derivative of LSD.

== Pharmacology ==
=== Pharmacodynamics ===
NBOMe-LAD is known to act as an agonist of the serotonin 5-HT_{2A} receptor and to interact with other receptors, but shows dramatically reduced potency compared to LSD in vitro. At the serotonin 5-HT_{2A} receptor, it had 37-fold lower affinity, 148-fold lower activational potency in terms of calcium release, and around half the maximal efficacy in terms of calcium release relative to LSD. On the other hand, NBOMe-LAD had only about 4-fold lower potency in terms of β-arrestin recruitment along with similar activational efficacy for this pathway relative to LSD.

NBOMe-LAD produces the head-twitch response, a behavioral proxy of psychedelic effects, in rodents, but with greatly reduced potency and maximal efficacy relative to PRO-LAD and analogues. Its ED_{50} for inducing the head-twitch response was 13-fold lower than that of PRO-LAD and its maximal effect was about one-third that of PRO-LAD. However, the most efficacious dose of NBOMe-LAD was 3.2 mg/kg whereas that of PRO-LAD was 1 mg/kg.

=== Pharmacokinetics ===
NBOMe-LAD showed much faster metabolism than LSD in human and rat liver microsomes in vitro.

== History ==
NBOMe-LAD was first described in the literature by 2022. It was described in a patent by Andrew Kruegel and Gilgamesh Pharmaceuticals. Various other NBOMe-type analogues of LSD and related compounds were also described.

== See also ==
- Substituted lysergamide
- 25-NB
- PHENETH-LAD
