= 1-Formyl-LSD =

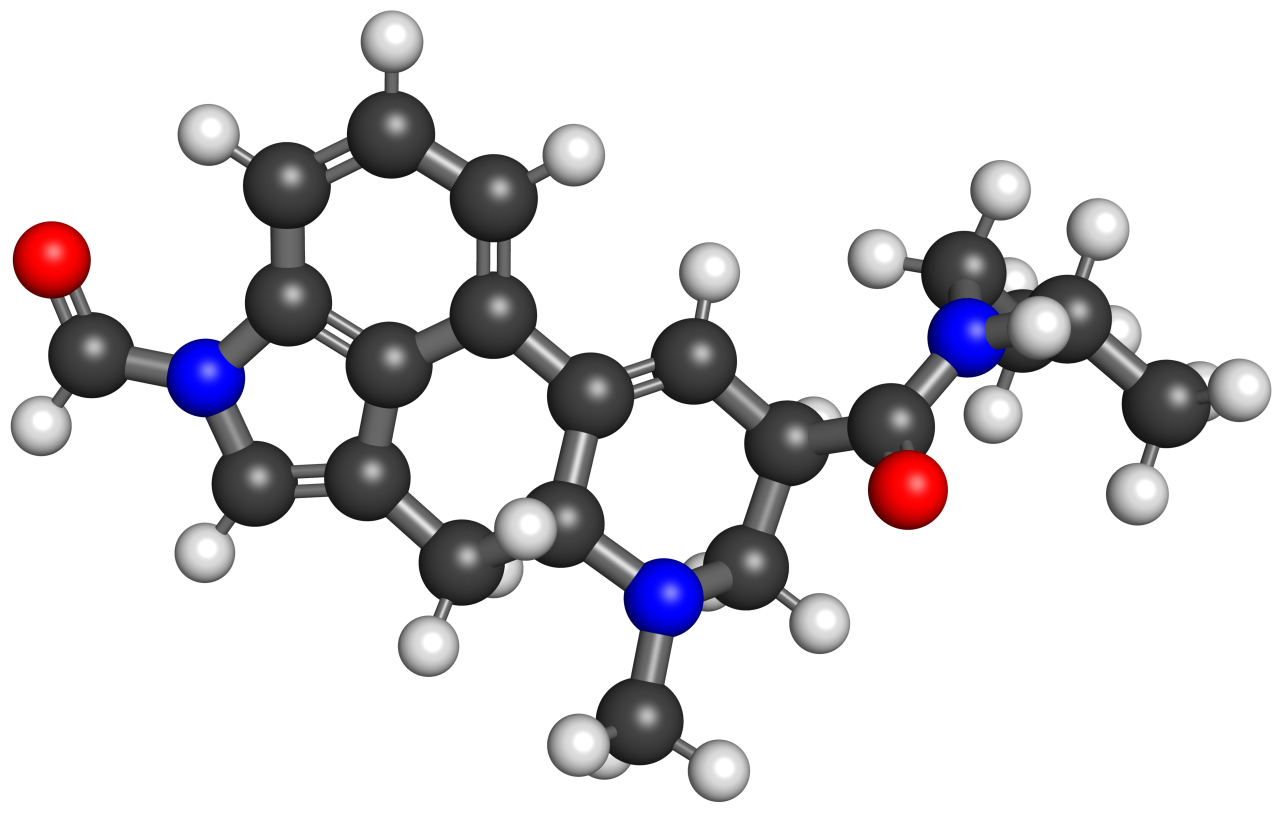

Clinical data
- Other names: 1-Formyl-LSD; 1-Formyl-N,N-diethyllysergamide; N,N-Diethyl-1-formyl-6-methyl-9,10-didehydroergoline-8β-carboxamide; 1F-LSD
- Routes of administration: Oral; Sublingual
- Drug class: Serotonergic psychedelic; Hallucinogen
- ATC code: None

Identifiers
- IUPAC name: N,N-Diethyl-1-formyl-6-methyl-9,10-didehydroergoline-8β-carboxamide

Chemical and physical data
- Formula: C_{21}H_{25}N_{3}O_{2}
- Molar mass: 351.450 g·mol^{−1}
- 3D model (JSmol): Interactive image
- SMILES: CCN(C(=O)[C@H]1CN(C)[C@H]2C(=C1)c1cccc3c1c(C2)cn3C=O)CC
- InChI: InChI=1S/C21H25N3O2/c1-4-23(5-2)21(26)15-9-17-16-7-6-8-18-20(16)14(12-24(18)13-25)10-19(17)22(3)11-15/h6-9,12-13,15,19H,4-5,10-11H2,1-3H3/t15-,19-/m1/s1; Key:SSEPNHFOVYUBHO-DNVCBOLYSA-N

1-Formyl-LSD, also known as 1-formyl-N,N-diethyllysergamide and sometimes referred to as 1F-LSD, is a psychedelic drug of the lysergamide family related to lysergic acid diethylamide (LSD). It is the 1-formyl derivative of LSD.

Another drug, 1‐(furan‐2‐carbonyl)‐LSD (SYN-L-005), has also been referred to as "1F-LSD".

== Use and effects ==
The drug is assumed to act as a prodrug of LSD. It produces psychedelic effects in humans similarly to LSD. Effective doses have been reported to be 100 to 150 μg orally or sublingually. Very little is known about the pharmacology and properties of 1-formyl-LSD.

== History ==
1-Formyl-LSD was first described in the scientific literature by 2021. It first emerged as a novel designer drug online in January 2019.

== Society and culture ==
=== Legal status ===
==== Canada ====
1-Formyl-LSD is not an explicitly nor implicitly controlled substance in Canada as of 2025.

==== United States ====
1-Formyl-LSD is not an explicitly controlled substance in the United States. However, it could be considered a controlled substance under the Federal Analogue Act if intended for human consumption.

== See also ==
- Substituted lysergamide
- Lizard Labs
