= Lumi-LSD =

Clinical data
- Other names: LumiLSD; 10-Hydroxy-9,10-dihydro-LSD; 9,10-Dihydro-10-hydroxy-LSD; 10-OH-9,10-DH-LSD; Lumilysergic acid diethylamide; N,N-Diethyl-9,10-dihydro-10-hydroxylysergamide; N,N-Diethyl-10-hydroxy-6-methylergoline-8β-carboxamide
- ATC code: None

Identifiers
- IUPAC name: (6aR,9R)-N,N-Diethyl-10a-hydroxy-7-methyl-4,6,6a,7,8,9,10,10a-octahydroindolo[4,3-fg]quinoline-9-carboxamide

Chemical and physical data
- Formula: C_{20}H_{27}N_{3}O_{2}
- Molar mass: 341.455 g·mol^{−1}
- 3D model (JSmol): Interactive image
- SMILES: CCN(C(=O)[C@H]1CN(C)[C@H]2C(C1)(O)c1cccc3c1c(C2)c[nH]3)CC
- InChI: InChI=1S/C20H27N3O2/c1-4-23(5-2)19(24)14-10-20(25)15-7-6-8-16-18(15)13(11-21-16)9-17(20)22(3)12-14/h6-8,11,14,17,21,25H,4-5,9-10,12H2,1-3H3/t14-,17-,20?/m1/s1; Key:CNOVTUIIXCTFII-TUYPYBPCSA-N

Lumi-LSD, also known as 10-hydroxy-9,10-dihydro-LSD or as N,N-diethyl-9,10-dihydro-10-hydroxylysergamide, is a lysergamide and chemical degradation product of the psychedelic drug lysergic acid diethylamide (LSD). LSD is converted into lumi-LSD by exposure to light, specifically ultraviolet light. Lumi-LSD might also be a metabolite of LSD, but this remains unconfirmed.

== Pharmacology ==
=== Pharmacodynamics ===
Lumi-LSD showed 0.01% (i.e., 10,000-fold lower) of the antiserotonergic activity of LSD in the isolated rat uterus in vitro. As such, lumi-LSD was regarded as essentially inactive in this assay. Similarly, lumi-LSD shows abolished physiological and behavioral effects in animals and is said to be inactive in terms of hallucinogenic effects in humans. Likewise, in contrast to LSD, lumi-LSD was found to be inactive in terms of electroencephalogram (EEG) changes in rabbits.

== Chemistry ==
Unlike LSD, lumi-LSD is not fluorescent.

Other lumi-lysergamides are also known.

== History ==
Lumi-LSD was first described in the scientific literature by at least 1955.

== See also ==
- Substituted lysergamide
- 9,10-Dihydro-LSD
- Iso-LSD
