= LEK-8827 =

Clinical data
- Other names: 6-Methyl-LEK-8842; 6-Methyl-N-methyl-N-(2-propynyl)lysergamide
- ATC code: None

Identifiers
- IUPAC name: (6aR,9R)-N,7,7-trimethyl-N-prop-2-ynyl-6,6a,8,9-tetrahydro-4H-indolo[4,3-fg]quinolin-7-ium-9-carboxamide
- PubChem CID: 101641108
- PubChem SID: 519938695

Chemical and physical data
- Formula: C_{21}H_{24}N_{3}O^{+}
- Molar mass: 334.443 g·mol^{−1}
- 3D model (JSmol): Interactive image
- SMILES: CN(CC#C)C(=O)[C@H]1C[N+]([C@@H]2CC3=CNC4=CC=CC(=C34)C2=C1)(C)C
- InChI: InChI=1S/C21H24N3O/c1-5-9-23(2)21(25)15-10-17-16-7-6-8-18-20(16)14(12-22-18)11-19(17)24(3,4)13-15/h1,6-8,10,12,15,19,22H,9,11,13H2,2-4H3/q+1/t15-,19-/m1/s1; Key:FBJAIHMTLDVIBD-DNVCBOLYSA-N

LEK-8827, also known as 6-methyl-LEK-8842 or as 6-methyl-N-methyl-N-(2-propynyl)lysergamide, is a chemical compound of the lysergamide family. It is the 6-methyl derivative of LEK-8842 and is a quaternary ammonium compound. The drug shows almost complete elimination of affinity for serotonin 5-HT_{2} and α-adrenergic receptors compared to LEK-8842, with no affinity for serotonin 5-HT_{2} receptors and slight but negligible affinity for α-adrenergic receptors. Its loss of activity was said to probably be due to the increased polarity of the molecule. LEK-8827 was first described in the scientific literature by 1992. It was developed by the Slovenian pharmaceutical company LEK Pharmaceuticals.

== See also ==
- Substituted lysergamide
- LEK-8842
- Nor-LSD (6-nor-LSD)
