= Lysergic acid dipropylamide =

LSDP

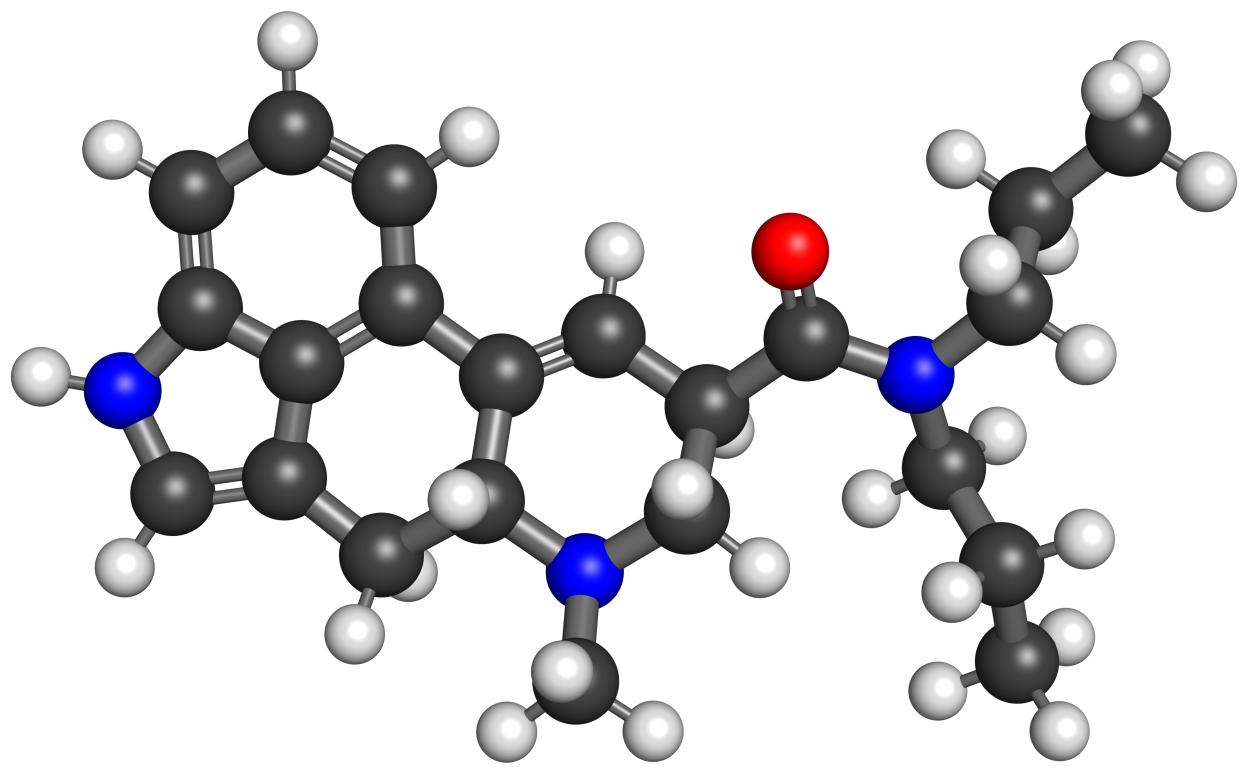

Clinical data
- Other names: Lysergic acid dipropylamide; LSDP; LSDPr; LADP; LPP; N,N-Dipropyllysergamide; DPL
- Routes of administration: Oral
- Drug class: Serotonergic psychedelic; Hallucinogen
- ATC code: None

Identifiers
- IUPAC name: (6aR,9R)-7-methyl-N,N-dipropyl-6,6a,8,9-tetrahydro-4H-indolo[4,3-fg]quinoline-9-carboxamide
- PubChem CID: 129714166

Chemical and physical data
- Formula: C_{22}H_{29}N_{3}O
- Molar mass: 351.494 g·mol^{−1}
- 3D model (JSmol): Interactive image
- SMILES: CCCN(CCC)C(=O)[C@H]1CN([C@@H]2CC3=CNC4=CC=CC(=C34)C2=C1)C
- InChI: InChI=1S/C22H29N3O/c1-4-9-25(10-5-2)22(26)16-11-18-17-7-6-8-19-21(17)15(13-23-19)12-20(18)24(3)14-16/h6-8,11,13,16,20,23H,4-5,9-10,12,14H2,1-3H3/t16-,20-/m1/s1; Key:QKKQYCDPPPJVQI-OXQOHEQNSA-N

Lysergic acid dipropylamide (LSDP), also known as N,N-dipropyllysergamide (DPL), is a psychedelic drug of the lysergamide family related to lysergic acid diethylamide (LSD). It is the analogue of LSD in which the amide group has two propyl substitutions instead of two ethyl substituents.

The drug has about 10% or less of the potency of LSD as a psychedelic and its dose is greater than 1 mg orally. It has been reported however that, in contrast to LSD, LSDP produces LSD-like autonomic effects at much lower doses (<1 mg) than those at which its psychedelic effects occur. The drug was initially thought to be non-hallucinogenic after only being tested at sub-milligram doses.

LSDP was first described in the literature by Albert Hofmann and colleagues by 1955. Unlike various other LSD analogues, it was never given a specific code name (as in e.g. "LSD-25"). Its psychedelic effects were also reported by Hofmann.

== See also ==
- Substituted lysergamide
- Lysergic acid methylpropylamide (LAMPA)
- Lysergic acid dimethylamide (DAM-57)
- Lysergic acid dibutylamide (LBB-66)
- Lysergic acid diallylamide (DAL)
- Ethylpropyllysergamide (EPLA)
