= BU-LAD =

Chemical compound

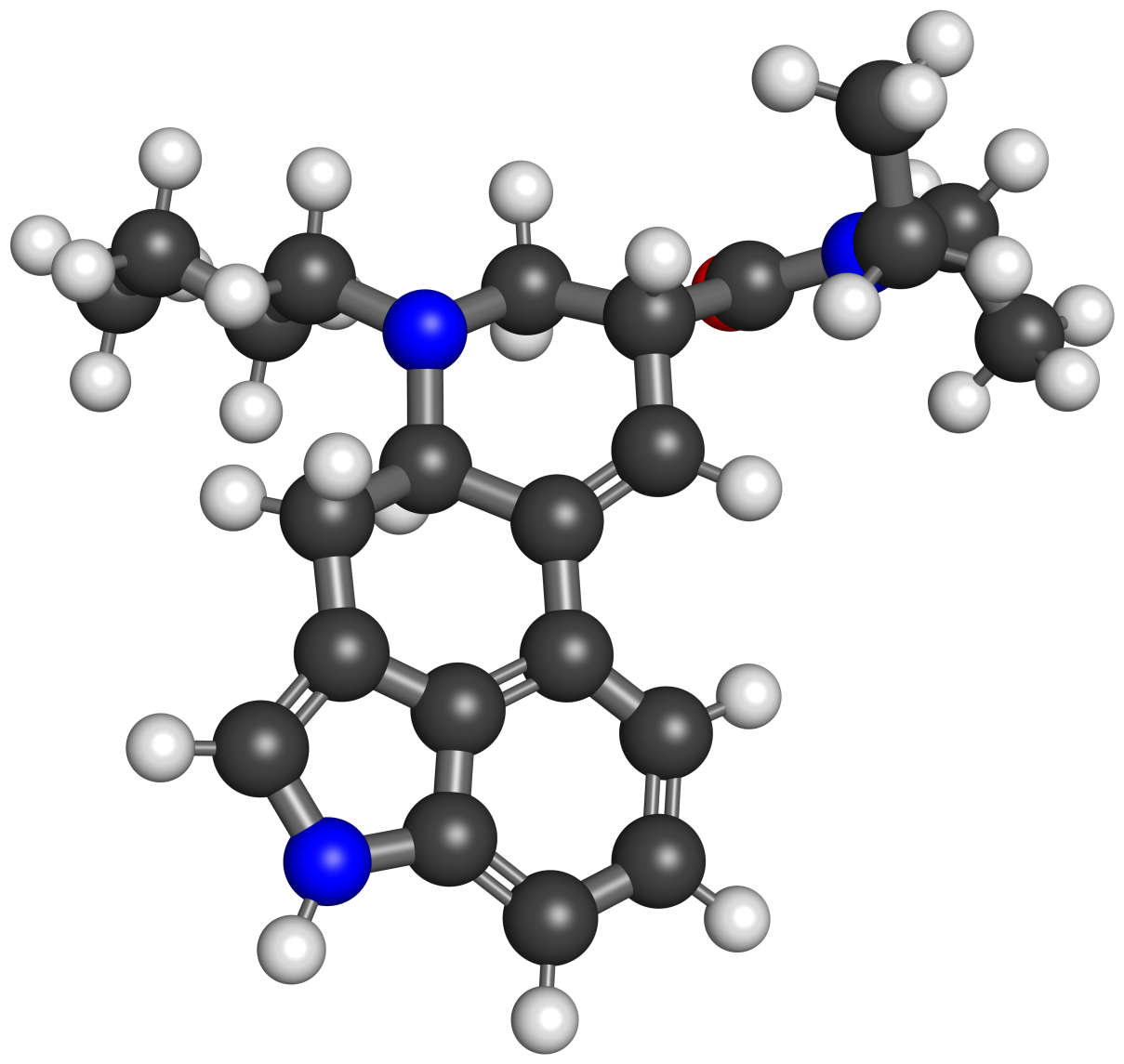

Clinical data
- Other names: BU-LAD; BULAD; 6-Butyl-6-nor-LSD; 6-Butyl-6-nor-Lysergic acid diethylamide
- Routes of administration: Oral
- Drug class: Serotonergic psychedelic; Hallucinogen

Legal status
- Legal status: US: Analogue to a Schedule I/II drug (but only if it is intended for human consumption)

Identifiers
- IUPAC name: (6aR,9R)-7-butyl-N,N-diethyl-4,6,6a,7,8,9- hexahydroindolo[4,3-fg]quinoline-9-carboxamide
- CAS Number: 96930-87-9
- PubChem CID: 44457782
- ChemSpider: 21106266
- UNII: 4Z2TQQ6ZTC
- ChEMBL: ChEMBL22520
- CompTox Dashboard (EPA): DTXSID901165228

Chemical and physical data
- Formula: C_{23}H_{31}N_{3}O
- Molar mass: 365.521 g·mol^{−1}
- 3D model (JSmol): Interactive image
- SMILES: CCN(CC)C(=O)[C@@H]2C=C1c3cccc4[nH]cc(C[C@H]1N(C2)CCCC)c34
- InChI: InChI=1S/C23H31N3O/c1-4-7-11-26-15-17(23(27)25(5-2)6-3)12-19-18-9-8-10-20-22(18)16(14-24-20)13-21(19)26/h8-10,12,14,17,21,24H,4-7,11,13,15H2,1-3H3/t17-,21-/m1/s1; Key:VTVHSIXDKKKTMT-DYESRHJHSA-N

BU-LAD, also known as 6-butyl-6-nor-LSD or 6-butyl-6-nor-lysergic acid diethylamide, is a psychedelic drug and analogue of lysergic acid diethylamide (LSD) first described by David E. Nichols and colleagues in the 1980s.

== Use and effects ==
According to Alexander Shulgin in his book TiHKAL (Tryptamines I Have Known and Loved), BU-LAD is a psychedelic drug similar to LSD, but is significantly less potent than LSD, with a dose of 500 μg orally producing only mild effects.

== Pharmacology ==
=== Pharmacodynamics ===
BU-LAD substitutes for LSD in rodent drug discrimination tests. However, it has 13-fold reduced potency relative to LSD itself and 37- to 42-fold lower potency than ETH-LAD and AL-LAD in this test.

== Chemistry ==
=== Analogues ===
Analogues of BU-LAD include LSD, ETH-LAD, PRO-LAD, AL-LAD, PARGY-LAD, and MAL-LAD, among others.

== See also ==
- Substituted lysergamide
