= 2-Oxo-LSD =

Clinical data
- Other names: 2-Oxy-LSD; O-LSD; 2-Keto-LSD; 2-Oxo-2,3-dihydro-LSD; N,N-Diethyl-6-methyl-2-oxo-9,10-didehydro-2,3-dihydroergoline-8β-carboxamide
- ATC code: None

Identifiers
- IUPAC name: (6aR,9R)-N,N-diethyl-7-methyl-5-oxo-4,5a,6,6a,8,9-hexahydroindolo[4,3-fg]quinoline-9-carboxamide
- PubChem CID: 101635360

Chemical and physical data
- Formula: C_{20}H_{25}N_{3}O_{2}
- Molar mass: 339.439 g·mol^{−1}
- 3D model (JSmol): Interactive image
- SMILES: CCN(CC)C(=O)[C@H]1CN([C@@H]2CC3C4=C(C2=C1)C=CC=C4NC3=O)C
- InChI: InChI=1S/C20H25N3O2/c1-4-23(5-2)20(25)12-9-14-13-7-6-8-16-18(13)15(19(24)21-16)10-17(14)22(3)11-12/h6-9,12,15,17H,4-5,10-11H2,1-3H3,(H,21,24)/t12-,15?,17-/m1/s1; Key:LEPCXKMUXAQZKG-XURPUJGUSA-N

2-Oxo-LSD, also known as 2-oxy-LSD or 2-keto-LSD, or more fully as 2-oxo-2,3-dihydro-LSD, is a lysergamide and metabolite of the psychedelic drug lysergic acid diethylamide (LSD). It is a metabolite of LSD in both humans and various animal species, although there are important differences in LSD metabolism and relative proportions of metabolites between species.

== Metabolism ==
2-Oxo-LSD is formed directly from LSD in the body and is also possibly an intermediate in the generation of LSD's major metabolite 2-oxo-3-hydroxy-LSD (O-H-LSD), which is present in urine at concentrations 4 to 40 times those of LSD in humans. However, O-H-LSD may also form from other metabolites, such as 3-hydroxy-LSD. The specific enzymes responsible for the generation of individual LSD metabolites like 2-oxo-LSD are largely unknown. However, several cytochrome P450 enzymes were investigated and implicated in the formation of O-H-LSD in 2019.

== Pharmacology ==
2-Oxo-LSD showed absence of various pharmacological effects in animals. In contrast to LSD and certain other metabolites like 13-hydroxy-LSD, 2-oxo-LSD failed to produce LSD-like electroencephalogram (EEG) changes in rabbits. 2-Oxo-LSD at a dose of 300 μg orally produced no psychoactive effects in a human subject who had previously responded to 30 μg LSD. It was concluded that 2-oxo-LSD shows no LSD-like activity in the central nervous system and hence is inactive. 2-Oxo-LSD's derivative O-H-LSD showed profound loss of activity at the serotonin 5-HT_{2} receptors compared to LSD in vitro. 2-Oxo-LSD is said to readily enter the brain.

== Chemistry ==
2-Oxo-LSD contains most of the clinically used dopamine D_{2}-like receptor agonist and antiparkinsonian agent ropinirole within its chemical structure.

== History ==
2-Oxo-LSD was first described in the scientific literature by Julius Axelrod and colleagues in 1957.

== See also ==
- Substituted lysergamide
- 2-Oxo-3-hydroxy-LSD
- 2,3-Dihydro-LSD
- Nor-LSD
- Lysergic acid ethyl-2-hydroxyethylamide (LEO)
- Lysergic acid ethylamide (LAE)
- 13-Hydroxy-LSD
- 14-Hydroxy-LSD
- 2-Bromo-LSD
- 2-Iodo-LSD
