= OML-632 =

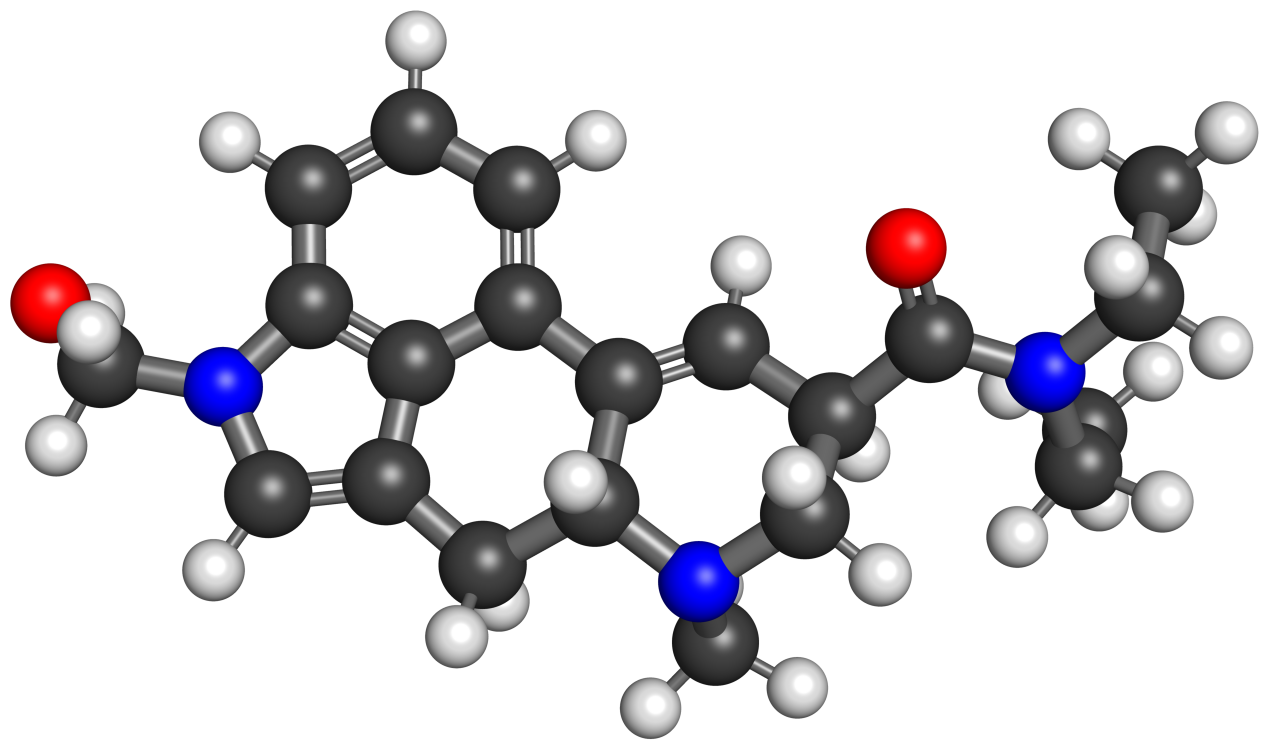

Clinical data
- Other names: OML-632; OML632; 1-Hydroxymethyllysergic acid diethylamide; 1-Hydroxymethyl-d-lysergic acid diethylamide; 1-Oxy-methyl-LSD; 1-Oxymethyl-LSD; Oxymethyl-LSD
- Routes of administration: Oral
- Drug class: Serotonin receptor modulator; Serotonergic psychedelic; Hallucinogen
- ATC code: None

Identifiers
- IUPAC name: (6aR,9R)-N,N-Diethyl-4-(hydroxymethyl)-7-methyl-4,6,6a,7,8,9-hexahydroindolo[4,3-fg]quinoline-9-carboxamide
- CAS Number: 114004-70-5

Chemical and physical data
- Formula: C_{21}H_{27}N_{3}O_{2}
- Molar mass: 353.466 g·mol^{−1}
- 3D model (JSmol): Interactive image
- SMILES: CCN(C(=O)[C@H]1CN(C)[C@H]2C(=C1)c1cccc3c1c(C2)cn3CO)CC
- InChI: InChI=1S/C21H27N3O2/c1-4-23(5-2)21(26)15-9-17-16-7-6-8-18-20(16)14(12-24(18)13-25)10-19(17)22(3)11-15/h6-9,12,15,19,25H,4-5,10-11,13H2,1-3H3/t15-,19-/m1/s1; Key:MCNBQMJSTKRHKK-DNVCBOLYSA-N

OML-632, also known as 1-hydroxymethyllysergic acid diethylamide (1-hydroxymethyl-LSD), is a psychedelic drug of the lysergamide family related to lysergic acid diethylamide (LSD).

== Pharmacology ==
=== Pharmacodynamics ===
OML-632 has about 66% of the hallucinogenic potency of LSD in humans (which is stated as active at 50–100 μg) and about 59% of the antiserotonergic activity of LSD in the isolated rat uterus in vitro. However, OML-632 may simply act as a prodrug of LSD. It has also been said to serve as a metabolic intermediate in the demethylation of 1-methyl-LSD (MLD-41) into LSD.

== History ==
OML-632 was first described in the scientific literature by 1957. The compound has been mistakenly referred to as "1-methoxy-LSD" or "1-MeO-LSD" in some publications.

== See also ==
- Substituted lysergamide
- MLD-41 (1-methyl-LSD)
- ALD-52 (1-acetyl-LSD)
- 1P-LSD (1-propionyl-LSD)
