= 2-Oxo-3-hydroxy-LSD =

Clinical data
- Other names: 2-Oxy-3-hydroxy-LSD; OH-LSD; O-H-LSD; 2-Oxo-3-OH-LSD; 2-Oxo-3-hydroxy-2,3-dihydro-LSD; 2-Oxo-3-hydroxylysergide; 2-Oxo-3-hydroxylysergic acid diethylamide; N,N-Diethyl-2,3-dihydro-2-oxo-3-hydroxylysergamide; N,N-Diethyl-3-hydroxy-6-methyl-2-oxo-9,10-didehydro-2,3-dihydroergoline-8β-carboxamide
- Drug class: Serotonin receptor modulator
- ATC code: None

Identifiers
- IUPAC name: (6aR,9R)-N,N-diethyl-5a-hydroxy-7-methyl-5-oxo-6,6a,8,9-tetrahydro-4H-indolo[4,3-fg]quinoline-9-carboxamide
- CAS Number: 111295-09-1
- PubChem CID: 10155149
- ChemSpider: 8330657
- UNII: KU55DR6345
- CompTox Dashboard (EPA): DTXSID00436244

Chemical and physical data
- Formula: C_{20}H_{25}N_{3}O_{3}
- Molar mass: 355.438 g·mol^{−1}
- 3D model (JSmol): Interactive image
- SMILES: CCN(CC)C(=O)[C@H]1CN([C@@H]2CC3(C4=C(C2=C1)C=CC=C4NC3=O)O)C
- InChI: InChI=1S/C20H25N3O3/c1-4-23(5-2)18(24)12-9-14-13-7-6-8-15-17(13)20(26,19(25)21-15)10-16(14)22(3)11-12/h6-9,12,16,26H,4-5,10-11H2,1-3H3,(H,21,25)/t12-,16-,20?/m1/s1; Key:YSZSHHCNLVHCNV-VRORWYBRSA-N

2-Oxo-3-hydroxy-LSD, or 2-oxy-3-hydroxy-LSD, also known as O-H-LSD or OH-LSD, as well as more fully as 2-oxo-3-hydroxy-2,3-dihydro-LSD, is a lysergamide and the major metabolite of the psychedelic drug lysergic acid diethylamide (LSD). LSD is eliminated 13% as O-H-LSD in urine within 24 hours and urinary concentrations of O-H-LSD are 4 to 40 times those of LSD in humans.

The specific enzymes responsible for the formation of O-H-LSD from LSD are unclear. However, subsequent research found involvement of several cytochrome P450 enzymes. O-H-LSD is thought to form from other LSD metabolites like 2-oxo-LSD and 3-hydroxy-LSD.

It is unknown whether O-H-LSD is pharmacologically active or produces hallucinogenic effects. However, O-H-LSD showed profoundly reduced albeit still detectable activity at the serotonin 5-HT_{2} receptors, including the serotonin 5-HT_{2A}, 5-HT_{2B}, and 5-HT_{2C} receptors, compared to LSD in vitro.

O-H-LSD was first described in the scientific literature by at least the 1990s. It started being sold online as an analytical standard by 2024.

== See also ==
- Substituted lysergamide
- 2-Oxo-LSD
- 2,3-Dihydro-LSD
- Nor-LSD
- Lysergic acid ethyl-2-hydroxyethylamide (LEO)
- Lysergic acid ethylamide (LAE)
- 13-Hydroxy-LSD
- 14-Hydroxy-LSD
