= 1D-AL-LAD =

Clinical data
- Other names: 1D-AL-LAD; 1-(1,2-Dimethylcyclobutane-1-carbonyl)-AL-LAD; 1-(1,2-Dimethylcyclobutanecarbonyl)-6-allyl-nor-LSD
- Routes of administration: Oral
- Drug class: Serotonergic psychedelic; Hallucinogen
- ATC code: None

Pharmacokinetic data
- Onset of action: Peak: 2–2.5 hours
- Duration of action: 12 hours

Chemical and physical data
- Formula: C_{29}H_{36}N_{3}O_{2}
- Molar mass: 458.626 g·mol^{−1}
- 3D model (JSmol): Interactive image
- SMILES: C=CCN1C[C@H](C(N(CC)CC)=O)C=C2C3C=CC=C4C3C(C[C@]21[H])=CN4C(C5(CCC5([H])C)C)=O
- InChI: InChI=1S/C29H39N3O2/c1-6-14-31-17-21(27(33)30(7-2)8-3)15-23-22-10-9-11-24-26(22)20(16-25(23)31)18-32(24)28(34)29(5)13-12-19(29)4/h6,9-11,15,18-19,21-22,25-26H,1,7-8,12-14,16-17H2,2-5H3/t19?,21-,22?,25-,26?,29?/m1/s1; Key:KPVPOQRPQTTWNN-JDXRDVCZSA-N

1D-AL-LAD, also known as 1-(1,2-dimethylcyclobutane-1-carbonyl)-AL-LAD, is a psychedelic drug of the lysergamide family related to AL-LAD. It is thought to be a prodrug of AL-LAD similarly to how 1D-LSD is a prodrug of LSD. 1D-AL-LAD was encountered online as a novel designer drug in 2023 and 2024. It is said to have a dose of 100 to 300 μg orally, a time to peak effects of 2 to 2.5 hours, and a duration of 12 hours. The drug is said have "half the intensity" of LSD, with its effects including psychedelic visuals among others. Although 1D-AL-LAD has reported to have been sold, some or all of the sold product appears to have actually been mislabeled 1T-AL-LAD. 1D-AL-LAD is not an explicitly controlled substance in the United States or in Canada.

== See also ==
- Substituted lysergamide
