= LBB-66 =

Clinical data
- Other names: LBB66; LA-dibutylamide; Lysergic acid dibutylamide; N,N-Dibutyllysergamide; N,N-Dibutyl-6-methyl-9,10-didehydroergoline-8β-carboxamide
- Drug class: Serotonin receptor modulator
- ATC code: None

Identifiers
- IUPAC name: (6aR,9R)-N,N-dibutyl-7-methyl-6,6a,8,9-tetrahydro-4H-indolo[4,3-fg]quinoline-9-carboxamide
- PubChem CID: 92260373
- ChemSpider: 270008

Chemical and physical data
- Formula: C_{24}H_{33}N_{3}O
- Molar mass: 379.548 g·mol^{−1}
- 3D model (JSmol): Interactive image
- SMILES: CCCCN(CCCC)C(=O)[C@H]1CN([C@@H]2CC3=CNC4=CC=CC(=C34)C2=C1)C
- InChI: InChI=1S/C24H33N3O/c1-4-6-11-27(12-7-5-2)24(28)18-13-20-19-9-8-10-21-23(19)17(15-25-21)14-22(20)26(3)16-18/h8-10,13,15,18,22,25H,4-7,11-12,14,16H2,1-3H3/t18-,22-/m1/s1; Key:GVTRJLOTMIDJSS-XMSQKQJNSA-N

LBB-66, also known as lysergic acid dibutylamide or as N,N-dibutyllysergamide, is a serotonin receptor modulator of the lysergamide family related to lysergic acid diethylamide (LSD; LSD-25). It is the derivative of LSD in which the N,N-diethyl groups have been replaced with N,N-dibutyl groups.

The drug has about 31% or around one-third of the antiserotonergic activity of LSD in the isolated rat uterus in vitro. In contrast to other assessed lysergamides, it has been said to bind practically irreversibly in this context. Unlike LSD, LBB-66 is said to be devoid of psychedelic effects in humans, with a hallucinogenic potency relative to LSD of 0% stated, but the tested doses not given.

LBB-66 was first described in the scientific literature by Albert Hofmann and colleagues by 1955.

== See also ==
- Substituted lysergamide
- Lysergic acid dimethylamide (DAM-57)
- Lysergic acid dipropylamide (DPL)
- Lysergic acid diallylamide (DAL)
- Lysergic acid butylamide (LAB)
