= Propisergide =

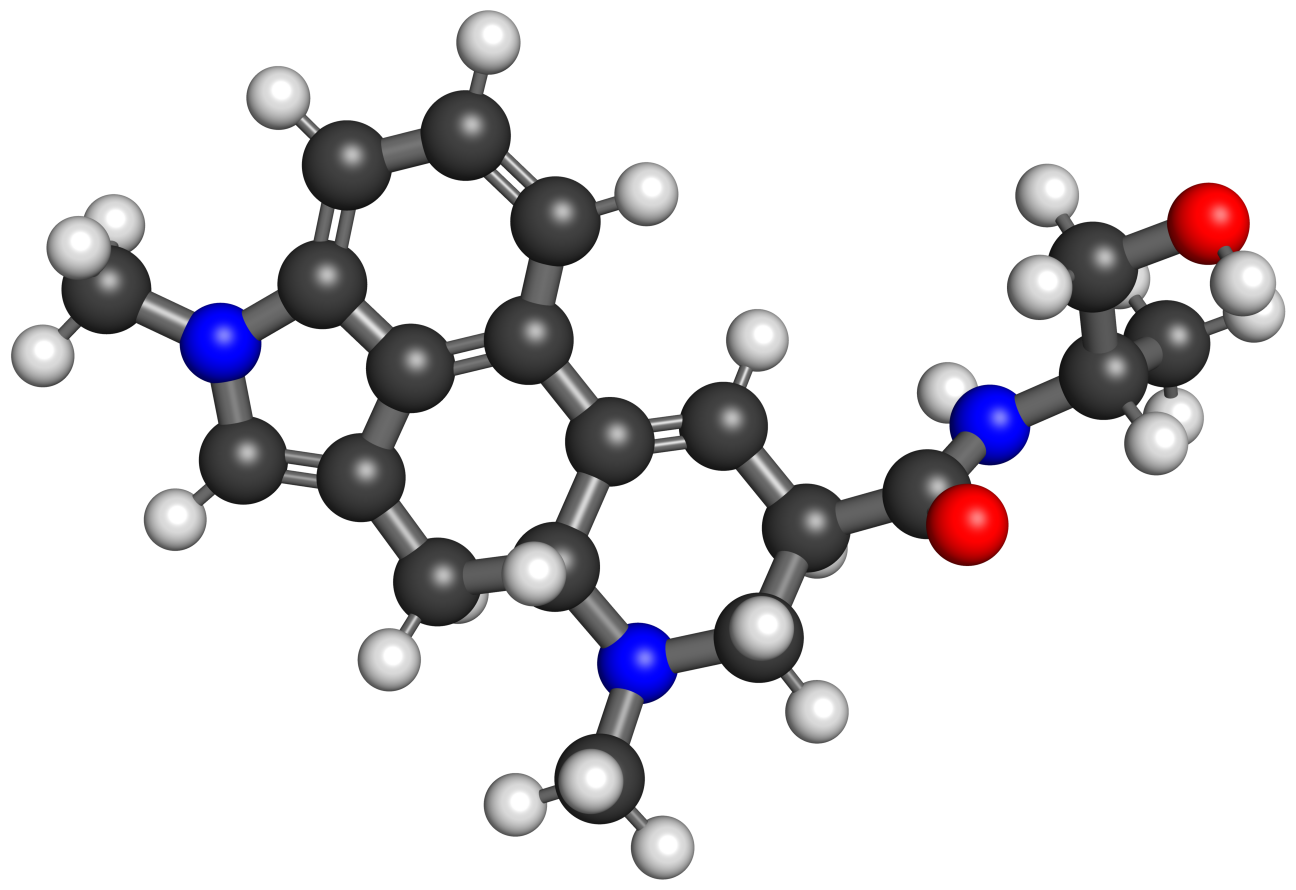

Clinical data
- Other names: PML-946; PML946; Ergalgin; N-Methylergobasine; N-Methylergonovine; N-Methylergometrine; 1-Methylergonovine
- Routes of administration: Oral
- Drug class: Serotonin receptor modulator; Antimigraine agent
- ATC code: None

Identifiers
- IUPAC name: (6aR,9R)-N-[(2S)-1-hydroxypropan-2-yl]-4,7-dimethyl-6,6a,8,9-tetrahydroindolo[4,3-fg]quinoline-9-carboxamide
- CAS Number: 5793-04-4
- PubChem CID: 20055549
- ChemSpider: 16737112
- UNII: 1Q1AWW2JET
- ChEMBL: ChEMBL3989790
- CompTox Dashboard (EPA): DTXSID701018134

Chemical and physical data
- Formula: C_{20}H_{25}N_{3}O_{2}
- Molar mass: 339.439 g·mol^{−1}
- 3D model (JSmol): Interactive image
- SMILES: C[C@@H](CO)NC(=O)[C@H]1CN([C@@H]2CC3=CN(C4=CC=CC(=C34)C2=C1)C)C
- InChI: InChI=1S/C20H25N3O2/c1-12(11-24)21-20(25)14-7-16-15-5-4-6-17-19(15)13(9-22(17)2)8-18(16)23(3)10-14/h4-7,9,12,14,18,24H,8,10-11H2,1-3H3,(H,21,25)/t12-,14+,18+/m0/s1; Key:XUKAVPATXGYVKJ-WPKBUWHJSA-N

Propisergide (INN; developmental code name PML-946), also known as ergalgin or as N-methylergometrine or 1-methylergometrine, is a serotonin receptor modulator and antimigraine agent of the ergoline and lysergamide families which was never marketed. It is the 1-methyl derivative of ergometrine (ergonovine) and is a close analogue of methylergonovine and methysergide (UML-491). Extensive metabolism of other 1-methylated lysergamides to their secondary amine derivatives, for instance methysergide (1-methylmethylergometrine) conversion into methylergometrine, has been observed. Propisergide has 259% of the antiserotonergic activity of LSD. Its average clinical dose range for preventative treatment of migraine is 1 to 3 mg orally. Propisergide was first described in the literature by 1958 and then further around 1980 and after.

== See also ==
- Substituted lysergamide
- Methysergide (UML-491)
