= Diallyllysergamide =

Chemical compound

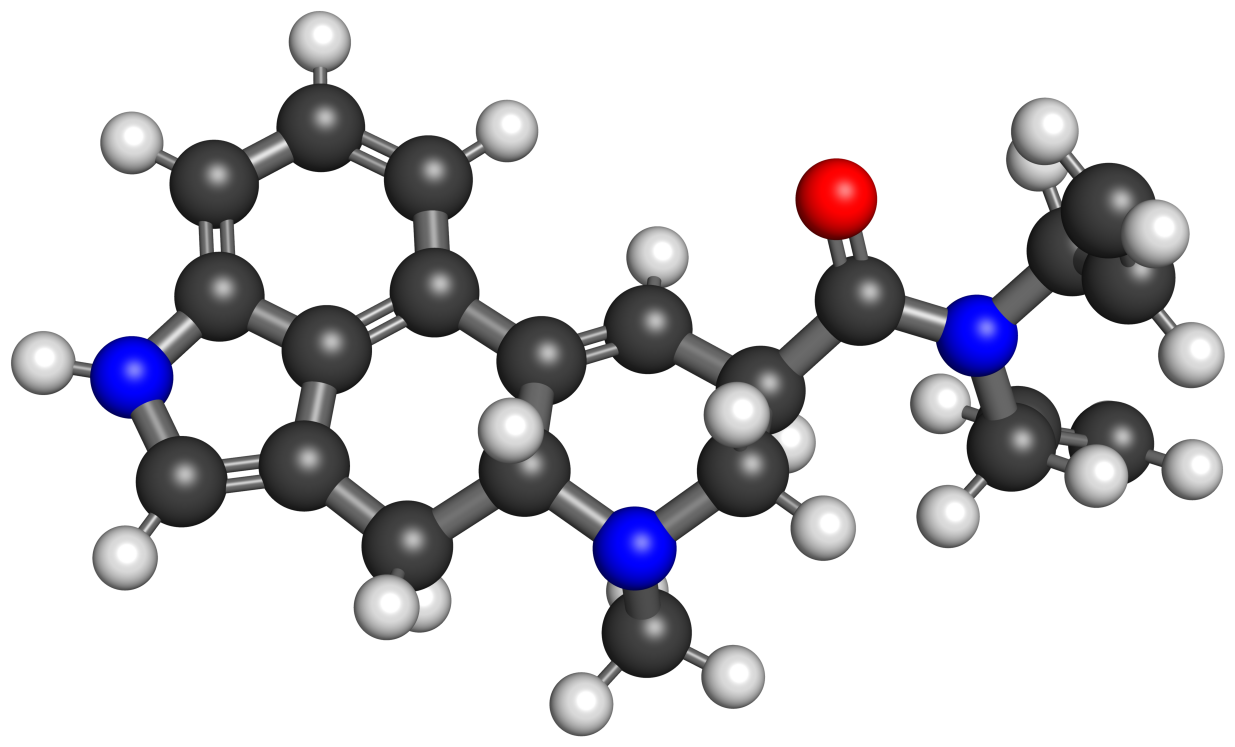

Clinical data
- Other names: DAL; Lysergic acid diallylamide; LDA; d-Lysergic acid diallylamide; d-Diallyllysergamide
- Routes of administration: Oral
- Drug class: Serotonergic psychedelic; Hallucinogen
- ATC code: None

Legal status
- Legal status: US: Analogue to a Schedule I/II drug (but only if it is intended for human consumption)

Identifiers
- IUPAC name: (6aR,9R)-N,N-Diallyl-7-methyl-4,6,6a,7,8,9-hexahydroindolo-[4,3-fg]quinoline-9-carboxamide
- CAS Number: 73032-97-0
- PubChem CID: 57481013
- ChemSpider: 21106294
- CompTox Dashboard (EPA): DTXSID501046535
- ECHA InfoCard: 100.163.206

Chemical and physical data
- Formula: C_{22}H_{25}N_{3}O
- Molar mass: 347.462 g·mol^{−1}
- 3D model (JSmol): Interactive image
- SMILES: C=CCN(CC=C)C(=O)[C@@H]2C=C1c3cccc4[nH]cc(C[C@H]1N(C)C2)c34
- InChI: InChI=1S/C22H25N3O/c1-4-9-25(10-5-2)22(26)16-11-18-17-7-6-8-19-21(17)15(13-23-19)12-20(18)24(3)14-16/h4-8,11,13,16,20,23H,1-2,9-10,12,14H2,3H3/t16-,20-/m1/s1; Key:VAMQYGHNZLRSSA-OXQOHEQNSA-N

N,N-Diallyllysergamide (DAL), also known as lysergic acid diallylamide (LDA), is a psychedelic drug of the lysergamide family related to lysergic acid diethylamide (LSD). It is taken orally.

== Use and effects ==
In his 1997 book TiHKAL (Tryptamines I Have Known and Loved), Alexander Shulgin described DAL as producing "at best a touch of sparkle" of LSD at dose of 600 μg of the tartrate salt taken orally, but as also producing a sedation. Subsequently, in a 2003 literature review, Shulgin listed an active dose as greater than 1 mg. He has described the drug as being at least an order of magnitude less potent than LSD.

== Pharmacology ==
=== Pharmacodynamics ===
DAL interacts with serotonin receptors, including the serotonin 5-HT_{1A}, 5-HT_{2A}, and 5-HT_{2C} receptors. It acts as a serotonin 5-HT_{2A} receptor agonist, but with about 5-fold lower potency than LSD.

== See also ==
- Substituted lysergamide
- Lysergic acid dimethylamide (DAM-57)
- Lysergic acid dipropylamide (DPL)
- Lysergic acid dibutylamide (LBB-66)
- Substituted tryptamine
