= PHENETH-LAD =

Clinical data
- Other names: PHENETHLAD; PHENETHY-LAD; PHENETHYLAD; 6-(β-Phenethyl)-6-nor-LSD; N-Phenethyl-nor-LSD; N,N-Diethyl-6-phenethyl-6-norlysergamide; N,N-Diethyl-6-(2-phenylethyl)-9,10-didehydroergoline-8β-carboxamide
- ATC code: None

Identifiers
- IUPAC name: (6aR,9R)-N,N-diethyl-7-(2-phenylethyl)-6,6a,8,9-tetrahydro-4H-indolo[4,3-fg]quinoline-9-carboxamide
- PubChem CID: 44457779
- ChemSpider: 23120272
- ChEMBL: ChEMBL23046

Chemical and physical data
- Formula: C_{27}H_{31}N_{3}O
- Molar mass: 413.565 g·mol^{−1}
- 3D model (JSmol): Interactive image
- SMILES: CCN(CC)C(=O)[C@H]1CN([C@@H]2CC3=CNC4=CC=CC(=C34)C2=C1)CCC5=CC=CC=C5
- InChI: InChI=1S/C27H31N3O/c1-3-29(4-2)27(31)21-15-23-22-11-8-12-24-26(22)20(17-28-24)16-25(23)30(18-21)14-13-19-9-6-5-7-10-19/h5-12,15,17,21,25,28H,3-4,13-14,16,18H2,1-2H3/t21-,25-/m1/s1; Key:YCWXYUACPTXUEC-PXDATVDWSA-N

PHENETH-LAD, or PHENETHY-LAD, also known as 6-(β-phenethyl)-6-nor-LSD, is a drug of the lysergamide family related to lysergic acid diethylamide (LSD). It is the derivative of LSD in which the methyl group at the 6 position has been replaced with a phenylethyl moiety.

The drug failed to substitute for LSD in rodent drug discrimination tests, with a maximum of 25 or 50% LSD-appropriate responding at the highest assessed dose. Unlike other 6-substituted lysergamides, PHENETH-LAD was not assessed at the serotonin receptors. According to Alexander Shulgin in his book TiHKAL (Tryptamines I Have Known and Loved), PHENETH-LAD produced no effects in humans at a dose of 500 μg. He has specified the potentially active dose as being >350 μg and its hallucinogenic potency being less than 30% of that of LSD.

PHENETH-LAD was first described in the scientific literature by Andrew Joseph Hoffman of the lab of David E. Nichols at Purdue University in 1985. Its effects in humans were first described by Shulgin by 1994.

== See also ==
- Substituted lysergamide
- NBOMe-LAD
