= MBL-61 =

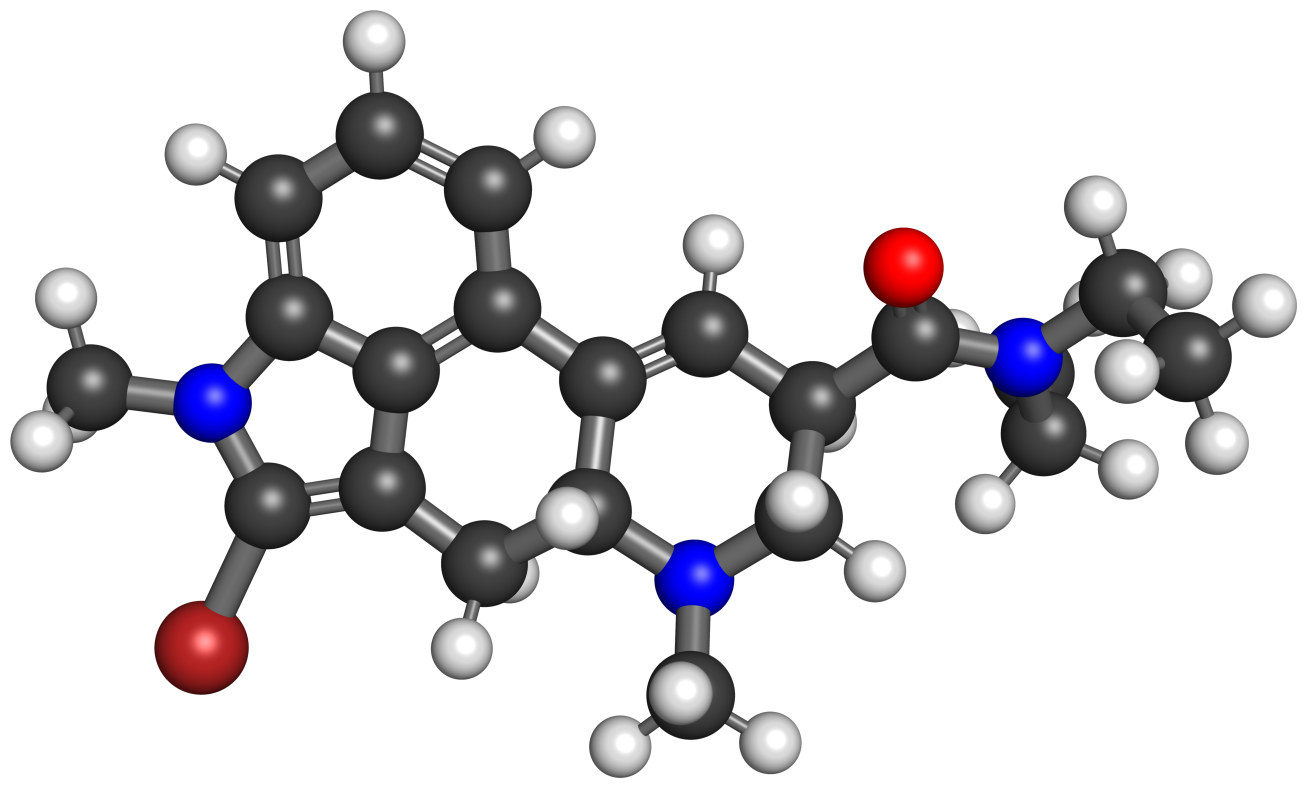

Clinical data
- Other names: MBL61; MOB-61; MOB61; 2-Bromo-1-methyl-LSD; 1-Methyl-2-bromo-LSD; 1-Methyl-BOL-148; 2-Bromo-1-methyl-N,N-diethyllysergamide; 2-Bromo-1-methyl-lysergic acid diethylamide; 2-Bromo-N,N-diethyl-1,6-dimethyl-9,10-didehydroergoline-8β-carboxamide
- Routes of administration: Oral
- Drug class: Serotonin receptor modulator
- ATC code: None

Identifiers
- IUPAC name: (6aR,9R)-5-bromo-N,N-diethyl-4,7-dimethyl-6,6a,8,9-tetrahydroindolo[4,3-fg]quinoline-9-carboxamide
- CAS Number: 50484-98-5
- PubChem CID: 170844
- ChemSpider: 149365
- UNII: 40H37184BJ
- CompTox Dashboard (EPA): DTXSID90964708

Chemical and physical data
- Formula: C_{21}H_{26}BrN_{3}O
- Molar mass: 416.363 g·mol^{−1}
- 3D model (JSmol): Interactive image
- SMILES: CCN(CC)C(=O)[C@H]1CN([C@@H]2CC3=C(N(C4=CC=CC(=C34)C2=C1)C)Br)C
- InChI: InChI=1S/C21H26BrN3O/c1-5-25(6-2)21(26)13-10-15-14-8-7-9-17-19(14)16(20(22)24(17)4)11-18(15)23(3)12-13/h7-10,13,18H,5-6,11-12H2,1-4H3/t13-,18-/m1/s1; Key:KLMFUBCMJSPRPY-FZKQIMNGSA-N

MBL-61, or MOB-61, also known as 1-methyl-2-bromo-LSD, is a serotonin receptor modulator of the lysergamide family related to lysergic acid diethylamide (LSD). It is the 1-methyl derivative of 2-bromo-LSD (BOL-148). Extensive metabolism of other 1-methylated lysergamides to their secondary amine derivatives, for instance methysergide (1-methylmethylergometrine) conversion into methylergometrine, has been observed. Similarly to the case of 2-bromo-LSD, MBL-61 was inactive as a psychedelic in humans at doses of up to 10 to 14 mg orally. However, whereas 2-bromo-LSD can reportedly still produce some hallucinogenic effects at high doses, such effects are said to be completely lost in the case of MBL-61. In any case, both drugs are still potent serotonin receptor modulators like LSD, with MBL-61 having 5.3-fold the antiserotonergic activity of LSD in vitro and the highest degree of antiserotonergic activity of any other assessed lysergamide. MBL-61 was first described in the scientific literature by Albert Hofmann and colleagues in 1957.

== See also ==
- Substituted lysergamide
- BOL-148 (2-bromo-LSD)
- 1P-BOL-148
- 1-Methyl-2-iodo-LSD (MIL)
- 2-Iodo-LSD
- MLD-41 (1-methyl-LSD)
- Methysergide
