= 2-Iodo-LSD =

Clinical data
- Other names: Iodo-LSD; Iodine-LSD; IOL; 2-Iodolysergic acid diethylamide; 2-Iodo-N,N-diethyllysergamide; N,N-Diethyl-2-iodo-6-methyl-9,10-didehydroergoline-8β-carboxamide
- Drug class: Serotonin receptor modulator; Non-hallucinogenic serotonin 5-HT_{2A} receptor modulator
- ATC code: None

Identifiers
- IUPAC name: (6aR,9R)-N,N-diethyl-5-iodo-7-methyl-6,6a,8,9-tetrahydro-4H-indolo[4,3-fg]quinoline-9-carboxamide
- CAS Number: 3712-25-2
- PubChem CID: 151142
- ChemSpider: 133214
- ChEMBL: ChEMBL433352
- CompTox Dashboard (EPA): DTXSID30958287

Chemical and physical data
- Formula: C_{20}H_{24}IN_{3}O
- Molar mass: 449.336 g·mol^{−1}
- 3D model (JSmol): Interactive image
- SMILES: CCN(CC)C(=O)[C@H]1CN([C@@H]2CC3=C(NC4=CC=CC(=C34)C2=C1)I)C
- InChI: InChI=1S/C20H24IN3O/c1-4-24(5-2)20(25)12-9-14-13-7-6-8-16-18(13)15(19(21)22-16)10-17(14)23(3)11-12/h6-9,12,17,22H,4-5,10-11H2,1-3H3/t12-,17-/m1/s1; Key:OBCUQRYIGTWROI-SJKOYZFVSA-N

2-Iodo-LSD (IOL) is a putatively non-hallucinogenic serotonin receptor modulator of the lysergamide family related to 2-bromo-LSD (BOL-148) and lysergic acid diethylamide (LSD). It is the 2-iodo derivative of LSD.

== Use and effects ==
According to Alexander Shulgin in his 1997 book TiHKAL (Tryptamines I Have Known and Loved), it is unknown whether 2-iodo-LSD has ever been tested in humans.

== Pharmacology ==
=== Pharmacodynamics ===
2-Iodo-LSD shows high affinity for the serotonin 5-HT_{2} receptors and also shows affinity for other serotonin receptors as well as for the dopamine and adrenergic receptors. In contrast to LSD, but similarly to 2-bromo-LSD, 2-iodo-LSD is predominantly antagonistic at the serotonin 5-HT_{2A} and 5-HT_{2C} receptors and is described as non-hallucinogenic. The drug has about 57.4% of the antiserotonergic activity of LSD in the isolated rat uterus in vitro, whereas 2-bromo-LSD has about 103% of LSD's potency in this assay.

== Radiolabeling ==
[^{125}I]2-Iodo-LSD, a radiolabeled analogue of 2-iodo-LSD, has been used as a radioligand for serotonin 5-HT_{2} receptors. In addition, radiolabeled derivatives of 2-iodo-LSD, such as 1-methyl-2-[^{125}I]iodo-LSD ([^{125}I]-MIL) and 1-ethyl-2-[^{125}I]iodo-LSD ([^{125}I]-EIL), have been developed for use as presumably non-hallucinogenic agents in imaging of serotonin receptors.

== History ==
2-Iodo-LSD was described in the scientific literature by Albert Hofmann and colleagues by 1956.

== See also ==
- Substituted lysergamide
- 2-Bromo-LSD (BOL-148)
- MBL-61 (1-methyl-2-bromo-LSD)
- 2-Oxo-LSD
