= DAM-57 =

Psychedelic drug

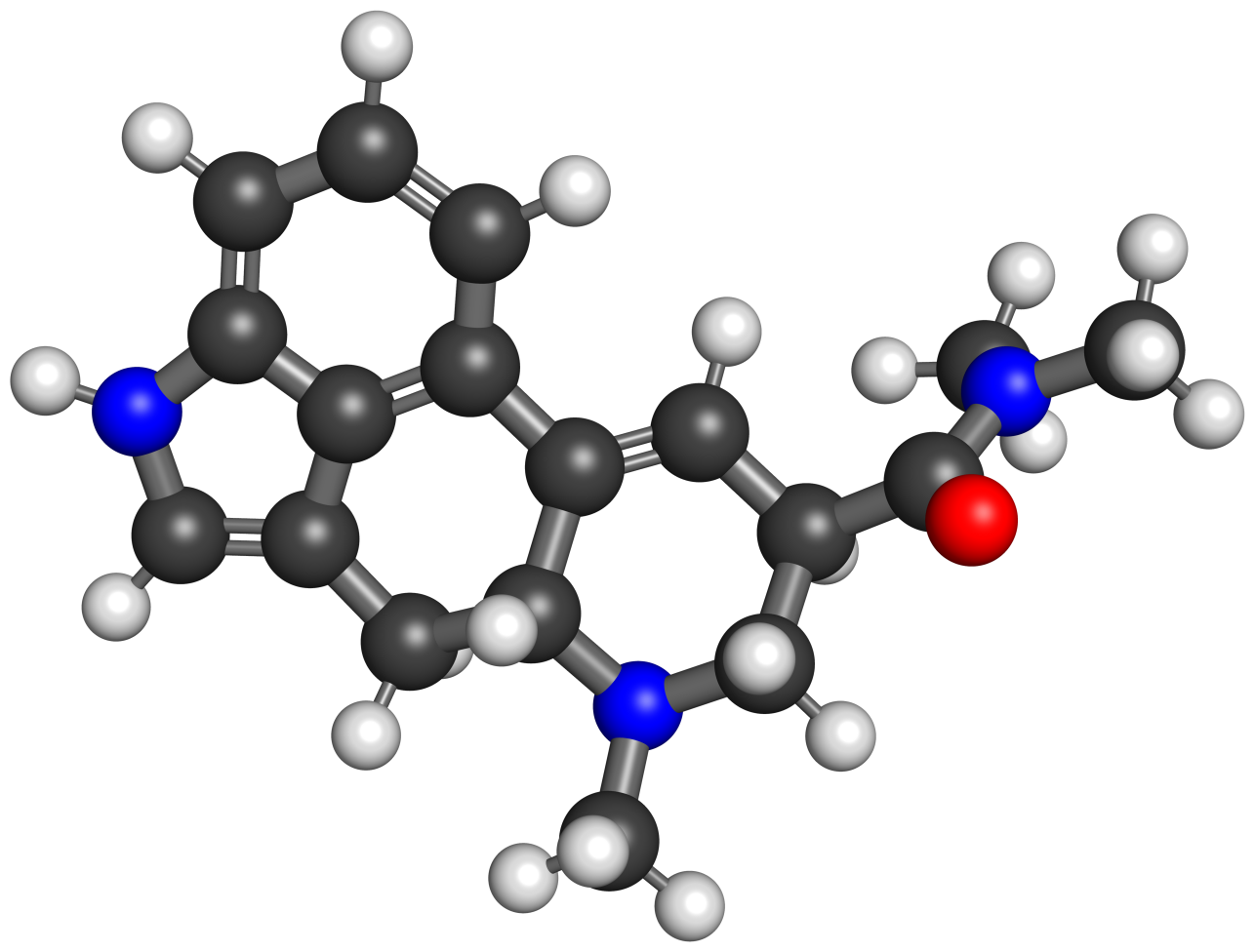

Clinical data
- Other names: DAM-57; N,N-Dimethyllysergamide; DAM; Lysergic acid dimethylamide
- Routes of administration: Oral

Legal status
- Legal status: US: Schedule I Controlled in the United States via the Federal Analog Act but only if it is intended for human consumption.

Identifiers
- IUPAC name: (6aR,9R)-N,N-dimethyl-7-methyl-4,6,6a,7,8,9- hexahydroindolo- [4,3-fg] quinoline- 9-carboxamide
- CAS Number: 4238-84-0
- PubChem CID: 199478
- ChemSpider: 172668
- UNII: LX5MKR2EXX
- CompTox Dashboard (EPA): DTXSID30962445

Chemical and physical data
- Formula: C_{18}H_{21}N_{3}O
- Molar mass: 295.386 g·mol^{−1}
- 3D model (JSmol): Interactive image
- SMILES: O=C(N(C)C)[C@@H]3C=C2c4cccc1c4c(c[nH]1)C[C@H]2N(C3)C
- InChI: InChI=1S/C18H21N3O/c1-20(2)18(22)12-7-14-13-5-4-6-15-17(13)11(9-19-15)8-16(14)21(3)10-12/h4-7,9,12,16,19H,8,10H2,1-3H3/t12-,16-/m1/s1; Key:FWHSERNVTGTIJE-MLGOLLRUSA-N

DAM-57, also known as N,N-dimethyllysergamide (DAM) or as lysergic acid dimethylamide, is a derivative of ergine. There has been a single report of observing N,N-dimethyl-D-lysergamide in the illicit drug market. This compound did induce autonomic disturbances at oral levels of some 10 times the dose required for lysergic acid diethylamide (LSD), presumably in the high hundreds of micrograms. There is some disagreement as to whether there were psychic changes observed. It was first described in the scientific literature by Albert Hofmann and colleagues by 1955.

== See also ==
- Substituted lysergamide
- Lysergic acid methylamide (LAM)
- Lysergic acid dipropylamide (DPL)
- Lysergic acid diallylamide (DAL)
