= Bromerguride =

Medication

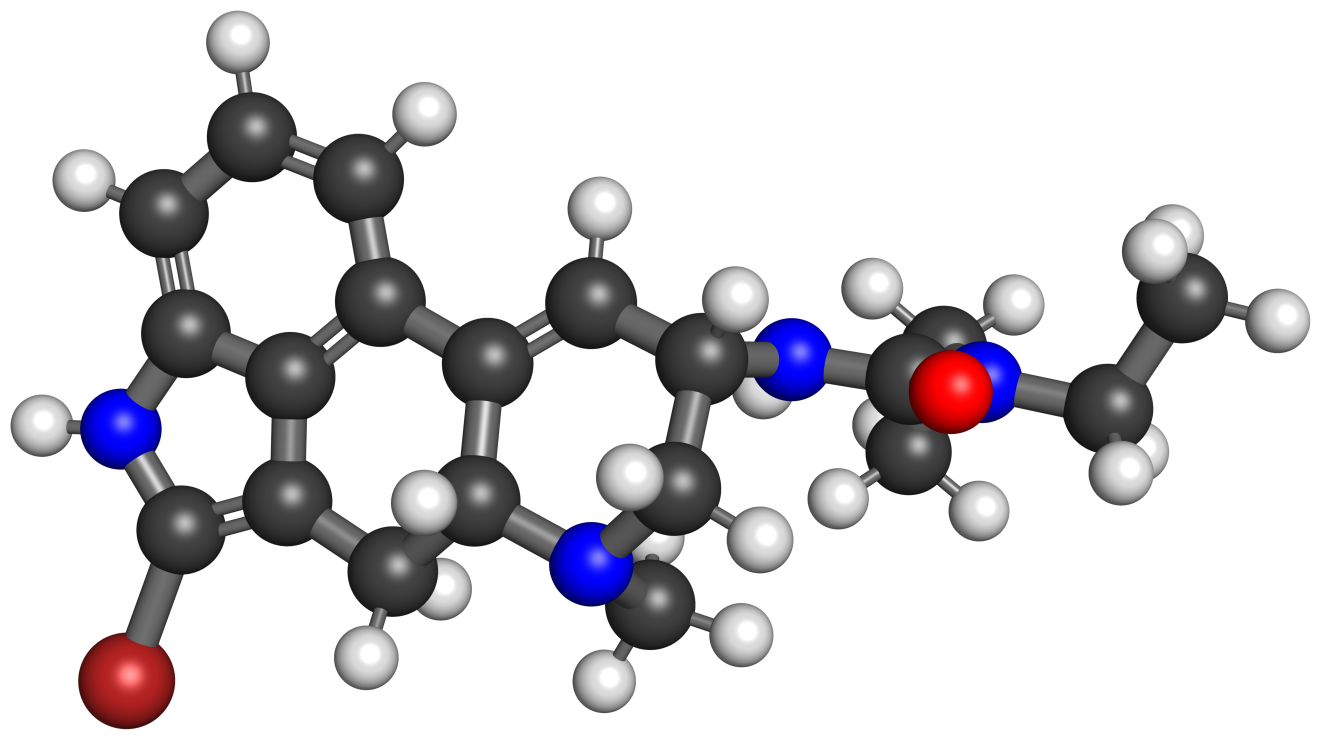

Clinical data
- Other names: 2-Bromolisuride; 2-Br-LIS; Βromolisuride; Bromuride; ZK-95451; 3-(2-Βromo-9,10-didehydro-6-methyl-8α-ergolinyl)-1,1-diethylurea

Identifiers
- IUPAC name: 3-[(6aR,9S)-5-bromo-7-methyl-6,6a,8,9-tetrahydro-4H-indolo[4,3-fg]quinolin-9-yl]-1,1-diethylurea
- CAS Number: 83455-48-5
- PubChem CID: 71266
- ChemSpider: 64394
- UNII: HX58M2377W
- ChEMBL: ChEMBL2104211
- CompTox Dashboard (EPA): DTXSID70232356

Chemical and physical data
- Formula: C_{20}H_{25}BrN_{4}O
- Molar mass: 417.351 g·mol^{−1}
- 3D model (JSmol): Interactive image
- SMILES: CCN(CC)C(=O)N[C@@H]1CN([C@@H]2CC3=C(NC4=CC=CC(=C34)C2=C1)Br)C
- InChI: InChI=1S/C20H25BrN4O/c1-4-25(5-2)20(26)22-12-9-14-13-7-6-8-16-18(13)15(19(21)23-16)10-17(14)24(3)11-12/h6-9,12,17,23H,4-5,10-11H2,1-3H3,(H,22,26)/t12-,17+/m0/s1; Key:SBHNNNRQZGYOAU-YVEFUNNKSA-N

Bromerguride (INN), also known as 2-bromolisuride, is an antidopaminergic and serotonergic agent of the ergoline group which was described as having atypical antipsychotic properties but was never marketed. It was the first antidopaminergic ergoline derivative to be discovered. The pharmacodynamic actions of bromerguride are said to be "reversed" relative to its parent compound lisuride, a dopaminergic agent.

== See also ==
- Substituted ergoline
