= MAL-LAD =

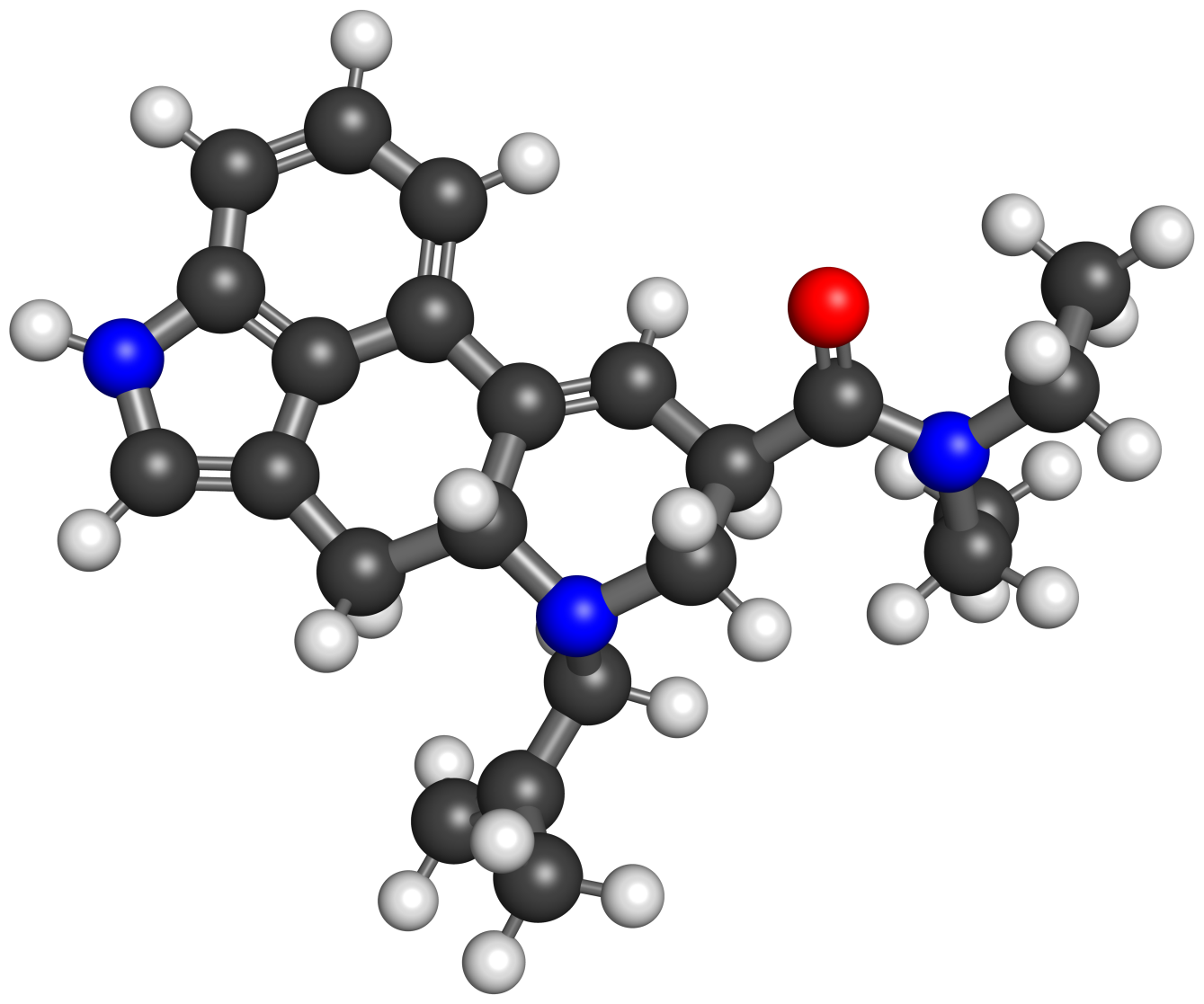

Clinical data
- Other names: MALLAD; METAL-LAD; METALLAD; 6-Methallyl-6-nor-LSD; N,N-Diethyl-6-(2-methylprop-2-en-1-yl)-9,10-didehydroergoline-8β-carboxamide
- Drug class: Serotonin receptor agonist
- ATC code: None

Identifiers
- IUPAC name: (6aR,9R)-N,N-Diethyl-7-(2-methylprop-2-en-1-yl)-4,6,6a,7,8,9-hexahydroindolo[4,3-fg]quinoline-9-carboxamide

Chemical and physical data
- Formula: C_{23}H_{29}N_{3}O
- Molar mass: 363.505 g·mol^{−1}
- 3D model (JSmol): Interactive image
- SMILES: CCN(C(=O)[C@H]1CN(CC(=C)C)[C@H]2C(=C1)c1cccc3c1c(C2)c[nH]3)CC
- InChI: InChI=1S/C23H29N3O/c1-5-25(6-2)23(27)17-10-19-18-8-7-9-20-22(18)16(12-24-20)11-21(19)26(14-17)13-15(3)4/h7-10,12,17,21,24H,3,5-6,11,13-14H2,1-2,4H3/t17-,21-/m1/s1; Key:CMBLBLPHJKCTIR-DYESRHJHSA-N

MAL-LAD, or MALLAD, also known as METAL-LAD or METALLAD, as well as 6-methallyl-6-nor-LSD, is a serotonin receptor modulator of the lysergamide family related to lysergic acid diethylamide (LSD).

The drug acts as a non-selective serotonin receptor agonist, including of the serotonin 5-HT_{2A} receptor among others. It is also a dopamine receptor agonist, though unlike other lysergamides, does not show activity at the dopamine D_{1} and D_{5} receptors. MAL-LAD does not appear to have been assessed in animal tests of psychedelic-like activity such as drug discrimination.

MAL-LAD was first described in the scientific literature by Andrew Joseph Hoffman of the lab of David E. Nichols at Purdue University by 1987. It was subsequently further described by a group of researchers that included Nichols and other colleagues in 2025. The drug is not a controlled substance in Canada as of 2025.

== See also ==
- Substituted lysergamide
- AL-LAD
- IP-LAD
