= MLD-41 =

Chemical compound

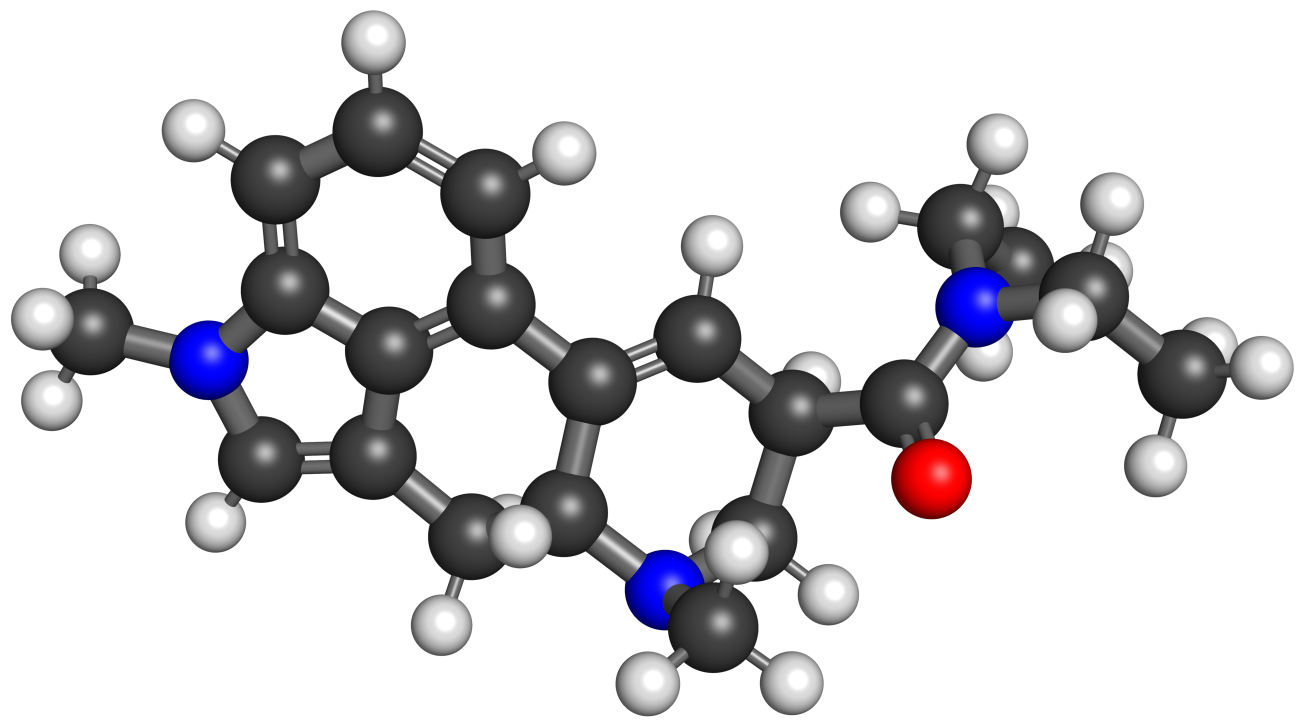

Clinical data
- Other names: MLD-41; MLD; N1-Methyl-Lysergic Acid Diethylamide; 1-Methyl-LSD; 1-Methyl-N,N-Diethyllysergamide; Methyl-LSD
- Routes of administration: Oral
- Drug class: Serotonergic psychedelic; Hallucinogen

Identifiers
- IUPAC name: (8β)-N,N-Diethyl-1,6-dimethyl-9,10-didehydroergoline-8-carboxamide
- CAS Number: 4238-85-1
- PubChem CID: 165200
- ChemSpider: 144824
- CompTox Dashboard (EPA): DTXSID00895034

Chemical and physical data
- Formula: C_{21}H_{27}N_{3}O
- Molar mass: 337.467 g·mol^{−1}
- 3D model (JSmol): Interactive image
- SMILES: O=C(N(CC)CC)[C@@H]3/C=C2/c4cccc1c4c(cn1C)C[C@H]2N(C3)C
- InChI: InChI=1S/C21H27N3O/c1-5-24(6-2)21(25)15-10-17-16-8-7-9-18-20(16)14(12-22(18)3)11-19(17)23(4)13-15/h7-10,12,15,19H,5-6,11,13H2,1-4H3/t15-,19-/m1/s1; Key:VQZYKSWQIQANKB-DNVCBOLYSA-N

MLD-41, also known as 1-methyl-LSD, is a psychedelic drug of the lysergamide family related to lysergic acid diethylamide (LSD). It has about 33% of the psychoactive potency of LSD. It has been studied with regard to cross-tolerance with LSD. Extensive metabolism of other 1-methylated lysergamides to their secondary amine derivatives, for instance methysergide (1-methylmethylergometrine) conversion into methylergometrine, has been observed.

== Pharmacology ==
=== Pharmacodynamics ===
MLD-41 produces the head-twitch response, a behavioral proxy of psychedelic effects, in rodents, and with only slightly lower potency than LSD.

== Society and culture ==
=== Legal status ===
==== Canada ====
MLD-41 is not a controlled substance in Canada as of 2025.

== See also ==
- Substituted lysergamide
- MLA-74 (1-methyl-LAE)
- MPD-75 (1-methyl-LPD)
- MBL-61 (1-methyl-2-bromo-LSD)
