= C21H27N3O =

The molecular formula C_{21}H_{27}N_{3}O (molar mass: 337.47 g/mol) may refer to:

- ETH-LAD
- Ethylpropyllysergamide
- Lysergic acid 2-pentylamide
- Lysergic acid 3-pentylamide
- Lysergic acid amylamide
- N1-Methyl-lysergic acid diethylamide
- 14-Methyl-LSD
