= DiPLA =

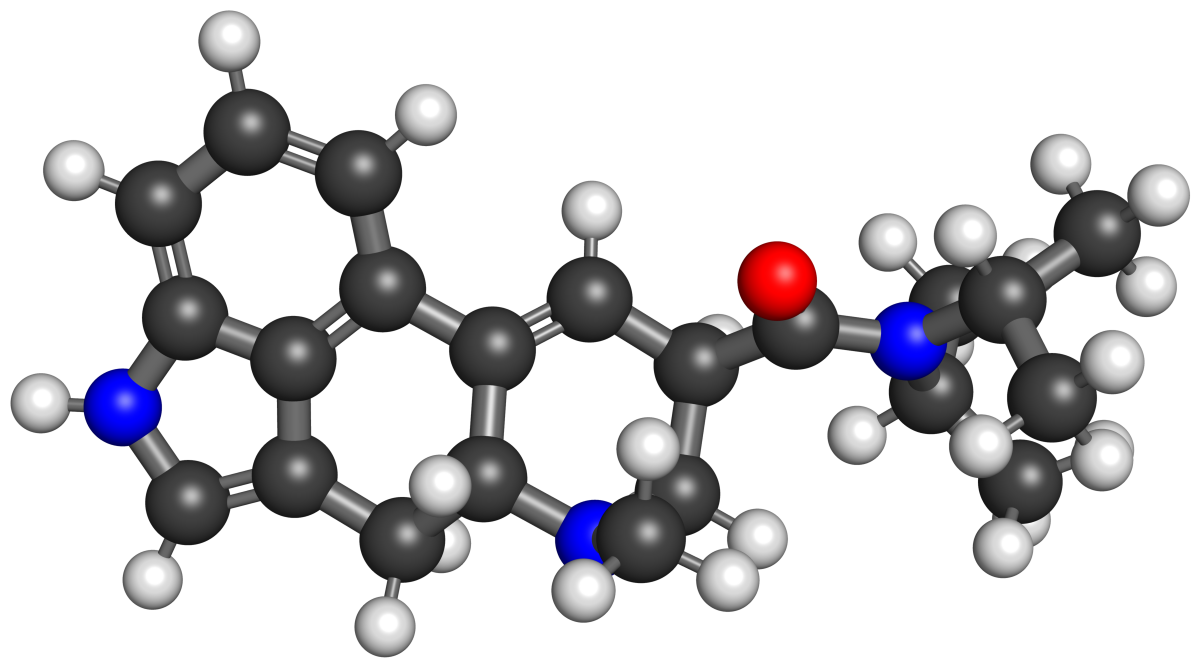

Clinical data
- Other names: DiPLA; N,N-Diisopropyllysergamide; Lysergic acid diisopropylamide
- Drug class: Serotonin receptor modulator; Serotonergic psychedelic; Hallucinogen
- ATC code: None

Identifiers
- IUPAC name: (6aR,9R)-7-methyl-N,N-di(propan-2-yl)-4,6,6a,7,8,9-hexahydroindolo[4,3-fg]quinoline-9-carboxamide
- PubChem CID: 101661198

Chemical and physical data
- Formula: C_{22}H_{29}N_{3}O
- Molar mass: 351.494 g·mol^{−1}
- 3D model (JSmol): Interactive image
- SMILES: CN1C[C@@H](C=C2[C@H]1Cc1c[nH]c3c1c2ccc3)C(=O)N(C(C)C)C(C)C
- InChI: InChI=1S/C22H29N3O/c1-13(2)25(14(3)4)22(26)16-9-18-17-7-6-8-19-21(17)15(11-23-19)10-20(18)24(5)12-16/h6-9,11,13-14,16,20,23H,10,12H2,1-5H3/t16-,20-/m1/s1; Key:UGLFFFFNSMDCNO-OXQOHEQNSA-N

DiPLA, also known as N,N-diisopropyllysergamide or as lysergic acid diisopropylamide, is a putative serotonergic psychedelic of the lysergamide family related to lysergic acid diethylamide (LSD). It is the analogue of LSD in which the N,N-diethyl groups have been replaced with N,N-diisopropyl groups.

== Use and effects ==
DiPLA is not known to have been assessed in humans.

== Pharmacology ==
=== Pharmacodynamics ===
In an early study, DiPLA showed 23.2% of the antiserotonergic activity of LSD in the isolated rat uterus and hence was about 4-fold less potent than LSD in this assay. Subsequently, DIPLA was reported to have an affinity (K_{i}) for the serotonin 5-HT_{2A} receptor of 9.0 to 20.2 nM, which was about 4- to 9-fold lower than that of LSD (K_{i} = 4.8 nM). It is an agonist of the serotonin 5-HT_{2A} receptor and also interacts with other receptors such as the serotonin 5-HT_{1A} receptor, the serotonin 5-HT_{2C} receptor, and dopamine receptors. DIPLA fully substituted for LSD in rodent drug discrimination tests, suggesting that it could have psychedelic effects in humans. Unlike other assessed lysergamides however, DIPLA was much less potent than LSD, about 8-fold so in the drug discrimination test.

== History ==
DiPLA was first described in the scientific literature by Albert Hofmann and colleagues by 1955. Subsequently, it was studied in more detail by David E. Nichols and colleagues in the 1990s and thereafter.

== See also ==
- Substituted lysergamide
- Isopropyllysergamide (IPLA)
- Methylisopropyllysergamide (MIPLA)
- Ethylisopropyllysergamide (EIPLA)
- Lysergic acid dipropylamide
- Lysergic acid dibutylamide (LBB-66)
- Lysergic acid propylamide
