= Lysergic acid amylamide =

Clinical data
- Other names: Lysergic acid pentylamide; N-Pentyllysergamide; N-Amyllysergamide; NPe-LA; 6-Methyl-N-pentyl-9,10-didehydroergoline-8β-carboxamide
- Drug class: Serotonin receptor modulator
- ATC code: None

Identifiers
- IUPAC name: (6aR,9R)-7-methyl-N-pentyl-4,6,6a,7,8,9-hexahydroindolo[4,3-fg]quinoline-9-carboxamide

Chemical and physical data
- Formula: C_{21}H_{27}N_{3}O
- Molar mass: 337.467 g·mol^{−1}
- 3D model (JSmol): Interactive image
- SMILES: CCCCCNC([C@@H](C1)C=C2C3=C4C(C[C@@]2([H])N1C)=CNC4=CC=C3)=O
- InChI: InChI=1S/C21H27N3O/c1-3-4-5-9-22-21(25)15-10-17-16-7-6-8-18-20(16)14(12-23-18)11-19(17)24(2)13-15/h6-8,10,12,15,19,23H,3-5,9,11,13H2,1-2H3,(H,22,25)/t15-,19-/m1/s1; Key:ZWLCMQVCVMIVGG-DNVCBOLYSA-N

Lysergic acid amylamide, also known as lysergic acid pentylamide or as N-pentyllysergamide (NPe-LA), is a serotonin receptor modulator of the lysergamide family related to the psychedelic drug lysergic acid diethylamide (LSD). It is the analogue of LSD in which the N,N-diethyl groups have been replaced with an N-pentyl group (amyl group) and is also the N-pentyl derivative of ergine (lysergic acid amide; LSA). The drug shows 75.1% of the antiserotonergic activity of LSD in the isolated rat uterus in vitro. However, activity in this assay does not correlate with hallucinogenic activity. In addition, unlike LSD and lysergic acid ethylamide (LAE-32), the lower homologue lysergic acid propylamide is known to be inactive as a psychedelic in humans at doses of up to 500 μg orally. Lysergic acid amylamide was first described in the scientific literature by 1958.

== See also ==
- Substituted lysergamide
- Lysergic acid butylamide
- Lysergic acid propylamide
- Lysergic acid ethylamide (LAE-32)
- Lysergic acid methylamide
- Lysergic acid amide (ergine)
- Lysergic acid 2-pentylamide (2-LSP)
- Lysergic acid 3-pentylamide (3-LSP)
