= ETFELA =

Chemical compound

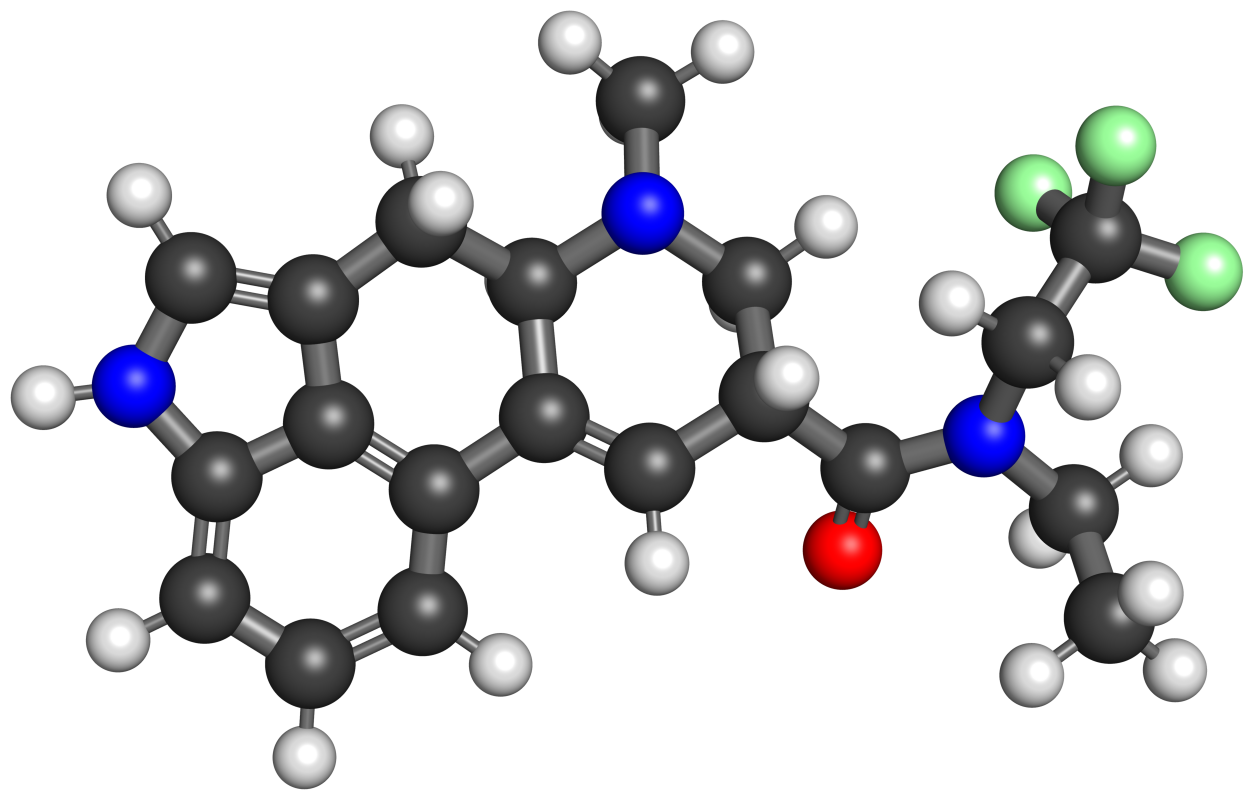

Clinical data
- Other names: TRALA-06; TRALA06; LA-CH_{2}CF_{3}; N-Ethyl-N-(2,2,2-trifluoroethyl)lysergamide
- Drug class: Serotonin receptor modulator

Identifiers
- IUPAC name: (6aR,9R)-N-Ethyl-7-methyl-N-(2,2,2-trifluoroethyl)-4,6,6a,7,8,9-hexahydroindolo[4,3-fg]quinoline-9-carboxamide
- CAS Number: 3024529-99-2
- PubChem CID: 163187757
- CompTox Dashboard (EPA): DTXSID201337080

Chemical and physical data
- Formula: C_{20}H_{22}F_{3}N_{3}O
- Molar mass: 377.411 g·mol^{−1}
- 3D model (JSmol): Interactive image
- SMILES: CCN(C(=O)[C@H]1CN(C)[C@H]2C(=C1)c1cccc3c1c(C2)c[nH]3)CC(F)(F)F
- InChI: InChI=1S/C20H22F3N3O/c1-3-26(11-20(21,22)23)19(27)13-7-15-14-5-4-6-16-18(14)12(9-24-16)8-17(15)25(2)10-13/h4-7,9,13,17,24H,3,8,10-11H2,1-2H3/t13-,17-/m1/s1; Key:VAHPXTJQSWECIC-CXAGYDPISA-N

ETFELA, also known as TRALA-06 or as N-ethyl-N-(2,2,2-trifluoroethyl)lysergamide, is an analogue of lysergic acid diethylamide (LSD) first synthesized by Jason C. Parrish as part of the research team led by David E. Nichols. In studies in vitro, it was found to be slightly more potent than LSD itself.

== Chemistry ==
=== Analogues ===
Analogues of ETFELA include LSD, EcPLA, EiPLA, MiPLA, FLUORETH-LAD (FE-LAD), and FP-LAD, among others.

== See also ==
- Substituted lysergamide
