= Lysergic acid butylamide =

Clinical data
- Other names: LAB; N-Butyllysergamide; NB-LA; N-Butyl-9,10-didehydro-6-methylergoline-8β-carboxamide
- Drug class: Serotonin receptor modulator
- ATC code: None

Identifiers
- IUPAC name: (6aR,9R)-N-butyl-7-methyl-6,6a,8,9-tetrahydro-4H-indolo[4,3-fg]quinoline-9-carboxamide
- CAS Number: 50583-88-5
- PubChem CID: 3039392
- ChemSpider: 2302861

Chemical and physical data
- Formula: C_{20}H_{25}N_{3}O
- Molar mass: 323.440 g·mol^{−1}
- 3D model (JSmol): Interactive image
- SMILES: CCCCNC(=O)[C@H]1CN([C@@H]2CC3=CNC4=CC=CC(=C34)C2=C1)C
- InChI: InChI=1S/C20H25N3O/c1-3-4-8-21-20(24)14-9-16-15-6-5-7-17-19(15)13(11-22-17)10-18(16)23(2)12-14/h5-7,9,11,14,18,22H,3-4,8,10,12H2,1-2H3,(H,21,24)/t14-,18-/m1/s1; Key:PZRGRDXQFPWKCS-RDTXWAMCSA-N

Lysergic acid butylamide, also known as N-butyllysergamide (NB-LA), is a serotonin receptor modulator of the lysergamide family related to the psychedelic drug lysergic acid diethylamide (LSD). It is the analogue of LSD in which the N,N-diethyl groups have been replaced with an N-butyl group and is also the N-butyl derivative of ergine (lysergic acid amide; LSA). The drug shows 64.9% of the antiserotonergic activity of LSD in the isolated rat uterus in vitro. However, activity in this assay does not correlate with hallucinogenic activity. In addition, unlike LSD and lysergic acid ethylamide (LAE-32), the lower homologue lysergic acid propylamide is known to be inactive as a psychedelic in humans at doses of up to 500 μg orally. Lysergic acid butylamide was first described in the scientific literature by 1957.

== See also ==
- Substituted lysergamide
- Lysergic acid amylamide
- Lysergic acid propylamide
- Lysergic acid ethylamide (LAE-32)
- Lysergic acid methylamide
- Lysergic acid amide (ergine)
- Lysergic acid dibutylamide (LBB-66)
- Lysergic acid 2-pentylamide (2-LSP)
