= IPLA =

iPLA

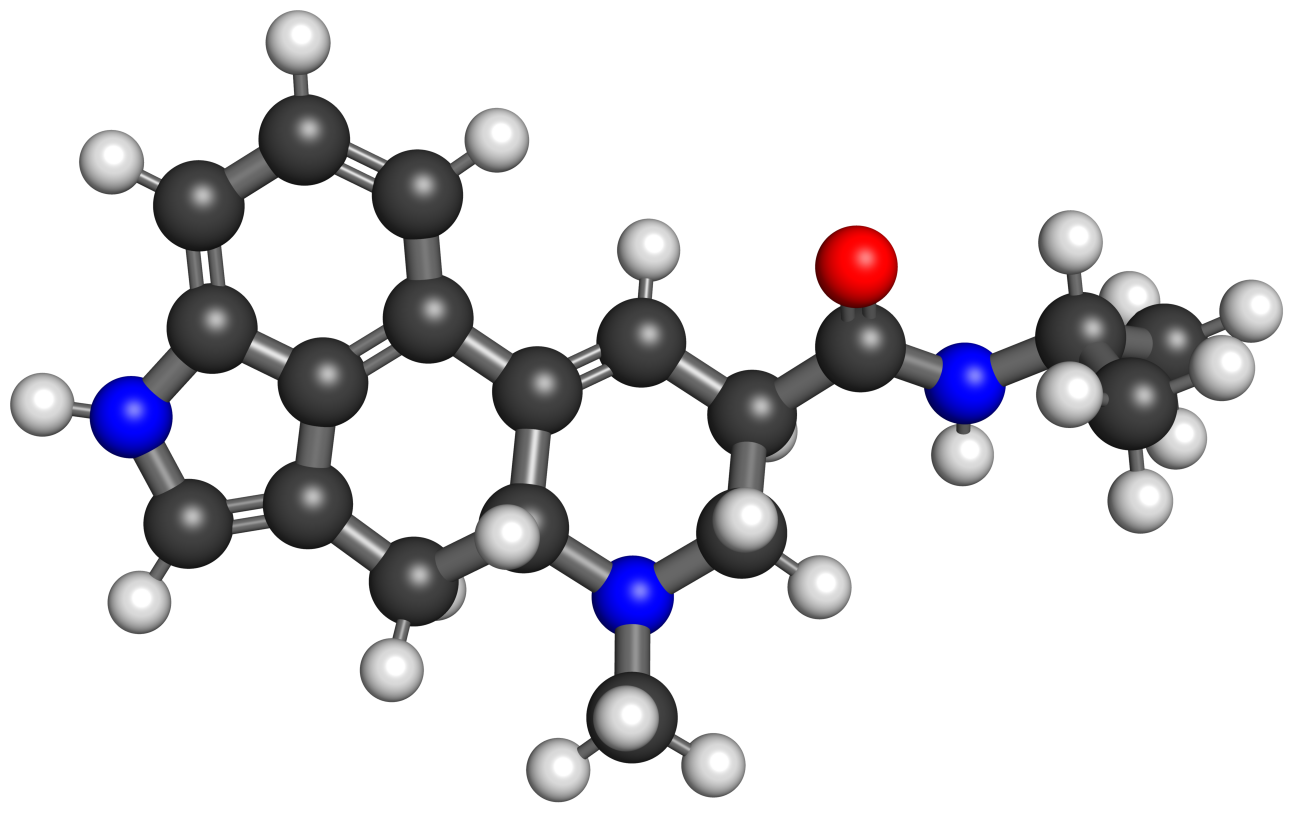

Clinical data
- Other names: IPLA; N-Isopropyllysergamide; Lysergic acid isopropylamide; LAiP
- Drug class: Serotonin receptor modulator; Possible serotonergic psychedelic or hallucinogen
- ATC code: None

Identifiers
- IUPAC name: (6aR,9R)-7-methyl-N-propan-2-yl-6,6a,8,9-tetrahydro-4H-indolo[4,3-fg]quinoline-9-carboxamide
- PubChem CID: 5282400
- ChemSpider: 4445555

Chemical and physical data
- Formula: C_{19}H_{23}N_{3}O
- Molar mass: 309.413 g·mol^{−1}
- 3D model (JSmol): Interactive image
- SMILES: CC(C)NC(=O)[C@H]1CN([C@@H]2CC3=CNC4=CC=CC(=C34)C2=C1)C
- InChI: InChI=1S/C19H23N3O/c1-11(2)21-19(23)13-7-15-14-5-4-6-16-18(14)12(9-20-16)8-17(15)22(3)10-13/h4-7,9,11,13,17,20H,8,10H2,1-3H3,(H,21,23)/t13-,17-/m1/s1; Key:XSQDFRPRMRYUHM-CXAGYDPISA-N

iPLA, also known as N-isopropyllysergamide, as well as lysergic acid isopropylamide (LAiP), is a serotonin receptor modulator and possible serotonergic psychedelic of the lysergamide family related to lysergic acid diethylamide (LSD). It is the analogue of LSD in which the N,N-diethyl groups have been replaced with an N-isopropyl group.

In an early study, iPLA showed about 22.2% of the antiserotonergic activity of LSD in the isolated rat uterus. The drug is known to bind with high affinity (K_{i}) to the serotonin 5-HT_{2A}, 5-HT_{2C}, and 5-HT_{1A} receptors. It is a potent agonist of the serotonin 5-HT_{2A} receptor. iPLA fully substituted for LSD in rodent drug discrimination tests with a potency of about half that of LSD itself, findings which suggest that iPLA may have psychedelic effects in humans.

iPLA was first described in the scientific literature by Albert Hofmann and colleagues by 1955. Subsequently, it was studied in more detail by David E. Nichols and colleagues in the 1990s. It is not a controlled substance in Canada as of 2025.

== See also ==
- Substituted lysergamide
- Lysergic acid propylamide
- MiPLA (lysergic acid methylisopropylamide)
- EiPLA (lysergic acid ethylisopropylamide)
- DiPLA (lysergic acid diisopropylamide)
- Lysergic acid tert-butylamide (LAtB)
