= LME-54 =

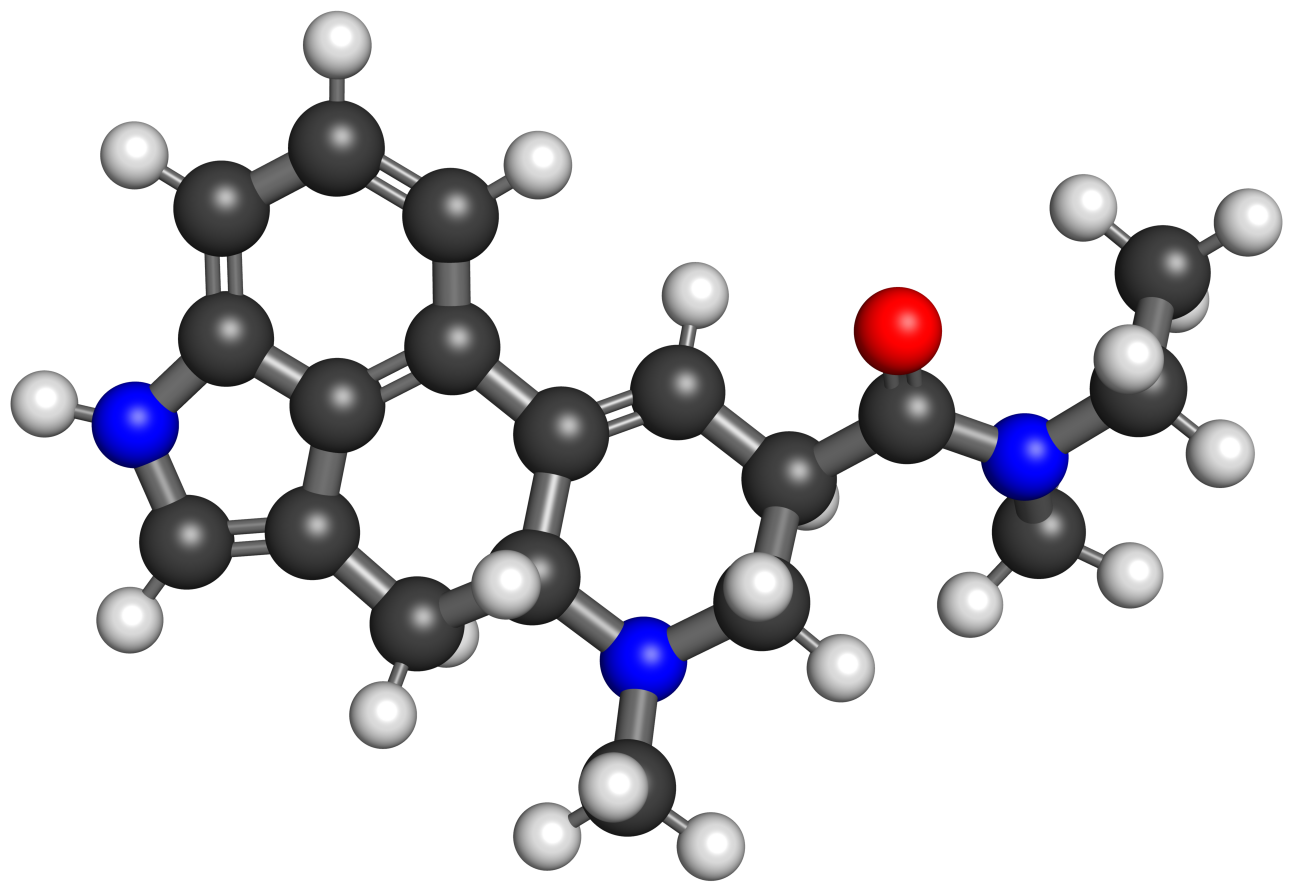

Clinical data
- Other names: LME54; LME; Lysergic acid methylethylamide; LA-methylethylamide; N-Ethyl-N-methyllysergamide; N-Ethyl-N,6-dimethyl-9,10-didehydroergoline-8β-carboxamide
- Routes of administration: Oral
- Drug class: Serotonergic psychedelic; Hallucinogen
- ATC code: None

Identifiers
- IUPAC name: (6aR,9R)-N-ethyl-N,7-dimethyl-6,6a,8,9-tetrahydro-4H-indolo[4,3-fg]quinoline-9-carboxamide
- PubChem CID: 164763851

Chemical and physical data
- Formula: C_{19}H_{23}N_{3}O
- Molar mass: 309.413 g·mol^{−1}
- 3D model (JSmol): Interactive image
- SMILES: CCN(C)C(=O)[C@H]1CN([C@@H]2CC3=CNC4=CC=CC(=C34)C2=C1)C
- InChI: InChI=1S/C19H23N3O/c1-4-21(2)19(23)13-8-15-14-6-5-7-16-18(14)12(10-20-16)9-17(15)22(3)11-13/h5-8,10,13,17,20H,4,9,11H2,1-3H3/t13-,17-/m1/s1; Key:BROWGWCWLHAXPI-CXAGYDPISA-N

LME-54, or simply LME, also known as lysergic acid methylethylamide or as N-methyl-N-ethyllysergamide, is a serotonergic psychedelic of the lysergamide family related to lysergic acid diethylamide (LSD; LSD-25). It is the analogue of LSD in which one of the N-ethyl groups has been replaced with an N-methyl group.

The drug was tested in humans at a dose of 25 μg and was found to produce no effects at this dose in several subjects and to produce weaker effects than a 25 μg dose of LSD in one subject. Higher doses do not appear to have been assessed. Based on these findings, LME-54 has been described as weakly active or active but less so than LSD with no specific numbers available. Its antiserotonergic activity in vitro does not appear to have been reported.

LME-54 was first described in the scientific literature by Harold Alexander Abramson and Andre Rolo by 1965. It is not a controlled substance in Canada as of 2025.

== See also ==
- Substituted lysergamide
- Lysergic acid methylpropylamide (LMP-55)
- lysergic acid ethylpropylamide (LEP-57)
- Lysergic acid ethylamide (LAE-32)
