= Methylene shuffle =

Example of the methylene shuffle: LSD and MiPLA
LSD

MiPLA

The methylene shuffle is a strategy in medicinal chemistry used to modify the hydrophobicity of a compound. It involves shortening one alkyl chain by one carbon unit and lengthening another alkyl chain by one carbon unit.

An example of the methylene shuffle is the structural modification of the psychedelic drug lysergic acid diethylamide (LSD), which has N,N-diethyl groups, into methylisopropyllysergamide (MiPLA), which has N-methyl and N-isopropyl groups.
