= 1cP-MiPLA =

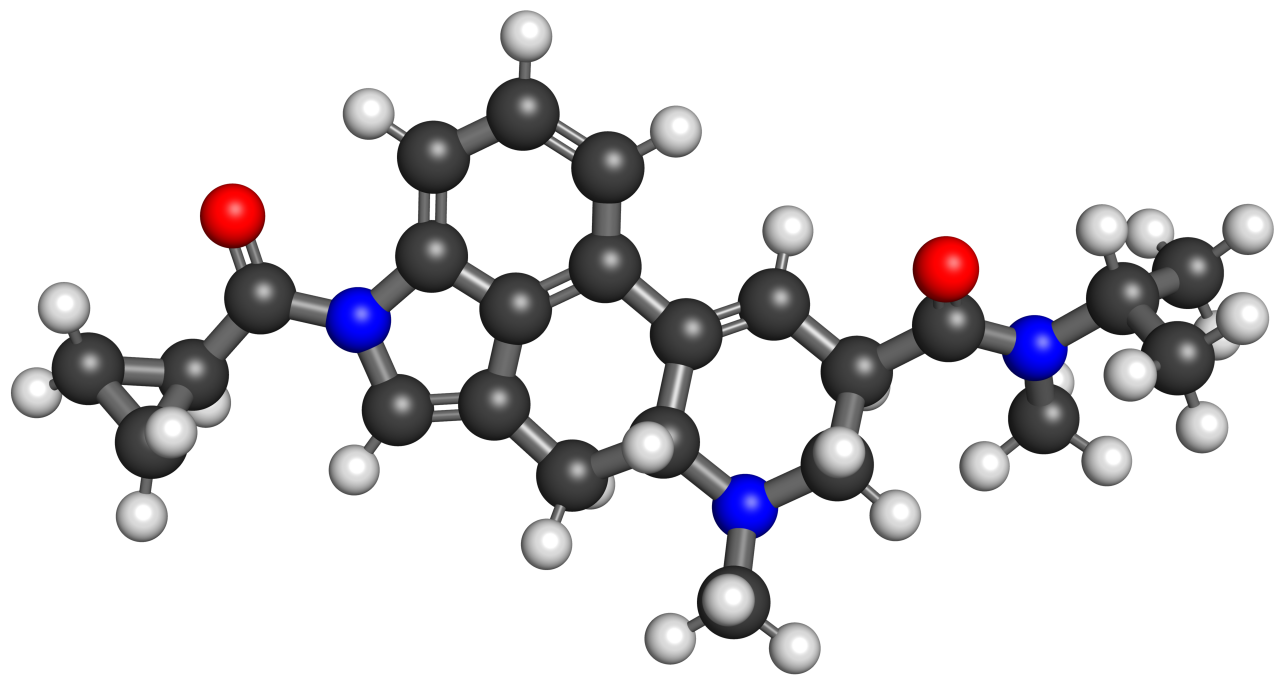

Clinical data
- Other names: 1cP-MIPLA; 1-Cyclopropanoyl-MiPLA; 1-Cyclopropanoyl-N-methyl-N-isopropyllysergamide; 1-(Cyclopropanecarbonyl)-N,6-dimethyl-N-(propan-2-yl)-9,10-didehydroergoline-8β-carboxamide
- Routes of administration: Oral
- Drug class: Serotonin receptor modulator; Serotonin 5-HT_{2A} receptor agonist; Serotonergic psychedelic; Hallucinogen
- ATC code: None

Identifiers
- IUPAC name: (6aR,9R)-4-(cyclopropanecarbonyl)-N,7-dimethyl-N-(propan-2-yl)-4,6,6a,7,8,9-hexahydroindolo[4,3-fg]quinoline-9-carboxamide
- CAS Number: 3028950-74-2
- PubChem CID: 170763684
- ChemSpider: 128938072

Chemical and physical data
- Formula: C_{24}H_{29}N_{3}O_{2}
- Molar mass: 391.515 g·mol^{−1}
- 3D model (JSmol): Interactive image
- SMILES: CN1C[C@@H](C=C2[C@H]1Cc1cn(c3c1c2ccc3)C(=O)C1CC1)C(=O)N(C(C)C)C
- InChI: InChI=1S/C24H29N3O2/c1-14(2)26(4)23(28)17-10-19-18-6-5-7-20-22(18)16(11-21(19)25(3)12-17)13-27(20)24(29)15-8-9-15/h5-7,10,13-15,17,21H,8-9,11-12H2,1-4H3/t17-,21-/m1/s1; Key:DBIYDHUGEKMIHZ-DYESRHJHSA-N

1cP-MiPLA, also known as 1-cyclopropanoyl-MiPLA or 1-cyclopropanoyl-N-methyl-N-isopropyllysergamide, is a presumed psychedelic drug of the lysergamide family. It is the 1-cyclopropanoyl derivative of MiPLA (N-methyl-N-isopropyllysergamide) and is thought to be a prodrug of MiPLA. 1cP-MiPLA has been encountered as a novel designer drug online and in Japan.

== Use and effects ==
1cP-MiPLA has been sold in the form of blotter tabs containing doses of 200 μg per tab. Data on the effects of 1cP-MiPLA at different doses are not available.

== Pharmacology ==
1cP-MiPLA is assumed to act as a prodrug of MiPLA via deacylation. Relatedly, it is assumed to act as a serotonin receptor agonist, including of the serotonin 5-HT_{2A} receptor, and to be a serotonergic psychedelic.

== Chemistry ==
=== Analogues ===
Analogues of 1cP-MiPLA include MiPLA, 1P-MiPLA, and 1cP-AL-LAD, among others.

== History ==
1cP-MiPLA was first encountered as a novel designer drug online in 2020 and in Japan by 2022.

== Society and culture ==
=== Legal status ===
==== Canada ====
1cP-MiPLA is not a controlled substance in Canada as of 2025.

==== Russia ====
1cP-MiPLA is a schedule I controlled substance in Russia.

==== United States ====
1cP-MiPLA is not an explicitly controlled substance in the United States. However, it could be considered a controlled substance under the Federal Analogue Act if intended for human consumption.

== See also ==
- Substituted lysergamide
- Lizard Labs
