= Lysergic acid propylamide =

Clinical data
- Other names: LAP; Lysergic acid monopropylamide; NP-LA; N-Propyllysergamide; N-Propylergine; N-Propyl-LSA; 6-Methyl-N-propyl-9,10-didehydroergoline-8β-carboxamide
- Drug class: Serotonin receptor modulator
- ATC code: None

Identifiers
- IUPAC name: (6aR,9R)-7-methyl-N-propyl-4,6,6a,7,8,9-hexahydroindolo[4,3-fg]quinoline-9-carboxamide
- PubChem CID: 86217901

Chemical and physical data
- Formula: C_{19}H_{23}N_{3}O
- Molar mass: 309.413 g·mol^{−1}
- 3D model (JSmol): Interactive image
- SMILES: CCCNC(=O)[C@H]1CN(C)[C@H]2C(=C1)c1cccc3c1c(C2)c[nH]3
- InChI: InChI=1S/C19H23N3O/c1-3-7-20-19(23)13-8-15-14-5-4-6-16-18(14)12(10-21-16)9-17(15)22(2)11-13/h4-6,8,10,13,17,21H,3,7,9,11H2,1-2H3,(H,20,23)/t13-,17-/m1/s1; Key:VHECNRXVHIGFCO-CXAGYDPISA-N

Lysergic acid propylamide (LAP), also known as N-propyllysergamide (NP-LA), is a serotonin receptor modulator of the lysergamide family related to the psychedelic drug lysergic acid diethylamide (LSD). It is the analogue of LSD in which the N,N-diethyl groups have been replaced with an N-propyl group and is also the N-propyl derivative of ergine (lysergic acid amide; LSA).

== Use and effects ==
It was initially reported that LAP was inactive as a hallucinogen in humans but produced autonomic effects at relatively low doses in both animals and humans, with no other details, such as doses, provided. Subsequently, Alexander Shulgin reported that LAP was inactive at a psychedelic at doses of up to 500 μg and had at least less than 20% of the hallucinogenic potency of LSD.

== Pharmacology ==
The drug had about 40% of the antiserotonergic activity of LSD in the isolated rat uterus in vitro. The potency of LSD analogues in this assay increased with length or size of the monoalkyl chain: ergine (4.3%) < lysergic acid methylamide (6.3%) < lysergic acid ethylamide (11.9%) < lysergic acid isopropylamide (22.2%) < LAP (40.0%) < lysergic acid butylamide (64.9%) < lysergic acid amylamide (75.1%). However, activity in this assay does not correlate with hallucinogenic activity.

== History ==
LAP was first described in the scientific literature by Albert Hofmann and colleagues by 1955.

== See also ==
- Substituted lysergamide
- Lysergic acid methylamide (LAM)
- Lysergic acid ethylamide (LAE-32 or LAE)
- Lysergic acid butylamide (LAB)
- Lysergic acid amylamide
- Lysergic acid dipropylamide (LSDP)
