= MiPLA =

Chemical compound

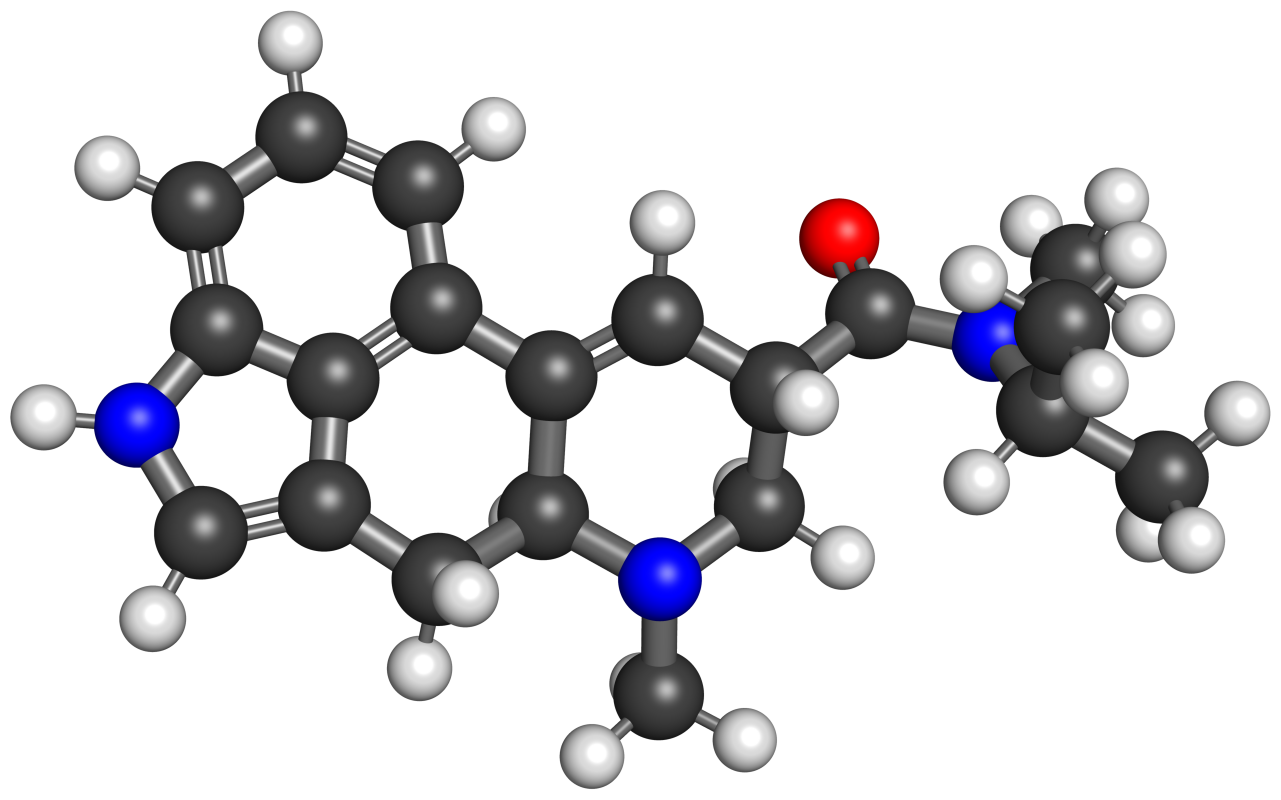

Clinical data
- Other names: MiPLA; MIPLA; Lysergic acid methylisopropylamide; N-Methyl-N-isopropyllysergamide; LAMIDE; LA-Me/iso
- Routes of administration: Oral
- Drug class: Serotonin receptor modulator; 5-HT_{2A} receptor agonist; Serotonergic psychedelic; Hallucinogen
- ATC code: None

Legal status
- Legal status: DE: NpSG (Industrial and scientific use only); UK: Under Psychoactive Substances Act; US: Schedule I (isomer of LSD); Illegal in France

Pharmacokinetic data
- Onset of action: 20–40 minutes
- Duration of action: 4–6 hours

Identifiers
- IUPAC name: (8β)-N-Isopropyl-N,6-dimethyl-9,10-didehydroergoline-8-carboxamide
- CAS Number: 100768-08-9
- PubChem CID: 57507938
- ChemSpider: 128916995
- UNII: AC6WQQ5Y4B

Chemical and physical data
- Formula: C_{20}H_{25}N_{3}O
- Molar mass: 323.440 g·mol^{−1}
- 3D model (JSmol): Interactive image
- SMILES: C4N(C)C1Cc2c[nH]c(ccc3)c2c3C1=CC4C(=O)N(C)C(C)C
- InChI: InChI=1S/C20H25N3O/c1-12(2)23(4)20(24)14-8-16-15-6-5-7-17-19(15)13(10-21-17)9-18(16)22(3)11-14/h5-8,10,12,14,18,21H,9,11H2,1-4H3; Key:ROICYBLUWUMJFF-UHFFFAOYSA-N

MiPLA, also known as N-methyl-N-isopropyllysergamide or as lysergic acid methylisopropylamide, is a psychedelic drug of the lysergamide family related to lysergic acid diethylamide (LSD). It is taken orally. The drug is a structural isomer of LSD in which the N,N-diethyl groups have been replaced with N-methyl and N-isopropyl groups. It is only somewhat less potent than LSD as a psychedelic. MiPLA has been encountered as a novel designer drug.

== Use and effects ==
MiPLA has about 33% to 50% of the potency of LSD in producing psychedelic effects in humans. According to Alexander Shulgin, it produced LSD-like effects at a dose of 180 to 300 μg orally, compared to a dose range of 60 to 200 μg in the case of LSD. Elsewhere, the following has been described about the properties and effects of MiPLA:

"The primary route of administration for MiPLA is orally. Users report that, despite its lower potency, the hallucinogenic effects of MiPLA are very similar to those of LSD. Users typically describe it as "...soft LSD..." However, some reports indicate that the after-effects are harsh and negative. Active doses range from 50 to 300 mcg, depending on the desired effects. Effects occur within 20 to 40 minutes and last for 4 to 6 hours. It is sold recreationally as blotters or powder."

MiPLA and its homologue EiPLA are the only known simple N,N-dialkyllysergamides that approach the potency of LSD itself. All other N,N-dialkyl analogues tested, including the dimethyl, dipropyl, methylethyl, and so on, are only around one-tenth as potent as LSD. However, some N-monoalkyllysergamides, such as the sec-butyl and tert-butyl derivatives, were also found to show activity and potency comparable to LSD. In addition, iPLA, the N-monoisopropyl derivative, is only slightly weaker than MiPLA.

== Pharmacology ==
=== Pharmacodynamics ===
MiPLA has been found to interact with serotonin receptors, including acting as an agonist of the serotonin 5-HT_{2A} receptor. It also interacts with the dopamine D_{1} and D_{2} receptors. The drug fully substitutes for LSD in rodent drug discrimination tests with only slightly lower potency than LSD. In addition, MiPLA produces the head-twitch response, a behavioral proxy of psychedelic effects, in rodents, with about one-third the potency of LSD. The drug showed roughly the same potency in producing the head-twitch response as EcPLA.

== Chemistry ==
MiPLA, also known as N-methyl-N-isopropyllysergamide or as lysergic acid methylisopropylamide, is a substituted lysergamide and a structural isomer of lysergic acid diethylamide (LSD; N,N-diethyllysergamide), with the alkyl groups on the amide nitrogen having been subjected to a methylene shuffle.

=== Synthesis ===
The chemical synthesis of MiPLA has been described.

=== Analogues ===
Analogues of MiPLA include iPLA, EiPLA, EPLA, EcPLA, DiPLA, LSB, and LSP, among others. The ester derivatives 1P-MiPLA and 1cP-MiPLA are thought to be prodrugs of MiPLA.

== History ==
MiPLA was originally discovered and described by Albert Hofmann at Sandoz during the original structure–activity research into LSD, with Eli Lilly and Company filing a patent in 1956 and it being published in 1961. It was subsequently investigated in more detail by the team led by David E. Nichols at Purdue University in the 1990s. The main use for this drug has been in studies of the binding site at the serotonin 5-HT_{2A} receptor through which LSD produces its hallucinogenic effects. MiPLA was first encountered as a novel designer drug by 2018.

== Society and culture ==
=== Legal status ===
==== Austria ====
MiPLA is technically not illegal in Austria but it may fall in the NPSG (Neue-Psychoaktive-Substanzen-Gesetz Österreich) as an analogue of LSD.

==== Canada ====
MiPLA is not a controlled substance in Canada as of 2025.

==== France ====
MiPLA is illegal in France.

==== Germany ====
MiPLA is controlled in Germany under the NpSG (New Psychoactive Substances Act) as of July 18, 2019. Production and import with the aim to place it on the market, administration to another person and trading is punishable. Possession is illegal but not penalized.

==== Switzerland ====
MiPLA can be considered a controlled substance in Switzerland as a defined derivative of Lysergic Acid under Verzeichnis E point 263. It is legal when used for scientific or industrial use.

==== United Kingdom ====
MiPLA is a controlled substance in the United Kingdom via the Psychoactive Substances Act 2016.

==== United States ====
MiPLA is not scheduled in the United States, but may be considered to be an analogue of LSD, which would make it illegal to possess for human consumption under the Federal Analogue Act. However, it may be a Schedule I controlled substance in the United States due to being an isomer of LSD.

== See also ==
- Substituted lysergamide
- Lizard Labs
