= EcPLA =

Chemical compound

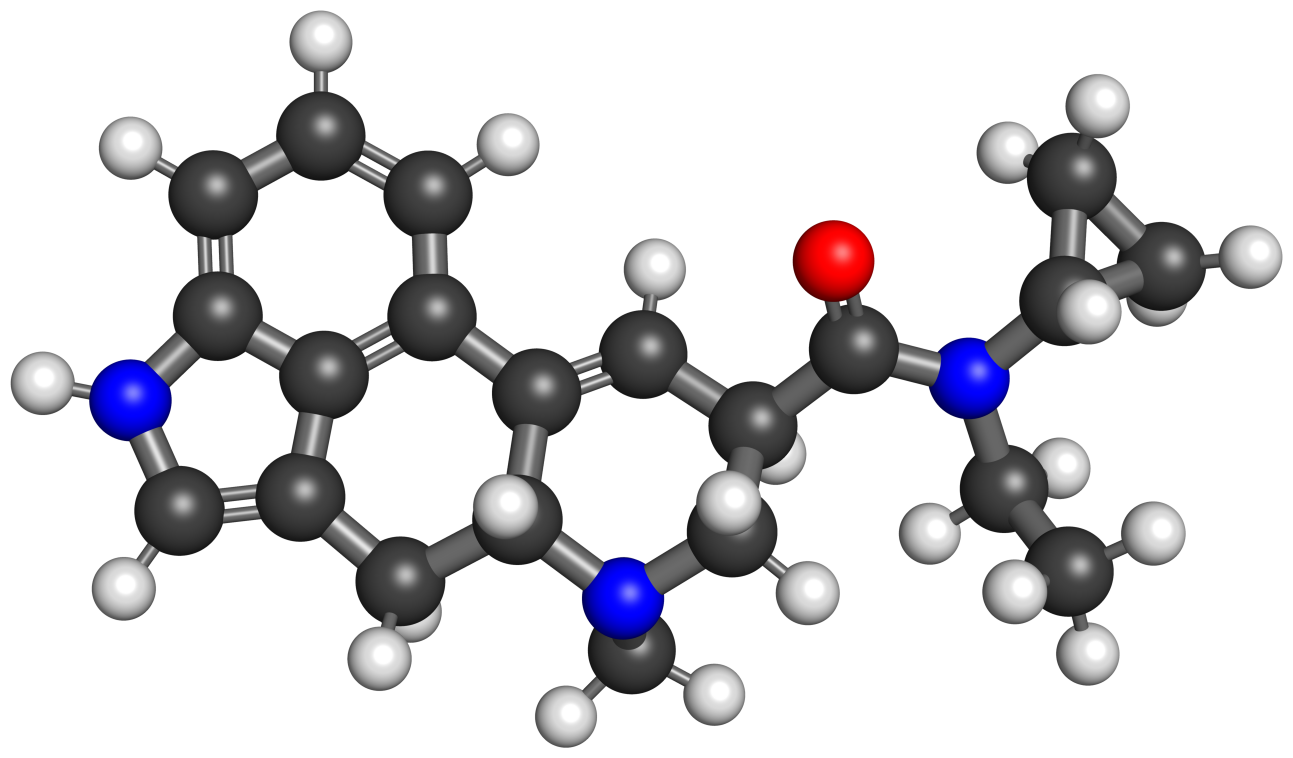

Clinical data
- Other names: ECYPLA; N-Ethyl-N-cyclopropyllysergamide; Lysergic acid ethylcyclopropylamide; LAEcP
- Routes of administration: Oral
- Drug class: Serotonin receptor modulator; Serotonin 5-HT_{2A} receptor agonist; Serotonergic psychedelic; Hallucinogen

Legal status
- Legal status: DE: NpSG (Industrial and scientific use only); UK: Under Psychoactive Substances Act; Illegal in France

Identifiers
- IUPAC name: (6aR,9R)-N-cyclopropyl-N-ethyl-7-methyl-4,6,6a,7,8,9-hexahydroindolo[4,3-fg]quinoline-9-carboxamide
- CAS Number: 2349367-50-4
- PubChem CID: 163184957
- ChemSpider: 129395457

Chemical and physical data
- Formula: C_{21}H_{25}N_{3}O
- Molar mass: 335.451 g·mol^{−1}
- 3D model (JSmol): Interactive image
- SMILES: CCN(C1CC1)C(=O)[C@@H]3C=C2c4cccc5ncc(C[C@H]2N(C)C3)c45
- InChI: InChI=1S/C21H25N3O/c1-3-24(15-7-8-15)21(25)14-9-17-16-5-4-6-18-20(16)13(11-22-18)10-19(17)23(2)12-14/h4-6,9,11,14-15,19,22H,3,7-8,10,12H2,1-2H3/t14-,19-/m1/s1; Key:UNUJKEQFYPYXBK-AUUYWEPGSA-N

EcPLA, also known as N-ethyl-N-cyclopropyllysergamide or as lysergic acid ethylcyclopropylamide (LAEcP), is a psychedelic drug of the lysergamide family related to lysergic acid diethylamide (LSD). It is an isomer of LSZ and is closely related to other amide-substituted lysergamides like MiPLA. The drug has been encountered as a novel designer drug.

== Use and effects ==
EcPLA produces psychedelic effects in humans.

== Pharmacology ==
=== Pharmacodynamics ===
EcPLA has been found to interact with serotonin receptors and dopamine receptors, among other targets. It is a high potency agonist of the serotonin receptors, with its highest binding affinities at the 5-HT_{1A} (K_{i} = 3.2 nM), 5-HT_{2B} (K_{i} = 5.3 nM), and 5-HT_{5A} (K_{i} = 8.6 nM) subtypes. Its 5-HT_{2A} affinity is equivalent to that of LSD, while the affinity to 5-HT_{2C} receptors is 3 times lower than LSD. It shares much of its binding profile with LSD, but does not bind to β1 or β2 adrenergic receptors as LSD does.

The drug produces the head-twitch response, a behavioral proxy of psychedelic effects, in rodents. It has about 40% of the potency of LSD in this regard.

=== Pharmacokinetics ===
The in-vitro metabolism of EcPLA has been studied.

== Chemistry ==
=== Analogues ===
Analogues of EcPLA include MiPLA, LAMPA (MPLA), EPLA, EiPLA, ETFELA, and LSZ, among others.

== History ==
EcPLA was first described in the scientific literature by a team that included Adam Halberstadt, Alexander Stratford, Jason Wallach, and David E. Nichols in 2019. It was developed by Lizard Labs. The drug was encountered online as a novel designer drug in around 2020 and became more widely available in early 2022.

== See also ==
- Substituted lysergamide
- Lizard Labs
