= Molecular modification =

Chemical drug alteration process

Molecular modification is chemical alteration of a known and previously characterized lead compound for the purpose of enhancing its usefulness as a drug. This could mean enhancing its specificity for a particular body target site, increasing its potency, improving its rate and extent of absorption, modifying to advantage its time course in the body, reducing its toxicity, changing its physical or chemical properties (like solubility) to provide desired features.

== Modification for water solubility ==
Molecular modification is used to enhance drug's water solubility by incorporating water solubilizing groups in its structure. The discussion of the introduction of water solubilizing groups into the structure of a lead compound can be conveniently broken down into four general areas:

- The type of group introduced;
- Whether the introduction is reversible or irreversible;
- The position of incorporation; and
- The chemical route of introduction.

=== The type of group ===
The incorporation of polar functional groups, such as the alcohol, amine, amide, carboxylic acid, sulfonic acid and phosphate groups, which either ionize or are capable of relatively strong intermolecular forces of attraction with water (hydrogen bonding), will usually result in analogues with an increased water solubility. Acidic and basic groups are particularly useful, since these groups can be used to form salts, which would give a wider range of dosage forms for the final product. However, the formation of zwitterions by the introduction of either an acid group into a structure containing a base or a base group into a structure containing an acid group can reduce water solubility. Introduction of weakly polar groups, such as carboxylic acid esters, aryl halides and alkyl halides, will not significantly improve water solubility and can result in enhanced lipid solubility.

The incorporation of acidic residues into a lead structure is less likely to change the type of activity, but it can result in the analogue exhibiting haemolytic properties. Furthermore, the introduction of an aromatic acid group usually results in anti-inflammatory activity, whilst carboxylic acids with an alpha functional group may act as chelating agents. Basic water solubilizing groups have a tendency to change the mode of action, since bases often interfere with neurotransmitters and biological processes involving amines. However, their incorporation does mean that the analogue can be formulated as a wide variety of acid salts. Non-ionizable groups do not have the disadvantages of acidic and basic groups.

=== Reversibly and irreversibly attached groups ===
The type of group selected also depends on the degree of permanency required. Groups that are bound directly to the carbon skeleton of the lead compound by less reactive C–C, C–O and C–N bonds are likely to be irreversibly attached to the lead structure.

Groups that are linked to the lead by ester, amide, phosphate, sulfate and glycosidic bonds are more likely to be metabolized from the resulting analogue to reform the parent lead compound as the analogue is transferred from its point of administration to its site of action. Compounds with this type of solubilizing group are acting as prodrugs and so their activity is more likely to be the same as the parent lead compound. However, the rate of loss of the solubilizing group will depend on the nature of the transfer route, and this could affect the activity of the drug.

=== The position of the water solubilizing group ===
In order to preserve the type of activity exhibited by the lead compound, the water solubilizing group should be attached to a part of the structure that is not involved in the drug–receptor interaction. Consequently, the route used to introduce a new water solubilizing group and its position in the lead structure will depend on the relative reactivities of the pharmacophore and the rest of the molecule. The reagents used to introduce the new water solubilizing group should be chosen on the basis that they do not react with, or in close proximity to, the pharmacophore. This will reduce the possibility of the new group affecting the relevant drug–receptor interactions.

=== Methods of introduction ===
Water solubilizing groups are best introduced at the beginning of a drug synthesis, although they may be introduced at any stage. Introduction at the beginning avoids the problem of a later introduction changing the type and/or nature of the drug–receptor interaction. A wide variety of routes may be used to introduce a water solubilizing group; the one selected will depend on the type of group being introduced and the chemical nature of the target structure. Many of these routes require the use of protecting agents to prevent unwanted reactions of either the water solubilizing group or the lead structure.

=== Acidic and basic groups ===
Examples of water solubilizing structures and the routes used to introduce them into the lead structures. O-alkylation, N-alkylation, O-acylation and N-acylation reactions are used to introduce both acidic and basic groups. Acetylation methods use both the appropriate acid chloride and anhydride.

Examples of water solubilizing structures and the routes used to introduce them into lead structures. Phosphate acid halides have been used to introduce phosphate groups into lead structures. Structures containing hydroxy groups have been introduced by reaction of the corresponding monochlorinated hydrin and the use of suitable epoxides amongst other methods. Sulphonic acid groups may be introduced by either direct sulfonation or the addition of bisulfite to reactive C = C bonds amongst other methods.

== See also ==
- Methylene shuffle
