= MLA-74 =

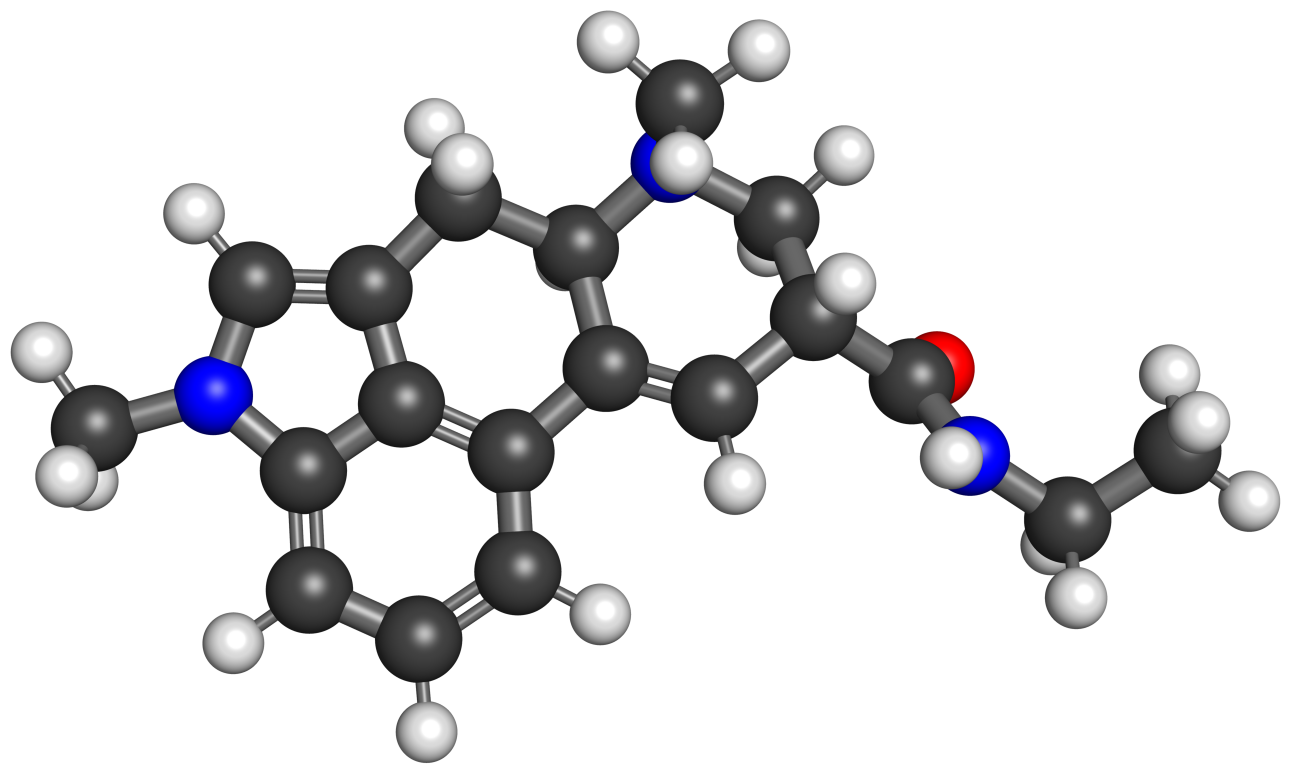

Clinical data
- Other names: MLA74; 1-Methyllysergic acid ethylamide; 1-Methyl-LAE; 1-Methyl-N-ethyllysergamide
- Routes of administration: Oral
- Drug class: Serotonin receptor modulator; Serotonergic psychedelic; Hallucinogen
- ATC code: None

Identifiers
- IUPAC name: (6aR,9R)-N-ethyl-4,7-dimethyl-6,6a,8,9-tetrahydroindolo[4,3-fg]quinoline-9-carboxamide
- CAS Number: 7240-57-5
- PubChem CID: 201993
- ChemSpider: 174916
- CompTox Dashboard (EPA): DTXSID70993192

Chemical and physical data
- Formula: C_{19}H_{23}N_{3}O
- Molar mass: 309.413 g·mol^{−1}
- 3D model (JSmol): Interactive image
- SMILES: CCNC(=O)[C@H]1CN([C@@H]2CC3=CN(C4=CC=CC(=C34)C2=C1)C)C
- InChI: InChI=1S/C19H23N3O/c1-4-20-19(23)13-8-15-14-6-5-7-16-18(14)12(10-21(16)2)9-17(15)22(3)11-13/h5-8,10,13,17H,4,9,11H2,1-3H3,(H,20,23)/t13-,17-/m1/s1; Key:OLUVTYNEBIODME-CXAGYDPISA-N

MLA-74, also known as 1-methyllysergic acid ethylamide (1-methyl-LAE) or as 1-methyl-N-ethyllysergamide, is a psychedelic drug of the lysergamide family related to lysergic acid diethylamide (LSD). It is the 1-methyl derivative of lysergic acid ethylamide (LAE-32). Extensive metabolism of other 1-methylated lysergamides to their secondary amine derivatives, for instance methysergide (1-methylmethylergometrine) conversion into methylergometrine, has been observed.

== Use and effects ==
An active dose of MLA-74 in humans is described as being approximately 2 mg orally and the drug is said to have about 4 to 5% of the potency of LSD. It is also said to have a faster onset and shorter duration than LSD. For comparison, LAE-32 has a listed dose range of 0.5 to 1.6 mg orally, approximately 5 to 10% of the potency of LSD, and is likewise described as faster onset and shorter duration. MLA-74 is about 8-fold less potent than its analogue MLD-41 (1-methyl-LSD). Both MLA-74 and LAE-32 are described as producing LSD-like psychic effects in humans. However, they are both described as producing only slight or weak hallucinogenic effects.

== Pharmacology ==
=== Pharamcodynamics ===
MLA-74 shows about 8.35 times the antiserotonergic activity of LSD in the isolated rat uterus in vitro and about 70-fold the activity of LAE-32 in this assay. Unlike LAE-32, MLA-74 is practically devoid of pyretogenic effects in rabbits and is listed as having 0% of the activity of LSD in this regard.

== History ==
MLA-74 was first described in the scientific literature by the late 1950s.

== See also ==
- Substituted lysergamide
- MLD-41 (1-methyl-LSD)
- MPD-75 (1-methyl-LPD)
- ALA-10 (1-acetyl-LAE; 1A-LAE)
