= Lysergic acid 2-butylamide =

Chemical compound

LSB

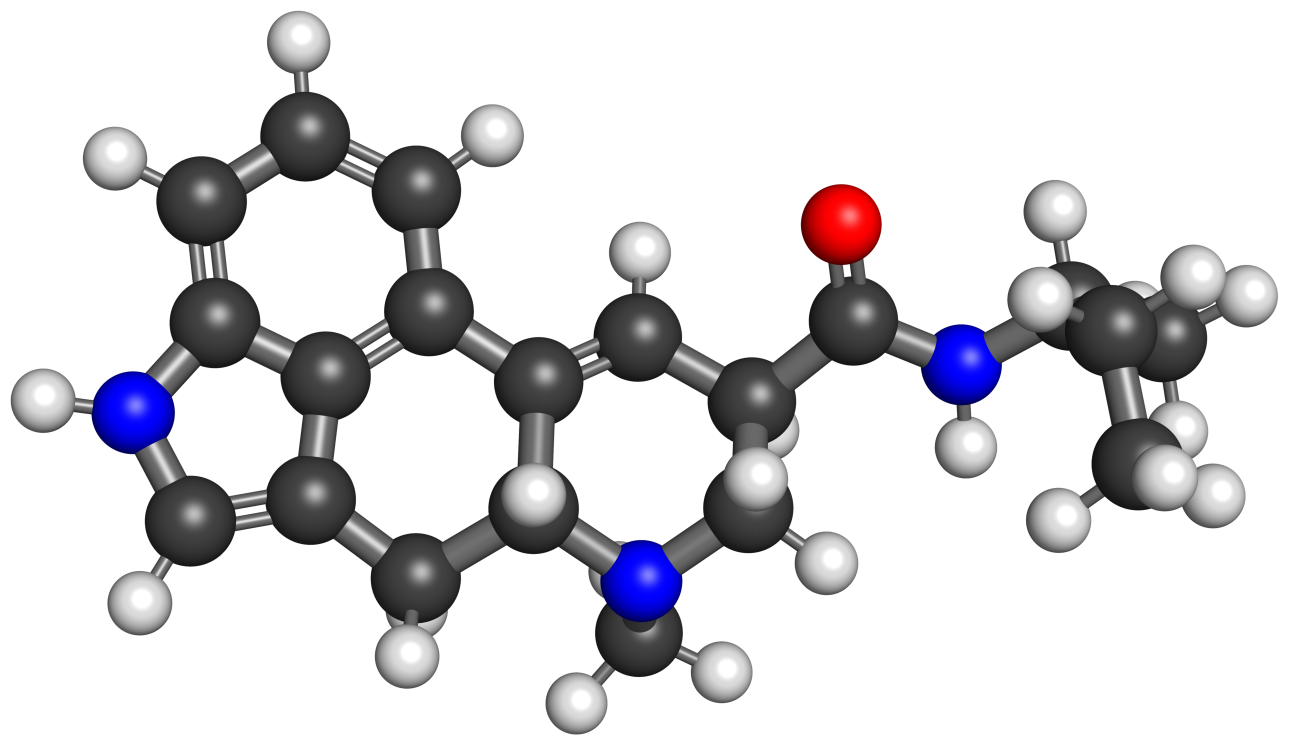

Clinical data
- Other names: Lysergic acid sec-butyl amide; N-(Butan-2-yl)lysergamide; N-sec-Butyllysergamide; NSB-LA; LASBA; (8β)-6-Methyl-N-[(1R)-1-methylpropyl]-9,10-didehydroergoline-8-carboxamide
- Drug class: Serotonin receptor modulator; 5-HT_{2A} receptor agonist

Legal status
- Legal status: DE: NpSG (Industrial and scientific use only); UK: Under Psychoactive Substances Act; US: Schedule I (isomer of LSD); Illegal in France

Identifiers
- IUPAC name: (6aR,9R)-N-butan-2-yl-7-methyl-6,6a,8,9-tetrahydro-4H-indolo[4,3-fg]quinoline-9-carboxamide
- CAS Number: 137765-82-3 (R,R) isomer, freebase 137765-83-4 (R,R) isomer, maleate salt
- PubChem CID: 15119692
- ChemSpider: 23157987
- UNII: RK6W726WK8
- CompTox Dashboard (EPA): DTXSID60929889

Chemical and physical data
- Formula: C_{20}H_{25}N_{3}O
- Molar mass: 323.440 g·mol^{−1}
- 3D model (JSmol): Interactive image
- SMILES: CN1C[C@@H](C(N[C@H](C)CC)=O)C=C2C1CC3=CNC4=C3C2=CC=C4
- InChI: InChI=1S/C20H25N3O/c1-4-12(2)22-20(24)14-8-16-15-6-5-7-17-19(15)13(10-21-17)9-18(16)23(3)11-14/h5-8,10,12,14,18,21H,4,9,11H2,1-3H3,(H,22,24)/t12-,14-,18-/m1/s1; Key:NYFSQPDQLFFBRA-RVZJWNSFSA-N

Lysergic acid 2-butylamide (LSB or LASBA), also known as 2-butyllysergamide, is an analogue of LSD originally developed by Richard Pioch at Eli Lilly in the 1950s, but mostly publicised through research conducted by the team led by David E. Nichols at Purdue University. It is a structural isomer of LSD, with the two ethyl groups on the amide nitrogen having been replaced by a single sec-butyl group, joined at the 2-position.

It is one of the few lysergamide derivatives to exceed the potency of LSD in animal drug discrimination assays, with the (R) isomer having an ED_{50} of 33nmol/kg for producing drug-appropriate responding, vs 48nmol/kg for LSD itself. The corresponding (R)-2-pentyl analogue has higher binding affinity for the 5-HT_{1A} and 5-HT_{2A} receptors, but is less potent in producing drug-appropriate responding, suggesting that the butyl compound has a higher efficacy at the receptor target. The drug discrimination assay for LSD in rats involves both 5-HT_{1A} and 5-HT_{2A} mediated components, and while LSB is more potent than LSD as a 5-HT_{1A} agonist, it is slightly less potent as a 5-HT_{2A} agonist, and so would probably be slightly less potent than LSD as a hallucinogen in humans.

The main use for this drug has been in studies of the binding site at the 5-HT_{2A} receptor through which LSD exerts most of its pharmacological effects, with the stereoselective activity of these unsymmetric monoalkyl lysergamides foreshadowing the subsequent development of compounds such as lysergic acid 2,4-dimethylazetidide (LSZ).

== See also ==
- Substituted lysergamide
- Lysergic acid 3-pentylamide (LSP or 3-LSP)
- Lysergic acid 2-pentylamide (2-LSP)
- Methylisopropyllysergamide (MiPLA)
- Lysergic acid tert-butylamide (LAtB)
- Ergonovine
