= FP-LAD =

Clinical data
- Other names: Fluoro-PRO-LAD; F-PRO-LAD; Fluoropropyl-LAD; PROFLAD; PROF-LAD; TRALA-16; 6-(3-Fluoropropyl)-6-nor-LSD; (8β)-N,N-Diethyl-6-(3-fluoropropyl)-9,10-didehydroergoline-8-carboxamide
- Drug class: Serotonin receptor modulator; Serotonin 5-HT_{2A} receptor agonist
- ATC code: None

Identifiers
- IUPAC name: (6aR,9R)-N,N-diethyl-7-(3-fluoropropyl)-6,6a,8,9-tetrahydro-4H-indolo[4,3-fg]quinoline-9-carboxamide
- PubChem CID: 166091994

Chemical and physical data
- Formula: C_{22}H_{28}FN_{3}O
- Molar mass: 369.484 g·mol^{−1}
- 3D model (JSmol): Interactive image
- SMILES: CCN(CC)C(=O)[C@H]1CN([C@@H]2CC3=CNC4=CC=CC(=C34)C2=C1)CCCF
- InChI: InChI=1S/C22H28FN3O/c1-3-25(4-2)22(27)16-11-18-17-7-5-8-19-21(17)15(13-24-19)12-20(18)26(14-16)10-6-9-23/h5,7-8,11,13,16,20,24H,3-4,6,9-10,12,14H2,1-2H3/t16-,20-/m1/s1; Key:BFFBEQKSDONILF-OXQOHEQNSA-N

FP-LAD, also known as fluoro-PRO-LAD, PROF-LAD, or TRALA-16, is a serotonin receptor modulator of the lysergamide family related to lysergic acid diethylamide (LSD; METH-LAD). It is specifically a fluorinated derivative of PRO-LAD (6-propyl-6-nor-LSD) and an analogue of FLUORETH-LAD (FE-LAD; 6-ethyl-6-nor-LSD).

The drug has been reported to act as a potent ligand of the serotonin 5-HT_{2} receptors. It had affinities (K_{i}) of 0.93 nM at the serotonin 5-HT_{2A} receptor, 1.8 nM at the serotonin 5-HT_{2B} receptor, and 3.7 nM at the serotonin 5-HT_{2C} receptor. FP-LAD was assessed and found to be a full agonist of the serotonin 5-HT_{2A} and 5-HT_{2C} receptors, with EC_{50} and E_{max} values of 0.48 nM (93%) and 1.7 nM (97%), respectively. It had several-fold greater activational potency than LSD at the serotonin 5-HT_{2A} and 5-HT_{2C} receptors.

The chemical synthesis of FP-LAD has been described.

FP-LAD was patented by Daniel Trachsel and Matthias Liechti and colleagues in association with MindMed (Mind Medicine) in 2023. It had also previously been described in an earlier patent by Andrew Kruegel in association with Gilgamesh Pharmaceuticals in 2022. Hamilton Morris has described synthesizing FP-LAD and/or 1P-FP-LAD (1P-PROF-LAD or 1P-PROFLAD) with Lizard Labs in 2025. According to Morris, FP-LAD was active but had only about one-fifth of the potency of LSD.

== See also ==
- Substituted lysergamide
- FLUORETH-LAD (FE-LAD)
- CE-LAD
- ETFELA
- 2C-Te
