= CE-LAD =

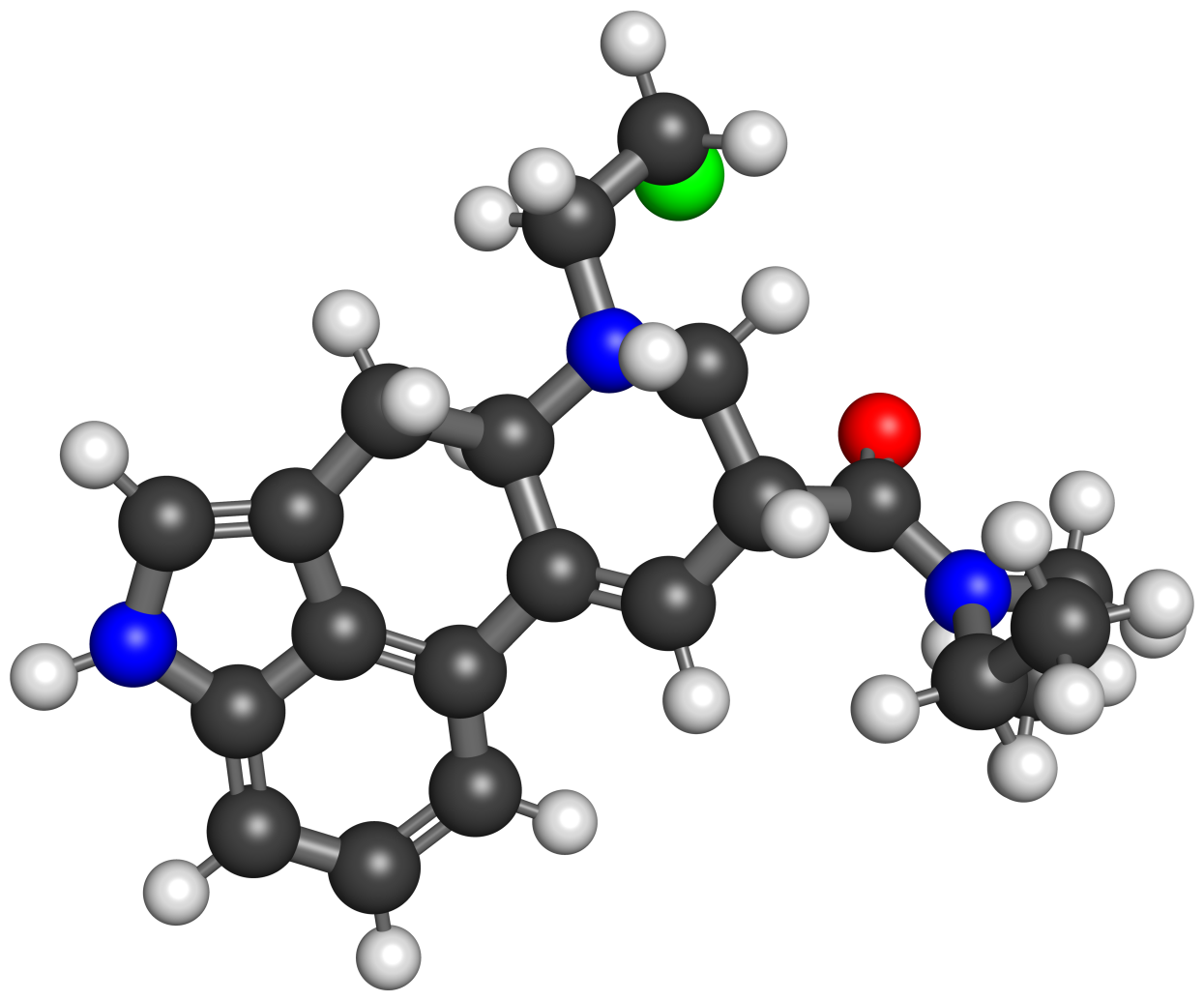

Clinical data
- Other names: 6-(2-Chloroethyl)-6-nor-lysergic acid diethylamide; 6-(2-Chloroethyl)-6-nor-LSD; 6-(2-Chloroethyl)-LAD; CELAD; Cl-ETH-LAD; CHLORETH-LAD; CHLORETHLAD; 9,10-Didehydro-N,N-diethyl-6-(2-chloroethyl)-ergoline-8β-carboxamide
- Drug class: Possible alkylating or irreversible serotonin 5-HT_{2A} receptor ligand

Identifiers
- IUPAC name: (6aR,9R)-N,N-diethyl-7-(2-chloroethyl)-6,6a,8,9-tetrahydro-4H-indolo[4,3-fg]quinoline-9-carboxamide

Chemical and physical data
- Formula: C_{21}H_{25}ClN_{3}O
- Molar mass: 370.90 g·mol^{−1}
- 3D model (JSmol): Interactive image
- SMILES: CCN(CC)C([C@H]1CN(CCCl)[C@@]2(CC3=CNC4=CC=CC(C2=C1)=C34)[H])=O
- InChI: InChI=1S/C21H26ClN3O/c1-3-24(4-2)21(26)15-10-17-16-6-5-7-18-20(16)14(12-23-18)11-19(17)25(13-15)9-8-22/h5-7,10,12,15,19,23H,3-4,8-9,11,13H2,1-2H3/t15-,19-/m1/s1; Key:MRUUQMMGHGQGEK-DNVCBOLYSA-N

CE-LAD, or CHLORETH-LAD, also known as 6-(2-chloroethyl)-LAD or 6-(2-chloroethyl)-6-nor-LSD, is a compound of the lysergamide family related to the serotonergic psychedelic lysergic acid diethylamide (LSD). It was developed by psychedelic chemist David E. Nichols at UNC-Chapel Hill (formerly Purdue University) for potential use in scientific research.

The compound is an analogue of LSD and ETH-LAD (6-ethyl-6-nor-LSD) in which the 6-position N-alkyl chain has been replaced with a nitrogen mustard 2-chloroethyl group. Nichols developed CE-LAD in hopes that it would be an alkylating irreversible ligand of a mutant serotonin 5-HT_{2A} receptor that could help facilitate study of serotonin 5-HT_{2A} protein–ligand complexes.

CE-LAD was said by journalist Hamilton Morris to have been one of Nichols's final creations prior to his retirement. It was described by Morris in 2021 in the final episode of his TV show Hamilton's Pharmacopeia. Nichols related that the compound had previously proved to be synthetically inaccessible for many years. Although Nichols appears to have successfully synthesized CE-LAD, the results of the work with the compound do not appear to have been published or reported.

In 2022, a closely related drug, FLUORETH-LAD (FE-LAD), was synthesized and found to have similarly high affinity for the serotonin 5-HT_{2A} receptor as LSD.

== See also ==
- Substituted lysergamide
- FLUORETH-LAD
- FP-LAD
- LA-3Cl-SB
- α-Chloromethylmescaline
