= ALA-10 =

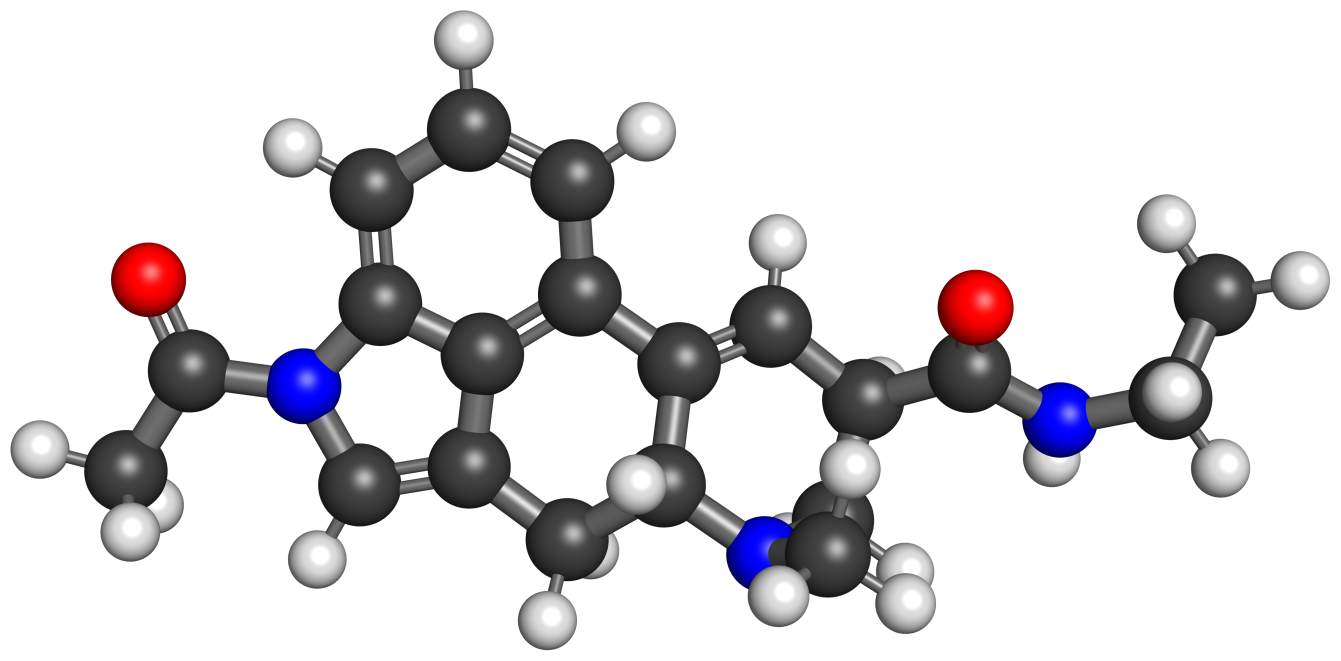

Clinical data
- Other names: ALA10; 1-Acetyl-LAE; 1A-LAE; 1-Acetyl-LAE-32; 1A-LAE-32; 1-Acetyllysergic acid ethylamide; 1-Acetyl-N-ethyllysergamide; 1-Acetyl-N-ethyl-6-methyl-9,10-didehydroergoline-8β-carboxamide
- Routes of administration: Oral
- Drug class: Serotonin receptor modulator; Serotonergic psychedelic; Hallucinogen
- ATC code: None

Identifiers
- IUPAC name: (6aR,9R)-4-acetyl-N-ethyl-7-methyl-6,6a,8,9-tetrahydroindolo[4,3-fg]quinoline-9-carboxamide
- CAS Number: 50485-03-5
- PubChem CID: 3039342
- ChemSpider: 2302828
- CompTox Dashboard (EPA): DTXSID90198506

Chemical and physical data
- Formula: C_{20}H_{23}N_{3}O_{2}
- Molar mass: 337.423 g·mol^{−1}
- 3D model (JSmol): Interactive image
- SMILES: CCNC(=O)[C@H]1CN([C@@H]2CC3=CN(C4=CC=CC(=C34)C2=C1)C(=O)C)C
- InChI: InChI=1S/C20H23N3O2/c1-4-21-20(25)14-8-16-15-6-5-7-17-19(15)13(11-23(17)12(2)24)9-18(16)22(3)10-14/h5-8,11,14,18H,4,9-10H2,1-3H3,(H,21,25)/t14-,18-/m1/s1; Key:UKRWCEJTOPSTEC-RDTXWAMCSA-N

ALA-10, also known as 1-acetyl-LAE (1A-LAE), is a psychedelic drug of the lysergamide family related to lysergic acid diethylamide (LSD). It is the 1-acetyl derivative of LAE-32. 1-Acetylated lysergamides like ALD-52 (1-acetyl-LSD; 1A-LSD) are thought to function as prodrugs via deacetylation to the 1-unsubstituted analogues, which in the case of ALD-52 is LSD.

== Use and effects ==
ALA-10 is active at a dose of approximately 1.2 mg orally in humans and has around 7 to 10% of the potency of LSD. It produces LSD-like psychic effects. It is said to have a quicker onset and shorter duration than LSD. For comparison, LAE-32, has a dose range of 0.5 to 1.6 mg, about 5 to 10% of the activity of LSD, and a likewise faster onset and shorter duration than LSD. Both ALA-10 and LAE-32 are said to produce only slight or weak hallucinogenic effects. ALA-10 is around 15-fold less potent than ALD-52 (1-acetyl-LSD), which is roughly equipotent with LSD.

== Pharmacology ==
=== Pharmacodynamics ===
ALA-10 shows antiserotonergic activity in the isolated rat uterus of about 39% of that of LSD but about 3 times stronger than that of LAE-32. Its pyretogenic potency in rabbits is only about 1% of that of LSD.

== History ==
ALA-10 was first described in the scientific literature by the late 1950s.

== See also ==
- Substituted lysergamide
- MLA-74 (1-methyl-LAE)
- ALD-52 (1-acetyl-LSD; 1A-LSD)
