= Lysergic acid tert-butylamide =

LAtB

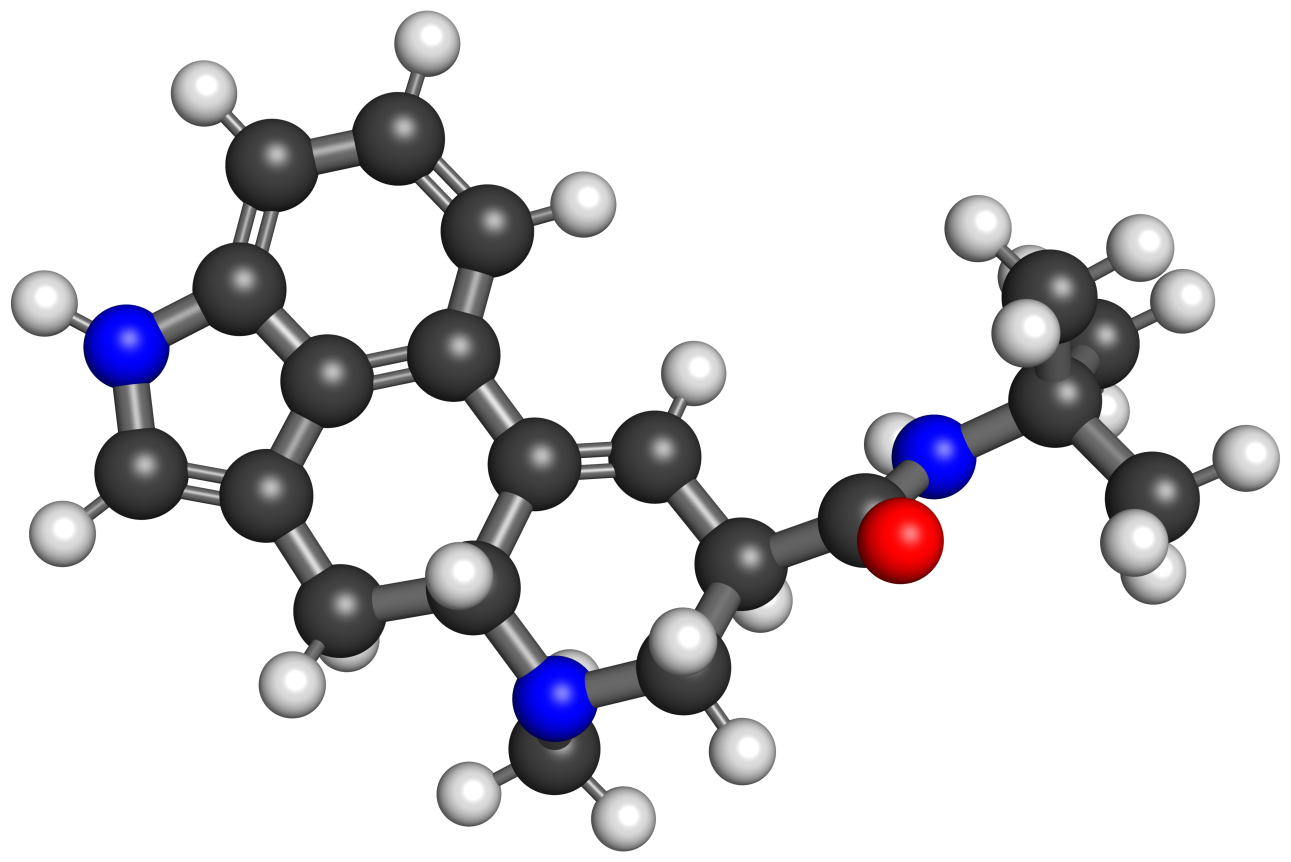

Clinical data
- Other names: LAtB; N-tert-Butyllysergamide; NtB-LA
- Drug class: Serotonin receptor modulator; Serotonin 5-HT_{2A} receptor agonist; Serotonergic psychedelic; Hallucinogen
- ATC code: None

Identifiers
- IUPAC name: (6aR,9R)-N-tert-butyl-7-methyl-6,6a,8,9-tetrahydro-4H-indolo[4,3-fg]quinoline-9-carboxamide
- PubChem CID: 154273364

Chemical and physical data
- Formula: C_{20}H_{25}N_{3}O
- Molar mass: 323.440 g·mol^{−1}
- 3D model (JSmol): Interactive image
- SMILES: CC(C)(C)NC(=O)[C@H]1CN([C@@H]2CC3=CNC4=CC=CC(=C34)C2=C1)C
- InChI: InChI=1S/C20H25N3O/c1-20(2,3)22-19(24)13-8-15-14-6-5-7-16-18(14)12(10-21-16)9-17(15)23(4)11-13/h5-8,10,13,17,21H,9,11H2,1-4H3,(H,22,24)/t13-,17-/m1/s1; Key:UTEDIDSANBDUDS-CXAGYDPISA-N

Lysergic acid tert-butylamide (LAtB), also known as N-tert-butyllysergamide (NtB-LA), is a psychedelic drug of the lysergamide family related to lysergic acid diethylamide (LSD). It was described in an early patent as reportedly being psychoactive and hallucinogenic and as producing hypothermia and "anti-hypothalamic" effects presumably in animals. The drug shows activity at serotonin receptors, but is a very low-potency agonist of the serotonin 5-HT_{2A} receptor. The chemical synthesis of LAtB has been described and analytical characterization has been described. It was first described in the literature in a patent by Richard P. Pioch at Eli Lilly and Company in 1961 (filed in 1956). The drug's pharmacology was later studied by David E. Nichols and colleagues.

== See also ==
- Substituted lysergamide
- Lysergic acid isopropylamide (LAiP, IPLA)
- Lysergic acid sec-butylamide (LSB)
- Lysergic acid cyclobutylamide (LAcB)
