= EiPLA =

Chemical compound

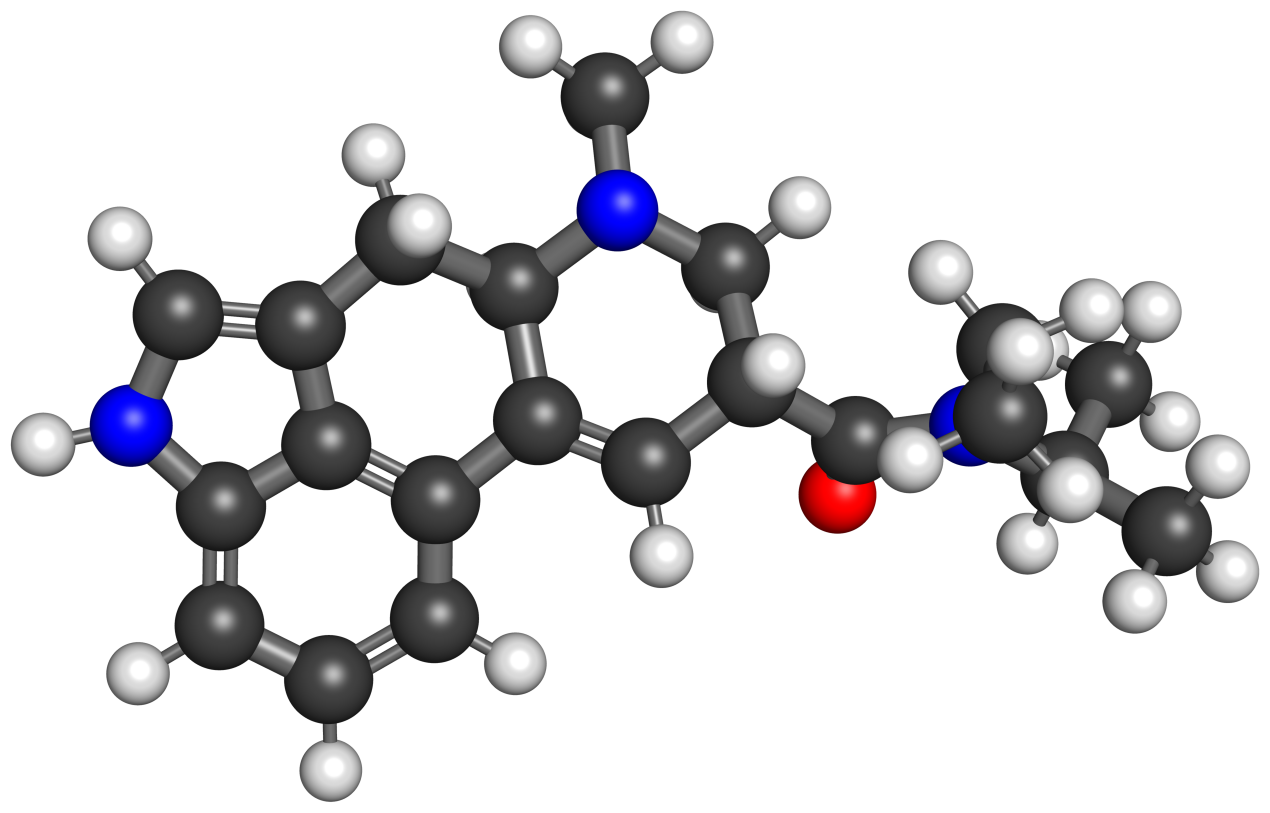

Clinical data
- Other names: EiPLA; Ethylisopropyllysergamide; N-Ethyl-N-isopropyllysergamide; Lysergic acid ethylisopropylamide
- Routes of administration: Oral
- Drug class: Serotonin receptor modulator; Serotonin 5-HT_{2A} receptor agonist; Serotonergic psychedelic; Hallucinogen

Legal status
- Legal status: DE: NpSG (Industrial and scientific use only); UK: Under Psychoactive Substances Act

Identifiers
- IUPAC name: (6aR,9R)-N-ethyl-7-methyl-N-propan-2-yl-6,6a,8,9-tetrahydro-4H-indolo[4,3-fg]quinoline-9-carboxamide
- CAS Number: 154504-04-8
- PubChem CID: 101661197

Chemical and physical data
- Formula: C_{21}H_{27}N_{3}O
- Molar mass: 337.467 g·mol^{−1}
- 3D model (JSmol): Interactive image
- SMILES: CCN(C(C)C)C(=O)[C@H]1CN([C@@H]2CC3=CNC4=CC=CC(=C34)C2=C1)C
- InChI: InChI=1S/C21H27N3O/c1-5-24(13(2)3)21(25)15-9-17-16-7-6-8-18-20(16)14(11-22-18)10-19(17)23(4)12-15/h6-9,11,13,15,19,22H,5,10,12H2,1-4H3/t15-,19-/m1/s1; Key:JLPRDEGOBAGMHN-DNVCBOLYSA-N

EiPLA, also known as N-ethyl-N-isopropyllysergamide or as lysergic acid ethylisopropylamide, is a psychedelic drug of the lysergamide family related to lysergic acid diethylamide (LSD). It is an isomer of ETH-LAD.

== Use and effects ==
EiPLA has been identified in blotter containing doses of 86 to 97 μg base equivalent per tab. Blotter containing 200 μg per tab has also been described. Anecdotal reports suggest that EiPLA produces psychedelic effects but is less potent than LSD.

== Pharmacology ==
=== Pharmacodynamics ===
In drug discrimination tests in rodents, EiPLA was found to have approximately half the potency of LSD.

== Chemistry ==
=== Analogues ===
Analogues of EiPLA include MiPLA, LAMPA (MPLA), EPLA, EcPLA, and ETFELA, among others.

== History ==
EiPLA was first described in the scientific literature by David E. Nichols and colleagues by at least 1994. It appears to have emerged as a novel designer drug by 2019.

== See also ==
- Substituted lysergamide
- Lizard Labs
