= LAMPA =

Chemical compound

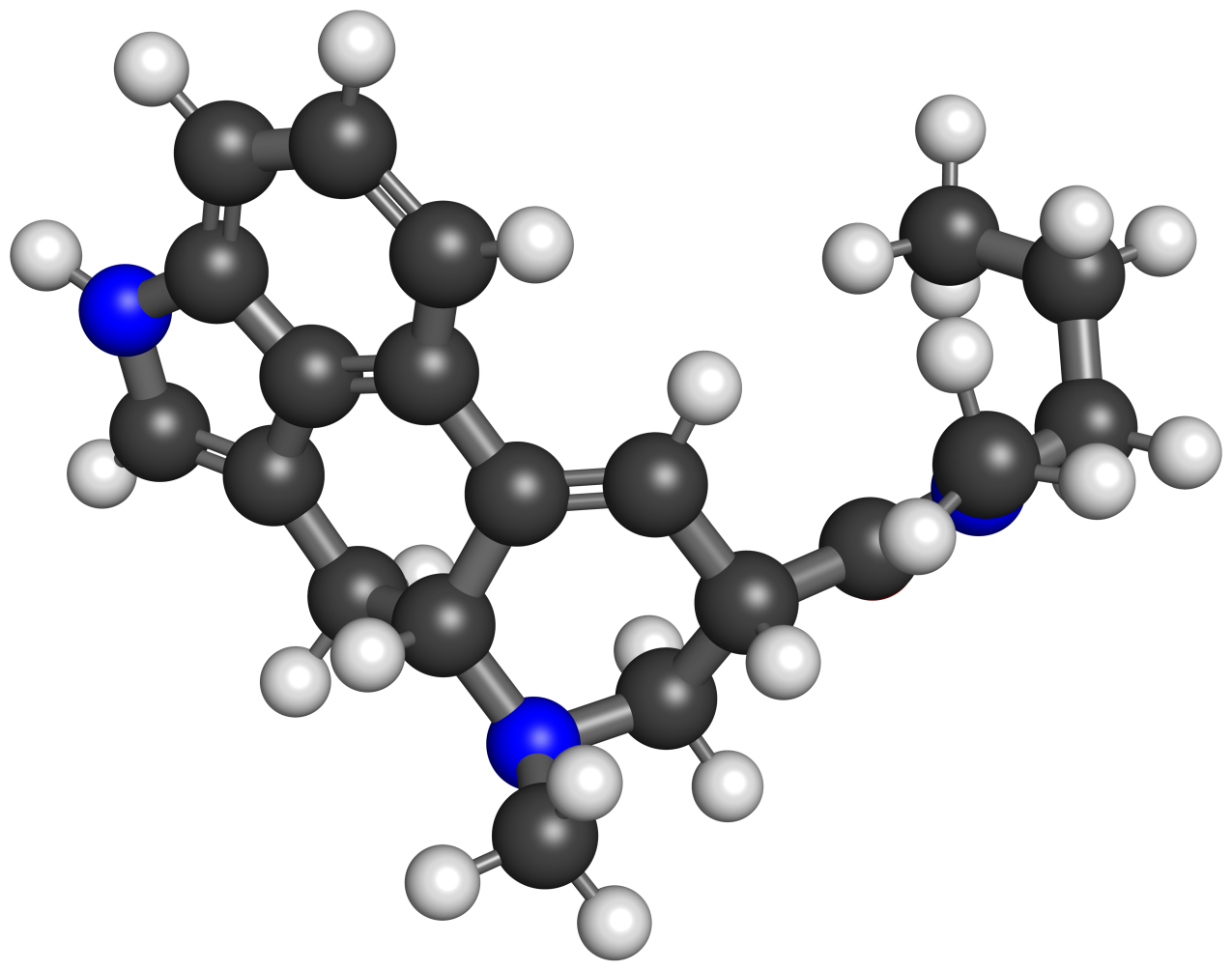

Clinical data
- Other names: Lysergic acid methylpropylamide; LMP; LAMP; LAMPA; LMP-55; LMP55; MPLA; N-Methyl-N-propyllysergamide; N,6-Dimethyl-N-propyl-9,10-didehydroergoline-8β-carboxamide

Legal status
- Legal status: US: Schedule I (isomer of LSD)

Identifiers
- IUPAC name: N,7-dimethyl-N-propyl-6,6a,8,9-tetrahydro-4H-indolo[4,3-fg]quinoline-9-carboxamide
- CAS Number: 40158-98-3
- PubChem CID: 613620
- ChemSpider: 533384
- UNII: H8T6RER0YI
- CompTox Dashboard (EPA): DTXSID701043313

Chemical and physical data
- Formula: C_{20}H_{25}N_{3}O
- Molar mass: 323.440 g·mol^{−1}
- 3D model (JSmol): Interactive image
- SMILES: CCCN(C)C(=O)C1CN(C2CC3=CNC4=CC=CC(=C34)C2=C1)C
- InChI: InChI=1S/C20H25N3O/c1-4-8-22(2)20(24)14-9-16-15-6-5-7-17-19(15)13(11-21-17)10-18(16)23(3)12-14/h5-7,9,11,14,18,21H,4,8,10,12H2,1-3H3; Key:CZRJGQXHVRNZRZ-UHFFFAOYSA-N

Lysergic acid methylpropylamide (LAMPA, LAMP, or LMP), also known as LMP-55 or as N-methyl-N-propyllysergamide (MPLA), is a structural analogue of lysergic acid diethylamide (LSD) that has been studied as a potential treatment for alcoholism. In animal studies, LAMPA was found to be nearly equipotent to ECPLA and MIPLA for inducing a head-twitch response. LAMPA appears to be significantly less potent than LSD in humans, producing little to no noticeable effects at doses of 100 μg. It shows reduced-efficacy partial agonism of the serotonin 5-HT_{2A} receptor relative to LSD, which may be responsible for its equivocal hallucinogenic effects. LAMPA is not an explicitly controlled substance in the United States, but may be considered implicitly controlled as it is an isomer of LSD. The drug is not a controlled substance in Canada as of 2025.

== See also ==
- Substituted lysergamide
- Ethylcyclopropyllysergamide (ECPLA)
- Methylisopropyllysergamide (MIPLA)
- Ethylpropyllysergamide (EPLA)
