= 1P-MiPLA =

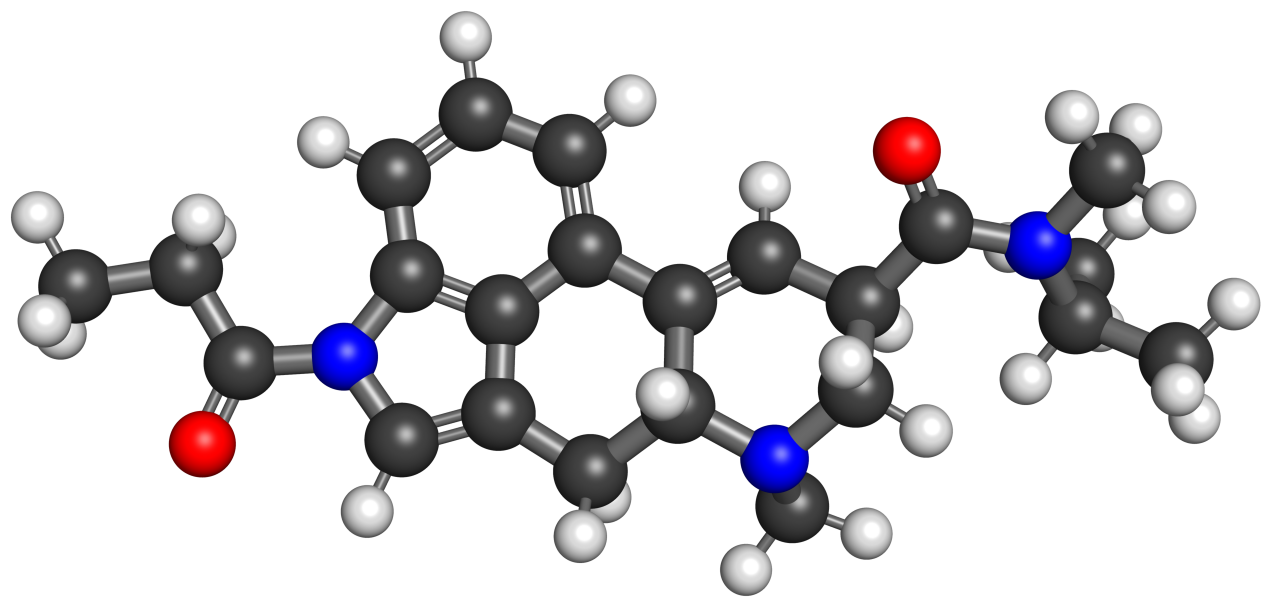

Clinical data
- Other names: 1P-MIPLA; 1-Propanoyl-lysergic acid methylisopropylamide; 1-Propanoyl-MiPLA; N,6-Dimethyl-1-propanoyl-N-(propan-2-yl)-9,10-didehydroergoline-8β-carboxamide
- Drug class: Serotonergic psychedelic; Hallucinogen
- ATC code: None

Identifiers
- IUPAC name: (6aR,9R)-N,7-dimethyl-4-propanoyl-N-(propan-2-yl)-4,6,6a,7,8,9-hexahydroindolo[4,3-fg]quinoline-9-carboxamide
- PubChem CID: 170763683
- ChemSpider: 128938052

Chemical and physical data
- Formula: C_{23}H_{29}N_{3}O_{2}
- Molar mass: 379.504 g·mol^{−1}
- 3D model (JSmol): Interactive image
- SMILES: CCC(=O)n1cc2c3c1cccc3C1=C[C@H](CN([C@@H]1C2)C)C(=O)N(C(C)C)C
- InChI: InChI=1S/C23H29N3O2/c1-6-21(27)26-13-15-11-20-18(17-8-7-9-19(26)22(15)17)10-16(12-24(20)4)23(28)25(5)14(2)3/h7-10,13-14,16,20H,6,11-12H2,1-5H3/t16-,20-/m1/s1; Key:ISWISZIALPXJJD-OXQOHEQNSA-N

1P-MiPLA, also known as 1-propanoyl-lysergic acid methylisopropylamide (1-propanoyl-MiPLA), is a designer drug and presumed serotonergic psychedelic of the lysergamide family related to lysergic acid diethylamide (LSD). It is the 1-propanoyl derivative of MiPLA and may act as a prodrug of MiPLA. 1P-MiPLA has been discussed on specialized online forums since 2018. In addition, a designer drug product labeled "1P-MiPLA" but actually containing MiPLA was encountered in Austria in 2019.

== Society and culture ==
=== Legal status ===
==== Canada ====
1P-MiPLA is a controlled substance in Canada under phenethylamine blanket-ban language.

==== United States ====
1P-MiPLA is not an explicitly controlled substance in the United States. However, it could be considered a controlled substance under the Federal Analogue Act if intended for human consumption.

== See also ==
- Substituted lysergamide
- 1P-LSD
- Lizard Labs
