= LAE-32 =

Chemical compound

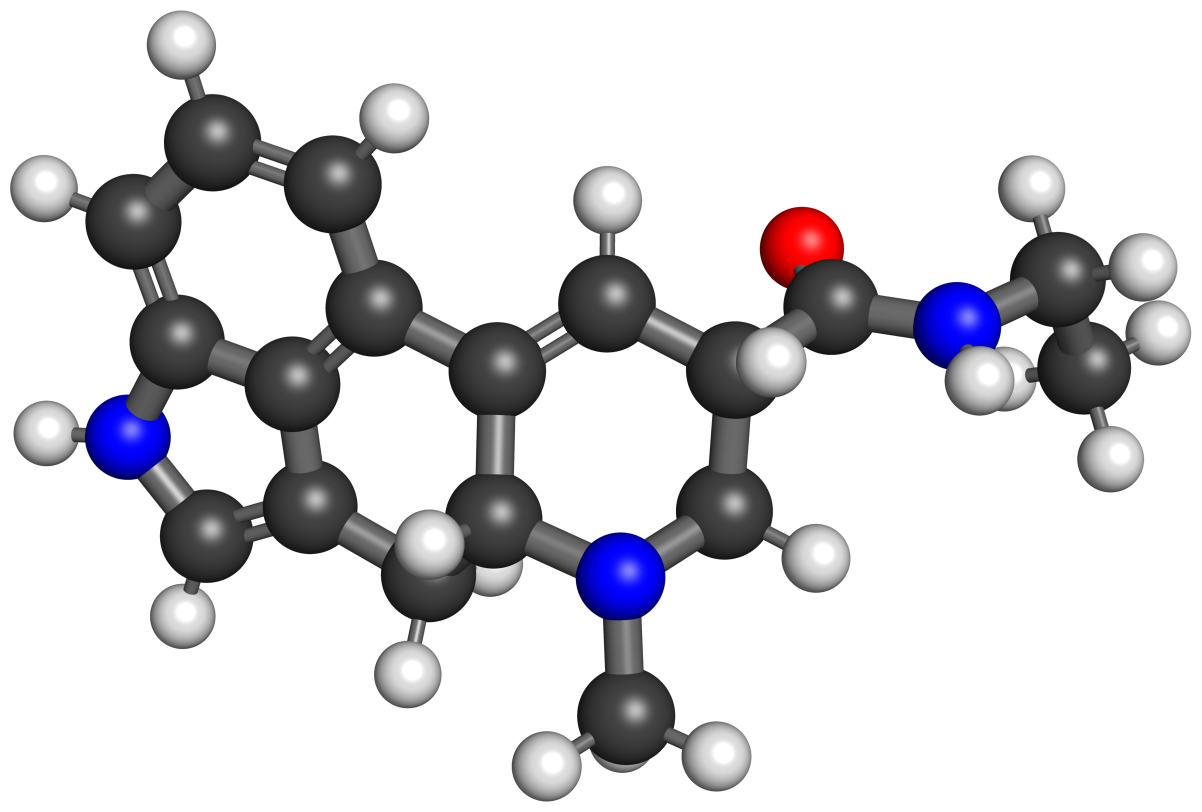

Clinical data
- Other names: LAE32; LAE; LSE; Lysergic acid ethylamide; Lysergic acid monoethylamide; N-Ethyllysergamide; NE-LA; N-Ethylergine; N-Ethyl-LSA; N-Ethyl-6-methyl-9,10-didehydroergoline-8β-carboxamide
- Routes of administration: Oral, intramuscular injection, subcutaneous injection
- Drug class: Serotonergic psychedelic; Hallucinogen
- ATC code: None

Identifiers
- IUPAC name: (6aR,9R)-N-ethyl-7-methyl-6,6a,8,9-tetrahydro-4H-indolo[4,3-fg]quinoline-9-carboxamide
- CAS Number: 478-99-9
- PubChem CID: 12304966
- ChemSpider: 19975296
- UNII: 72370WPF0J
- CompTox Dashboard (EPA): DTXSID20963946

Chemical and physical data
- Formula: C_{18}H_{21}N_{3}O
- Molar mass: 295.386 g·mol^{−1}
- 3D model (JSmol): Interactive image
- SMILES: CCNC(=O)[C@H]1CN([C@@H]2CC3=CNC4=CC=CC(=C34)C2=C1)C
- InChI: InChI=1S/C18H21N3O/c1-3-19-18(22)12-7-14-13-5-4-6-15-17(13)11(9-20-15)8-16(14)21(2)10-12/h4-7,9,12,16,20H,3,8,10H2,1-2H3,(H,19,22)/t12-,16-/m1/s1; Key:VEBWTGYUIBTVNR-MLGOLLRUSA-N

Lysergic acid ethylamide (LAE-32 or LAE), also known as N-ethyllysergamide, is a psychedelic drug of the lysergamide family related to lysergic acid diethylamide (LSD). It is the analogue of LSD in which one of the ethyl groups on the amide moiety has been removed.

The drug is reported to have some LSD-like effects but is weaker and shorter-lasting, with an active dose reported to be between 0.5 and 1.6 mg by different routes of administration including subcutaneous or intramuscular injection and oral administration. Side effects like apathy and sedation have been reported.

Analogues of LAE-32 include LSD, MLA-74 (1-methyl-LAE), ALA-10 (1-acetyl-LAE; 1A-LAE), lysergic acid methylamide (LAM), lysergic acid propylamide (LAP), LME-54 (lysergic acid methylethylamide), and LEP-57 (lysergic acid ethylpropylamide; EPLA), among others.

LAE-32 was first described in the scientific literature by Albert Hofmann and colleagues by 1955. It was studied by the CIA as part of Project MKULTRA. Documents published by the CIA under the Freedom of Information Act suggest it causes "a schizophrenia-like condition" but it allows people with schizophrenia to remain indifferent to their disorder. The drug has also been studied in psychedelic-assisted psychotherapy. It is not a controlled substance in Canada as of 2025.

== See also ==
- Substituted lysergamide
