= FLUORETH-LAD =

Chemical compound

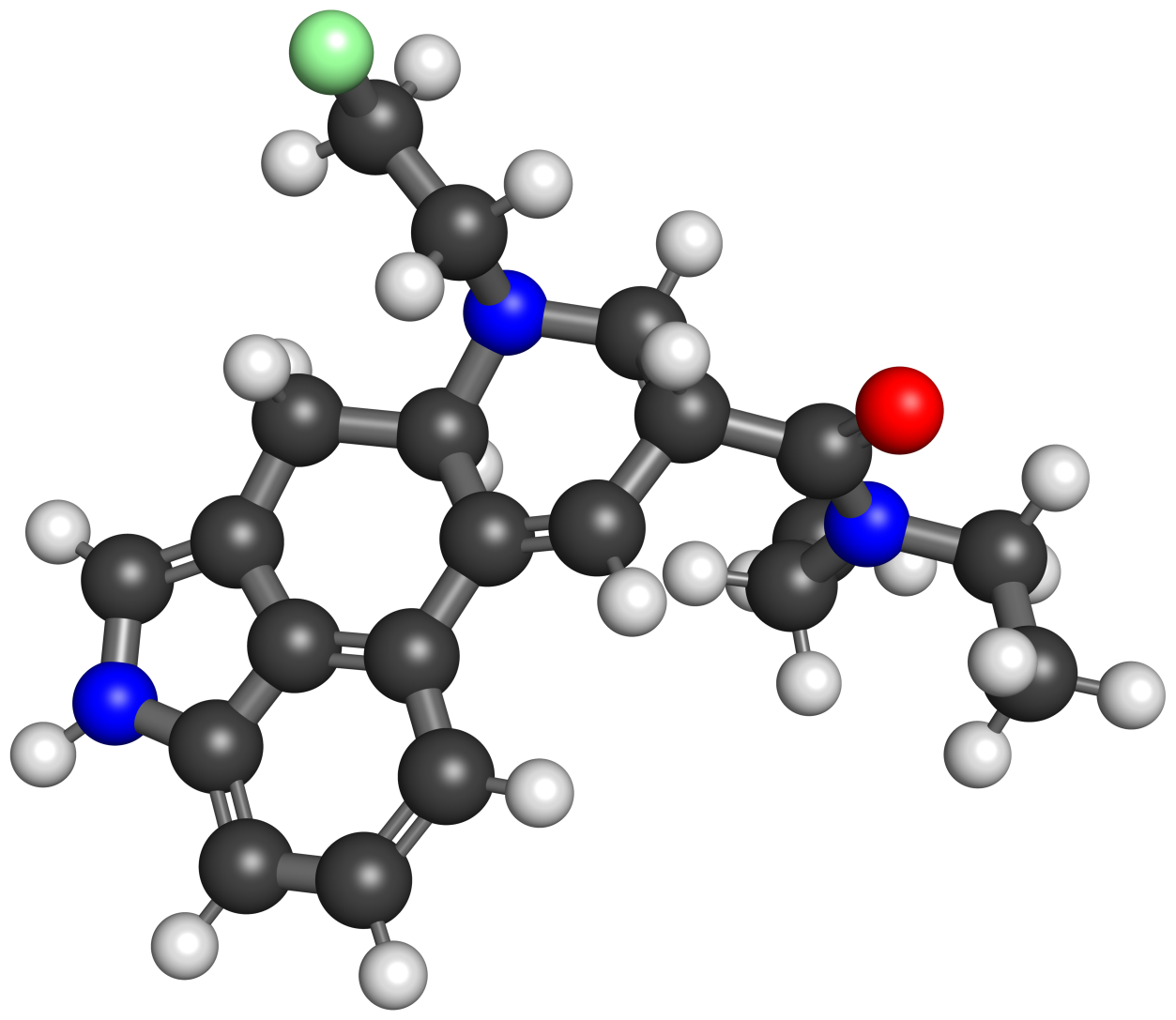

Clinical data
- Other names: TRALA-15; FE-LAD; 6-(2-Fluoroethyl)-6-nor-LSD; 6-(2-Fluoroethyl)-LAD; N,N-Diethyl-6-(2-fluoroethyl)-9,10-didehydroergoline-8β-carboxamide
- Drug class: Serotonin receptor modulator

Identifiers
- IUPAC name: (6aR,9R)-N,N-diethyl-7-(2-fluoroethyl)-6,6a,8,9-tetrahydro-4H-indolo[4,3-fg]quinoline-9-carboxamide
- CAS Number: 2757566-18-8
- PubChem CID: 168105608

Chemical and physical data
- Formula: C_{21}H_{26}FN_{3}O
- Molar mass: 355.457 g·mol^{−1}
- 3D model (JSmol): Interactive image
- SMILES: CCN(CC)C(=O)[C@H]1CN([C@@H]2CC3=CNC4=CC=CC(=C34)C2=C1)CCF
- InChI: InChI=1S/C21H26FN3O/c1-3-24(4-2)21(26)15-10-17-16-6-5-7-18-20(16)14(12-23-18)11-19(17)25(13-15)9-8-22/h5-7,10,12,15,19,23H,3-4,8-9,11,13H2,1-2H3/t15-,19-/m1/s1; Key:UYFDKYZWVLEHQH-DNVCBOLYSA-N

FLUORETH-LAD (TRALA-15), or FE-LAD, also known as 6-(2-fluoroethyl)-LAD or 6-(2-fluoroethyl)-6-nor-LSD, is a lysergamide derivative. It was first proposed by Alexander and Ann Shulgin in their book TiHKAL, but was never synthesised by them.

Synthesis and activity data for the compound were first reported in a 2022 patent by Matthias Grill, in which pharmacological testing showed it to have similar affinity to LSD at some targets such as the 5-HT_{1A} and 5-HT_{2A} serotonin receptors, but much lower affinity at other targets such as 5-HT_{2C} and at dopamine receptors, giving it comparatively greater selectivity compared to LSD.

A patent for this compound is currently held by Swiss company MiHKAL GmbH.

== See also ==
- Substituted lysergamide
- FP-LAD
- CE-LAD
- AL-LAD
- ETH-LAD
- PRO-LAD
