= Lysergic acid 2-pentylamide =

Clinical data
- Other names: 2-LSP; N-(Pentan-2-yl)lysergamide; N-Pentan-2-yllysergamide; N-(2-Pentyl)lysergamide; N-(sec-Pentyl)lysergamide; N2Pe-LA; Lysergic acid 2-pentylamide; N-(2-Amyl)lysergamide; 6-Methyl-N-(pentan-2-yl)-9,10-didehydroergoline-8β-carboxamide; 2-APLA
- Drug class: Serotonin receptor modulator
- ATC code: None

Identifiers
- IUPAC name: (6aR,9R)-7-methyl-N-pentan-2-yl-6,6a,8,9-tetrahydro-4H-indolo[4,3-fg]quinoline-9-carboxamide
- PubChem CID: 44384967
- ChemSpider: 23240517
- ChEMBL: ChEMBL367921

Chemical and physical data
- Formula: C_{21}H_{27}N_{3}O
- Molar mass: 337.467 g·mol^{−1}
- 3D model (JSmol): Interactive image
- SMILES: CCCC(C)NC(=O)[C@H]1CN([C@@H]2CC3=CNC4=CC=CC(=C34)C2=C1)C
- InChI: InChI=1S/C21H27N3O/c1-4-6-13(2)23-21(25)15-9-17-16-7-5-8-18-20(16)14(11-22-18)10-19(17)24(3)12-15/h5,7-9,11,13,15,19,22H,4,6,10,12H2,1-3H3,(H,23,25)/t13?,15-,19-/m1/s1; Key:JGLCNUHMSLNTLJ-NWLOPNIYSA-N

Lysergic acid 2-pentylamide (2-LSP), also known as N-(2-pentyl)lysergamide (N2Pe-LA), is a serotonin receptor modulator and possible psychedelic drug of the lysergamide family related to lysergic acid diethylamide (LSD). It is a mixture of (R)- and (S)- enantiomers.

Both enantiomers of 2-LSP show affinity for the serotonin 5-HT_{1A}, 5-HT_{2A}, and 5-HT_{2C} receptors, but (R)-2-LSP shows far greater affinity for these receptors in comparison. (R)-2-LSP had about the same affinity as LSD for the serotonin 5-HT_{2A} receptor (K_{i} = 4.5–10 nM; K_{0.5} = 0.99–1.0 nM), but had 0.8- to 9-fold higher affinity than LSD for the serotonin 5-HT_{1A} receptor (K_{i} = 0.6–1.4 nM; K_{0.5} = 0.37 nM). Both (R)- and (S)-2-LSP act as full agonists of the serotonin 5-HT_{2A} receptor, but (R)-LSP is nearly 20-fold more potent than (S)-LSP in this regard EC_{50} (E_{max}) = 5.4 nM (100%) and 91 nM (100%), respectively). Both enantiomers are also serotonin 5-HT_{2C} receptor agonists, with (R)-LSP likewise being much more active than (S)-LSP. (R)-2-LSP fully substituted for LSD in rodent drug discrimination tests, with about half the potency of LSD. Conversely, (S)-2-LSP did not substitute for LSD in these tests.

The chemical synthesis of 2-LSP has been described.

2-LSP was first described in the scientific literature by David E. Nichols and colleagues by 1995.

== See also ==
- Substituted lysergamide
- Lysergic acid 2-butylamide (LSB)
- Lysergic acid 3-pentylamide (LSP, 3-LSP)
- Lysergic acid butylamide
