= Lysergic acid 3-pentylamide =

Chemical compound

LSP

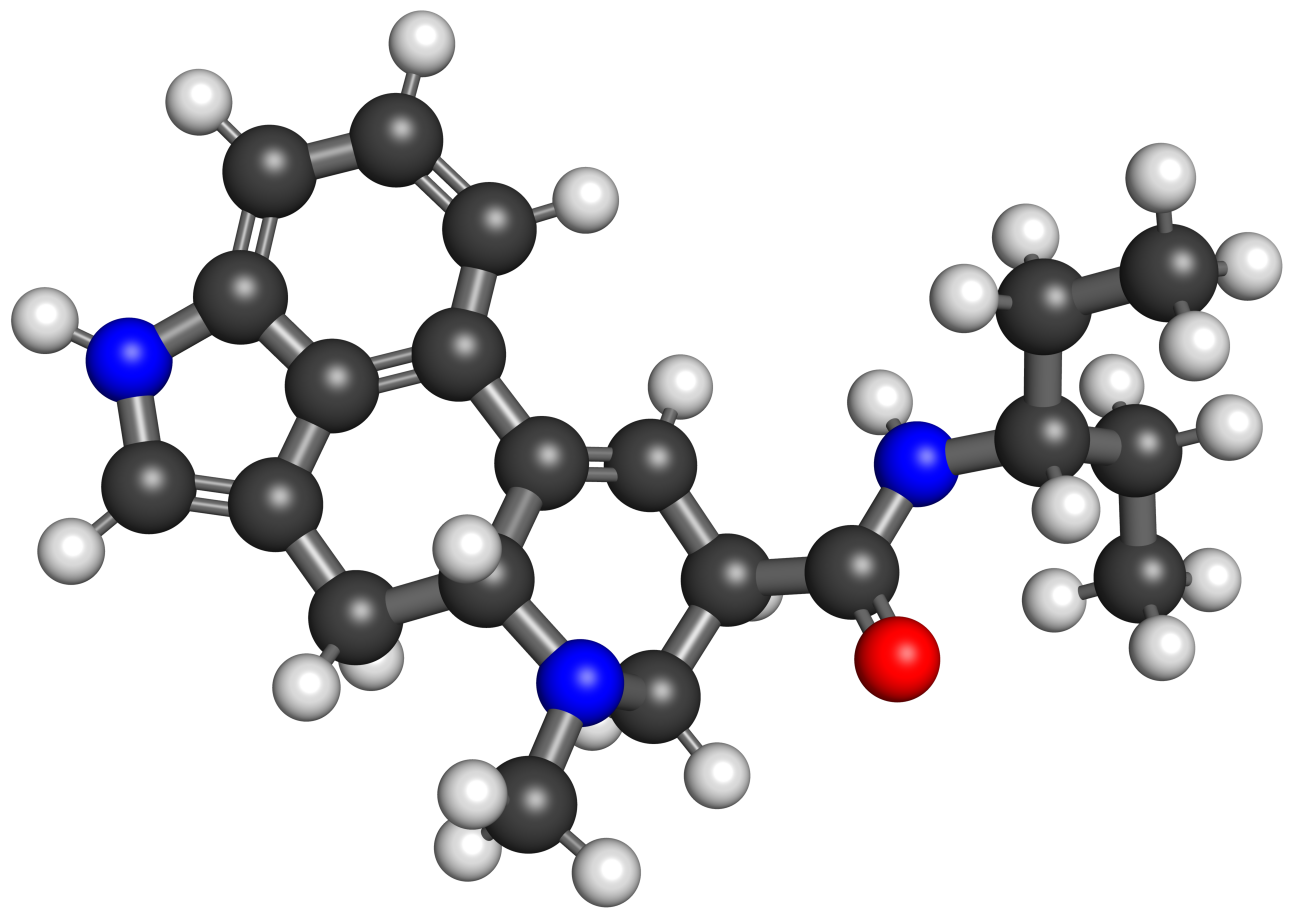

Clinical data
- Other names: LSP; Lysergic acid 3-pentylamide; N-(3-Pentyl)lysergamide; (8β)-6-Methyl-N-(3-pentyl)-9,10-didehydroergoline-8-carboxamide
- Drug class: Serotonin receptor modulator; 5-HT_{2A} receptor agonist

Legal status
- Legal status: DE: NpSG (Industrial and scientific use only); UK: Under Psychoactive Substances Act

Identifiers
- IUPAC name: (6aR,9R)-7-methyl-N-pentan-3-yl-6,6a,8,9-tetrahydro-4H-indolo[4,3-fg]quinoline-9-carboxamide
- CAS Number: 162105-96-6
- PubChem CID: 10019984
- ChemSpider: 8195557
- ChEMBL: ChEMBL424777
- CompTox Dashboard (EPA): DTXSID001029687

Chemical and physical data
- Formula: C_{21}H_{27}N_{3}O
- Molar mass: 337.467 g·mol^{−1}
- 3D model (JSmol): Interactive image
- SMILES: [H][C@@]12C(C3=C4C(NC=C4C2)=CC=C3)=C[C@@H](C(NC(CC)CC)=O)CN1C
- InChI: InChI=1S/C21H27N3O/c1-4-15(5-2)23-21(25)14-9-17-16-7-6-8-18-20(16)13(11-22-18)10-19(17)24(3)12-14/h6-9,11,14-15,19,22H,4-5,10,12H2,1-3H3,(H,23,25)/t14-,19-/m1/s1; Key:ZQONRMXCBQXYCK-AUUYWEPGSA-N

Lysergic acid 3-pentylamide (LSP), also known as N-(3-pentyl)lysergamide, is an analogue of LSD originally researched by David E. Nichols and colleagues at Purdue University. It has similar binding affinity to LSD itself as both a 5-HT_{1A} and 5-HT_{2A} agonist, and produces similar behavioral and physiological responses in animals with only slightly lower potency than LSD. Other isomers of this compound have also been explored, with the 1-pentylamide being around 75% the potency of LSD, while the (R)-2-pentylamide shows similar 5-HT_{2A} binding affinity to LSD in vitro but has only around half the potency of LSD in producing drug-appropriate responding in mice, and the (S)-2-pentylamide is inactive.

== See also ==
- Substituted lysergamide
- Cepentil
- Lysergic acid 2-butylamide (LSB)
- Lysergic acid 2-pentylamide (2-LSP)
- MiPLA
- Methylergometrine
