= Ethylpropyllysergamide =

EPLA

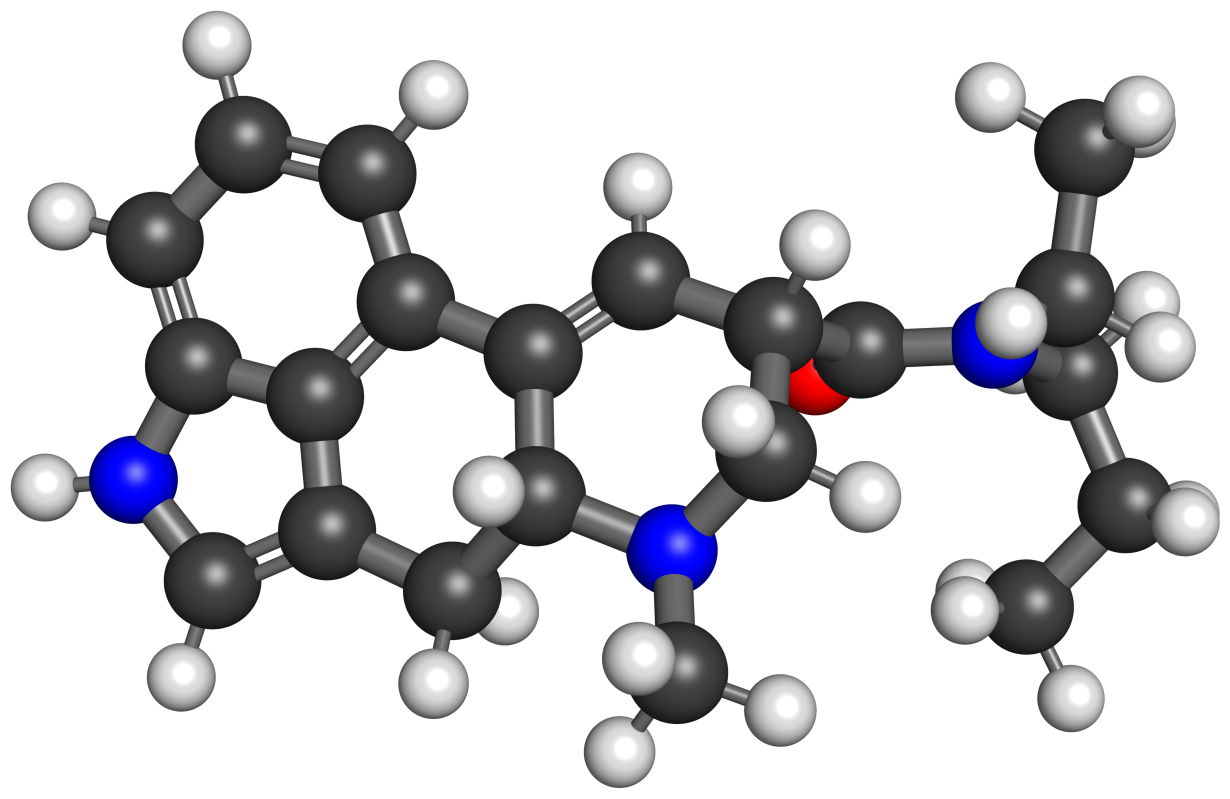

Clinical data
- Other names: N-Ethyl-N-propyllysergamide; Ethylpropyllysergamide; EPLA; Lysergic acid ethylpropylamide; LEP; LEP-57; N-Ethyl-6-methyl-N-propyl-9,10-didehydroergoline-8β-carboxamide
- Routes of administration: Oral
- Drug class: Serotonin receptor modulator; Serotonin 5-HT_{2A} receptor agonist; Serotonergic psychedelic; Hallucinogen
- ATC code: None

Identifiers
- IUPAC name: (6aR,9R)-N-ethyl-7-methyl-N-propyl-4,6,6a,7,8,9-hexahydroindolo[4,3-fg]quinoline-9-carboxamide
- PubChem CID: 166935919

Chemical and physical data
- Formula: C_{21}H_{27}N_{3}O
- Molar mass: 337.467 g·mol^{−1}
- 3D model (JSmol): Interactive image
- SMILES: CCCN(C(=O)[C@H]1CN(C)[C@H]2C(=C1)c1cccc3c1c(C2)c[nH]3)CC
- InChI: InChI=1S/C21H27N3O/c1-4-9-24(5-2)21(25)15-10-17-16-7-6-8-18-20(16)14(12-22-18)11-19(17)23(3)13-15/h6-8,10,12,15,19,22H,4-5,9,11,13H2,1-3H3/t15-,19-/m1/s1; Key:LRVSYILBFXYJOP-DNVCBOLYSA-N

N-Ethyl-N-propyllysergamide (EPLA), also known as lysergic acid ethylpropylamide (LEP or LEP-57), is a psychedelic drug of the lysergamide family related to lysergic acid diethylamide (LSD). It is the analogue of LSD in which the amide group has one ethyl group and one propyl group instead of two ethyl groups.

The drug shows affinity for serotonin receptors and acts as a serotonin 5-HT_{2A} receptor agonist similarly to LSD. EPLA has about one-third of the potency of LSD in producing psychedelic effects in humans. Its exact dose has not been reported.

EPLA was first described in the scientific literature by at least 1959. It was reportedly encountered as a designer drug by the 1990s.

== See also ==
- Substituted lysergamide
- Lysergic acid methylpropylamide (LAMPA)
- Methylisopropyllysergamide (MiPLA)
- Ethylcyclopropyllysergamide (EcPLA)
- Ethylisopropyllysergamide (EiPLA)
- Lysergic acid dimethylamide (DAM-57)
- Lysergic acid dipropylamide (DPL)
- Lysergic acid diallylamide (DAL)
