= Lysergic acid methylamide =

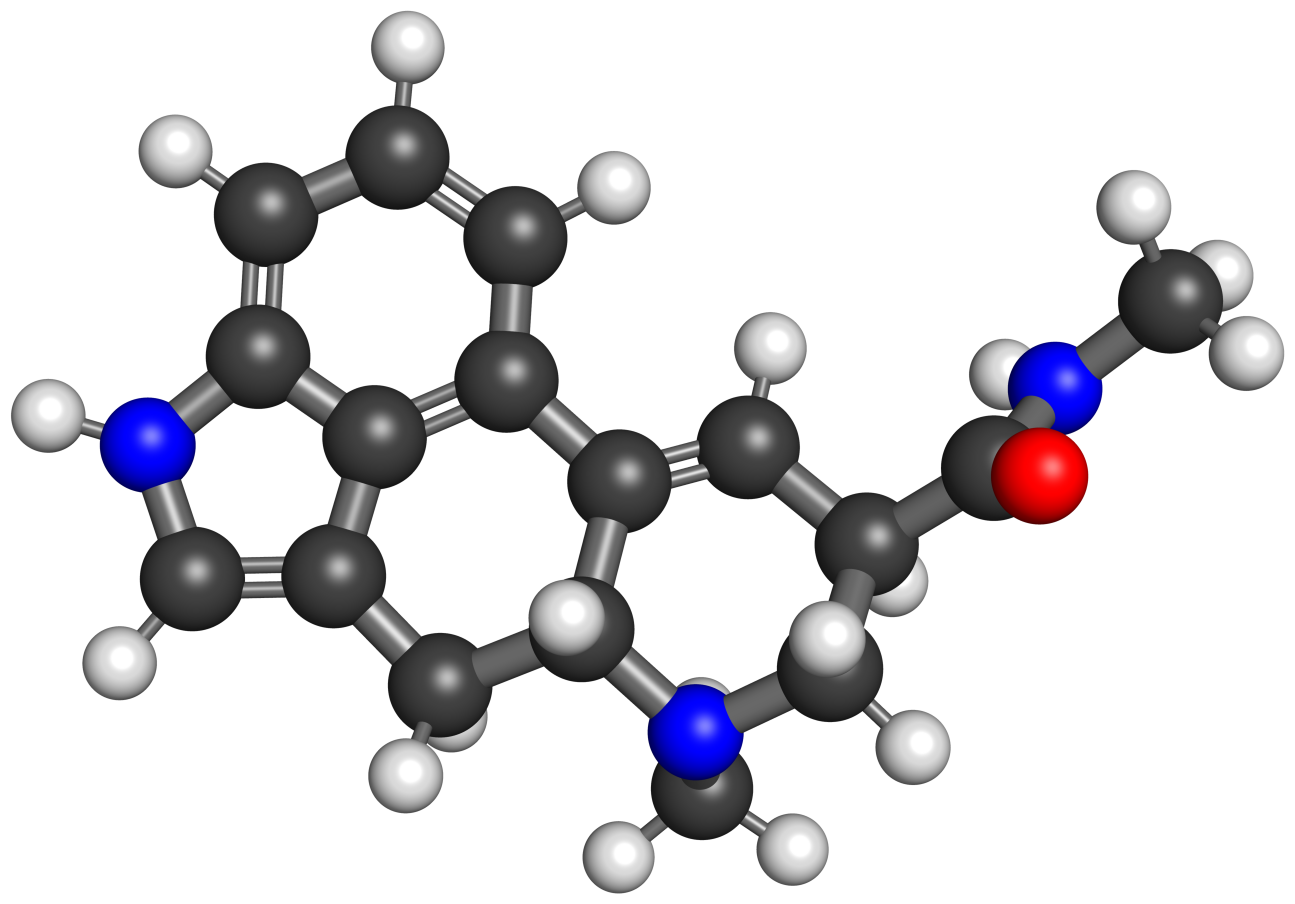

Clinical data
- Other names: Lysergic acid methylamide; LAM; Lysergic acid monomethylamide; LA-methylamide; LA-monomethylamide; N-Methyllysergamide; NM-LA; N-Methyl-LSA; N-Methylergine; N,6-Dimethyl-9,10-didehydroergoline-8β-carboxamide
- Routes of administration: Oral
- Drug class: Serotonin receptor modulator
- ATC code: None

Identifiers
- IUPAC name: (6aR,9R)-N,7-dimethyl-6,6a,8,9-tetrahydro-4H-indolo[4,3-fg]quinoline-9-carboxamide
- CAS Number: 50485-06-8
- PubChem CID: 56841679
- ChemSpider: 21161369
- CompTox Dashboard (EPA): DTXSID50198507

Chemical and physical data
- Formula: C_{17}H_{19}N_{3}O
- Molar mass: 281.359 g·mol^{−1}
- 3D model (JSmol): Interactive image
- SMILES: CNC(=O)[C@H]1CN([C@@H]2CC3=CNC4=CC=CC(=C34)C2=C1)C
- InChI: InChI=1S/C17H19N3O/c1-18-17(21)11-6-13-12-4-3-5-14-16(12)10(8-19-14)7-15(13)20(2)9-11/h3-6,8,11,15,19H,7,9H2,1-2H3,(H,18,21)/t11-,15-/m1/s1; Key:NINBUXQQTOVMAB-IAQYHMDHSA-N

Lysergic acid methylamide (LAM), also known as N-methyllysergamide (NM-LA), is a serotonin receptor modulator of the lysergamide family related to the psychedelic drug lysergic acid diethylamide (LSD). It is the N-methyl derivative of ergine (lysergic acid amide; LSA) and the analogue of LSD in which the N,N-diethyl groups have been replaced with one N-methyl group.

The drug is active in humans at a dose of approximately 500 μg and has roughly 20% of the potency of LSD as a drug. However, it has been said to produce autonomic effects but to produce no psychoactive or hallucinogenic effects at this dose. The drug has about 6.3% of the antiserotonergic potency of LSD in the isolated rat uterus in vitro.

LAM was first described in the scientific literature by Albert Hofmann and colleagues by 1955.

== See also ==
- Substituted lysergamide
- Lysergic acid amide (LSA; ergine)
- Lysergic acid ethylamide (LAE-32)
- Lysergic acid dimethylamide (DAM-57)
