= Propyl group =

Chemical group (–C3H7) derived from propane

From left to right: the two isomeric groups propyl and 1-methylethyl (iPr or isopropyl), and the non-isomeric cyclopropyl group.

In organic chemistry, a propyl group is a three-carbon alkyl substituent with chemical formula −CH_{2}CH_{2}CH_{3} for the linear form. This substituent form is obtained by removing one hydrogen atom attached to the terminal carbon of propane. A propyl substituent is often represented in organic chemistry with the symbol Pr (not to be confused with the element praseodymium).

An isomeric form of propyl is obtained by moving the point of attachment from a terminal carbon atom to the central carbon atom, named isopropyl or 1-methylethyl. To maintain four substituents on each carbon atom, one hydrogen atom has to be moved from the middle carbon atom to the carbon atom which served as attachment point in the n-propyl variant, written as −CH(CH_{3})_{2}.

Linear propyl is sometimes termed normal and hence written with a prefix n- (i.e., n-propyl), as the absence of the prefix n- does not indicate which attachment point is chosen, i.e. absence of prefix does not automatically exclude the possibility of it being the branched version (i.e. i-propyl or isopropyl). In addition, there is a third, cyclic, form called cyclopropyl, or c-propyl. It is not isomeric with the other two forms, having a different chemical formula (−C_{3}H_{5} vs −C_{3}H_{7}), not just a different connectivity of the atoms.

== Examples ==
n-Propyl acetate is an ester which has the n-propyl group attached to the oxygen atom of the acetate group.

Chemical structure of propyl acetate.

=== Other examples ===
- Isopropyl alcohol
- Isopropylamine
