= C20H25N3O2 =

The molecular formula C_{20}H_{25}N_{3}O_{2} (molar mass: 339.43 g/mol, exact mass: 339.1947 u) may refer to:

- Trilyakine
  - 3-Hydroxy-LSD
  - 12-Hydroxy-LSD
  - 13-Hydroxy-LSD
  - 14-Hydroxy-LSD
- 2-Oxo-LSD
- Lysergic acid ethyl-2-hydroxyethylamide
- Methylergometrine, or methylergonovine
- Propisergide
- WAY-317,538 (SEN-12333)
