= C21H27N3O2 =

The molecular formula C_{21}H_{27}N_{3}O_{2} (molar mass: 353.47 g/mol) may refer to:

- 1-Hydroxymethyl-LSD
- Methoxy-LSD
  - 12-Methoxy-LSD
  - 13-Methoxy-LSD
  - 14-Methoxy-LSD
- Methysergide
- LA-MeO
