= Hydroxy-LSD =

Hydroxy-LSD, also known as OH-LSD or HO-LSD, may refer to:

- 3-Hydroxy-LSD
- 12-Hydroxy-LSD
- 13-Hydroxy-LSD
- 14-Hydroxy-LSD
- Lysergic acid ethyl-2-hydroxyethylamide (LEO)

== See also ==
- Methoxy-LSD
- Seco-LSD
- 1-Hydroxymethyl-LSD (OML-632)
