= Methoxy-LSD =

Methoxy-LSD, also known as OMe-LSD or MeO-LSD, may refer to:

- 12-Methoxy-LSD
- 13-Methoxy-LSD
- 14-Methoxy-LSD
- LA-MeO

== See also ==
- Hydroxy-LSD
- Seco-LSD
