= A-412997 =

Chemical compound

Identifiers
- IUPAC name: N-(3-methylphenyl)-2-(4-pyridin-2-ylpiperidin-1-yl)acetamide
- CAS Number: 630116-49-3 1347744-96-0 (di‑hydrochloride)
- PubChem CID: 10425450
- IUPHAR/BPS: 3301
- ChemSpider: 8600878
- UNII: RWL9H93ARB
- ChEMBL: ChEMBL375596
- CompTox Dashboard (EPA): DTXSID70212234

Chemical and physical data
- Formula: C_{19}H_{23}N_{3}O
- Molar mass: 309.413 g·mol^{−1}
- 3D model (JSmol): Interactive image
- SMILES: CC1=CC(NC(CN2CCC(C3=CC=CC=N3)CC2)=O)=CC=C1
- InChI: InChI=1S/C19H23N3O/c1-15-5-4-6-17(13-15)21-19(23)14-22-11-8-16(9-12-22)18-7-2-3-10-20-18/h2-7,10,13,16H,8-9,11-12,14H2,1H3,(H,21,23); Key:JFCDMGGMCUKHST-UHFFFAOYSA-N

A-412,997 is a drug which acts as a dopamine agonist that is used in scientific research. It is the first drug developed that is a highly selective agonist for the D_{4} subtype, with significantly improved selectivity over older D_{4}-preferring compounds such as PD-168,077 and CP-226,269. In animal tests it improved cognitive performance in rats to a similar extent as methylphenidate, but without producing place preference or other signs of abuse liability. Also unlike other dopamine agonists, selective D_{4} agonists do not cause side effects such as sedation and nausea, and so might have advantages over older dopamine agonist drugs.
