= C19H23N3O =

The molecular formula C_{19}H_{23}N_{3}O (molar mass: 309.40 g/mol, exact mass: 309.1841 u) may refer to:

- A-412,997
- Benzydamine
- MLA-74
- Nor-LSD
- LME-54
- CA7 (drug)
- Lysergic acid propylamide
- IPLA
