= C18H19ClN4 =

The molecular formula C_{18}H_{19}ClN_{4} (molar mass: 326.82 g/mol, exact mass: 326.1298 u) may refer to:

- Clozapine
- L-745,870
