= 14-Methoxy-LSD =

Clinical data
- Other names: 14-Methoxylysergic acid diethylamide; 14-OMe-LSD; 14-MeO-LSD; N,N-Diethyl-14-methoxy-6-methyl-9,10-didehydroergoline-8β-carboxamide
- ATC code: None

Identifiers
- IUPAC name: N,N-diethyl-2-methoxy-7-methyl-6,6a,8,9-tetrahydro-4H-indolo[4,3-fg]quinoline-9-carboxamide

Chemical and physical data
- Formula: C_{21}H_{27}N_{3}O_{2}
- Molar mass: 353.466 g·mol^{−1}
- 3D model (JSmol): Interactive image
- SMILES: O=C([C@@]1C=C2C3C=CC(OC)=C4C=3C(=CN4[H])C[C@@]2([H])N(C)C1)N(CC)CC
- InChI: InChI=1S/C21H26N3O2/c1-5-24(6-2)21(25)14-9-16-15-7-8-18(26-4)20-19(15)13(11-22-20)10-17(16)23(3)12-14/h7-9,11,17,22H,5-6,10,12H2,1-4H3/t17-/m1/s1; Key:RLYRADCNGTXJDX-QGZVFWFLSA-N

14-Methoxy-LSD is a lysergamide related to lysergic acid diethylamide (LSD). It is the derivative of LSD with a methoxy group at the 14 position and is the O-methyl ether of 14-hydroxy-LSD. Unlike 13-hydroxy-LSD and 13-methoxy-LSD and other related compounds like 12-hydroxy-LSD and 12-methoxy-LSD, 14-hydroxy-LSD and 14-methoxy-LSD did not produce LSD-like electroencephalogram (EEG) changes in rabbits. 14-Methoxy-LSD was first described in the scientific literature by 1979.

== See also ==
- Substituted lysergamide
- 14-Hydroxy-LSD
- 14-Methyl-LSD
- 13-Methoxy-LSD
- 12-Methoxy-LSD
- LA-MeO
- 7-MeO-DMT
