= C17H19N3 =

The molecular formula C_{17}H_{19}N_{3} (molar mass : 265.35 g/mol) may refer to:

- Acridine orange
- Delergotrile
- Antazoline
- Esmirtazapine
- Mirtazapine
