= Fair Warning (Connelly novel) =

2020 novel by Michael Connelly

- Hardcover edition
- Author: Michael Connelly
- Language: English
- Series: Jack McEvoy
- Release number: 3
- Genre: Crime, mystery, thriller
- Publisher: Little, Brown and Company
- Publication date: May 26, 2020
- Publication place: United States
- Media type: Print (hardback & paperback)
- Pages: 399
- ISBN: 978-0-316-53942-5
- Preceded by: The Scarecrow

Fair Warning is a crime thriller novel, and the thirty-fourth novel by American author Michael Connelly. It is the third standalone novel featuring Jack McEvoy, a Los Angeles investigative reporter for the consumer watchdog news service Fair Warning, as well as former FBI agent Rachel Walling.

The book was published on May 26, 2020 by Little, Brown and Company. The novel is a sequel to the events in Connelly's 2009 book The Scarecrow. Themes explored in the book include the decline of investigative journalism and the print-newspaper, the rise of fake news, the misogynistic incel movement, and the dangers of trafficking in DNA sequence data by an industry having no government oversight or regulations.

The story is told in first-person narrative from the perspective of McEvoy, however, it occasionally swaps to third-person when following antagonists Marshall Hammond and The Shrike. Two chapters are stylized as news articles.

McEvoy's employer and its editor Myron Levin are both based on the real-life news service FairWarning, with Levin as its editor. FairWarning dissolved in February 2021.

== Plot ==
A drunk woman drives home with an unknown man. They enter her apartment and have sex, before he places her in a headlock and squeezes her neck. As she loses consciousness, he tells her that people call him "The Shrike."

Reporter Jack McEvoy works for the consumer watchdog news service Fair Warning in Los Angeles. Two LAPD detectives stop him outside his apartment and inform him that Tina Portrero, a woman he had a one-night stand with several months earlier, was found dead in her shower. Her neck injury, atlanto-occipital dislocation, indicates that her death was staged as an accident. The detectives question Jack and collect his DNA.

Jack posts on a forum for coroners seeking cases of recent AOD deaths. He finds that the victims had submitted DNA samples to an ancestry website called GT23. He contacts former FBI agent Rachel Walling, who proposes that the victims may share a history of sex addiction. Rachel joins his inquiries.

Jack learns that GT23 sold DNA samples to Orange Nano. He plans to interview William Orton, a board member and former professor accused of rape, but the detectives arrest Jack for obstruction before he can leave his apartment. Meanwhile, laboratory technician Marshall Hammond learns of Jack's case through the police system. He and his partner Roger Vogel attend Jack's court hearing and watch as he is released.

Jack enlists Fair Warning writer Emily Atwater. She finds that Hammond operates a private DNA analysis business and buys female DNA exclusively from Orange Nano. A masked intruder breaks into Hammond's home and steals profiles of women carrying the DRD4 gene. The intruder identifies himself as The Shrike and kills Hammond by breaking his neck, then stages the death as suicide.

Jack goes straight to Hammond's house with Rachel to find him hanging. Before calling the police, they print copies of the women's profiles and conceal it in Jack's car. With their editor Myron Levin, Jack and Emily deduce that Hammond was running an illicit website where he sold the information of women with the DRD4 gene to incels who intended to take advantage of them, and that a user on the site, The Shrike, was instead murdering them. They begin the search for Hammond's partner and share some of their findings with the FBI.

The Shrike kills a man he mistakes for Vogel, breaking his neck and throwing him from a parking garage. After the FBI supplies Vogel's identity, Jack, Emily, and Rachel visit him at work. Vogel claims he knows how to locate The Shrike, but the killer runs him over and escapes before the FBI can intervene. He destroys the remaining evidence and leaves Los Angeles.

Months later, Fair Warning's staff publish books and host podcasts about the case. Jack and Rachel notice a man watching her in a bar and report him to the FBI. They later lure him into a confrontation and shoot him when he draws a gun, suspecting he intends to kill Rachel on behalf of The Shrike.

After another few months later, Jack senses someone in the back of his car after a near collision. He realizes The Shrike is hiding there and alerts Rachel by text. During their attempt to capture the killer, traffic delays Jack. The Shrike puts an arm around his neck, forcing Jack to swerve at high speed. The car overturns repeatedly, throwing The Shrike from the window and crushing him beneath the vehicle. Jack survives, but The Shrike's identity remains unknown.

After recovering, Jack visits Rachel at her workplace and proposes that they investigate crimes together rather than simply report them. Disappointed by the lack of justice in his profession, he wants to pursue cases directly. Rachel accepts his offer.

== Reception ==
Barry Forshaw wrote in the Financial Times, "Connelly is an astute commentator on American society, notably the prevalence of fake news filtering from the highest political echelons down to every stratum of society." Critic Marilyn Stasio wrote in The New York Times, "Connelly is in terrific form here, applying genre conventions to the real-life dangers inherent in the commercial marketing of genetics research." Sandra Dallas wrote in the Denver Post that the novel "sheds light on the murky billion-dollar world of DNA testing.... [which has] little in the way of oversight or enforcement. Labs are licensed but essentially operate on their own. All that makes the subject ripe for a good mystery. And Michael Connelly is just the guy to write it."
