= C19H20ClN3 =

The molecular formula C_{19}H_{20}ClN_{3} (molar mass: 325.84 g/mol) may refer to:

- Clemizole
- Lu 38-012
