= 13-Methoxy-LSD =

Clinical data
- Other names: 13-Methoxylysergic acid diethylamide; 13-OMe-LSD; 13-MeO-LSD; N,N-Diethyl-13-methoxy-6-methyl-9,10-didehydroergoline-8β-carboxamide
- ATC code: None

Identifiers
- IUPAC name: N,N-diethyl-2-methoxy-7-methyl-6,6a,8,9-tetrahydro-4H-indolo[4,3-fg]quinoline-9-carboxamide
- PubChem CID: 156727595

Chemical and physical data
- Formula: C_{21}H_{27}N_{3}O_{2}
- Molar mass: 353.466 g·mol^{−1}
- 3D model (JSmol): Interactive image
- SMILES: CCN(CC)C(=O)C1CN(C2CC3=CNC4=CC(=CC(=C34)C2=C1)OC)C
- InChI: InChI=1S/C21H27N3O2/c1-5-24(6-2)21(25)14-7-16-17-9-15(26-4)10-18-20(17)13(11-22-18)8-19(16)23(3)12-14/h7,9-11,14,19,22H,5-6,8,12H2,1-4H3; Key:NFQMBWPVBDJETC-UHFFFAOYSA-N

13-Methoxy-LSD is a lysergamide related to lysergic acid diethylamide (LSD). It is the derivative of LSD with a methoxy group at the 13 position and is the O-methyl ether of 13-hydroxy-LSD. Similarly to 13-hydroxy-LSD and other related compounds like 12-hydroxy-LSD and 12-methoxy-LSD, 13-methoxy-LSD has been reported to produce LSD-like electroencephalogram (EEG) changes in rabbits. Conversely, 14-methoxy-LSD was inactive. 13-Methoxy-LSD was first described in the scientific literature by 1979.

== See also ==
- Substituted lysergamide
- 13-Hydroxy-LSD
- 12-Methoxy-LSD
- 14-Methoxy-LSD
- LA-MeO
- 6-MeO-DMT
