= Ro10-5824 =

Chemical compound

Identifiers
- IUPAC name: 2-methyl-5-[(4-phenyl-3,6-dihydro-2H-pyridin-1-yl)methyl]pyrimidin-4-amine
- CAS Number: 189744-46-5
- PubChem CID: 16759175
- ChemSpider: 14016802
- UNII: 8X35VUU4YY
- ChEMBL: ChEMBL1616116
- CompTox Dashboard (EPA): DTXSID501029525

Chemical and physical data
- Formula: C_{17}H_{20}N_{4}
- Molar mass: 280.375 g·mol^{−1}
- 3D model (JSmol): Interactive image
- SMILES: c3ccccc3C(=CC2)CCN2Cc1cnc(C)nc1N
- InChI: InChI=1S/C17H20N4/c1-13-19-11-16(17(18)20-13)12-21-9-7-15(8-10-21)14-5-3-2-4-6-14/h2-7,11H,8-10,12H2,1H3,(H2,18,19,20); Key:KABDATZAOUSYES-UHFFFAOYSA-N

Ro10-5824 is a drug which acts as a dopamine receptor partial agonist selective for the D_{4} subtype, and has nootropic effects in animal studies.
