= The Scarecrow (Connelly novel) =

2009 novel by Michael Connelly

- First edition
- Author: Michael Connelly
- Language: English
- Series: Jack McEvoy
- Release number: 2
- Genre: Crime, mystery, thriller
- Publisher: Little, Brown and Company
- Publication date: May 12, 2009 (United Kingdom and Ireland); May 26, 2009 (United States and Canada)
- Publication place: United States
- Media type: Print (hardback & paperback)
- Pages: 419
- ISBN: 978-0-316-16630-0
- OCLC: 298209030
- Dewey Decimal: 813/.54 22
- LC Class: PS3553.O51165 S27 2009
- Preceded by: The Poet
- Followed by: Fair Warning

The Scarecrow is a crime thriller novel, and the twentieth novel by American author Michael Connelly and features the second whose main character is Jack McEvoy, a reporter now living in Los Angeles, and FBI agent Rachel Walling. As a result, the novel is a sequel to the events in Connelly's 1996 book The Poet, although another Connelly novel, The Narrows, was published in 2004 as the "official" sequel to The Poet. The book was published in the United Kingdom and Ireland on May 12, 2009, and in the United States and Canada on May 26, 2009 by Little, Brown and Company.

Although McEvoy has made two subsequent appearances in Connelly's Harry Bosch novels (A Darkness More Than Night and The Brass Verdict), and Walling has appeared in three such novels (The Narrows, Echo Park and The Overlook), this was their first appearance together since The Poet.

== Plot ==
Jack McEvoy, a crime reporter at the Los Angeles Times, faces a layoff and two weeks to train his replacement, Angela Cook. Hoping to finish his career with a major article, he examines the case of Alonzo Winslow, a teenager accused of raping and murdering a stripper in Santa Monica. Jack finds that Alonzo confessed only to stealing the car in which the victim was found.

Angela's online research into similar murders takes her to a website created by Wesley Carver, an MIT graduate employed as chief security officer at a server farm in Mesa, Arizona. Carver is the real murderer. After accessing Angela's email, he learns that Jack plans to visit Las Vegas and arranges a company assignment in Los Angeles.

Jack soon finds his credit cards and cell phone disabled. He buys a prepaid phone and travels to Ely State Prison, carrying evidence that may free a man convicted of a similar murder in Las Vegas. During the drive across on the loneliest road in America, he contacts his former girlfriend, FBI agent Rachel Walling, about a possible serial killer. At a hotel near the prison, Jack encounters a cowboy with distinctive sideburns. Rachel arrives unexpectedly, having recognized a pattern between Jack's discoveries and his electronic troubles. They suspect the cowboy is the murderer.

Jack then learns that Angela has disappeared. He and Rachel return to Los Angeles, where they find Angela dead beneath Jack's bed. Her murder resembles the earlier killings, which targeted exotic dancers subjected to sexual abuse while wearing leg braces. The FBI clears Jack, and evidence helps free both Alonzo and the Las Vegas prisoner. Investigators trace a website associated with the murders to Carver's server farm.

Jack discovers that the victims' law firms used Carver's services to host their websites, giving him access to private legal records. He and Rachel visit the facility under false pretenses and speak with Carver. Their inquiries take them to the home of Freddie Stone, Carver's assistant, whom they identify as the cowboy. They find evidence tying Stone to the murders and summon the FBI. Rachel's contribution helps her regain her position.

Before Jack leaves Los Angeles, Stone kidnaps Rachel. Jack rescues her from a laundry bin and kills Stone during a fight atop a building. The FBI believes Stone and another murderer were responsible for the deaths, while evidence implicates Stone and a missing company executive.

The Times offers Jack his job back, but he declines and accepts a two-book publishing deal. A photograph from The Wizard of Oz reminds him that the victims' method of suffocation resembles a scarecrow's head. He rushes to Arizona to warn Rachel, only to realize that a webcam near their meeting place may have exposed their conversation to Carver.

Carver attacks the FBI agents, intending to kill them and fake his own death. Jack recognizes his plan, and Rachel shoots Carver in the head, leaving him in a coma. Later research shows that Carver's mother was an exotic dancer who resembled the victims and required leg braces. Carver remains under medical supervision, isolated and unconscious.
