= Lu 38-012 =

Clinical data
- Other names: LU-38012; LU38012
- Drug class: Dopamine D_{4} receptor antagonist
- ATC code: None

Identifiers
- IUPAC name: 5-[[4-(4-chlorophenyl)piperazin-1-yl]methyl]-1H-indole
- PubChem CID: 9880381
- ChemSpider: 8056057

Chemical and physical data
- Formula: C_{19}H_{20}ClN_{3}
- Molar mass: 325.84 g·mol^{−1}
- 3D model (JSmol): Interactive image
- SMILES: C1CN(CCN1CC2=CC3=C(C=C2)NC=C3)C4=CC=C(C=C4)Cl
- InChI: InChI=1S/C19H20ClN3/c20-17-2-4-18(5-3-17)23-11-9-22(10-12-23)14-15-1-6-19-16(13-15)7-8-21-19/h1-8,13,21H,9-12,14H2; Key:LFXXDQVEFFXFSD-UHFFFAOYSA-N

Lu 38-012 is a potent and selective dopamine D_{4} receptor antagonist which has been used in scientific research. It has an affinity (K_{i}) for the dopamine D_{4.2} receptor of 7.5 nM and showed 16-fold selectivity for this receptor over the dopamine D_{2S} receptor (K_{i} = 120 nM). The drug had relatively little affinity for other dopamine receptors. Affinities at other targets have also been reported. The drug produces hypolocomotion and reverses dextroamphetamine- and phencyclidine (PCP)-induced hyperlocomotion without producing catalepsy in rodents. Lu 38-012 partially substituted for clozapine in drug discrimination tests in rodents. It was developed by Lundbeck and was first described in the scientific literature by 2006.

== See also ==
- Substituted phenylpiperazine
- Lu 35-138
- Sonepiprazole
