= Dopamine receptor D4 =

Protein-coding gene in the species Homo sapiens

DRD4

Identifiers
- Aliases: DRD4, D4DR, dopamine receptor D4
- External IDs: OMIM: 126452; MGI: 94926; GeneCards: DRD4

Gene location (Human)
Chr.	Chromosome 11 (human)
Band	11p15.5	Start	637,269 bp
Band	11p15.5	End	640,706 bp

Gene location (Mouse)
Chr.	Chromosome 7 (mouse)
Band	7 F5|7 86.6 cM	Start	140,871,919 bp
Band	7 F5|7 86.6 cM	End	140,876,377 bp
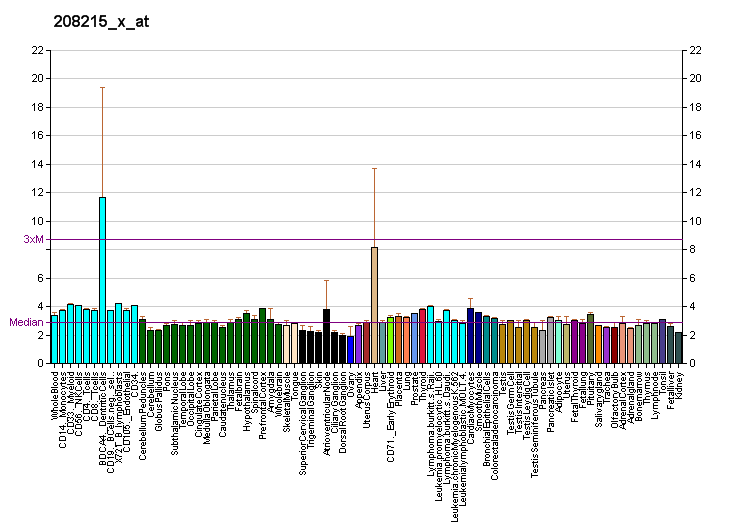
RNA expression pattern
Bgee	Human / Mouse (ortholog); Top expressed in: testicle; right uterine tube; pituitary gland; right hemisphere of cerebellum; left ovary; anterior pituitary; right ovary; primary visual cortex; sural nerve; body of uterus / Top expressed in: neural layer of retina; retinal pigment epithelium; epithelium of lens; decidua; seminiferous tubule; embryo; gastrula; embryo; iris; cumulus cell; More reference expression data
BioGPS	More reference expression data
Gene ontology
Molecular function	signal transducer activity; potassium channel regulator activity; SH3 domain binding; identical protein binding; dopamine neurotransmitter receptor activity; G protein-coupled receptor activity; protein binding; dopamine binding; dopamine neurotransmitter receptor activity, coupled via Gi/Go; epinephrine binding; norepinephrine binding; metal ion binding; G protein-coupled serotonin receptor activity; neurotransmitter receptor activity
Cellular component	integral component of membrane; integral component of plasma membrane; membrane; plasma membrane; postsynapse; glutamatergic synapse; dendrite
Biological process	response to amphetamine; rhythmic process; arachidonic acid secretion; regulation of circadian rhythm; positive regulation of dopamine uptake involved in synaptic transmission; signal transduction; fear response; dopamine metabolic process; behavioral response to ethanol; behavioral response to cocaine; positive regulation of sodium:proton antiporter activity; cellular calcium ion homeostasis; positive regulation of kinase activity; adult locomotory behavior; inhibitory postsynaptic potential; negative regulation of protein secretion; social behavior; negative regulation of voltage-gated calcium channel activity; regulation of dopamine metabolic process; response to histamine; behavioral fear response; dopamine receptor signaling pathway; G protein-coupled receptor signaling pathway; adenylate cyclase-inhibiting dopamine receptor signaling pathway; regulation of postsynaptic neurotransmitter receptor internalization; G protein-coupled receptor signaling pathway, coupled to cyclic nucleotide second messenger; chemical synaptic transmission; G protein-coupled serotonin receptor signaling pathway
Sources:Amigo / QuickGO
Orthologs
Databases	NCBI: entry; OMA: entry
Species	Human	Mouse
Entrez	1815	13491
Ensembl	ENSG00000069696; ENSG00000276825	ENSMUSG00000025496
UniProt	P21917	P51436
RefSeq (mRNA)	NM_000797	NM_007878
RefSeq (protein)	NP_000788	NP_031904
Location (UCSC)	Chr 11: 0.64 – 0.64 Mb	Chr 7: 140.87 – 140.88 Mb
PubMed search
- Wikidata
View/Edit Human	View/Edit Mouse

The dopamine receptor D_{4} is a dopamine D2-like G protein-coupled receptor encoded by the DRD4 gene on chromosome 11 at 11p15.5.

Like other D_{2}-like receptors, the D_{4} receptor is activated by dopamine and inhibits adenylate cyclase, reducing intracellular levels of cyclic AMP.

The DRD4 gene contains several polymorphisms, including a variable number tandem repeat (VNTR) in exon 3. These variants have been studied for associations with attention deficit hyperactivity disorder (ADHD), novelty seeking, and cognitive development.

== Gene ==
=== Polymorphisms ===
The human protein is coded by the DRD4 on chromosome 11 located in 11p15.5.

There are slight variations (mutations/polymorphisms) in the human gene:

- A 48-base pair VNTR in exon 3
- C-521T in the promoter
- 13-base pair deletion of bases 235 to 247 in exon 1
- 12 base pair repeat in exon 1
- Val194Gly
- A polymorphic tandem duplication of 48 bp

The 48-base pair variable number tandem repeat (VNTR) in exon 3 ranges from 2 to 11 repeats. The 7-repeat (7R) variant of DRD4 is known as DRD4-7R. Alleles with 6 to 10 repeats are described as "long" alleles.

=== Population variation and evolution ===
Allele frequencies vary greatly between populations; for example, the 7-repeat variant is more frequent in the Americas than in Asia.

The 48-base pair VNTR has been studied in relation to human evolution and behavioral variation across cultures. The 7R allele appears to have been selected for about 40,000 years ago. In 1999, Chen and colleagues observed that populations that had migrated farther during the period from 30,000 to 1,000 years ago had higher frequencies of 7R/long alleles. They also reported higher frequencies of 7R alleles in nomadic populations than in sedentary populations.

A subsequent study reported better health status among nomadic Ariaal men carrying 7R alleles, but slightly poorer health among carriers in recently sedentary Ariaal populations.

== Structure ==
The structure of DRD4 has been reported in complex with the antipsychotic drug nemonapride.

== Function ==
=== Signaling ===
As with other dopamine receptor subtypes, the D_{4} receptor is activated by the neurotransmitter dopamine. The D_{4} receptor belongs to the D_{2}-like family. Activation inhibits the enzyme adenylate cyclase, thereby reducing the intracellular concentration of the second messenger cyclic AMP.

Dopamine is more potent at D_{4} receptor variants with 2 or 7 repeats than at the variant with 4 repeats. The 7-repeat variant has also been reported to respond less strongly to dopamine.

=== Cognition ===
Adults and children with the DRD4 7-repeat polymorphism show variations in auditory-evoked gamma oscillations, which may be related to attention processing.

Several studies have shown that agonists that activate the D4 receptor increase working memory performance and fear acquisition in monkeys and rodents according to a U-shaped dose response curve. However, antagonists of the D4 receptor reverse stress-induced or drug-induced working memory deficits. Gamma oscillations, which may be correlated with cognitive processing, can be increased by D4R agonists, but are not significantly reduced by D4R antagonists.

== Pharmacology ==
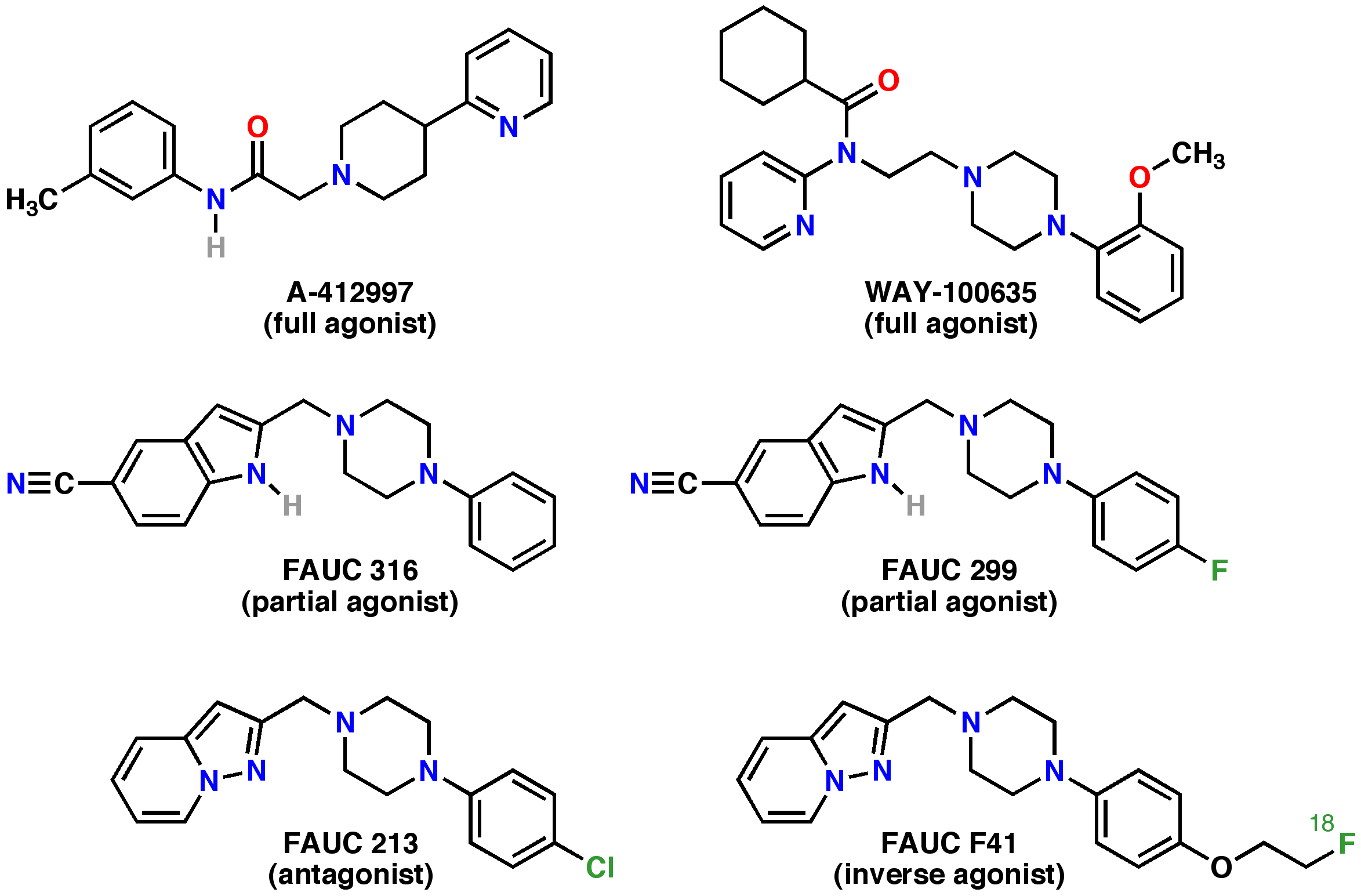
Chemical structures of representative D_{4}-preferring ligands.

=== Agonists ===
- 13-Hydroxy-LSD – EC_{50} = 36 pM, among the most potent known
- 14-Hydroxy-LSD – EC_{50} = 1.6 nM
- LSD – EC_{50} = 14 nM, 380-fold weaker than 13-hydroxy-LSD
- WAY-100635: potent full agonist, with 5-HT_{1A} antagonistic component
- A-412,997: full agonist, > 100-fold selective over a panel of seventy different receptors and ion channels
- ABT-724 - developed for treatment of erectile dysfunction
- ABT-670 - better oral bioavailability than ABT-724
- FAUC 316: partial agonist, > 8600-fold selective over other dopamine receptor subtypes
- FAUC 299: partial agonist
- F-15063: antipsychotic with partial D4 agonism
- (E)-1-aryl-3-(4-pyridinepiperazin-1-yl)propanone oximes
- PIP3EA: partial agonist
- Flibanserin - partial agonist
- PD-168,077 - D_{4} selective but also binds to α1A, α2C and 5HT_{1A}
- CP-226,269 - D_{4} selective but also binds to D_{2}, D_{3}, α2A, α2C and 5HT_{1A}
- Ro10-5824 – partial agonist
- Roxindole – D_{4} selective but also D_{2} and D_{3} autoreceptor agonist, 5HT_{1A} receptor agonist, serotonin reuptake inhibitor)
- Apomorphine – D_{4} selective but also D_{2} and D_{3} agonist, α-adrenergic and serotonergic weak antagonist
- Nuciferine - D_{4} full selective but also partial D_{2} and D_{5} agonist

=== Antagonists ===
- A-381393: potent, subtype selective antagonist (>2700-fold)
- FAUC 213
- L-745,870
- L-750,667
- Lu 35-138
- Lu 38-012
- ML398
- S 18126 - also σ_{1} affinity
- Sonepiprazole
- Fananserin – mixed 5-HT_{2A} / D_{4} antagonist
- Buspirone, an anxiolytic
- Clozapine - atypical antipsychotic with relative D4 and 5HT2A selectivity over D2
- Olanzapine - an atypical antipsychotic
- Pipamperone - sedative antipsychotic with relative D4 and 5HT2A selectivity over D2

=== Inverse agonists ===
- FAUC F41: inverse agonist, subtype selectivity of more than 3 orders of magnitude over D_{2} and D_{3}

== Behavioral and developmental associations ==
=== Novelty seeking ===
Despite early findings of an association between the DRD4 48bp VNTR and novelty seeking (a normal characteristic of exploratory and excitable people), a 2008 meta-analysis compared 36 published studies of novelty seeking and the polymorphism and found no effect. Results are consistent with novelty-seeking behavior being a complex trait associated with many genes, and the variance attributable to DRD4 by itself being very small. The meta-analysis of 11 studies did find that another polymorphism in the gene, the -521C/T, showed an association with novelty seeking. While human results are not strong, research in animals has suggested stronger associations and new evidence suggests that human encroachment may exert selection pressure in favor of DRD4 variants associated with novelty seeking.

=== Cognitive development ===
Several studies have suggested that parenting may affect the cognitive development of children with the 7-repeat allele of DRD4. Parenting that has maternal sensitivity, mindfulness, and autonomy–support at 15 months was found to alter children's executive functions at 18 to 20 months. Children with poorer quality parenting were more impulsive and sensation seeking than those with higher quality parenting. Higher quality parenting was associated with better executive control in 4-year-olds.

== Clinical significance ==
The D_{4} receptor has been linked to many neurological and psychiatric conditions, including schizophrenia and bipolar disorder, addictive behaviors, Parkinson's disease, and eating disorders such as anorexia nervosa.

Variants of DRD4 have also been associated with attention deficit hyperactivity disorder (ADHD). Several meta-analyses have linked the 7-repeat (7R) variant to susceptibility to ADHD.

Variants of DRD4 have been associated with autonomic nervous system dysfunction. A weak association has also been drawn between DRD4 and borderline personality disorder.

The D_{4} receptor is also a target for drugs that treat schizophrenia and Parkinson's disease.

== In popular culture ==
Michael Connelly's 2020 crime novel Fair Warning (ISBN 978-0-316-53942-5) revolves around a serial killer who uses DNA profiles obtained on the Dark Web to target female victims, specifically those whose DRD4 profiles allegedly make them more susceptible to risk taking and sexual promiscuity.

== See also ==
- Dopamine hypothesis of psychosis
