= F-15063 =

Clinical data
- Other names: F15063; F-15,063; DDEC-benzylamine
- Drug class: Dopamine D_{2} receptor antagonist; Dopamine D_{3} receptor antagonist; Dopamine D_{4} receptor partial agonist; Serotonin 5-HT_{1A} receptor partial agonist; Antipsychotic
- ATC code: None

Identifiers
- IUPAC name: N-[[3-(cyclopenten-1-yl)phenyl]methyl]-2-[(2,2-dimethyl-3H-1-benzofuran-7-yl)oxy]ethanamine
- CAS Number: 680203-70-7 936029-03-7 (deprecated)
- PubChem CID: 10248159
- ChemSpider: 8423646
- UNII: 115OSL8W3F
- ChEMBL: ChEMBL218261
- CompTox Dashboard (EPA): DTXSID001336131

Chemical and physical data
- Formula: C_{24}H_{29}NO_{2}
- Molar mass: 363.501 g·mol^{−1}
- 3D model (JSmol): Interactive image
- SMILES: CC1(CC2=C(O1)C(=CC=C2)OCCNCC3=CC(=CC=C3)C4=CCCC4)C
- InChI: InChI=1S/C24H29NO2/c1-24(2)16-21-11-6-12-22(23(21)27-24)26-14-13-25-17-18-7-5-10-20(15-18)19-8-3-4-9-19/h5-8,10-12,15,25H,3-4,9,13-14,16-17H2,1-2H3; Key:RAIDOKRWKAIHOH-UHFFFAOYSA-N

F-15063 is an orally active potential antipsychotic, and an antagonist at the dopamine D_{2} and D_{3} receptors, partial agonist at the D_{4} receptor, and agonist at the serotonin 5-HT_{1A} receptors.

== Pharmacology ==
=== Pharmacodynamics ===
It has greater efficacy at the 5-HT_{1A} receptors than other antipsychotics, such as clozapine, aripiprazole, and ziprasidone. This greater efficacy may lead to enhanced antipsychotic properties, as antipsychotics that lack 5-HT_{1A} affinity are associated with increased risk of extrapyramidal symptoms, and lack of activity against the negative symptoms of schizophrenia.

As expression of immediate-early gene (IEG) in certain brain regions may represent markers of anti-psychotic activity, expression of immediate-early gene mRNA in the prefrontal cortex and striatum was measured. Treatment with F-15,063 resulted in induction of c-fos and fosB mRNA expression in the prefrontal cortex. In the striatum, F-15,063 treatment resulted in induction of all IEGs studied (c-fos, fosB, zif268, c-jun, junB, nor1, nur77, arc).

=== Pharmacokinetics ===
Plasma levels of F-15,063 decreased seven-fold 4 hours after oral administration, and 25-fold after 8 hours. Despite this, there was still a high (65%) level of central D2 occupancy at 4 hours, and it retained its full antipsychotic potential at this time point. Even after 8 hours, F-15,063 still demonstrated some central D2 occupancy, and retained some antipsychotic activity.

== Animal studies ==
F-15,063 was tested in several animal models that predict antipsychotic activity to help determine the behavioral profile. Administration of F-15,063 blocked amphetamine and ketamine induced hyperlocomotion, but did not affect baseline, spontaneous locomotor activity. In addition, F-15,063 did not produce catalepsy, a side effect of other antipsychotics, such as haloperidol. This inhibition of catalepsy is 5-HT_{1A} receptor mediated, as pretreatment with the 5-HT_{1A} antagonist WAY-100635 reinstated catalepsy. The level of catalepsy did not increase with chronic dosing, and there was no evidence for serotonin syndrome at clinically relevant doses.

== See also ==
- List of investigational antipsychotics
