= PNU-142633 =

Names
- Preferred IUPAC name (1S)-1-{2-[4-(4-Carbamoylphenyl)piperazin-1-yl]ethyl}-N-methyl-3,4-dihydro-1H-2-benzopyran-6-carboxamide
- Other names PNU-142633F

Identifiers
CAS Number	187665-65-2; 249765-69-3 (maleate)
3D model (JSmol)	Interactive image
ChemSpider	8020862
PubChem CID	9845148
UNII	B54P1BQ73L; VF98F3655P (maleate)
CompTox Dashboard (EPA)	DTXSID00431734
- InChI: InChI=1S/C24H30N4O3/c1-26-24(30)19-4-7-21-18(16-19)9-15-31-22(21)8-10-27-11-13-28(14-12-27)20-5-2-17(3-6-20)23(25)29/h2-7,16,22H,8-15H2,1H3,(H2,25,29)(H,26,30)/t22-/m0/s1 Key: PNTVCCRNJOGKGA-QFIPXVFZSA-N; InChI=1/C24H30N4O3/c1-26-24(30)19-4-7-21-18(16-19)9-15-31-22(21)8-10-27-11-13-28(14-12-27)20-5-2-17(3-6-20)23(25)29/h2-7,16,22H,8-15H2,1H3,(H2,25,29)(H,26,30)/t22-/m0/s1 Key: PNTVCCRNJOGKGA-QFIPXVFZBB
- SMILES: NC(C(C=C1)=CC=C1N2CCN(CC[C@@H]3OCCC4=C3C=CC(C(NC)=O)=C4)CC2)=O

Properties
Chemical formula	C_{24}H_{30}N_{4}O_{3}
Molar mass	422.529 g·mol^{−1}
- Except where otherwise noted, data are given for materials in their standard state (at 25 °C [77 °F], 100 kPa). Infobox references

PNU-142633 is an experimental drug candidate for the treatment of migraine. It exerts its effect as a selective, high affinity 5-HT_{1D} receptor agonist. PNU-142633 is well tolerated after oral administration.

It was an interesting candidate due to its greater affinity for 5-HT_{1D} compared to 5-HT_{1B} receptors (typical migraine drugs such as triptans are agonists for both receptors), but experimental results were disappointing.

The structure can be compared favorably with Sonepiprazole.
