= ML398 =

Clinical data
- Other names: ML-398
- Drug class: Dopamine D_{4} receptor antagonist
- ATC code: None

Identifiers
- IUPAC name: (2R)-4-[(4-chlorophenyl)methyl]-2-(2-phenylethyl)morpholine
- PubChem CID: 72737723
- IUPHAR/BPS: 8440
- ChemSpider: 35033271
- ChEMBL: ChEMBL3335556

Chemical and physical data
- Formula: C_{19}H_{22}ClNO
- Molar mass: 315.84 g·mol^{−1}
- 3D model (JSmol): Interactive image
- SMILES: C1CO[C@@H](CN1CC2=CC=C(C=C2)Cl)CCC3=CC=CC=C3
- InChI: InChI=1S/C19H22ClNO/c20-18-9-6-17(7-10-18)14-21-12-13-22-19(15-21)11-8-16-4-2-1-3-5-16/h1-7,9-10,19H,8,11-15H2/t19-/m1/s1; Key:CVKXGRRJHJHUFY-LJQANCHMSA-N

ML398 is a potent and selective dopamine D_{4} receptor antagonist which has been used in scientific research. It shows high affinity for the dopamine D_{4} receptor (K_{i} = 36 nM) and negligible affinity for the other four dopamine receptors (>20,000 nM). As such, the drug shows more than 100-fold selectivity for the dopamine D_{4} receptor over the other dopamine receptors. It has been found to reverse cocaine-induced hyperlocomotion. The chemical synthesis of ML398 has been described. ML398 was first described in the scientific literature by 2014.
