= Rs1800955 =

SNP: rs1800955
- Name(s): C-521T, -521C/T
- Gene: DRD4
- Chromosome: 11
- Region: Promoter

External databases
- Ensembl: Human SNPView
- dbSNP: 1800955
- HapMap: 1800955
- SNPedia: 1800955
- ALFRED: SI000215I
- SzGene: Meta-analysis; Overview

In genetics, rs1800955 (also written as C-521T and -521C/T) is a single nucleotide polymorphism (SNP) located in the promoter region of the DRD4 gene. This gene codes for the dopamine receptor D4.

Due to the dopamine hypothesis of schizophrenia, the SNP has been investigated for its link to schizophrenia, and it may be slightly associated with this disorder.

The SNP has been investigated with respect to novelty seeking, — a personality trait that may be measured with the Temperament and Character Inventory. A 2008 meta-analysis indicates a possible association between novelty seeking and C-521T, though rather small.
