= Jack McEvoy =

- First appearance: The Poet (1996)
- Created by: Michael Connelly

In-universe information
- Full name: John McEvoy
- Gender: Male
- Occupation: Journalist
- Spouse: Keisha Russell (divorced)
- Relatives: Tom McAvoy (father); Millie McAvoy (mother); Sarah McEvoy (sister; deceased); Sean McEvoy (twin brother, deceased)
- Nationality: American

John "Jack" McEvoy is a literary character created by Michael Connelly in the 1996 novel The Poet and starring again in the sequel The Scarecrow thirteen years later. In-between, McEvoy appeared in one Harry Bosch novel – A Darkness More Than Night – and one Mickey Haller novel – The Brass Verdict. McEvoy starred again in Connelly's 2020 novel Fair Warning.

Connelly describes his time writing about McEvoy as his "least favorable writing experience" because "he is easily the most autobiographical character I have ever written about".

== Fictional biography ==
Jack was born on May 21, 1961, the son of Millie and Tom McEvoy, the twin brother of Sean McEvoy, and the younger brother of Sarah McEvoy, who died young. He grew up in Colorado before going to college at the Medill School of Journalism in Evanston, Illinois. After college, he lived and studied in Paris for some time, later returning to Colorado and taking a position covering the murder beat for the Rocky Mountain News.

In 1995, McEvoy investigated the supposed suicide of his brother Sean, a homicide detective. During this time he entered a romantic relationship with FBI agent Rachel Walling. After exposing the serial killer known as the Poet, who had murdered Sean as well as several other cops across the country, he moved to Los Angeles, while Walling was transferred due to their unprofessional relationship. McEvoy would go on to write a novel on the events and take a job offer from the LA Times, living off revenue from the book and his above-average salary from the newspaper.

While at the Times, he married and later divorced fellow journalist Keisha Russell. In 2009, the Times laid him off, offering him an additional two weeks of employment in return for training his replacement, Angela Cook.

While revisiting a seemingly standalone murder case, McEvoy discovered the chain of killings by a serial killer later titled the Scarecrow by the media, eventually coming back into contact with Rachel Walling and reinstating their relationship. During the investigation, Cook was murdered. After McEvoy became a major part of the story he was reporting, the Times offered him a six-month contract at a steep pay cut, which he denied. Following his departure from the newspaper, he wrote another novel, this time covering the Scarecrow case. He joined The Velvet Coffin, an online investigative journalism publication.

Years later, McEvoy was involved in an investigation that cost Walling her job and their relationship. In 2020, while working for the watchdog news website FairWarning, McEvoy reconnected with Walling again They investigated a series of similar killings across the country by a serial killer under the moniker the Shrike. During the investigation, the two rekindled once again. The case drew massive media attention. McEvoy hosted and appeared as a guest on a number of podcasts. He eventually dedicates the remainder of his career to investigating cold cases with Walling.

== List of appearances ==
- The Poet (1996)
- A Darkness More Than Night (2001)
- The Brass Verdict (2008)
- The Scarecrow (2009)
- Fair Warning (2020)
- The Proving Ground (2025)
