= 13-Hydroxylergotrile =

Clinical data
- Other names: 2-Chloro-6-methyl-13-hydroxyergoline-8β-acetonitrile
- Drug class: Dopamine receptor agonist
- ATC code: None

Chemical and physical data
- Formula: C_{17}H_{17}ClN_{3}O
- Molar mass: 314.79 g·mol^{−1}
- 3D model (JSmol): Interactive image
- SMILES: ClC1=C2C3C(=CC(O[H])=CC=3[C@]([H])3C[C@@](CC#N)CN(C)[C@]3([H])C2)N1[H]
- InChI: InChI=1S/C17H17ClN3O/c1-21-8-9(2-3-19)4-11-12-5-10(22)6-14-16(12)13(7-15(11)21)17(18)20-14/h5-6,11,15,20,22H,2,4,7-8H2,1H3/t11-,15-/m1/s1; Key:KFEUDMMGAVSBGW-IAQYHMDHSA-N

13-Hydroxylergotrile, also known as 2-chloro-6-methyl-13-hydroxyergoline-8β-acetonitrile, is a dopamine receptor agonist of the ergoline family. It is an active metabolite of the never-marketed antiparkinsonian agent lergotrile (LY-79907). The drug has been found to be 100-fold more potent as a dopamine receptor agonist than lergotrile itself in vitro. 13-Hydroxylergotrile was first described in the scientific literature by 1978.

== See also ==
- Substituted ergoline
- 13-Hydroxy-LSD
