= 14-Methyl-LSD =

Clinical data
- Other names: 14-Me-LSD; N,N-Diethyl-14-methyllysergamide; 9,10-Didehydro-N,N-diethyl-6,14-dimethylergoline-8β-carboxamide
- Drug class: Serotonin 5-HT_{2A} receptor agonist; Possible psychedelic drug or hallucinogen
- ATC code: None

Identifiers
- IUPAC name: (6aR,9R)-N,N-diethyl-3,7-dimethyl-4,6,6a,7,8,9-hexahydroindolo[4,3-fg]quinoline-9-carboxamide
- CAS Number: 3069948-26-8

Chemical and physical data
- Formula: C_{21}H_{27}N_{3}O
- Molar mass: 337.467 g·mol^{−1}
- 3D model (JSmol): Interactive image
- SMILES: CCN(C([C@@H](C1)C=C2C3=C4C(C[C@@]2([H])N1C)=CNC4=C(C)C=C3)=O)CC
- InChI: InChI=1S/C21H27N3O/c1-5-24(6-2)21(25)15-9-17-16-8-7-13(3)20-19(16)14(11-22-20)10-18(17)23(4)12-15/h7-9,11,15,18,22H,5-6,10,12H2,1-4H3/t15-,18-/m1/s1; Key:PQZLFPIADBNNMA-CRAIPNDOSA-N

14-Methyl-LSD, or 14-Me-LSD, is a serotonin 5-HT_{2A} receptor agonist and possible psychedelic drug of the lysergamide family related to lysergic acid diethylamide (LSD). It is the derivative of LSD with a methyl group at the 14 position.

The drug is a highly potent full agonist of the serotonin 5-HT_{2A} receptor, with an EC_{50} of 0.5432 nM and an E_{max} of 100.5% in an IP-1 assay. Conversely, it is a very weak partial agonist or antagonist of the serotonin 5-HT_{2B} receptor, with an EC_{50} of 2.319 nM and an E_{max} of 9.838% in an IP-1 assay.

The chemical synthesis of 14-methyl-LSD has been described. The drug's 2-bromo derivative, 2-Br-14-Me-LSD, has also been described. It is a potent serotonin 5-HT_{2A} receptor agonist similarly to 14-methyl-LSD, but with reduced potency and efficacy in comparison. According to the compounds' developers, 14-methyl-LSD may produce the head-twitch response, a behavioral proxy of psychedelic effects, in rodents, whereas 2-Br-14-Me-LSD may not produce the head-twitch response.

14-Methyl-LSD was described by David E. Nichols and colleagues in association with 2A Biosciences as a key compound in a patent in 2025.

== See also ==
- Substituted lysergamide
- 14-Methoxy-LSD
- 14-Hydroxy-LSD
- 7-Methylpsilocin (BMB-A39a)
- 7-Methyl-DMT
- 7-Me-5-MeO-DMT
