= CP-226,269 =

Chemical compound

Identifiers
- IUPAC name: 5-fluoro-2-[(4-pyridin-2-ylpiperazin-1-yl)methyl]-1H-indole
- CAS Number: 220941-93-5
- PubChem CID: 9796720
- IUPHAR/BPS: 973
- ChemSpider: 7972486
- UNII: WX4CVT9DYH
- ChEMBL: ChEMBL77395
- CompTox Dashboard (EPA): DTXSID70430875

Chemical and physical data
- Formula: C_{18}H_{19}FN_{4}
- Molar mass: 310.376 g·mol^{−1}
- 3D model (JSmol): Interactive image
- SMILES: n4ccccc4N3CCN(CC3)Cc2cc1cc(F)ccc1[nH]2
- InChI: InChI=1S/C18H19FN4/c19-15-4-5-17-14(11-15)12-16(21-17)13-22-7-9-23(10-8-22)18-3-1-2-6-20-18/h1-6,11-12,21H,7-10,13H2; Key:PQOIDBZLMJMYCD-UHFFFAOYSA-N

CP-226,269 is a drug which acts as a dopamine agonist selective for the D_{4} subtype, which is used for researching the role of D_{4} receptors in the brain.
