= Lergotrile =

Chemical compound

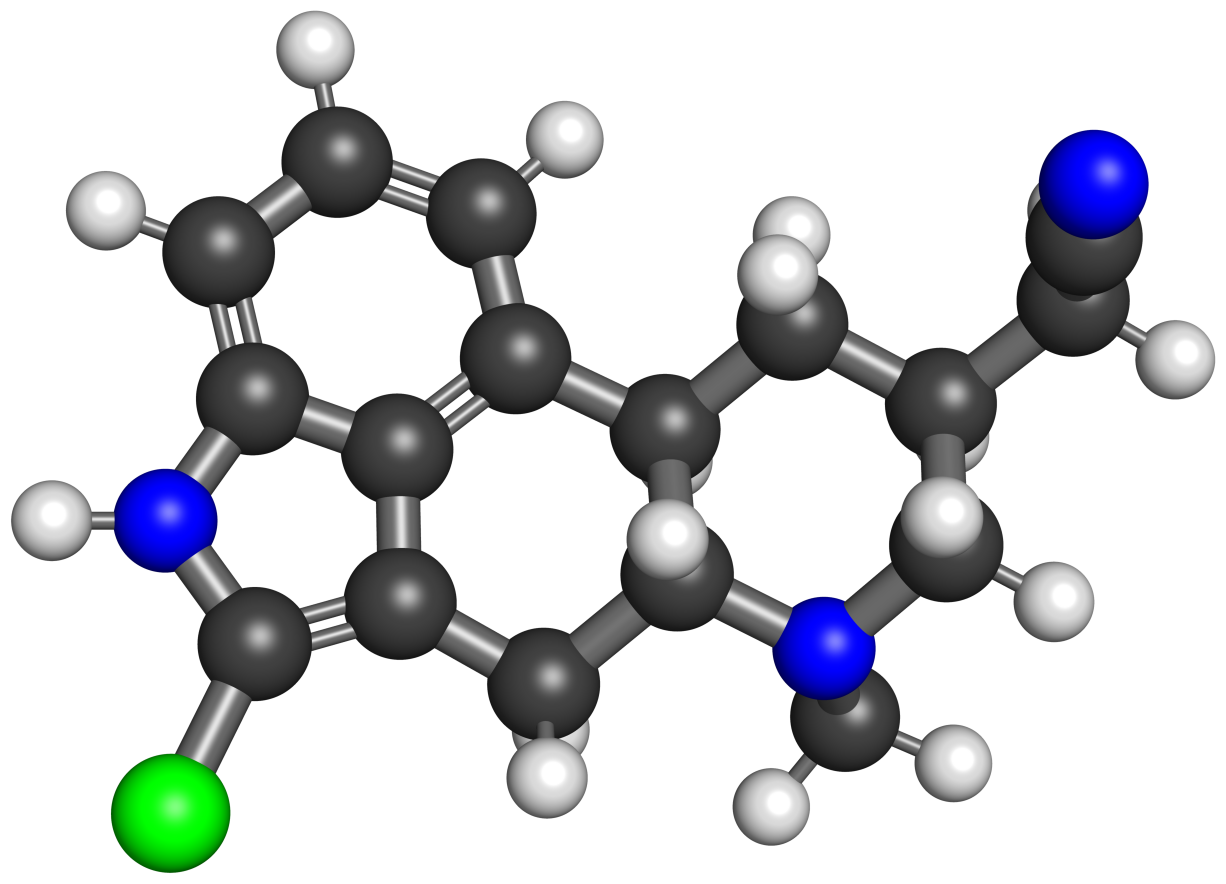

Clinical data
- Other names: LY-79907; 2-Chloro-6-methylergoline-8β-acetonitrile

Identifiers
- IUPAC name: 2-[(6aR,9S,10aR)-5-chloro-7-methyl-6,6a,8,9,10,10a-hexahydro-4H-indolo[4,3-fg]quinolin-9-yl]acetonitrile
- CAS Number: 36945-03-6
- PubChem CID: 6918447
- ChemSpider: 5293644
- UNII: O68JXU1W09
- KEGG: D04693
- ChEMBL: ChEMBL80937
- CompTox Dashboard (EPA): DTXSID701043282

Chemical and physical data
- Formula: C_{17}H_{18}ClN_{3}
- Molar mass: 299.80 g·mol^{−1}
- 3D model (JSmol): Interactive image
- SMILES: CN1C[C@@H](C[C@H]2[C@H]1CC3=C(NC4=CC=CC2=C34)Cl)CC#N
- InChI: InChI=1S/C17H18ClN3/c1-21-9-10(5-6-19)7-12-11-3-2-4-14-16(11)13(8-15(12)21)17(18)20-14/h2-4,10,12,15,20H,5,7-9H2,1H3/t10-,12-,15-/m1/s1; Key:JKAHWGPTNVUTNB-IXPVHAAZSA-N

Lergotrile (INN, USAN; developmental code name LY-79907) is an ergoline derivative which acts as a dopamine receptor agonist. It was developed for the treatment of Parkinson's disease, but failed in clinical trials due to liver toxicity.

The drug's hydroxylated metabolite 13-hydroxylergotrile is 100-fold more potent as a dopamine receptor agonist than lergotrile itself in vitro.

== See also ==
- Substituted ergoline
- Delergotrile
