= PD-168,077 =

Chemical compound

Identifiers
- IUPAC name: N-([4-(2-cyanophenyl)piperazin-1-yl]methyl)-3-methylbenzamide
- CAS Number: 190383-31-4
- PubChem CID: 3645619
- IUPHAR/BPS: 975
- ChemSpider: 2879553
- ChEMBL: ChEMBL45244
- CompTox Dashboard (EPA): DTXSID7044007

Chemical and physical data
- Formula: C_{20}H_{22}N_{4}O
- Molar mass: 334.423 g·mol^{−1}
- 3D model (JSmol): Interactive image
- SMILES: Cc2cc(ccc2)C(=O)NCN(CC3)CCN3c1ccccc1C#N
- InChI: InChI=1S/C20H22N4O/c1-16-5-4-7-17(13-16)20(25)22-15-23-9-11-24(12-10-23)19-8-3-2-6-18(19)14-21/h2-8,13H,9-12,15H2,1H3,(H,22,25); Key:DNULYRGWTFLJQL-UHFFFAOYSA-N

PD-168,077 is a drug which acts as a dopamine agonist selective for the D_{4} subtype, which is used for researching the role of D_{4} receptors in the brain, particularly relating to learning and memory. It also induces penile erections in rats.
