= Delergotrile =

Clinical data
- Other names: CM 29-712; CM-29712; CM29-712; 6-Methylergoline-8α-acetonitrile; 6-Methyl-8α-(cyanomethyl)ergoline
- Drug class: Dopamine receptor agonist; Antiparkinsonian agent
- ATC code: None

Identifiers
- IUPAC name: 2-[(6aR,9R,10aR)-7-methyl-6,6a,8,9,10,10a-hexahydro-4H-indolo[4,3-fg]quinolin-9-yl]acetonitrile
- CAS Number: 59091-65-5
- PubChem CID: 10264850
- ChemSpider: 8440329
- UNII: 3U2FEE7NXX
- ChEMBL: ChEMBL174095
- CompTox Dashboard (EPA): DTXSID101024216

Chemical and physical data
- Formula: C_{17}H_{19}N_{3}
- Molar mass: 265.360 g·mol^{−1}
- 3D model (JSmol): Interactive image
- SMILES: CN1C[C@H](C[C@H]2[C@H]1CC3=CNC4=CC=CC2=C34)CC#N
- InChI: InChI=1S/C17H19N3/c1-20-10-11(5-6-18)7-14-13-3-2-4-15-17(13)12(9-19-15)8-16(14)20/h2-4,9,11,14,16,19H,5,7-8,10H2,1H3/t11-,14+,16+/m0/s1; Key:LBMFWYCMCHRLBU-SGIREYDYSA-N

Delergotrile (INN; developmental code name CM 29-712), also known as 6-methylergoline-8α-acetonitrile, is a dopamine receptor agonist of the ergoline family described as an antiparkinsonian agent which was never marketed. It is an analogue of lergotrile (LY-79907).

The drug shows high affinity for the dopamine D_{2} receptor (K_{i} = 34 nM). In addition to dopamine receptors, delergotrile shows affinity for the serotonin 5-HT_{1} receptor (K_{0.5} = 2.0 nM) and for the serotonin 5-HT_{2} receptor (K_{i} = 57 nM), as well as for the α_{1}- and α_{2}-adrenergic receptors. The drug appears to be an agonist of both dopamine D_{1} and to a lesser extent D_{2} receptors. Due to its dopamine receptor agonism, delergotrile produces antiparkinsonian-like effects, induces changes in locomotor activity and stereotypy, and reverses reserpine-induced akinesia in rodents. It also produces effects consistent with weak blockade of α-adrenergic receptors in rodents.

Delergotrile was first described in the literature by 1976. It was developed by Sandoz.

== See also ==
- Substituted ergoline
