= Sonepiprazole =

Chemical compound

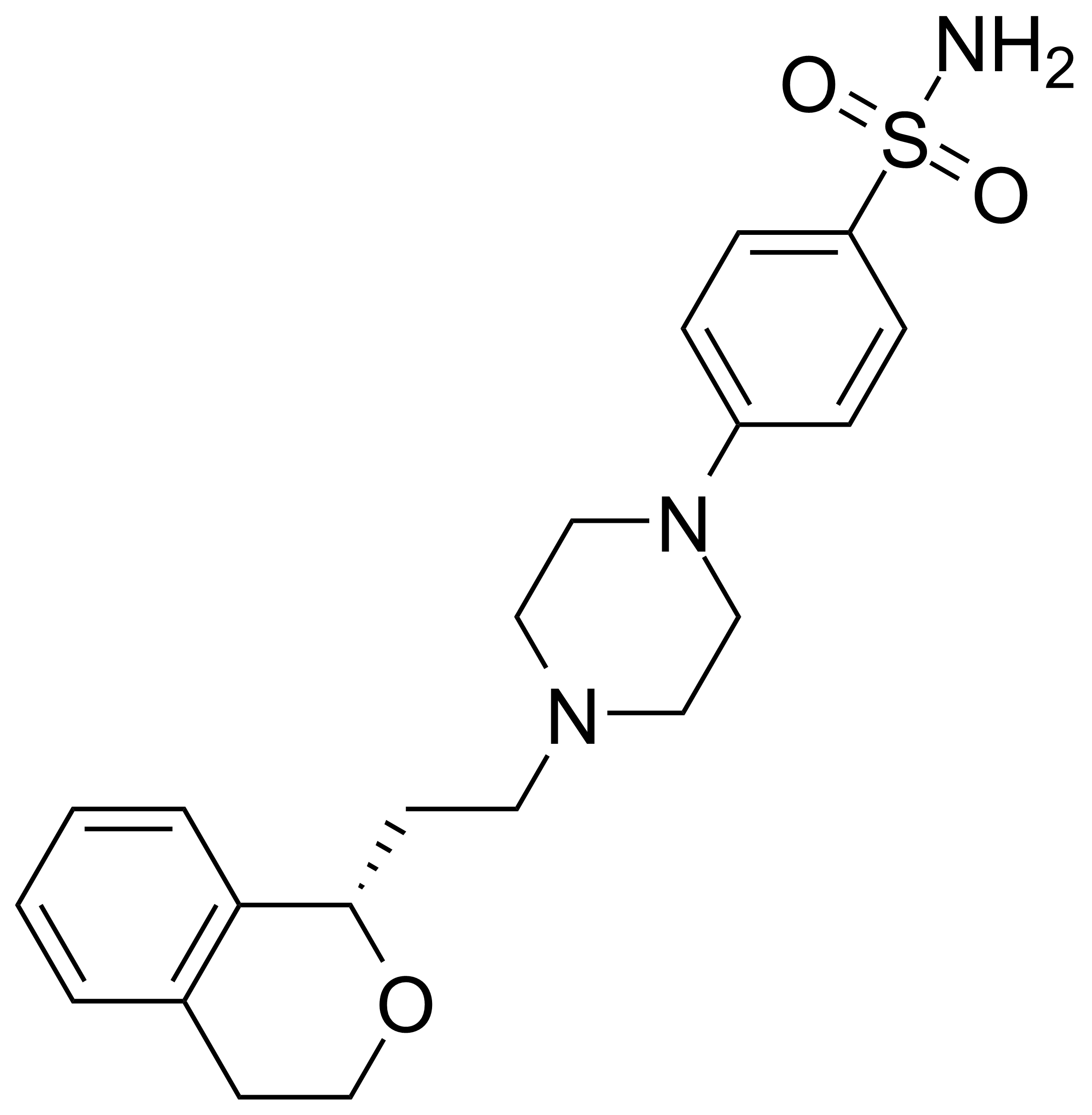

Clinical data
- Other names: U-101387; U-101,387; U-101387G; U101387G; U-101,387G; PNU-101387; PNU101387; PNU-101,387
- Routes of administration: Oral
- Drug class: Dopamine D_{4} receptor antagonist
- ATC code: None

Legal status
- Legal status: In general: uncontrolled

Identifiers
- IUPAC name: 4-(4-{2-[(1S)-3,4-dihydro-1H-isochromen-1-yl]ethyl}piperazin-1-yl)benzenesulfonamide
- CAS Number: 170858-33-0; as salt: 170858-34-1
- PubChem CID: 133079
- IUPHAR/BPS: 980
- DrugBank: DB21014
- ChemSpider: 117441
- UNII: O609V24217; as salt: 980MD32QLW
- CompTox Dashboard (EPA): DTXSID801317650

Chemical and physical data
- Formula: C_{21}H_{27}N_{3}O_{3}S
- Molar mass: 401.53 g·mol^{−1}
- 3D model (JSmol): Interactive image
- SMILES: C1CO[C@H](C2=CC=CC=C21)CCN3CCN(CC3)C4=CC=C(C=C4)S(=O)(=O)N
- InChI: InChI=InChI=1S/C21H27N3O3S/c22-28(25,26)19-7-5-18(6-8-19)24-14-12-23(13-15-24)11-9-21-20-4-2-1-3-17(20)10-16-27-21/h1-8,21H,9-16H2,(H2,22,25,26)/t21-/m0/s1; Key:WNUQCGWXPNGORO-NRFANRHFSA-N

Sonepiprazole (INN; developmental code names U-101387 and PNU-101387) is a highly selective dopamine D_{4} receptor antagonist of the phenylpiperazine family.

The drug showed high affinity for the dopamine D_{4.2} receptor (K_{i} = 24 nM) and negligible affinity for other dopamine receptors (K_{i} = >1,000 nM). In animals, unlike D_{2} receptor antagonists like haloperidol, sonepiprazole does not block the behavioral effects of amphetamine or apomorphine, does not alter spontaneous locomotor activity on its own, and lacks extrapyramidal and neuroendocrine effects. However, it does reverse the prepulse inhibition deficits induced by apomorphine, and has also been shown to enhance cortical activity and inhibit stress-induced cognitive impairment.

Sonepiprazole was investigated as an antipsychotic for the treatment of schizophrenia in a placebo-controlled clinical trial, but in contrast to olanzapine, no benefits were found, and it was not researched further for this use. It was under development by Pharmacia Corporation for the treatment of schizophrenia, and reached phase 2 clinical trials for this indication, but development was discontinued in March 2001.

== See also ==
- List of investigational antipsychotics
- Substituted phenylpiperazine
- Lu 35-138
- PNU-142633
- Terikalant
