= The Poet (novel) =

1996 novel by Michael Connelly

- First edition (US)
- Author: Michael Connelly
- Language: English
- Series: Jack McEvoy
- Release number: 1
- Genre: Crime, mystery, thriller
- Publisher: Little, Brown and Company
- Publication date: January 28, 1996
- Publication place: United States
- Media type: Print (paperback), audiobook, e-book
- Pages: 434
- ISBN: 0316153982
- Followed by: The Scarecrow

The Poet is a crime thriller novel, and the fifth novel by American author Michael Connelly. Published in January 28, 1996 by Little, Brown and Company, it is the first of Connelly's novels not to feature Detective Harry Bosch and the first to feature Crime Reporter Jack McEvoy. A sequel, The Scarecrow, was published in 2009. The Poet won the 1997 Dilys Award.

The story is told in first-person narrative from the perspective of reporter Jack McEvoy. At times, a first-person narrative is also used for a mysterious character named "Eidolon". While telling the story from the viewpoint of pedophile William Gladden, Connelly uses third-person narrative. The book also features the first appearance of FBI agent Rachel Walling, a recurring character in Connelly's novels.

In April 2004, The Poet was reissued in paperback with an introduction by Stephen King.

== Plot ==
Jack McEvoy, a crime reporter for the Rocky Mountain News, is informed that his identical twin brother Sean, a Denver homicide detective, has died in an apparent suicide. Despite the apparent implausibility that foul play was involved, Jack is reluctant to accept that his brother had succumbed to depression. He re-examines Sean's investigation into the gruesome death of a college student, Theresa Lofton, and concludes that his brother's death was staged.

Jack links Sean's death to three other detectives who apparently killed themselves under similar circumstances and who, like Sean, were found with one-sentence suicide notes quoting Edgar Allan Poe. When the FBI attempts to block the investigation, Jack is able to trade his knowledge of the other deaths for a role with their team, which includes Robert Backus, the agent-in-charge, and Rachel Walling, who is assigned to handle Jack and becomes personally involved with him. The FBI nicknames the serial killer "The Poet" because of how he features Poe in his killings.

The case soon focuses on an online pedophile network, with one particular participant, William Gladden, getting the most attention. Jack is taken along on the operation to arrest Gladden, who kills one of the FBI agents, Rachel's ex-husband Gordon Thorson. Jack ends up killing Gladden himself while being held hostage. However, comments made by Gladden lead Jack to believe that he was not the killer, even though the case has been officially closed.

Jack finds evidence suggesting that the killer has a connection to the FBI, tracing a "boasting" fax back to Thorson. Since Jack knew that she had sent Thorson on a fake errand to buy condoms at the time the fax was sent, he suspects Walling of being The Poet and of posting to the pedophile network under the name "Eidolon", another Poe reference. He then learns that her father, a cop, had been suspected of molesting her and committed suicide when she was a teenager.

Jack informs Backus of his suspicions, only for Backus to lure him to a remote location where he is drugged. Backus admits that he himself is both Eidolon and The Poet, admitting to all of the killings and to his setup of Gladden as the "fall guy" for the murders. As Backus prepares to sodomize and then kill Jack, Walling appears and knocks Backus out the window and down a long hill. The police later find a body in a culvert; however, it is left ambiguous as to whether this is Backus.

Meanwhile, as the facts of the case become known, Walling's judgment is called into question owing to her personal relationship with Jack and her professional relationship with Backus. However, because Jack suspected her, Walling ends their relationship and takes a trip to Italy. Jack then takes leave from his newspaper to write a book about the events, although Walling explains to him that the book will forever taint the FBI because of Backus.

== Awards and nominations ==
The Poet won the 1997 Anthony Award, presented by the Mystery Writers of America and the Dilys Award, presented by the Independent Mystery Booksellers Association.
