= L-745,870 =

Chemical compound

Identifiers
- IUPAC name: 3-([4-(4-chlorophenyl)piperazin-1-yl]methyl)-1H-pyrrolo[2,3-b]pyridine
- CAS Number: 158985-00-3
- PubChem CID: 5311200
- IUPHAR/BPS: 3303
- ChemSpider: 4470720
- UNII: J3OLN3XSX7
- ChEMBL: ChEMBL267014
- CompTox Dashboard (EPA): DTXSID40415513

Chemical and physical data
- Formula: C_{18}H_{19}ClN_{4}
- Molar mass: 326.83 g·mol^{−1}
- 3D model (JSmol): Interactive image
- SMILES: c1cc2c(c[nH]c2nc1)CN3CCN(CC3)c4ccc(cc4)Cl
- InChI: InChI=1S/C18H19ClN4/c19-15-3-5-16(6-4-15)23-10-8-22(9-11-23)13-14-12-21-18-17(14)2-1-7-20-18/h1-7,12H,8-11,13H2,(H,20,21); Key:OGJGQVFWEPNYSB-UHFFFAOYSA-N

L-745,870 is a drug which acts as a dopamine receptor antagonist selective for the D_{4} subtype, and has antipsychotic effects in animal models, though it was not effective in human trials.
