= Lysergic acid ethyl-2-hydroxyethylamide =

LEO

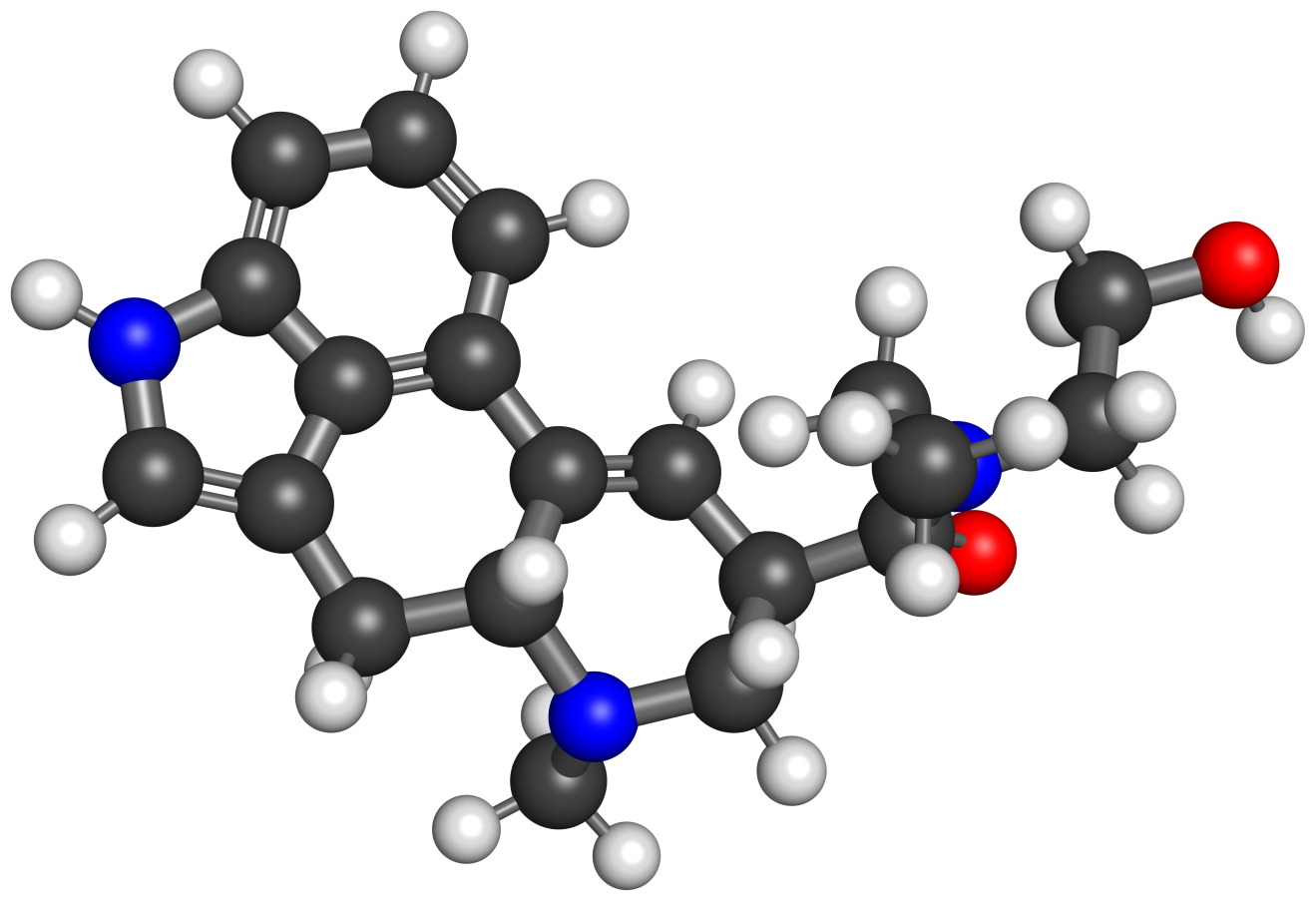

Clinical data
- Other names: LEO; N-Ethyl-N-(2-hydroxyethyl)-6-methyl-9,10-didehydroergoline-8β-carboxamide
- Drug class: Serotonin receptor modulator
- ATC code: None

Identifiers
- IUPAC name: (6aR,9R)-N-ethyl-N-(2-hydroxyethyl)-7-methyl-6,6a,8,9-tetrahydro-4H-indolo[4,3-fg]quinoline-9-carboxamide
- CAS Number: 65527-58-4
- PubChem CID: 53938953
- ChemSpider: 128919021

Chemical and physical data
- Formula: C_{20}H_{25}N_{3}O_{2}
- Molar mass: 339.439 g·mol^{−1}
- 3D model (JSmol): Interactive image
- SMILES: CCN(CCO)C(=O)[C@H]1CN([C@@H]2CC3=CNC4=CC=CC(=C34)C2=C1)C
- InChI: InChI=1S/C20H25N3O2/c1-3-23(7-8-24)20(25)14-9-16-15-5-4-6-17-19(15)13(11-21-17)10-18(16)22(2)12-14/h4-6,9,11,14,18,21,24H,3,7-8,10,12H2,1-2H3/t14-,18-/m1/s1; Key:IWLBOZQDDPXOIT-RDTXWAMCSA-N

Lysergic acid ethyl-2-hydroxyethylamide (LEO) is a serotonin receptor modulator of the lysergamide family related to lysergic acid diethylamide (LSD). It is the derivative of LSD in which one of its N-ethyl groups of LSD has been hydroxylated at the end or 2 position. It is also an active metabolite of LSD including in humans. LEO shows potent antiserotonergic activity and oxytocic activity in the isolated rat uterus in vitro similarly to LSD. In addition, it produced hyperthermia in rabbits in vivo similarly to LSD. LEO was first described in the scientific literature by 1974.

== See also ==
- Substituted lysergamide
- LA-MeO
- Lysergic acid hydroxyethylamide (LSH)
- Ergometrine
- 13-Hydroxy-LSD
