= 12-Methoxy-LSD =

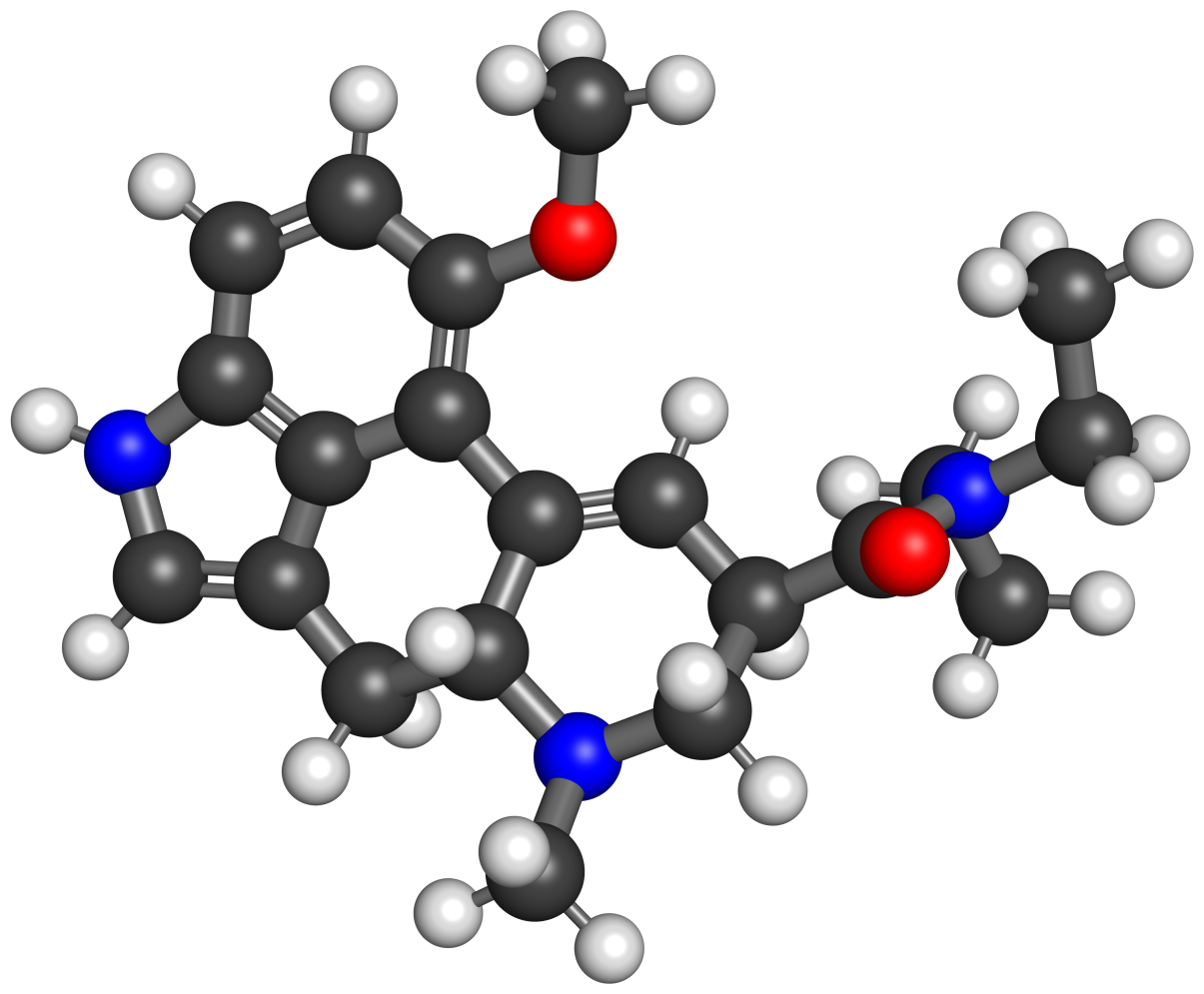

Clinical data
- Other names: 12-MeO-LSD; "5-MeO-LSD"; "5-Methoxy-LSD"; 9,10-Didehydro-N,N-diethyl-6-methyl-12-methoxyergoline-8β-carboxamide
- Drug class: Serotonin receptor modulator

Identifiers
- IUPAC name: (6aR,9R)-N,N-diethyl-1-methoxy-7-methyl-6,6a,8,9-tetrahydro-4H-indolo[4,3-fg]quinoline-9-carboxamide
- CAS Number: 50484-99-6
- PubChem CID: 3039341
- ChemSpider: 2302827
- CompTox Dashboard (EPA): DTXSID30198505

Chemical and physical data
- Formula: C_{21}H_{27}N_{3}O_{2}
- Molar mass: 353.466 g·mol^{−1}
- 3D model (JSmol): Interactive image
- SMILES: CCN(CC)C(=O)[C@H]1CN([C@@H]2CC3=CNC4=C3C(=C(C=C4)OC)C2=C1)C
- InChI: InChI=1S/C21H27N3O2/c1-5-24(6-2)21(25)14-9-15-17(23(3)12-14)10-13-11-22-16-7-8-18(26-4)20(15)19(13)16/h7-9,11,14,17,22H,5-6,10,12H2,1-4H3/t14-,17-/m1/s1; Key:AYFDTTGGASATFS-RHSMWYFYSA-N

12-Methoxy-LSD, also known as 12-methoxylysergic acid diethylamide, is a drug of the ergoline and lysergamide families and a derivative of lysergic acid diethylamide (LSD). In terms of chemical structure, 12-methoxy-LSD is to LSD as 5-MeO-DMT is to dimethyltryptamine (DMT), with 12-methoxy-LSD notably containing 5-MeO-DMT within its conformationally constrained structure. Both 12-methoxy-LSD and its analogue 12-hydroxy-LSD have been described as non-hallucinogenic in humans. However, in other more recent reports, 12-hydroxy-LSD produced psychedelic-like effects in rodents and was said to have similar activity as LSD in humans.

== Pharmacology ==
It has been reported that 12-methoxy-LSD does not produce hallucinogenic effects in humans. However, it is nonetheless pharmacologically active in animal studies. The drug's effects in rabbits include antiserotonergic activity (20% of that of LSD) and hyperthermia (dose ratio relative to LD_{50} of 1:17 for 12-methoxy-LSD and 1:725 for LSD). In addition, like LSD, it is highly potent in terms of lethality, with a median lethal dose (LD_{50}) of 0.1 mg/kg i.v. in rabbits (relative to 0.1 mg/kg for LSD). 12-Methoxy-LSD also produces LSD-like electroencephalogram (EEG) changes in rabbits.

Presumably 12-methoxy-LSD acts as an agonist of serotonin and dopamine receptors, as with LSD and other related lysergamides, but its pharmacology has not been studied with modern techniques.

== Chemistry ==
=== Synthesis ===
The chemical synthesis of 12-substituted lysergamides is described as being very difficult.

=== Analogues ===
An analogue of 12-methoxy-LSD is 12-hydroxy-LSD, which would be structurally akin to bufotenin (5-HO-DMT). As with 12-methoxy-LSD, it has been reported that 12-hydroxy-LSD is inactive as a psychedelic in humans. Contrary to this report however, Michael Valentine Smith claimed in his 1981 book Psychedelic Chemistry that 12-hydroxy-LSD has "about the same activity as LSD". In addition, 12-hydroxy-LSD has been found to substitute for LSD in rodent drug discrimination tests with about 20% of its potency.

== History ==
12-Methoxy-LSD was first described in the scientific literature by 1967. Subsequently, it was further described in the 1970s and 1980s.

== See also ==
- Substituted lysergamide
- 12-Hydroxy-LSD
- 13-Methoxy-LSD
- 14-Methoxy-LSD
- LA-MeO
- 5-MeO-DMT
