= 14-Hydroxy-LSD =

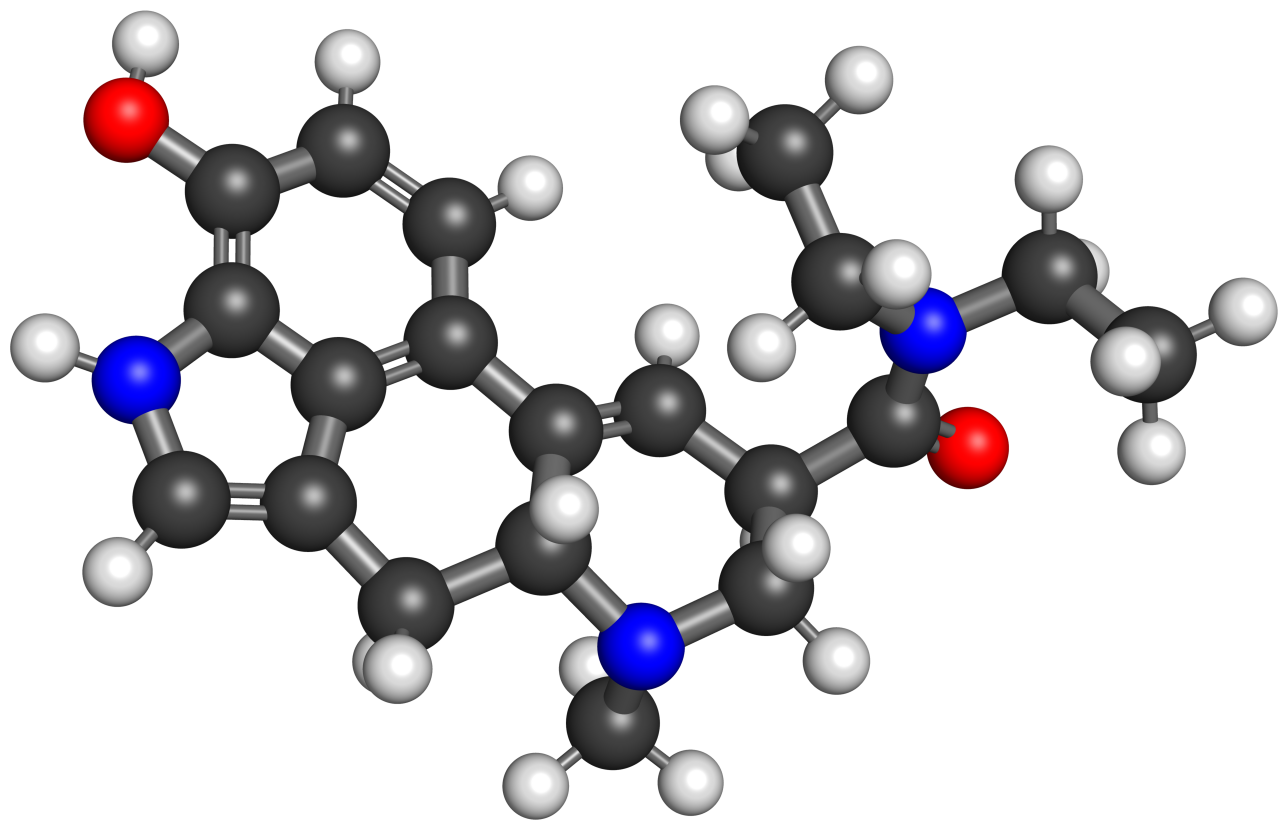

Clinical data
- Other names: 14-Hydroxylysergic acid diethylamide; 14-OH-LSD; 14-HO-LSD; N,N-Diethyl-14-hydroxy-6-methyl-9,10-didehydroergoline-8β-carboxamide
- Drug class: Dopamine D_{2} and D_{4} receptor agonist
- ATC code: None

Identifiers
- IUPAC name: (6aR,9R)-N,N-diethyl-3-hydroxy-7-methyl-6,6a,8,9-tetrahydro-4H-indolo[4,3-fg]quinoline-9-carboxamide
- PubChem CID: 155804051

Chemical and physical data
- Formula: C_{20}H_{25}N_{3}O_{2}
- Molar mass: 339.439 g·mol^{−1}
- 3D model (JSmol): Interactive image
- SMILES: CCN(CC)C(=O)[C@H]1CN([C@@H]2CC3=CNC4=C(C=CC(=C34)C2=C1)O)C
- InChI: InChI=1S/C20H25N3O2/c1-4-23(5-2)20(25)13-8-15-14-6-7-17(24)19-18(14)12(10-21-19)9-16(15)22(3)11-13/h6-8,10,13,16,21,24H,4-5,9,11H2,1-3H3/t13-,16-/m1/s1; Key:LAJBWPLMZBFOHF-CZUORRHYSA-N

14-Hydroxy-LSD is a lysergamide and a metabolite of the psychedelic drug lysergic acid diethylamide (LSD). It is formed via aromatic hydroxylation at position 14 of the lysergic acid moiety and is subsequently excreted as a glucuronide conjugate. The drug has been found to act as a highly potent dopamine D_{2} and D_{4} receptor agonist, with much greater potency than LSD itself.

== Pharmacology ==
=== Pharmacodynamics ===
David E. Nichols noted in 2016 that the pharmacology of hydroxylated LSD metabolites, including 14-hydroxy-LSD, had not been studied. Notably, 14-hydroxy-LSD does not induce LSD-like changes in the electroencephalogram (EEG) of rabbits, in contrast to LSD and 13-hydroxy-LSD. Subsequently, Nichols and colleagues studied 14-hydroxy-LSD in 2026 and found that it acts as a highly potent dopamine D_{2} and D_{4} receptor full agonist, with EC_{50} (E_{max}) values of 1.2 nM (97%) and 1.6 nM (97%), respectively. It was about 16- and 9-fold more potent than LSD in terms of these actions, respectively.

=== Pharmacokinetics ===
14-Hydroxy-LSD is a major metabolite of LSD in rats and guinea pigs, where it is excreted predominantly as a glucuronide in bile and urine. In contrast, it appears only as a minor metabolite in rhesus monkeys and humans. Studies using human liver microsomes and urine samples have confirmed its presence in humans, but in low concentrations that are often below quantification limits. The specific enzymes involved in the formation of hydroxylated LSD metabolites like 14-hydroxy-LSD remain unidentified.

== History ==
14-Hydroxy-LSD was first reported in the scientific literature by at least 1975.

== See also ==
- Substituted lysergamide
- 14-Methoxy-LSD
- 14-Methyl-LSD
- 12-Hydroxy-LSD
- 13-Hydroxy-LSD
- 2-Oxo-LSD
- 2-Oxo-3-hydroxy-LSD
