= 13-Hydroxy-LSD =

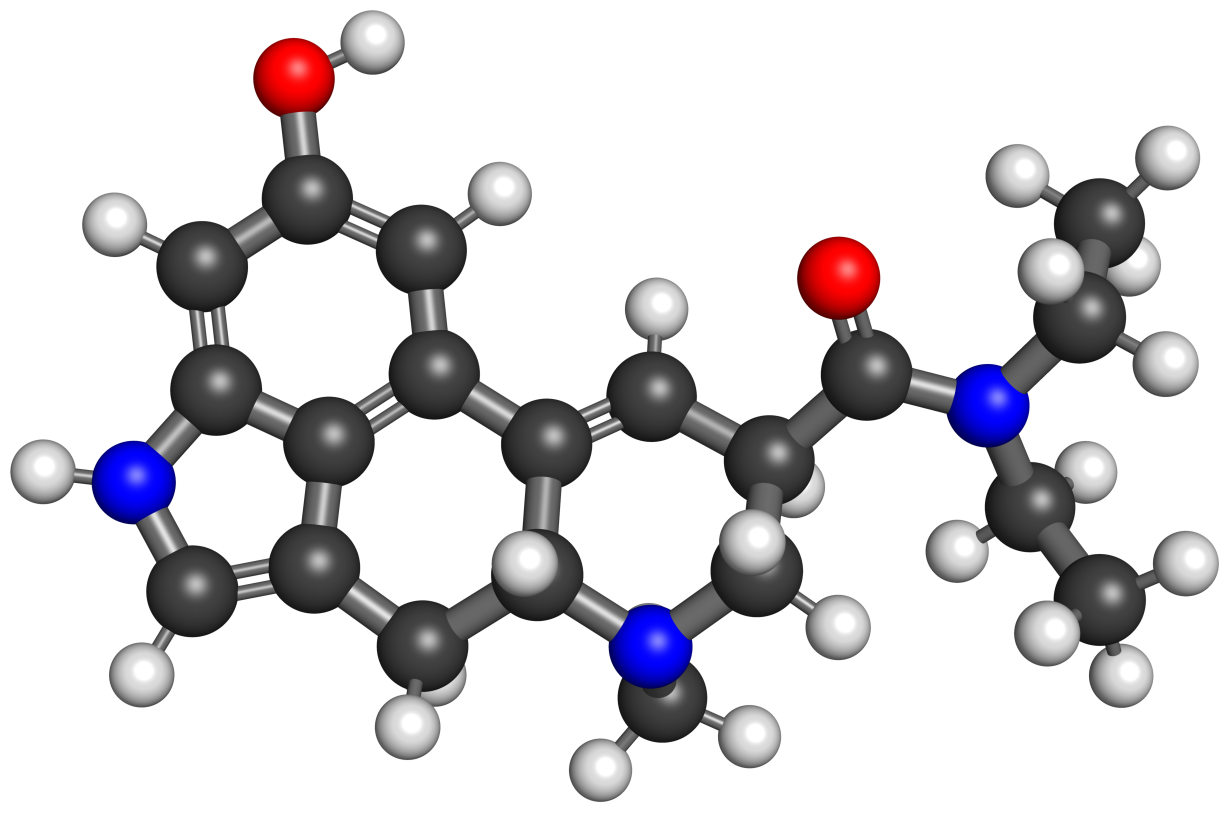

Clinical data
- Other names: 13-Hydroxylysergic acid diethylamide; 13-OH-LSD; N,N-Diethyl-13-hydroxy-6-methyl-9,10-didehydroergoline-8β-carboxamide
- Drug class: Dopamine D_{4} receptor agonist; Dopamine D_{2} receptor agonist
- ATC code: None

Pharmacokinetic data
- Metabolism: Glucuronidation

Identifiers
- IUPAC name: (6aR,9R)-N,N-diethyl-2-hydroxy-7-methyl-6,6a,8,9-tetrahydro-4H-indolo[4,3-fg]quinoline-9-carboxamide
- PubChem CID: 56634866

Chemical and physical data
- Formula: C_{20}H_{25}N_{3}O_{2}
- Molar mass: 339.439 g·mol^{−1}
- 3D model (JSmol): Interactive image
- SMILES: CCN(CC)C(=O)[C@H]1CN([C@@H]2CC3=CNC4=CC(=CC(=C34)C2=C1)O)C
- InChI: InChI=1S/C20H25N3O2/c1-4-23(5-2)20(25)13-6-15-16-8-14(24)9-17-19(16)12(10-21-17)7-18(15)22(3)11-13/h6,8-10,13,18,21,24H,4-5,7,11H2,1-3H3/t13-,18-/m1/s1; Key:DZJOIBRTROBFRQ-FZKQIMNGSA-N

13-Hydroxy-LSD is a lysergamide and a metabolite of the psychedelic drug lysergic acid diethylamide (LSD). It is a major metabolite of LSD in rats and guinea pigs but a minor metabolite of LSD in monkeys and humans. The drug acts as an extremely potent dopamine D_{4} receptor agonist and may contribute to LSD's psychoactive effects, though more research is needed in this area.

== Pharmacology ==
=== Pharmacokinetics ===
According to David E. Nichols in 2016, the pharmacology of hydroxylated metabolites of LSD like 13-hydroxy-LSD has not been studied. Nichols has posited that metabolism of LSD into active metabolites with potent dopamine receptor activity may be responsible for the delayed-onset dopaminergic stimulus effects of LSD in rodent drug discrimination tests. Relatedly, lergotrile's corresponding metabolite 13-hydroxylergotrile is 100-fold more potent as a dopamine receptor agonist than lergotrile itself in vitro. 13-Hydroxy-LSD has been reported to produce LSD-like electroencephalogram (EEG) changes in rabbits.

Subsequently, 13-hydroxy-LSD was shown by Nichols and colleagues in 2026 to be an extremely potent dopamine D_{4} receptor agonist, with an EC_{50} of 36 pM and E_{max} of 85% and with 380 times greater potency than LSD itself (which had an EC_{50} of 14 nM). Moreover, 13-hydroxy-LSD is among the most potent dopamine D_{4} receptor agonists ever to have been discovered. In addition to its dopamine D_{4} receptor agonism, 13-hydroxy-LSD was also found to be a highly potent dopamine D_{2} receptor agonist with about 4-fold lower potency (EC_{50} = 137 pM; E_{max} = 88%). While 13-hydroxy-LSD is only a minor metabolite of LSD in humans, it is so potent as a dopamine D_{2}-like receptor agonist that it may contribute to LSD's effects and may be responsible for the delayed dopaminergic or "paranoid" phase of LSD's effects. However, more research is needed to further evaluate this possibility.

=== Pharmacokinetics ===
13-Hydroxy-LSD is a major metabolite of LSD in rats and guinea pigs but a minor metabolite of LSD in monkeys and humans. Following its formation, 13-hydroxy-LSD undergoes further metabolism via glucuronidation. Little is known about the specific enzymes responsible for generation of LSD metabolites such as 13-hydroxy-LSD in humans.

== Chemistry ==
The 13 position of the ergoline ring system as in LSD and 13-hydroxy-LSD corresponds to the 6 position of the indole ring as in simple tryptamines. 6-Hydroxy-DMT has been found to be active but less potent than dimethyltryptamine (DMT) in animals and to be inactive in humans at the assessed doses. Similarly, it showed very low affinity for the serotonin 5-HT_{2} receptors.

== History ==
13-Hydroxy-LSD was first described in the scientific literature by at least 1963. It was further studied and described by Nichols and colleagues in 2026. The group had tried unsuccessfully to synthesize 13-hydroxy-LSD for many years before finally developing new synthetic procedures. The new short total synthesis allowing A ring substituents was developed by Joel M. Smith and Ryan C. Harbit.

== See also ==
- Substituted lysergamide
- LSD § Psychological (two phases of effects)
- Psychedelic microdosing § Neurological toxicity
- 13-Methoxy-LSD
- 12-Hydroxy-LSD
- 14-Hydroxy-LSD
- 6-Hydroxy-DMT
- 2-Oxo-LSD
- 2-Oxo-3-hydroxy-LSD
