= LA-MeO =

Clinical data
- Other names: LSD-MeO; Lysergic acid ethyl-2-methoxyethylamide; N-Ethyl-N-(2-methoxyethyl)lysergamide; LEO O-methyl ether; N-Ethyl-N-(2-methoxyethyl)-6-methyl-9,10-didehydroergoline-8β-carboxamide
- Drug class: Serotonin receptor modulator; Serotonin 5-HT_{2A} receptor agonist
- ATC code: None

Identifiers
- IUPAC name: (6aR,9R)-N-ethyl-N-(2-methoxyethyl)-7-methyl-4,6,6a,7,8,9-hexahydroindolo[4,3-fg]quinoline-9-carboxamide

Chemical and physical data
- Formula: C_{21}H_{27}N_{3}O_{2}
- Molar mass: 353.466 g·mol^{−1}
- 3D model (JSmol): Interactive image
- SMILES: COCCN(C(=O)[C@H]1CN(C)[C@H]2C(=C1)c1cccc3c1c(C2)c[nH]3)CC
- InChI: InChI=1S/C21H27N3O2/c1-4-24(8-9-26-3)21(25)15-10-17-16-6-5-7-18-20(16)14(12-22-18)11-19(17)23(2)13-15/h5-7,10,12,15,19,22H,4,8-9,11,13H2,1-3H3/t15-,19-/m1/s1; Key:BQPPMBUEDZCBOR-DNVCBOLYSA-N

LA-MeO, also known as lysergic acid ethyl-2-methoxyethylamide or as N-ethyl-N-(2-methoxyethyl)lysergamide, is a serotonin receptor modulator of the lysergamide family related to lysergic acid diethylamide (LSD). It is the O-methyl ether derivative of the LSD metabolite lysergic acid ethyl-2-hydroxyethylamide (LEO).

The drug shows high affinity for the serotonin 5-HT_{1A}, 5-HT_{2A}, and 5-HT_{2C} receptors (K_{i} = 4.0 nM, 7.1 nM, and 7.8 nM, respectively). It acts as a potent partial agonist of the serotonin 5-HT_{2A} receptor similarly to LSD, with an EC_{50} of 30.3 nM and an E_{max} of 29.6% (relative to 8.4 nM and 22.4% in the case of LSD, respectively).

LA-MeO was first described in the scientific literature by Jason C. Parrish of the lab of David E. Nichols at Purdue University by 2007.

== See also ==
- Substituted lysergamide
- Lysergic acid ethyl-2-hydroxyethylamide (LEO)
- 12-Methoxy-LSD
