= 12-Hydroxy-LSD =

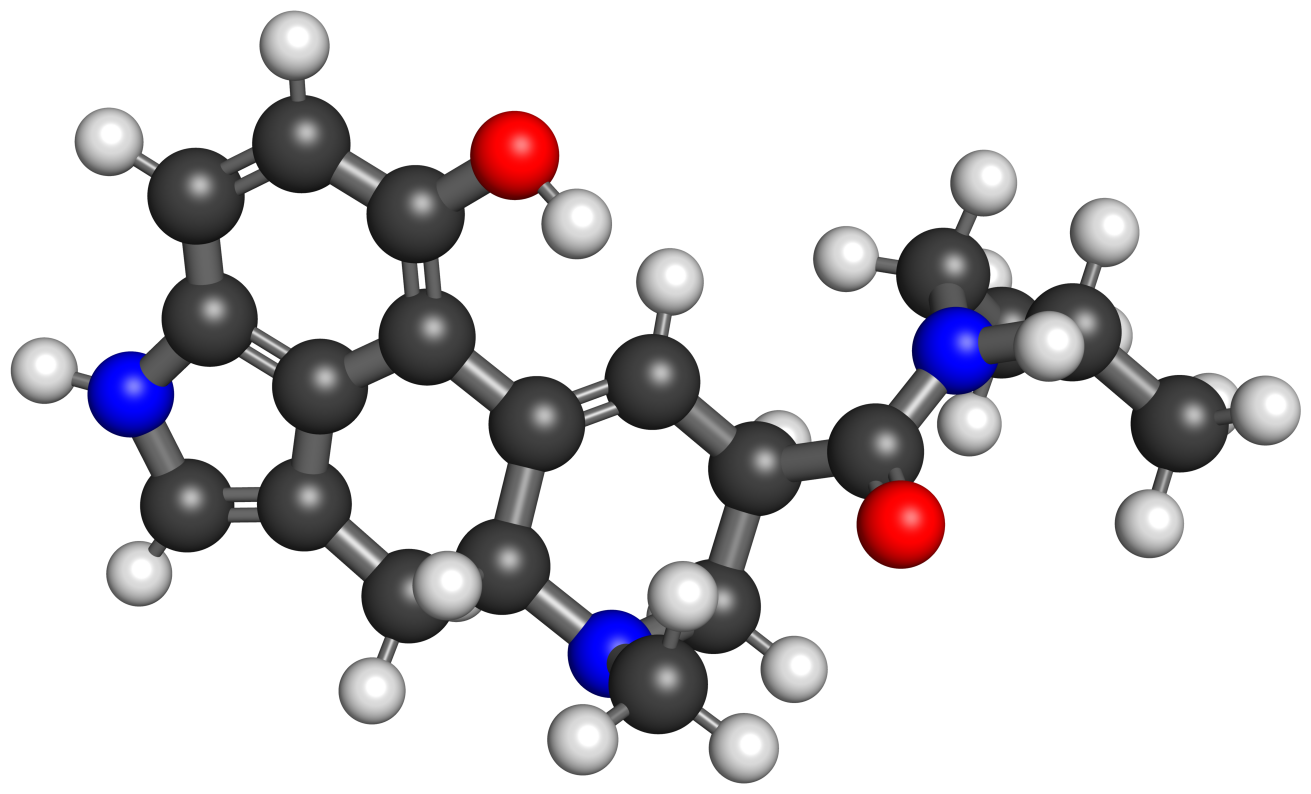

Clinical data
- Other names: 12-Hydroxylysergic acid diethylamide; 12-OH-LSD; 12-HO-LSD; "5-OH-LSD"; "5-HO-LSD"; "5-Hydroxy-LSD"; 9,10-Didehydro-N,N-diethyl-6-methyl-12-hydroxyergoline-8β-carboxamide
- Drug class: Serotonin receptor modulator
- ATC code: None

Identifiers
- IUPAC name: (6aR,9R)-N,N-diethyl-1-hydroxy-7-methyl-6,6a,8,9-tetrahydro-4H-indolo[4,3-fg]quinoline-9-carboxamide
- CAS Number: 60573-89-9
- PubChem CID: 3042820
- ChemSpider: 2305940
- CompTox Dashboard (EPA): DTXSID00209374

Chemical and physical data
- Formula: C_{20}H_{25}N_{3}O_{2}
- Molar mass: 339.439 g·mol^{−1}
- 3D model (JSmol): Interactive image
- SMILES: CCN(CC)C(=O)[C@H]1CN([C@@H]2CC3=CNC4=C3C(=C(C=C4)O)C2=C1)C
- InChI: InChI=1S/C20H25N3O2/c1-4-23(5-2)20(25)13-8-14-16(22(3)11-13)9-12-10-21-15-6-7-17(24)19(14)18(12)15/h6-8,10,13,16,21,24H,4-5,9,11H2,1-3H3/t13-,16-/m1/s1; Key:SJBIVHSZSSHVGK-CZUORRHYSA-N

12-Hydroxy-LSD, also known as 12-hydroxylysergic acid diethylamide, is a drug of the ergoline and lysergamide families and a derivative of lysergic acid diethylamide (LSD). In terms of chemical structure, 12-hydroxy-LSD is to LSD as bufotenin (5-HO-DMT) is to dimethyltryptamine (DMT), with 12-hydroxy-LSD notably containing bufotenin within its conformationally constrained structure. 12-Hydroxy-LSD produces psychedelic-like effects in animals, whereas reports on its activities in humans are very limited and have been conflicting.

== Pharmacology ==
12-Hydroxy-LSD is known to be pharmacologically active in animal studies. The drug's effects in rabbits include antiserotonergic activity (25% of that of LSD) and hyperthermia (dose ratio relative to LD_{50} of 1:44 for 12-hydroxy-LSD and 1:725 for LSD). In addition, like LSD, it is highly potent in terms of lethality, with a median lethal dose (LD_{50}) of 0.3 mg/kg i.v. in rabbits (relative to 0.1 mg/kg for LSD). 12-Hydroxy-LSD also produces LSD-like electroencephalogram (EEG) changes in rabbits.

According to Robert C. Pfaff and David E. Nichols and colleagues, 12-hydroxy-LSD substitutes for LSD in rodent drug discrimination tests. Hence, it appears to show psychedelic-like effects in animals. However, 12-hydroxy-LSD was described as having unremarkable properties in this assay and only having about 20 to 50% of the potency of LSD. Its reduced potency compared to LSD could be due to its increased polarity and associated pharmacokinetic differences. It was reported in the 1960s that 12-hydroxy-LSD does not produce hallucinogenic effects in humans. On the other hand, however, Michael Valentine Smith claimed in his 1981 book Psychedelic Chemistry that 12-hydroxy-LSD has "about the same activity as LSD".

Presumably 12-hydroxy-LSD acts as an agonist of serotonin and dopamine receptors, as with LSD and other related lysergamides, but its pharmacology has not been studied with modern techniques.

== Chemistry ==
=== Synthesis ===
The chemical synthesis of 12-hydroxy-LSD is described as being very difficult.

=== Analogues ===
An analogue of 12-hydroxy-LSD is 12-methoxy-LSD, which would be structurally akin to 5-MeO-DMT. As with 12-hydroxy-LSD, it has been reported that 12-methoxy-LSD is inactive as a psychedelic in humans.

== History ==
12-Hydroxy-LSD was first described in the scientific literature by 1962. Subsequently, it was further described in the 1970s and 1980s. David E. Nichols and colleagues reported that 12-hydroxy-LSD produces psychedelic-like effects in animals in 1994. It was initially thought that 12-hydroxy-LSD might be a metabolite of LSD, but this proved not to be the case.

== See also ==
- Substituted lysergamide
- 12-Methoxy-LSD
- 13-Hydroxy-LSD
- 14-Hydroxy-LSD
- 2-Bromo-LSD
- Bufotenin (5-HO-DMT)
